= Churches of Moldavia =

UNESCO World Heritage Site
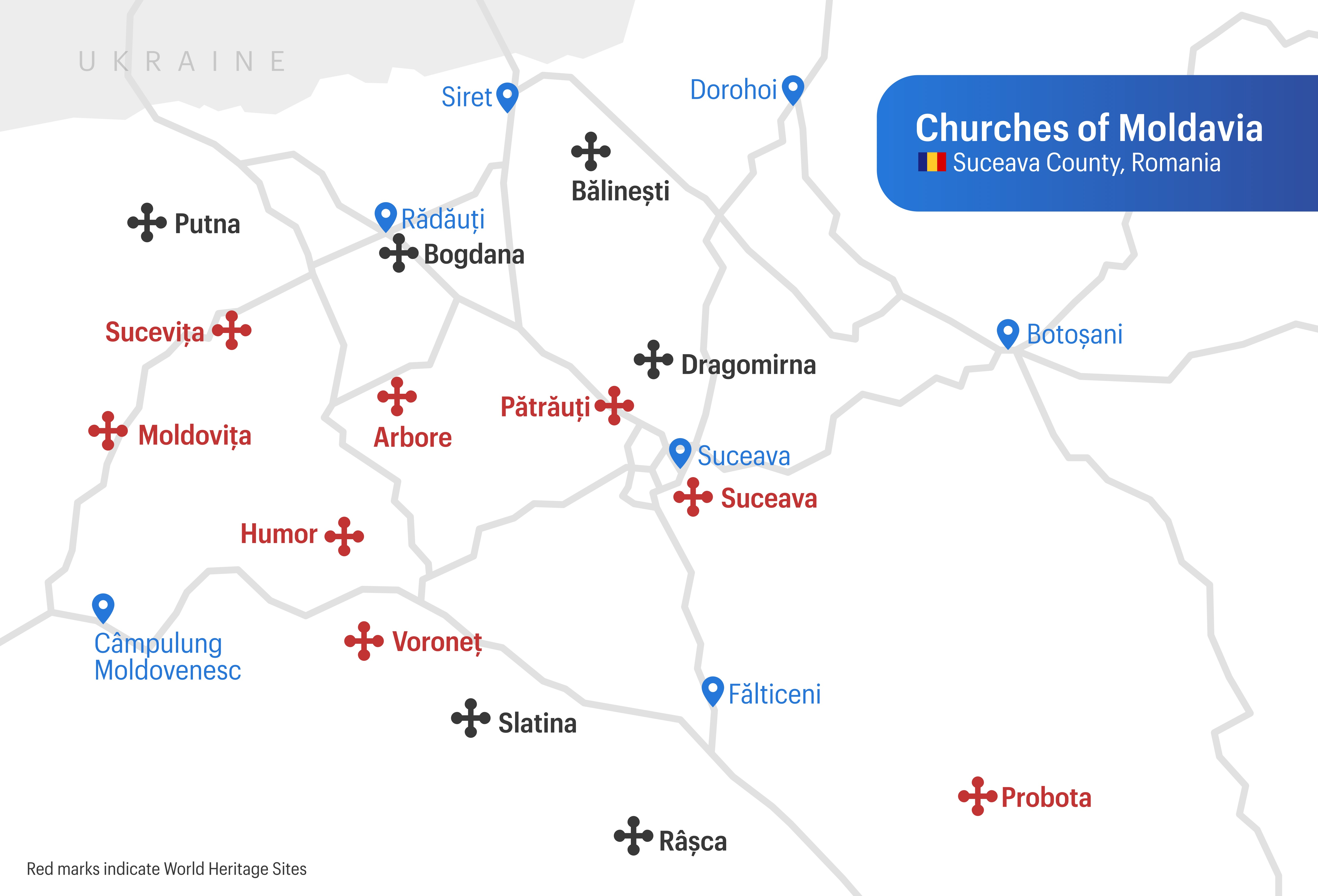
- Map of the most important northern Moldavian monasteries
- Interactive map of Churches of Moldavia
- Location: Suceava County, Moldavia, Romania
- Criteria: Cultural: (i), (iv)
- Reference: 598bis
- Inscription: 1993 (17th Session)
- Extensions: 2010
- Coordinates: 47°46′42″N 25°42′46″E
- UNESCO churches sites: 1 = Arbore, 2 = Humor, 3 = Moldovița, 4 = Pătrăuți, 5 = Probota, 6 = Suceava, 7 = Voroneț, 8 = Sucevița

The north of the Moldavia region in Romania preserves numerous religious buildings as a testimony of the Moldavian architectural style developed in the Principality of Moldavia starting from the 14th century.

Of these, eight Romanian Orthodox Churches located in Suceava County and built from the late 15th century to the late 16th century are listed by UNESCO as a World Heritage Site, since 1993. Church of the Resurrection within the Sucevița Monastery was added to the site in 2010. The churches have their external walls covered in authentic and unique fresco paintings, representing complete cycles of religious themes.

== World Heritage Site ==
| Image | Name | Location | Built | Founder |
|---|---|---|---|---|
| | Beheading of St. John the Baptist Church | Arbore | 1502 | Luca Arbore |
| | Assumption of the Virgin Church | Mănăstirea Humorului | 1530 | Toader Bubuiog |
| | Annunciation Church | Vatra Moldoviței | 1532 | Petru Rareș |
| | Holy Rood Church | Pătrăuți | 1487 | Ștefan cel Mare |
| | St. Nicholas Church | Probota | 1530 | Petru Rareș |
| | St. George Church | Suceava | 1522 | Bogdan III |
| | St. George Church | Voroneț | 1488 | Ștefan cel Mare |
| | Resurrection Church | Sucevița | 1581 | Gheorghe Movilă |

== Other churches ==
| Name | Location | Built | Founder |
|---|---|---|---|
| Agapia Monastery | Agapia, Neamț County | 1643 | Gavriil Coci |
| Bogdana Monastery | Rădăuți, Suceava County | 1360 | Bogdan I |
| Cetățuia Monastery | Iași, Iași County | 1672 | Gheorghe Duca |
| Dragomirna Monastery | Mitocu Dragomirnei, Suceava County | 1609 | Anastasie Crimca |
| Galata Monastery | Iași, Iași County | 1584 | Petru Șchiopul |
| Golia Monastery | Iași, Iași County | 1660 | Ioan Golia |
| Neamț Monastery | Vânători-Neamț, Neamț County | 1497 | Ștefan cel Mare |
| Putna Monastery | Putna, Suceava County | 1466 | Ștefan cel Mare |
| Trei Ierarhi Monastery | Iași, Iași County | 1639 | Vasile Lupu |
| Văratec Monastery | Văratec, Neamț County | 1785 | Olimpiada |

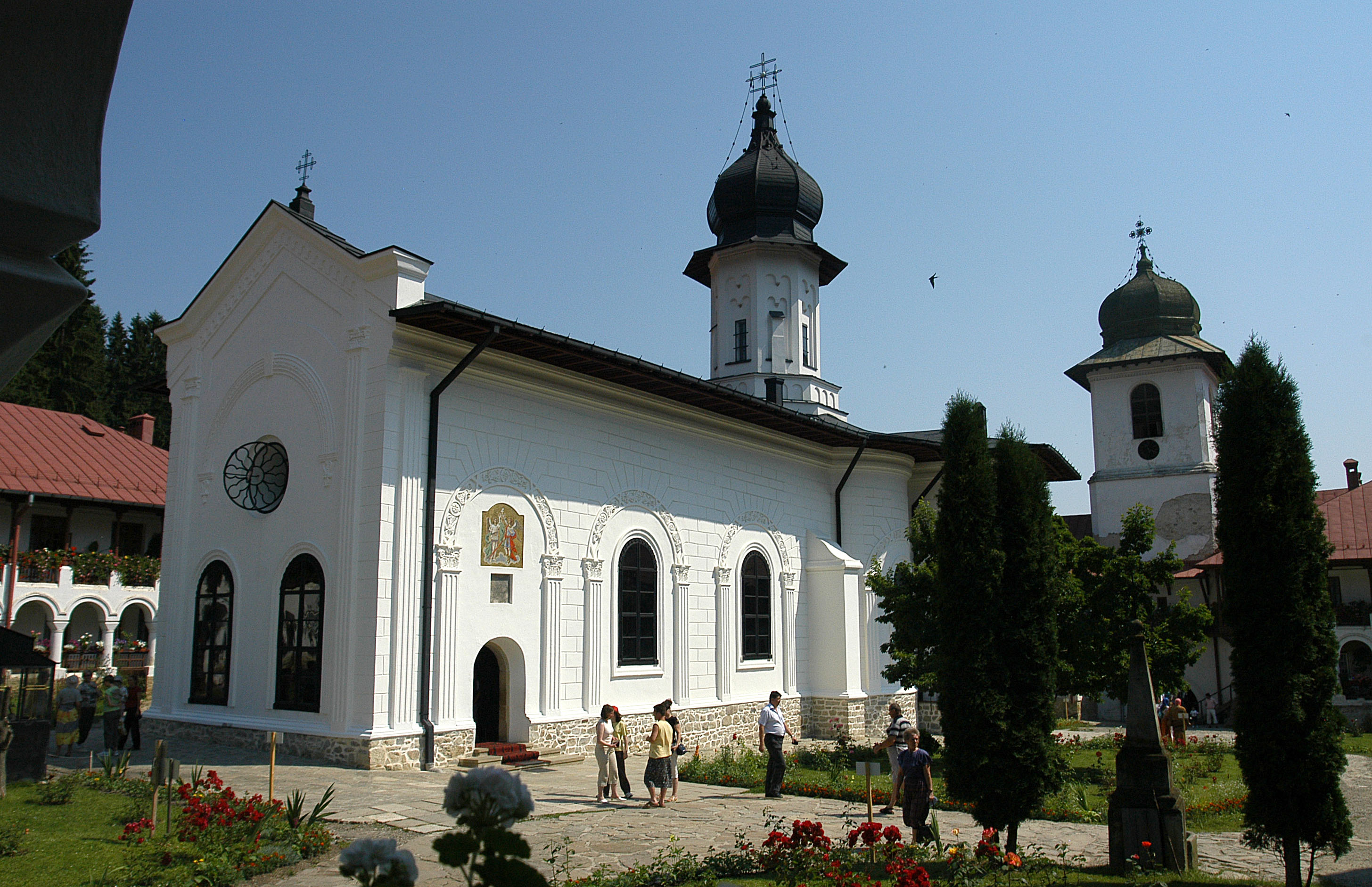
Agapia Monastery

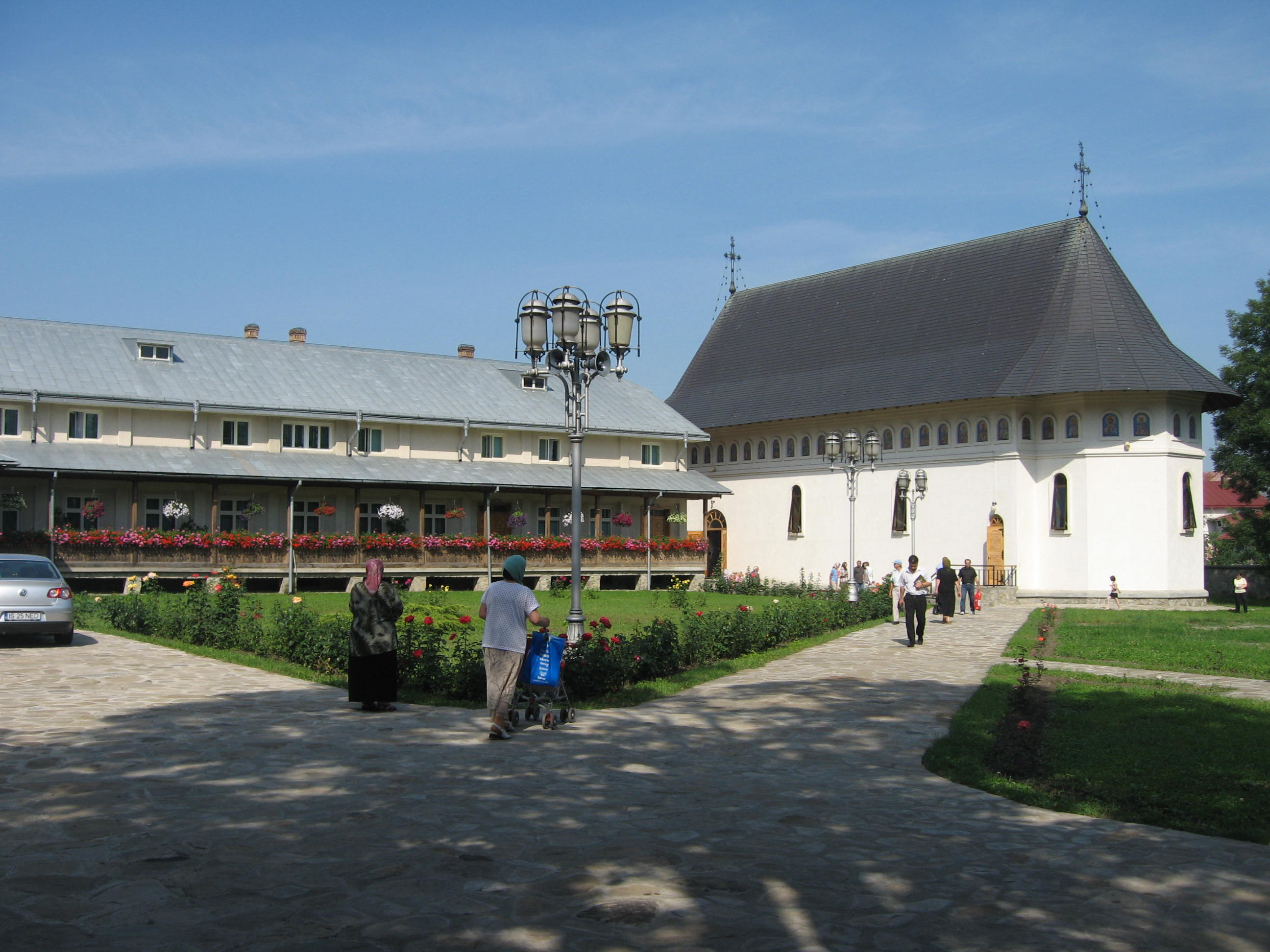
Bogdana Monastery

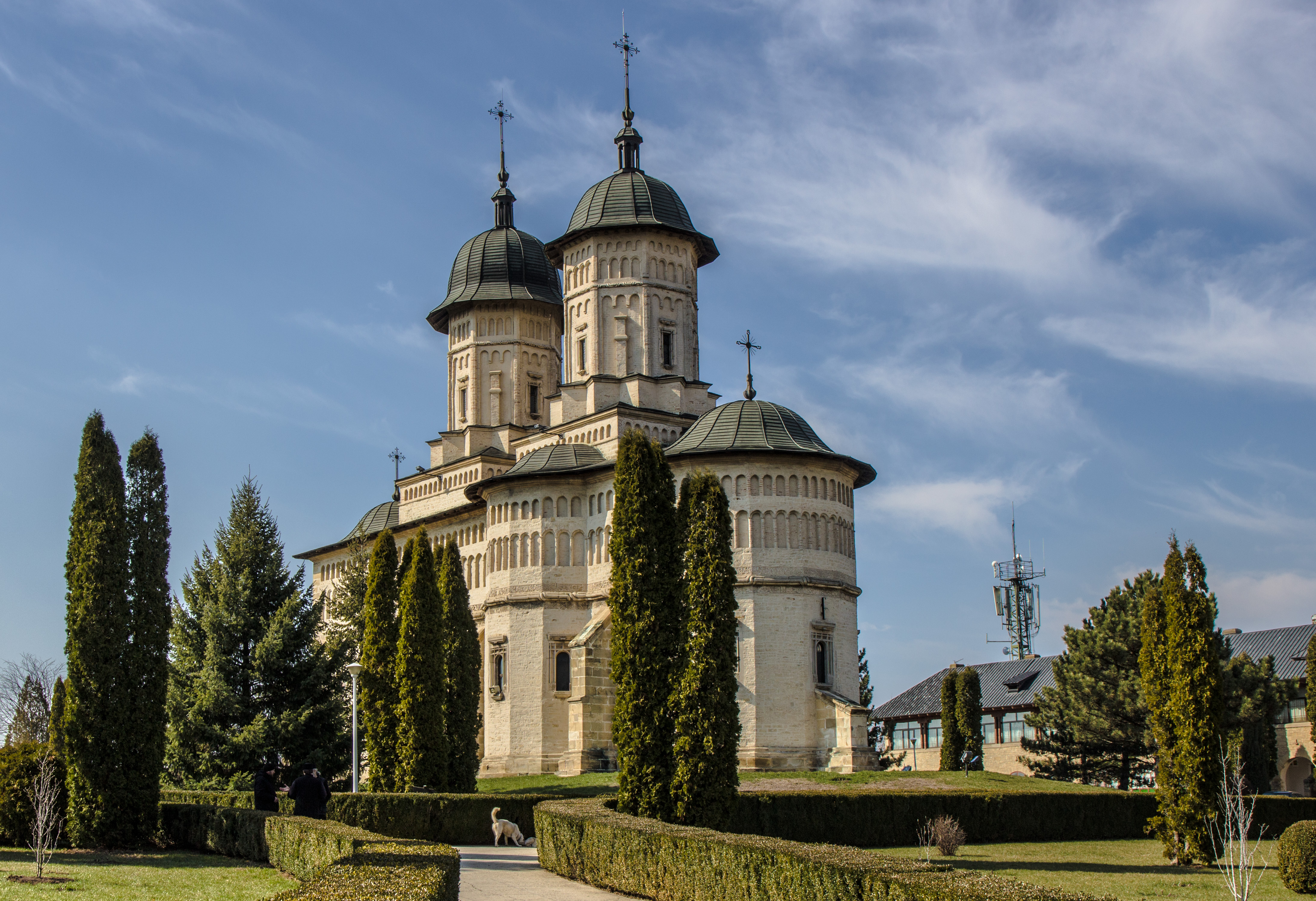
Cetățuia Monastery

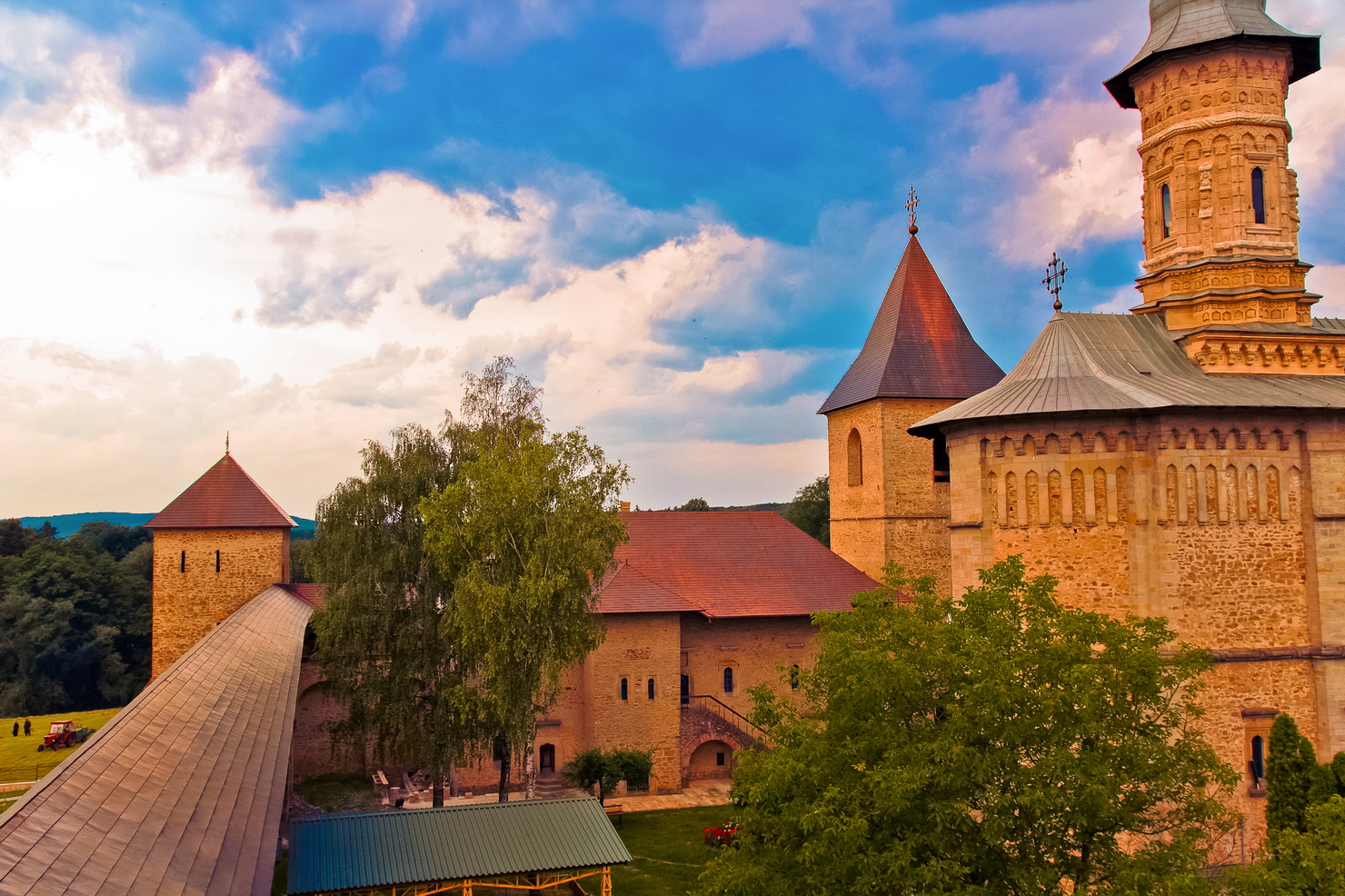
Dragomirna Monastery

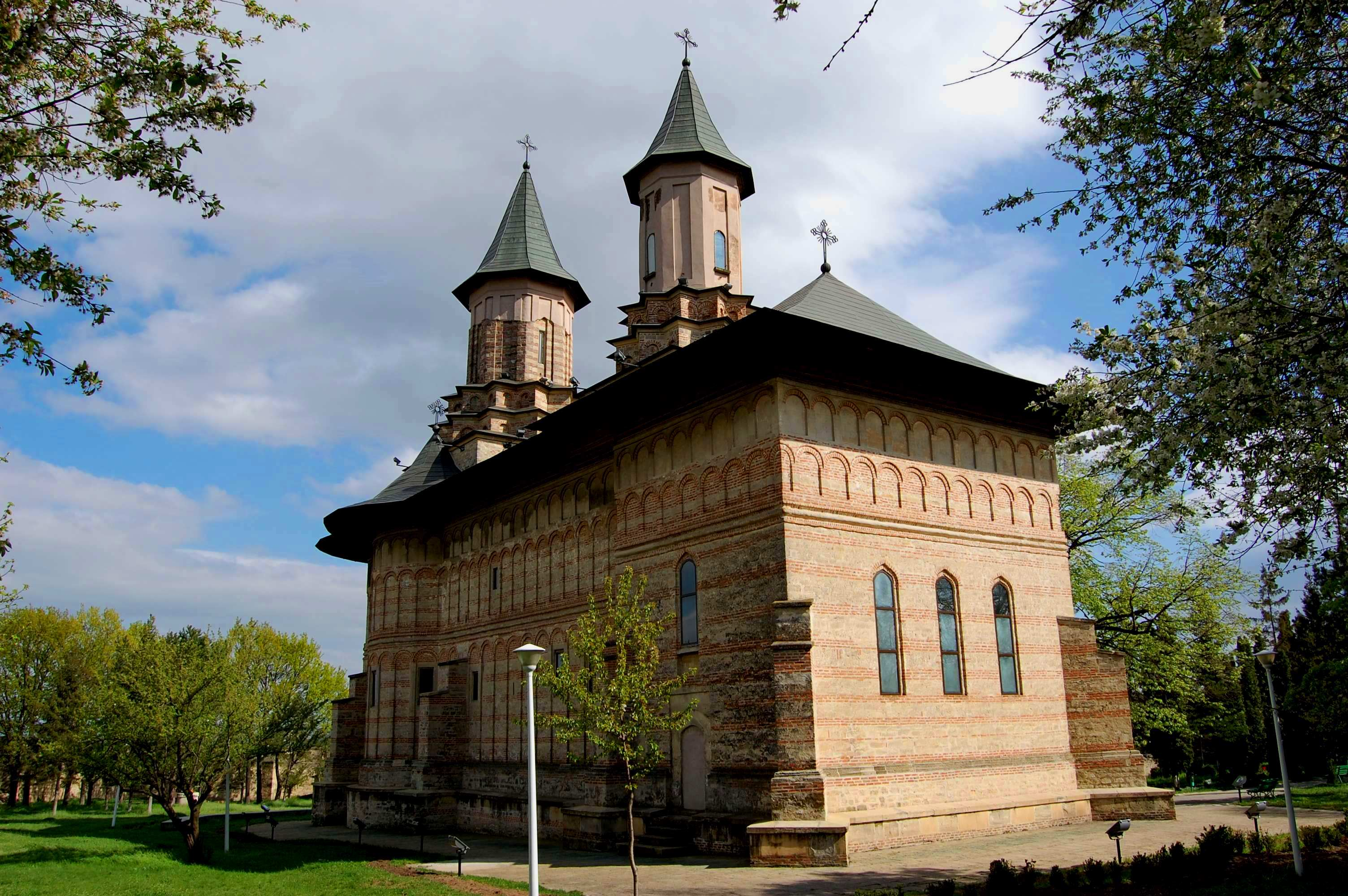
Galata Monastery

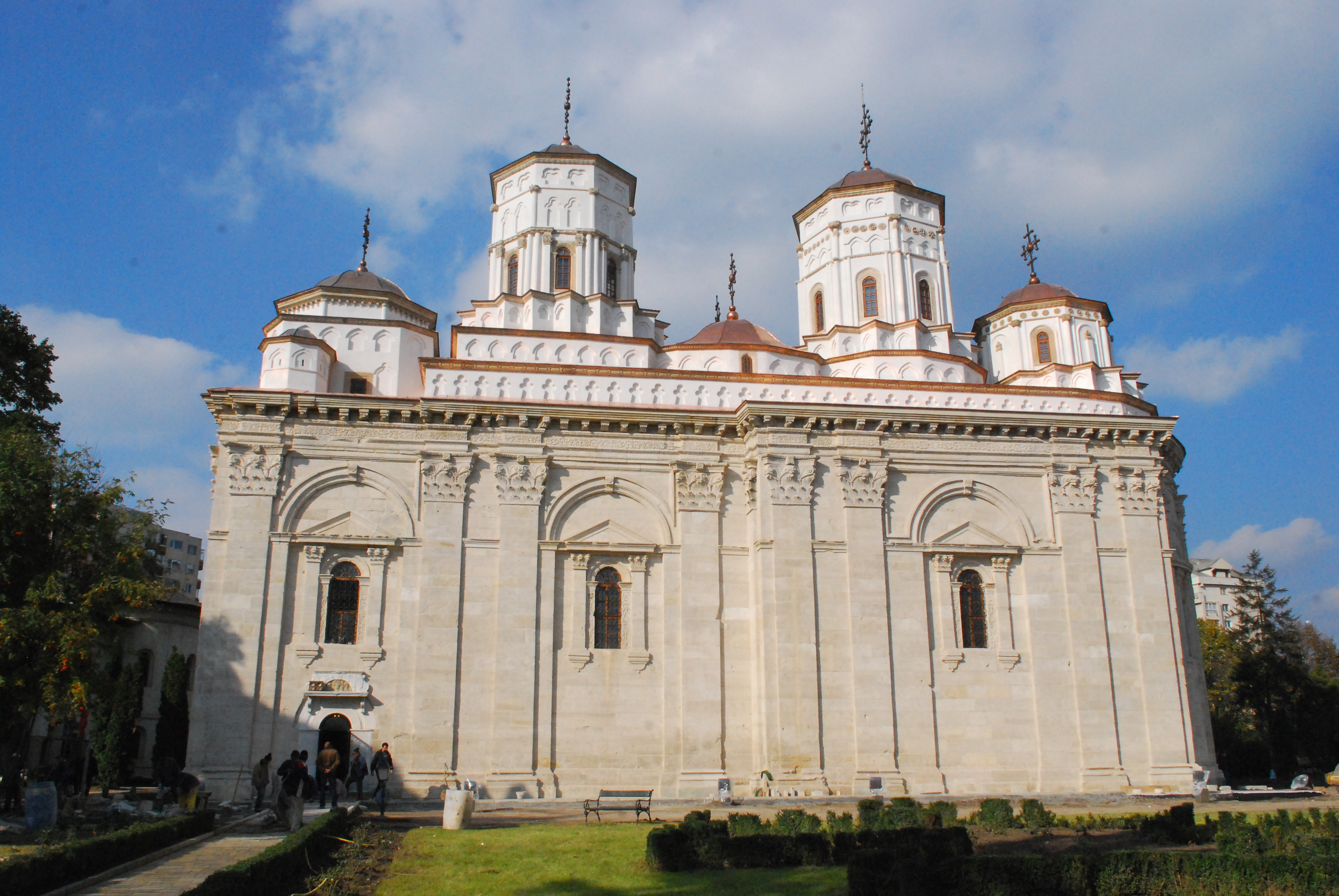
Golia Monastery

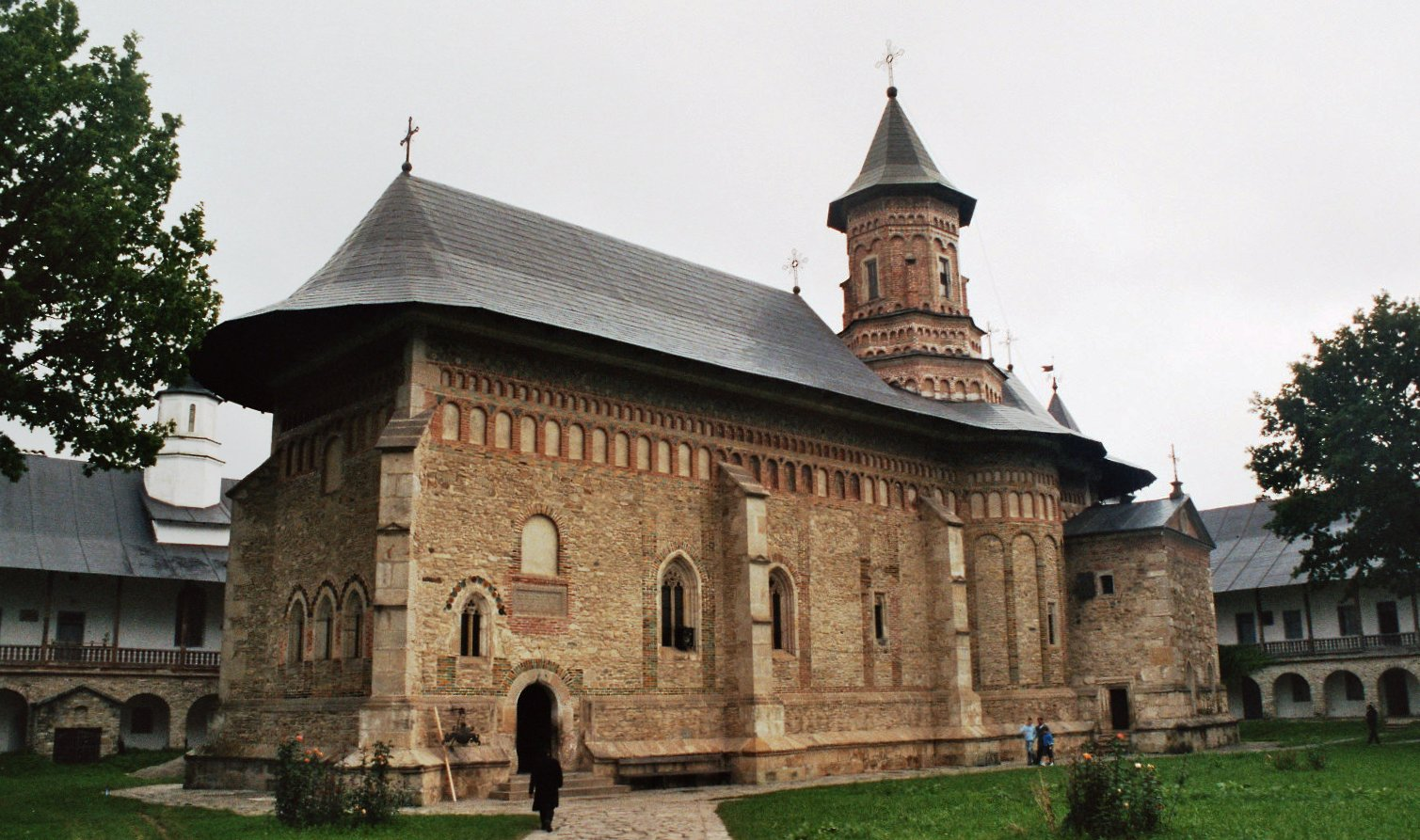
Neamț Monastery

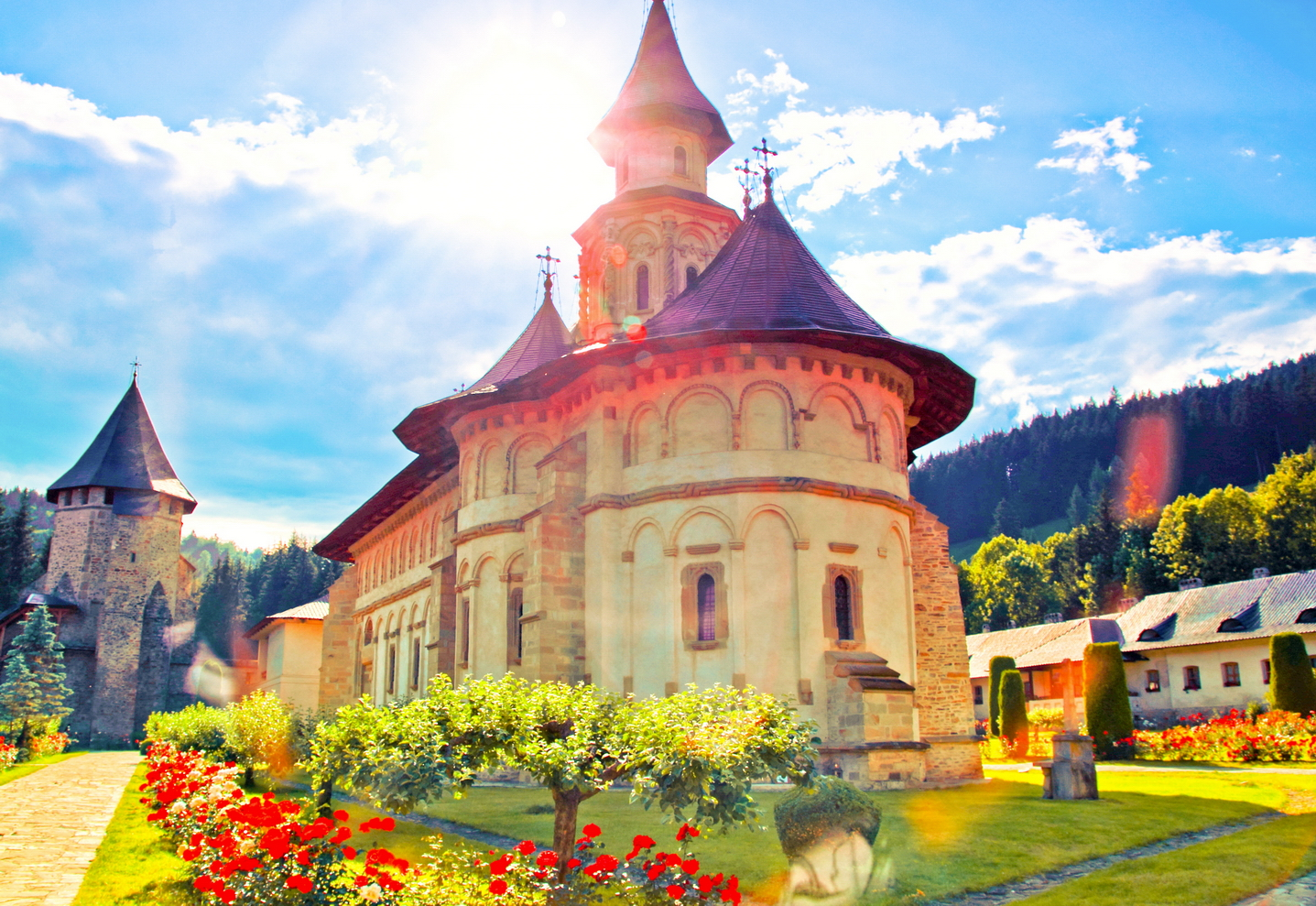
Putna Monastery

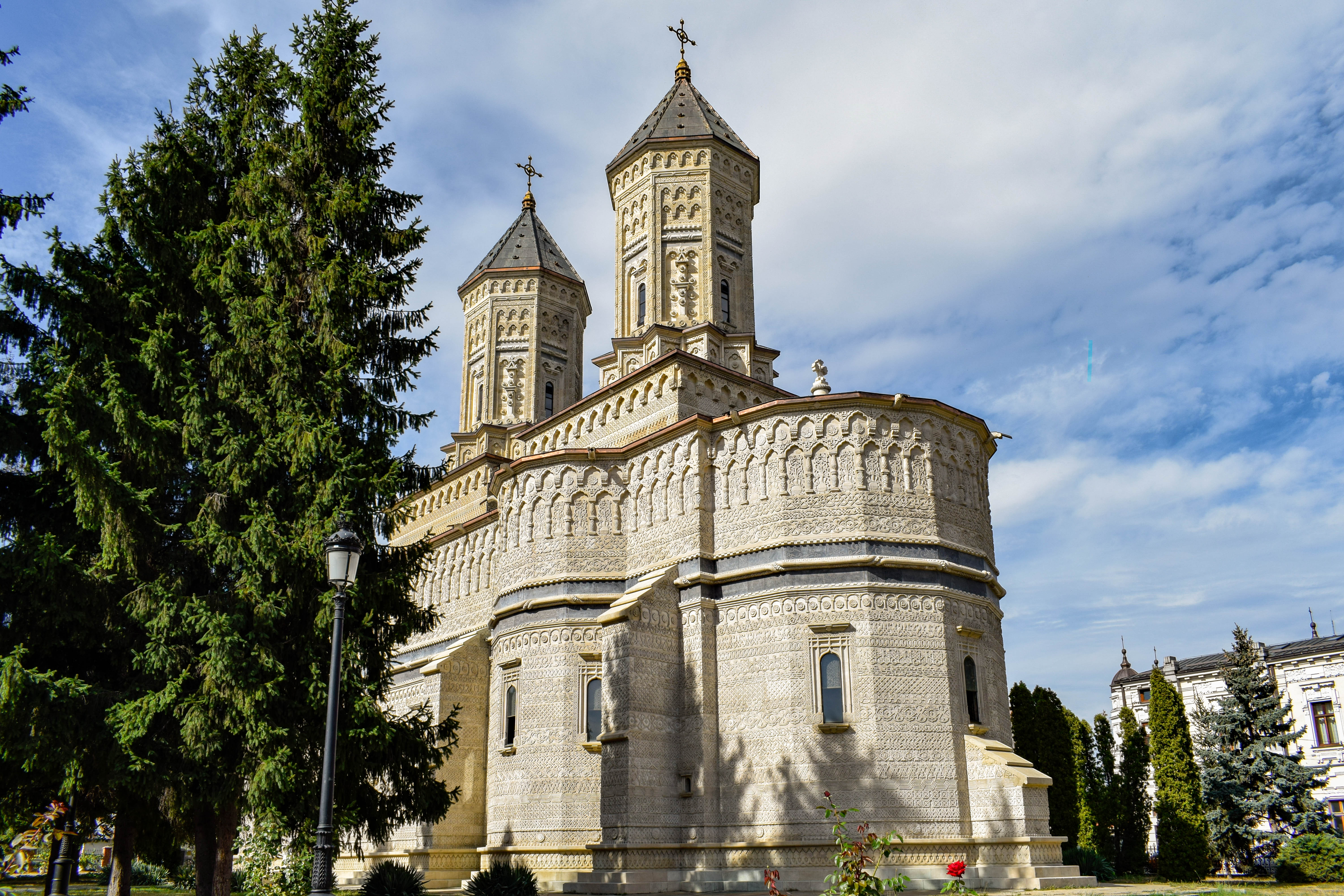
Trei Ierarhi Monastery

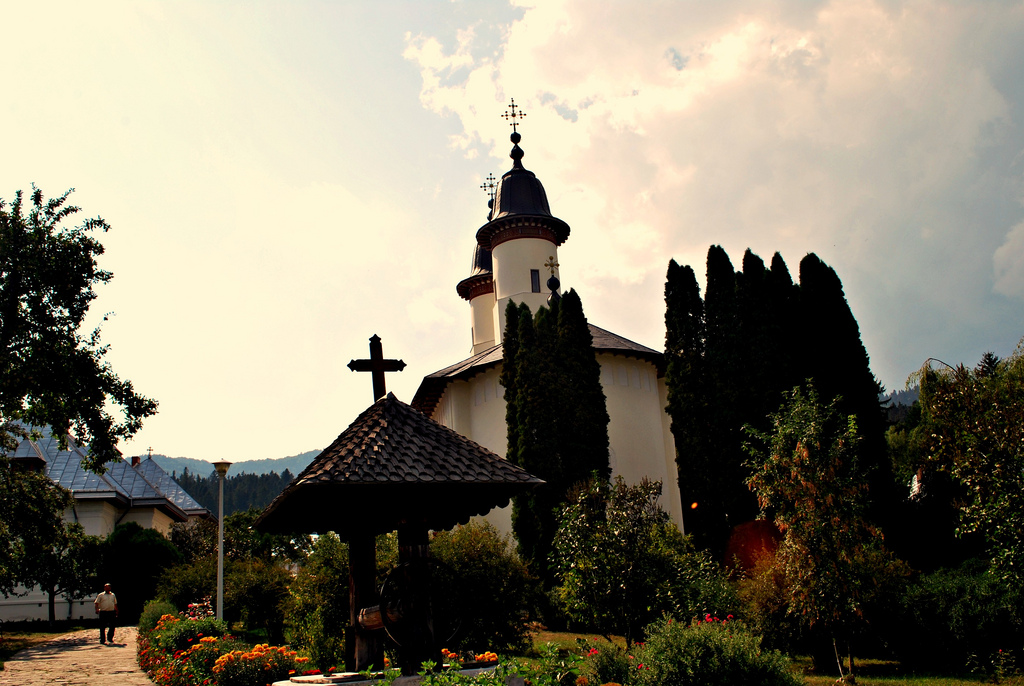
Văratec Monastery

== See also ==
- Byzantium after Byzantium
- Christianity in Romania
- Eastern Orthodox Church
- List of World Heritage Sites in Romania
- Moldavian vault
- Moldavian style
- Seven Wonders of Romania
- Romanian architecture
- Tourism in Romania
