= Moldavian architectural style =

Architecture

Moldavian architectural style is a type of architecture developed in Moldavia during the 14th through 19th centuries.

The style of architecture thrived during Stephen the Great's reign. The Moldavian monasteries which belong to the UNESCO heritage are made in this style.

== Gallery ==
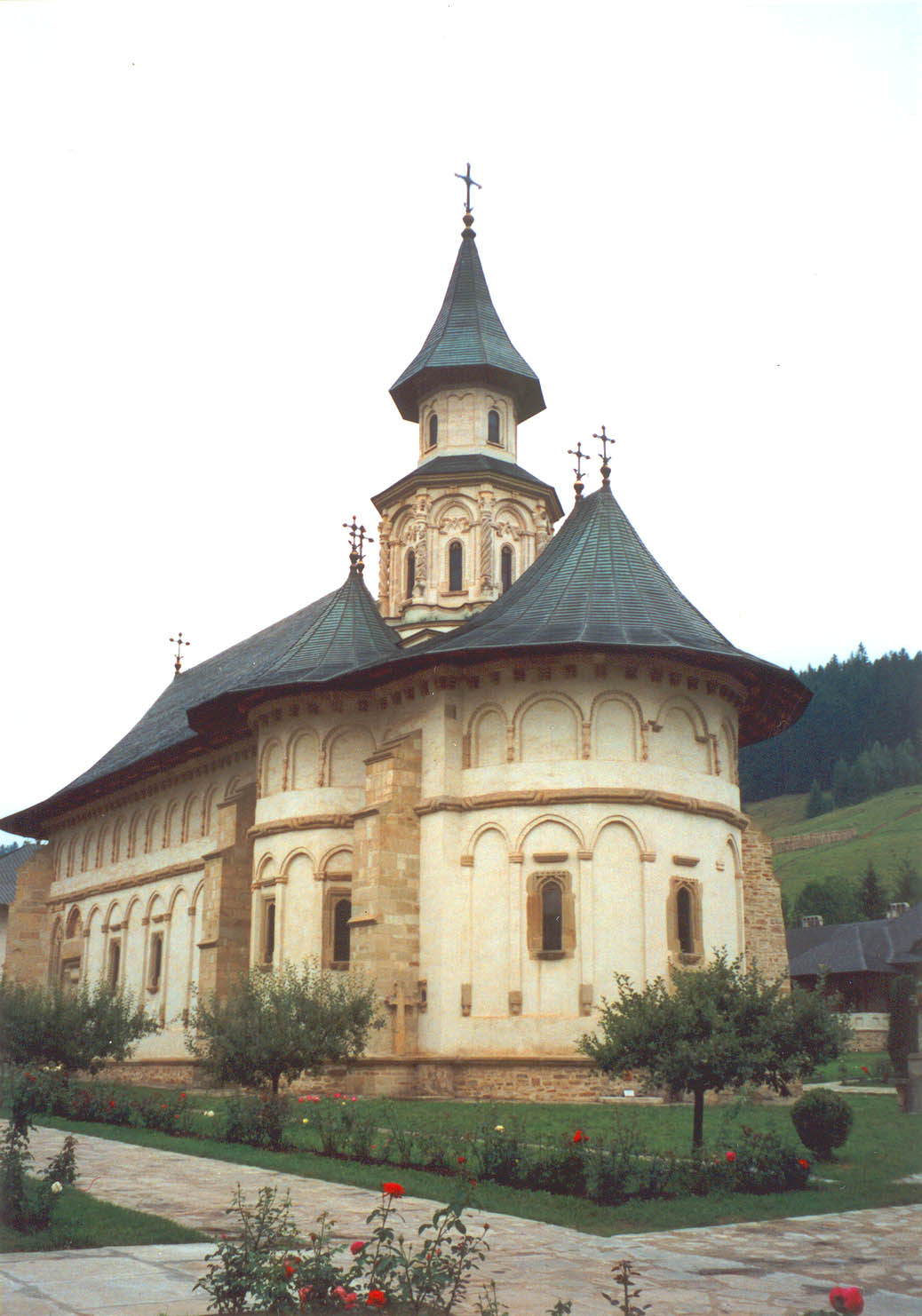
Putna Monastery in Suceava County

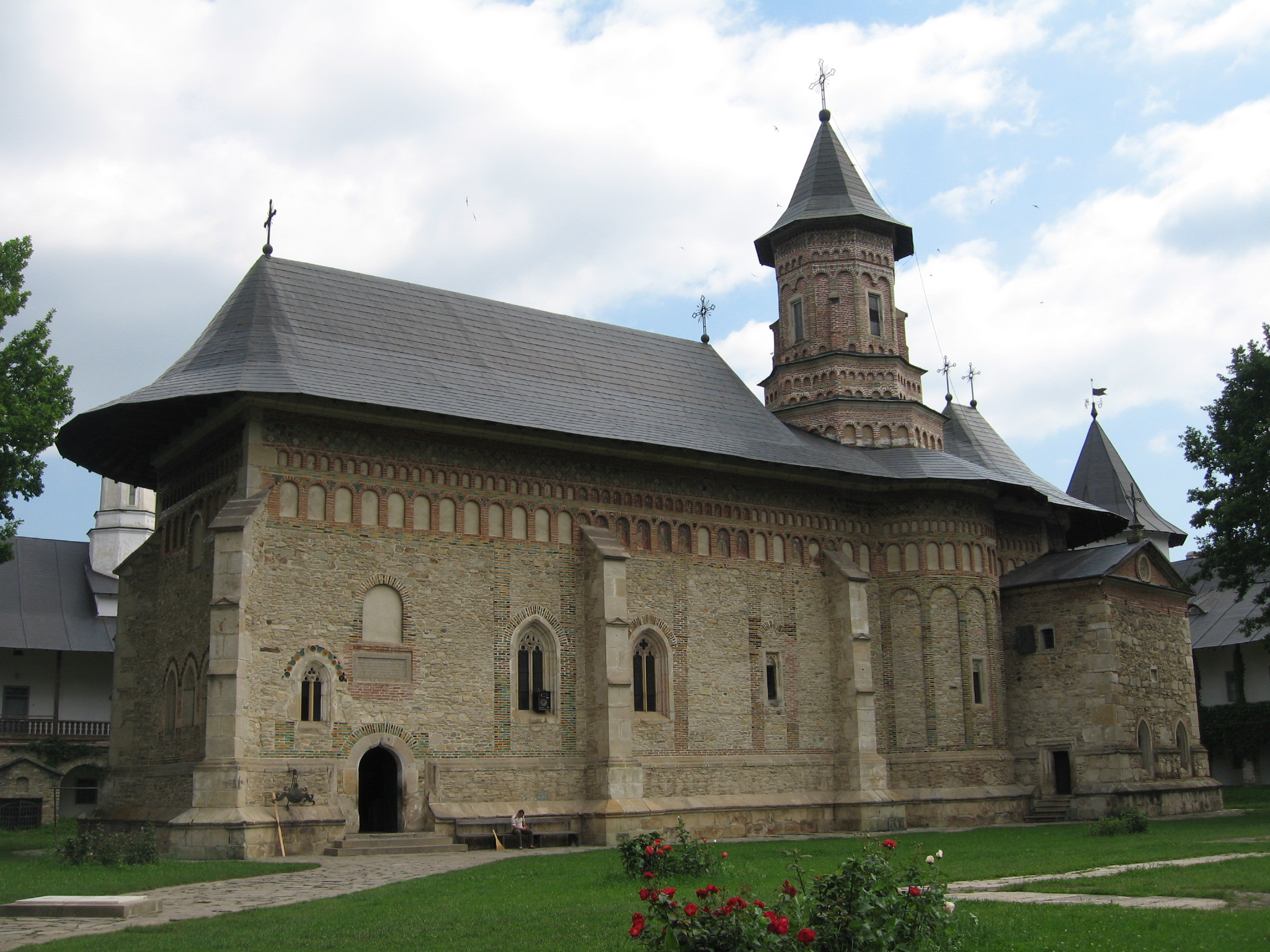
Neamț Monastery in Neamț County

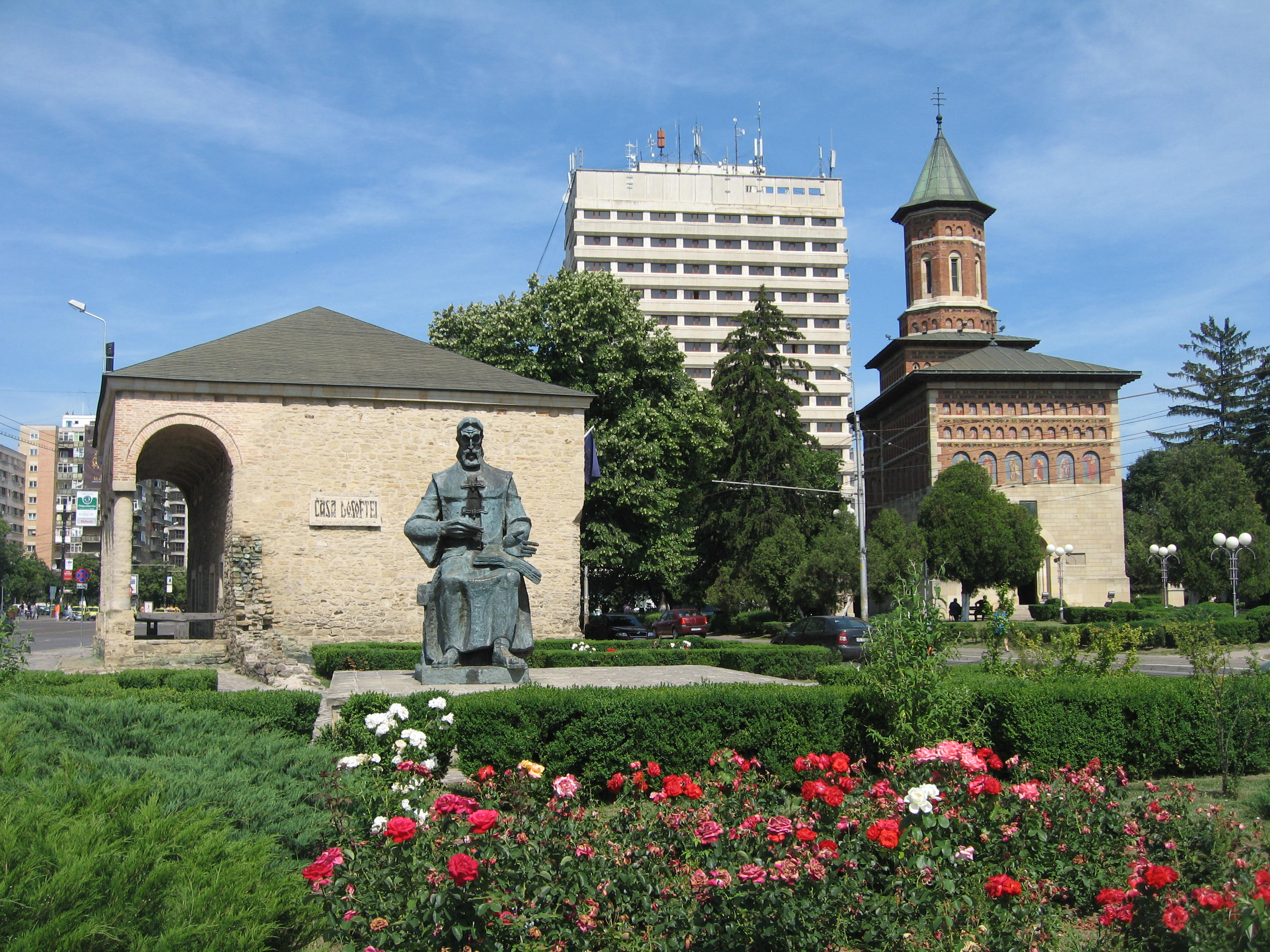
Princely Saint Nicholas Church and Dosoftei House in Iași

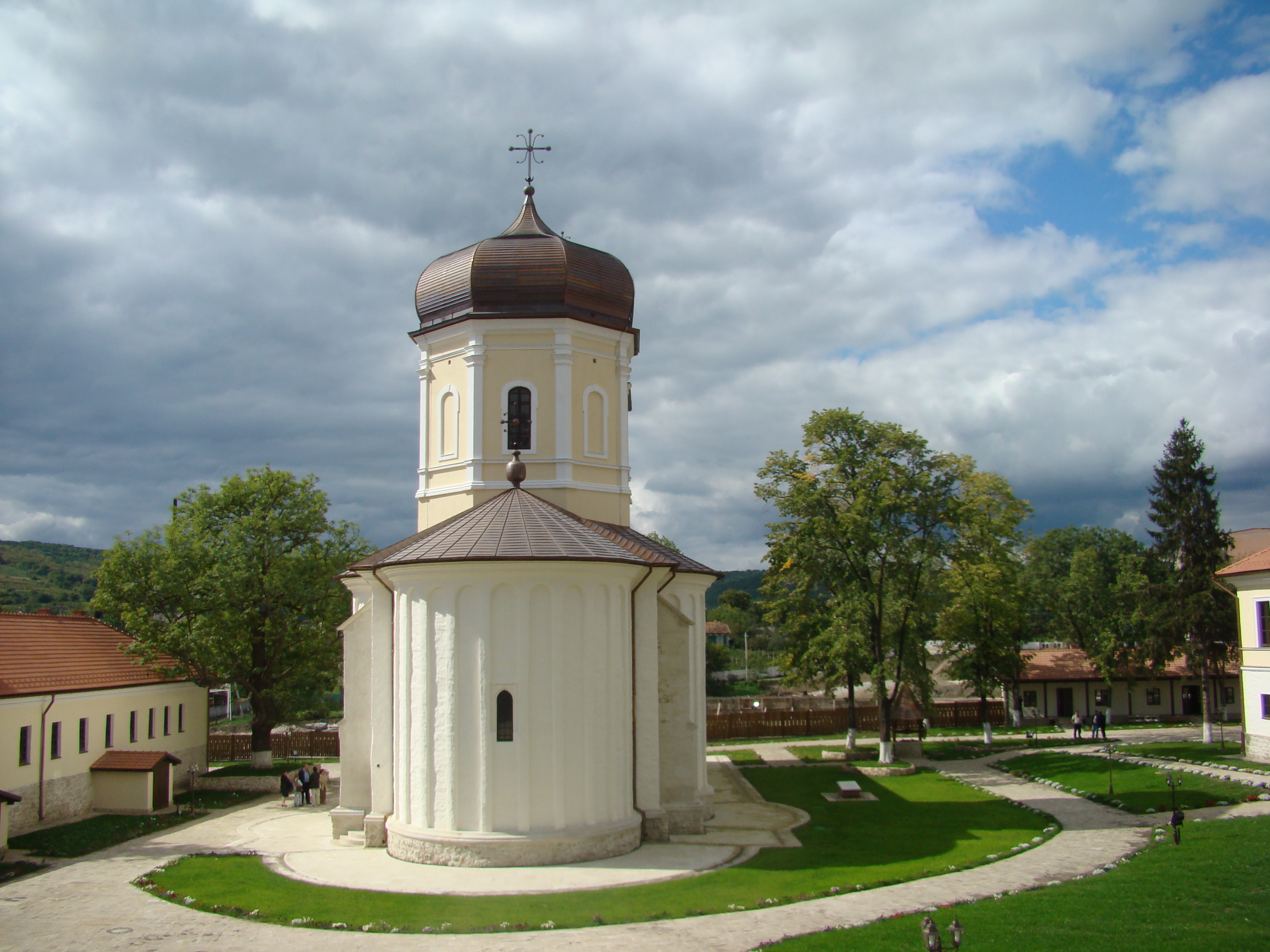
Căpriana monastery in Strășeni District, Moldova

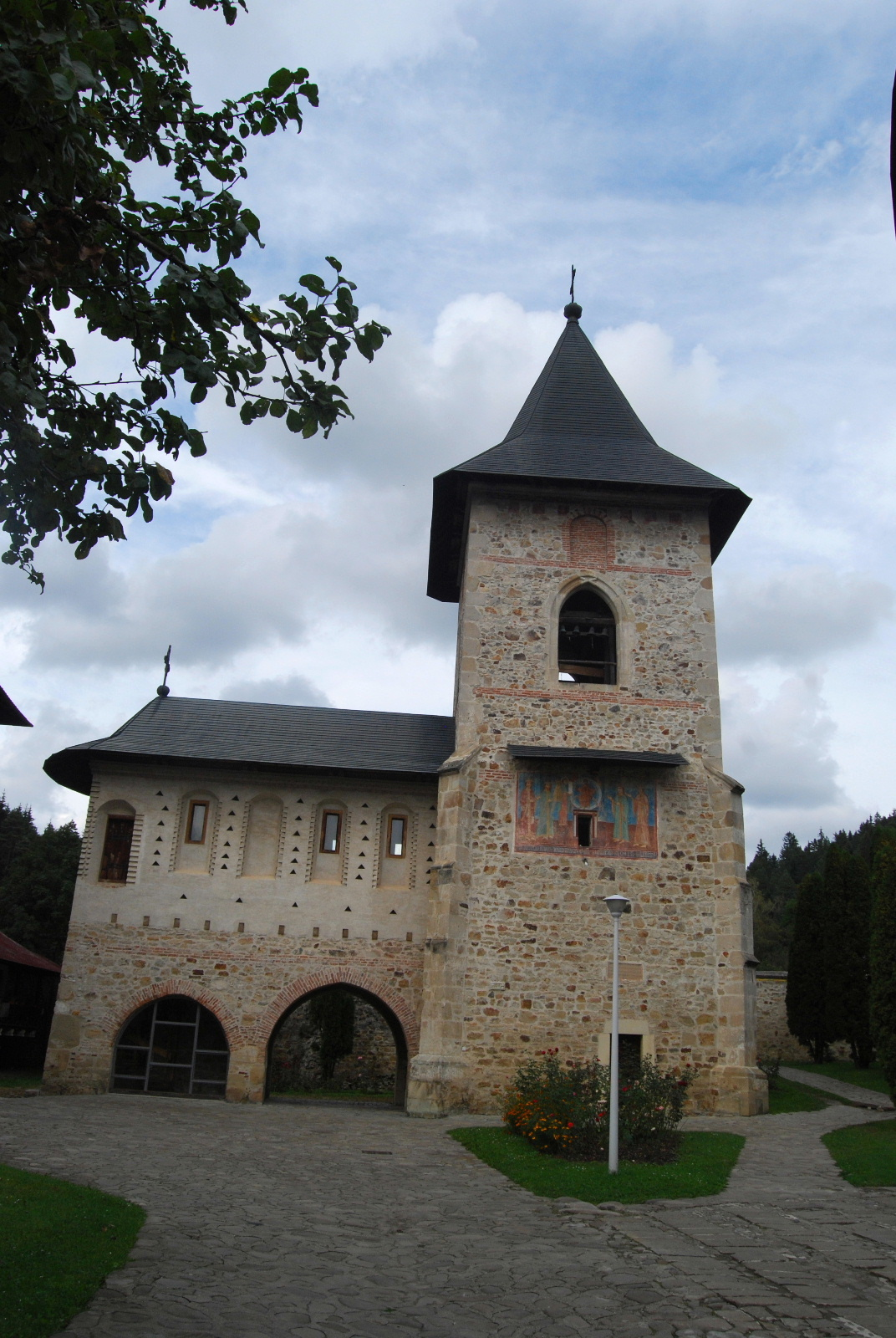
Bistrița Monastery in Neamț County

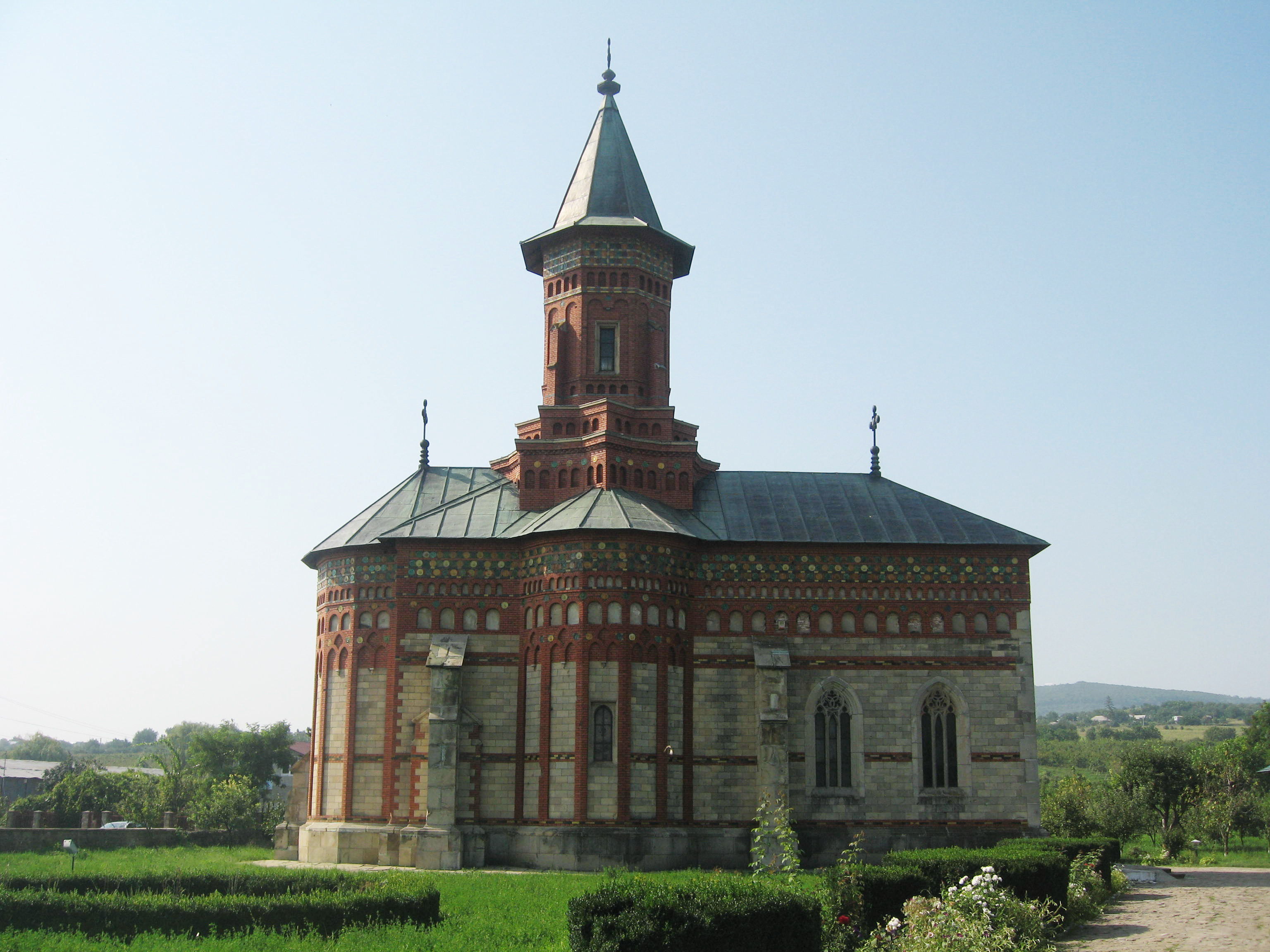
St. George Church in Hârlău

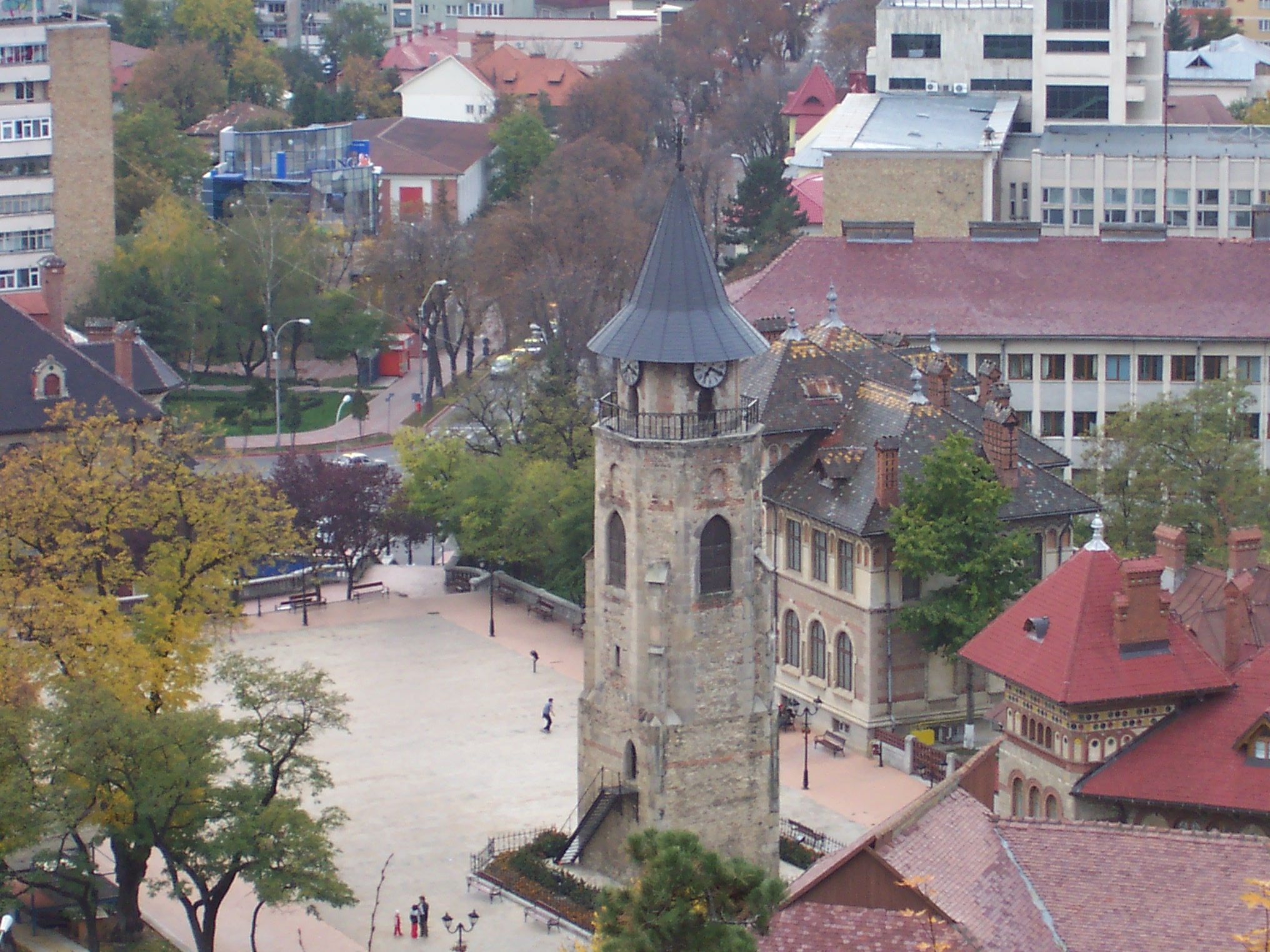
Stephen III of Moldavia's Tower in Piatra Neamț

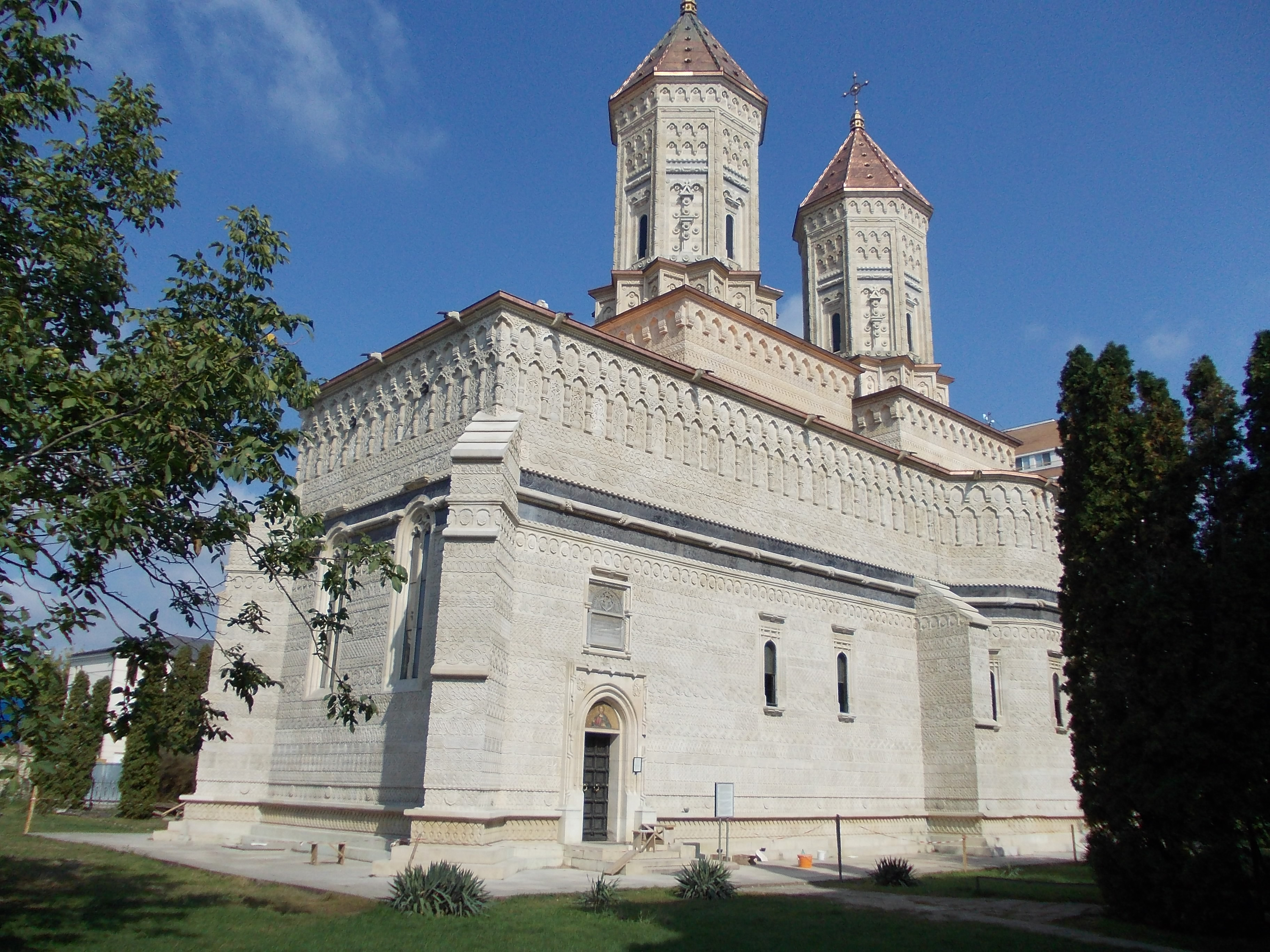
Three Hierarchs Monastery in Iași

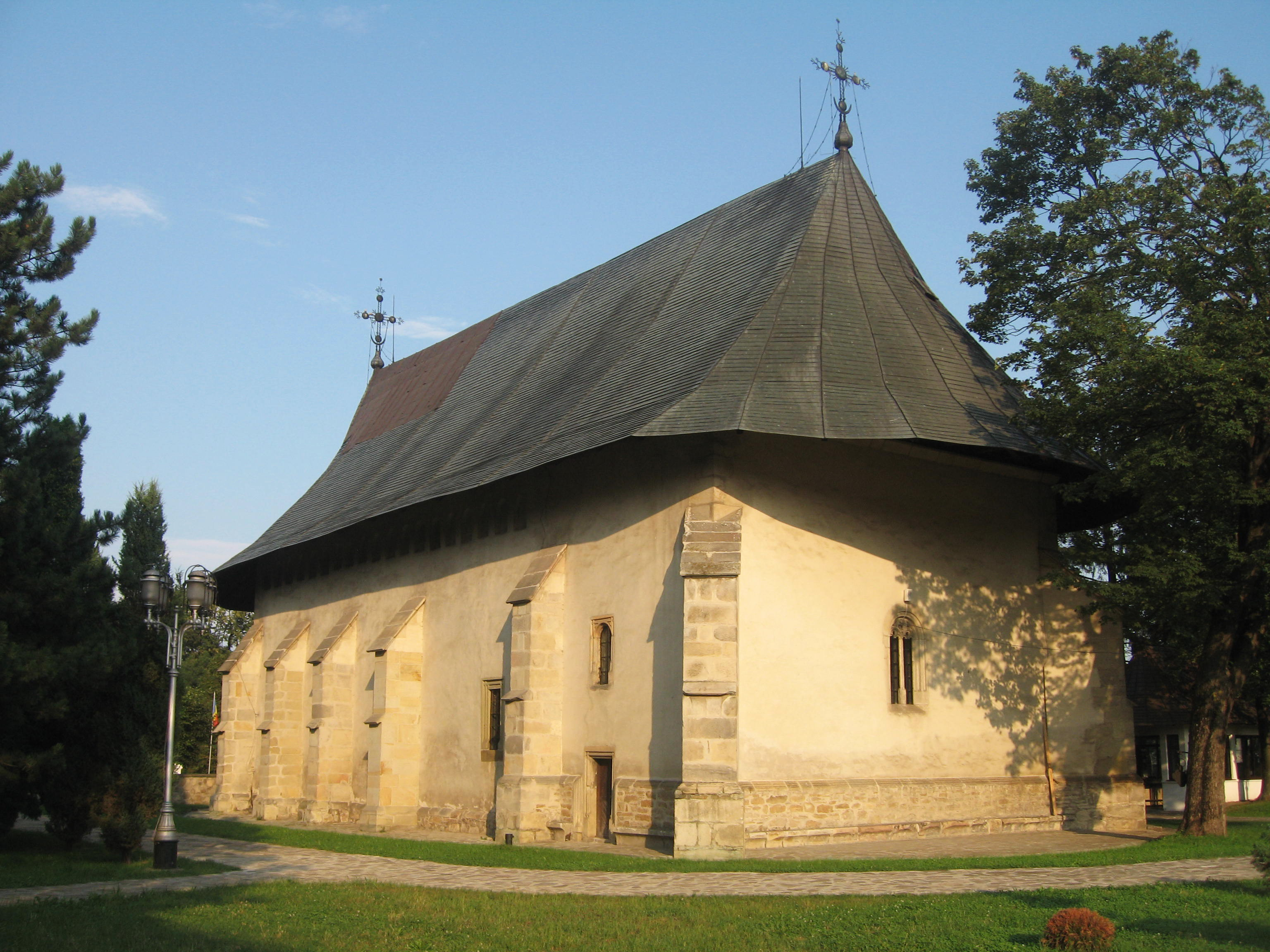
Bogdana Monastery in Rădăuți

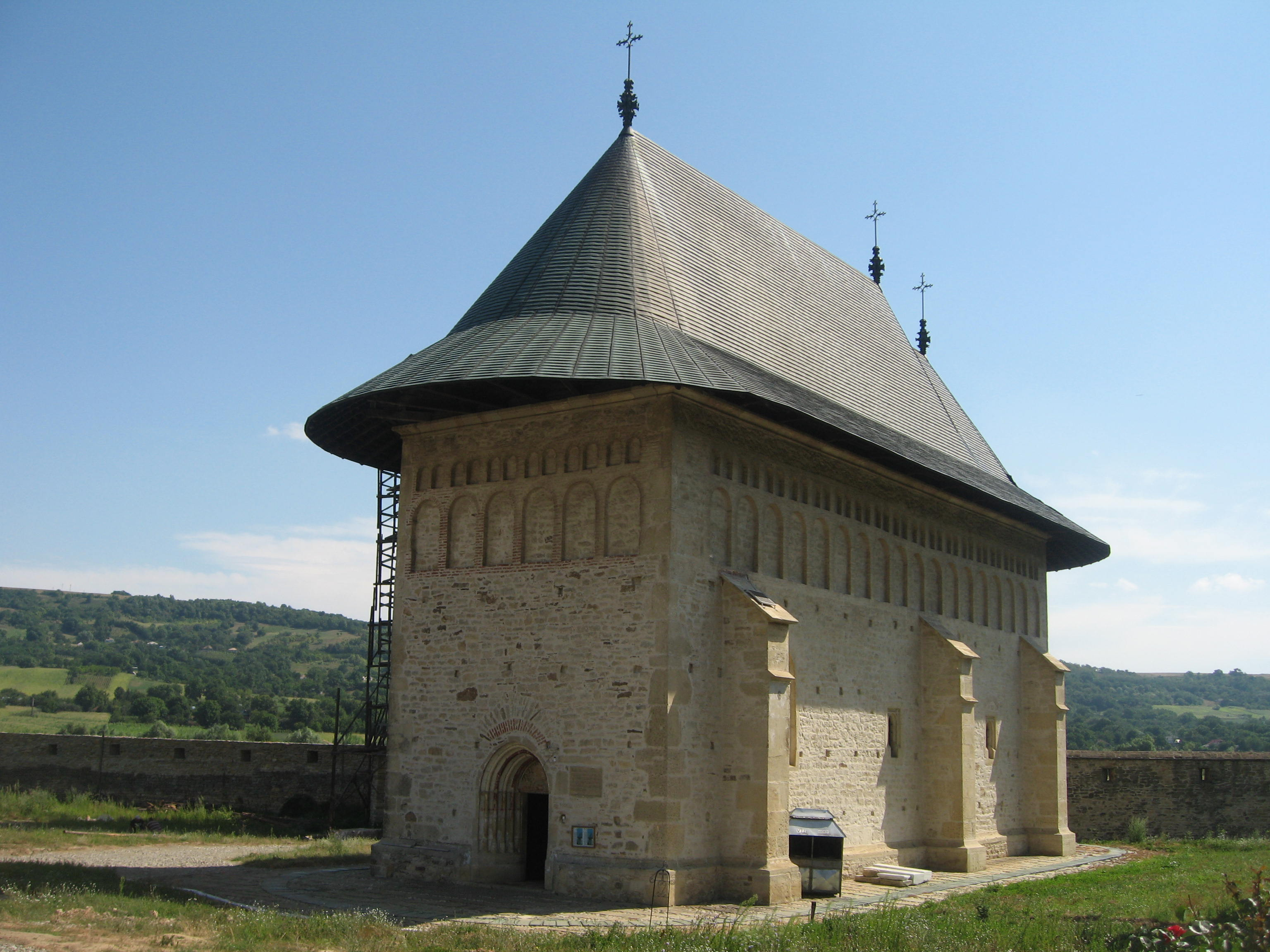
Dobrovăț Monastery in Iași County

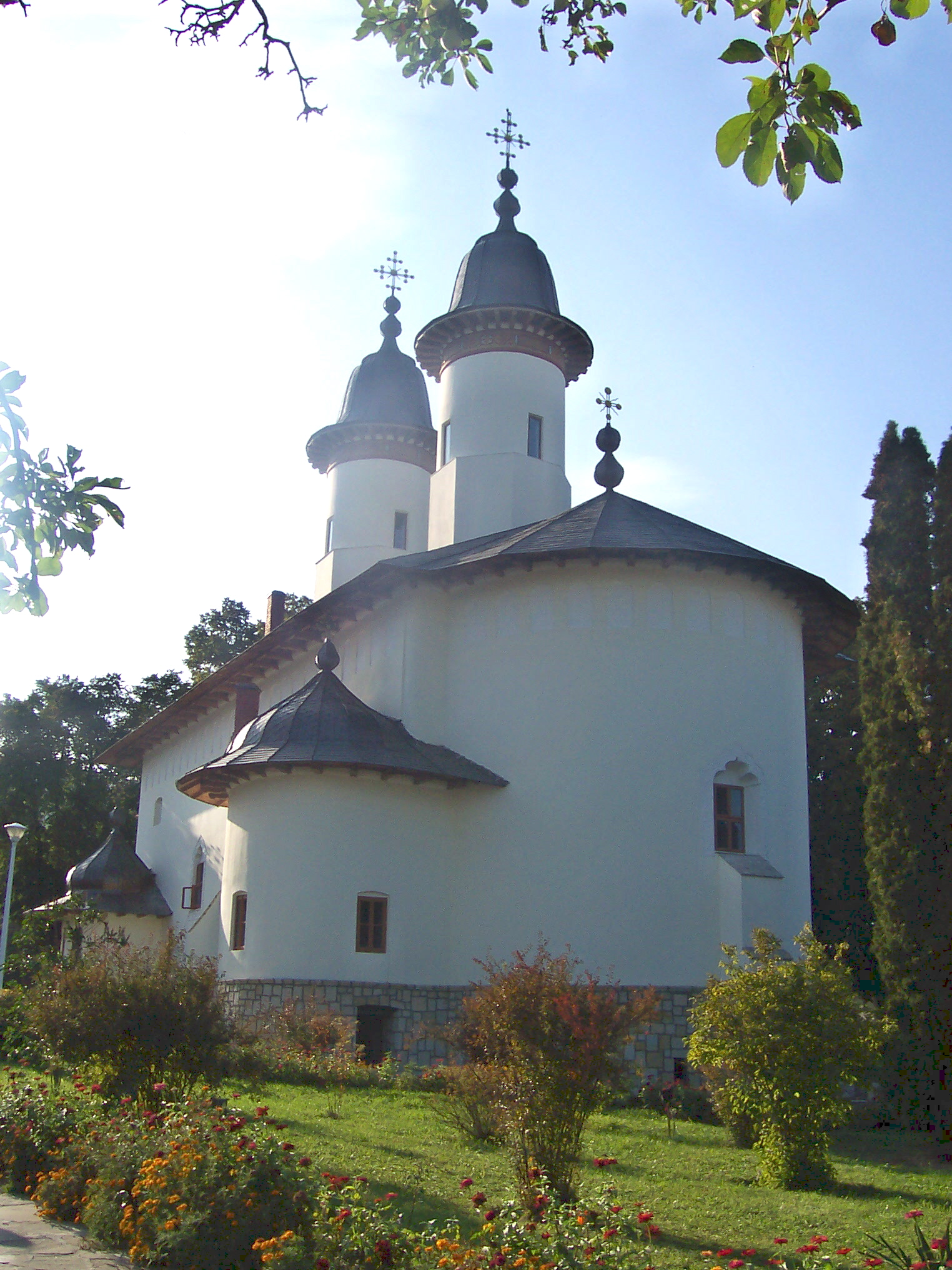
Văratec Monastery in Neamț County

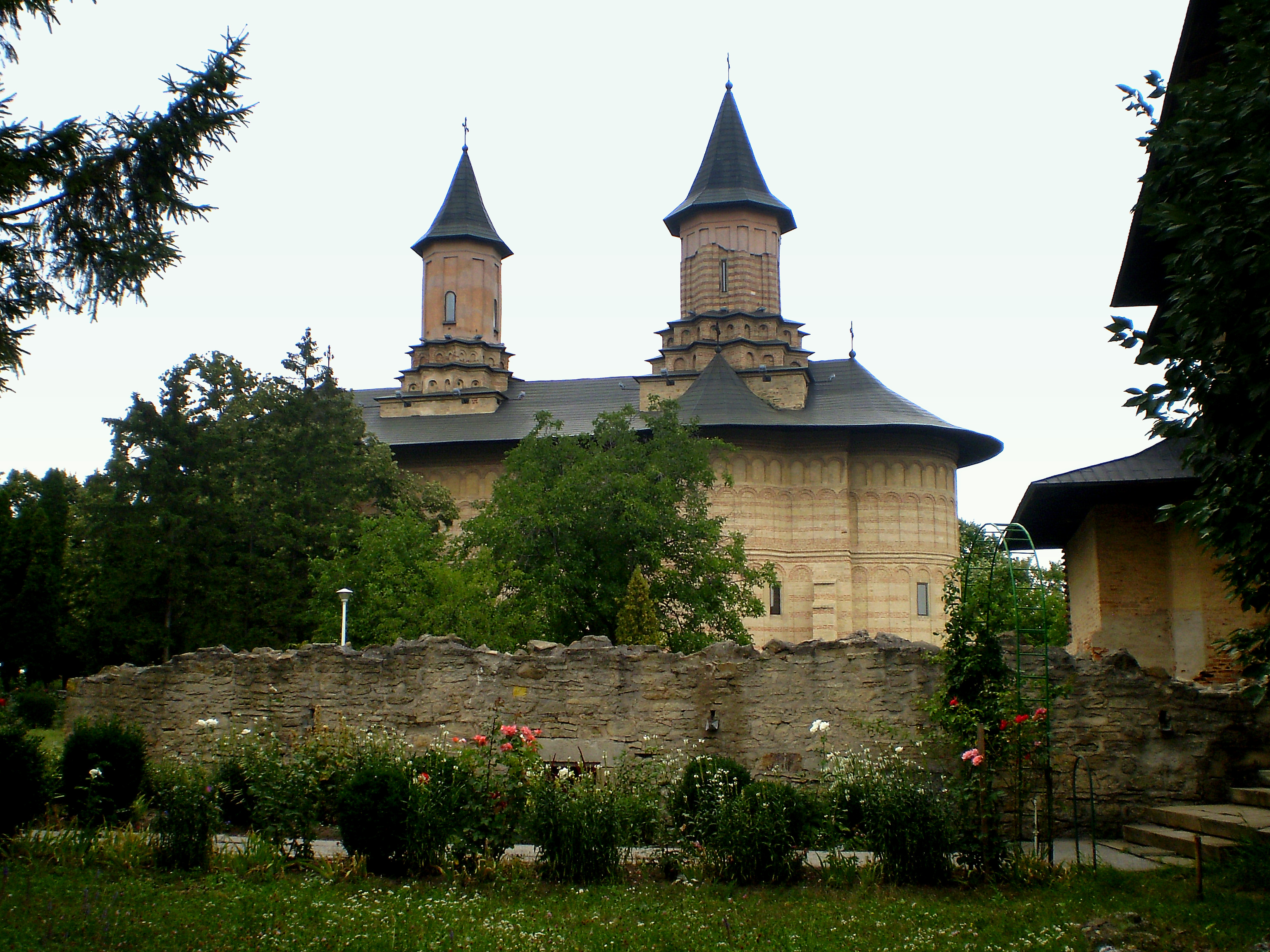
Galata Monastery in Iași

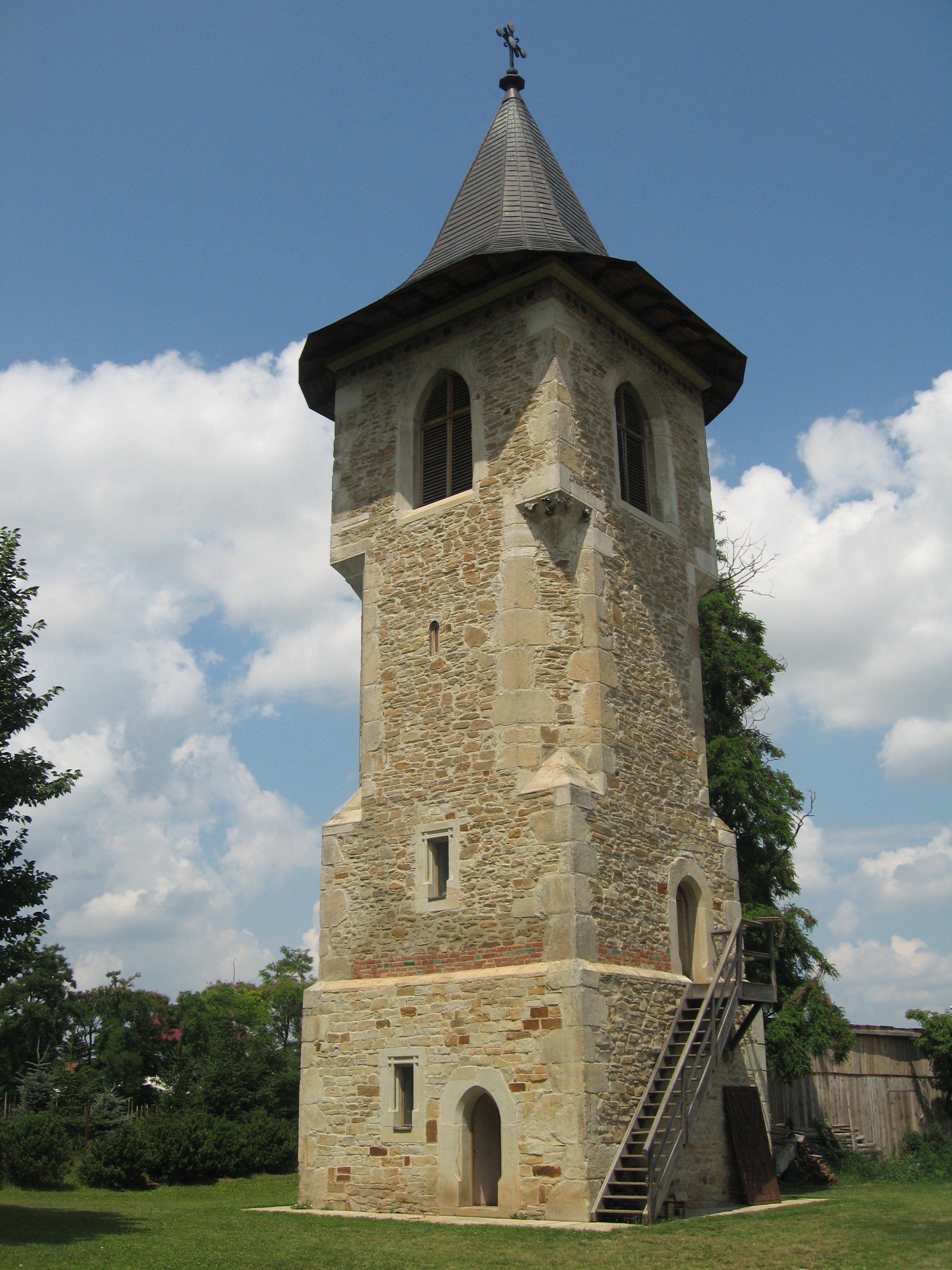
Bell Tower, Popăuți Monastery in Botoșani

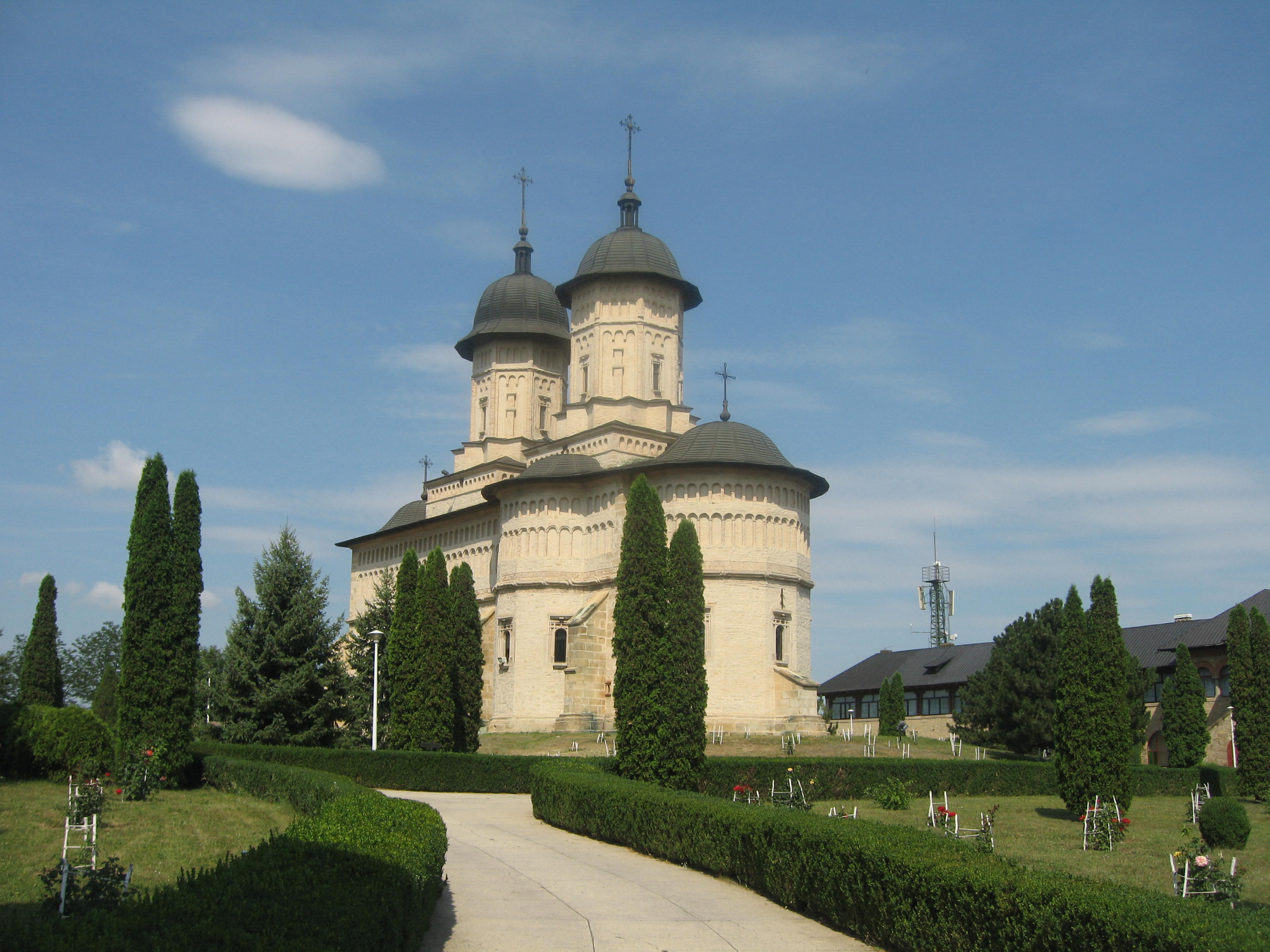
Cetățuia Monastery in Iași

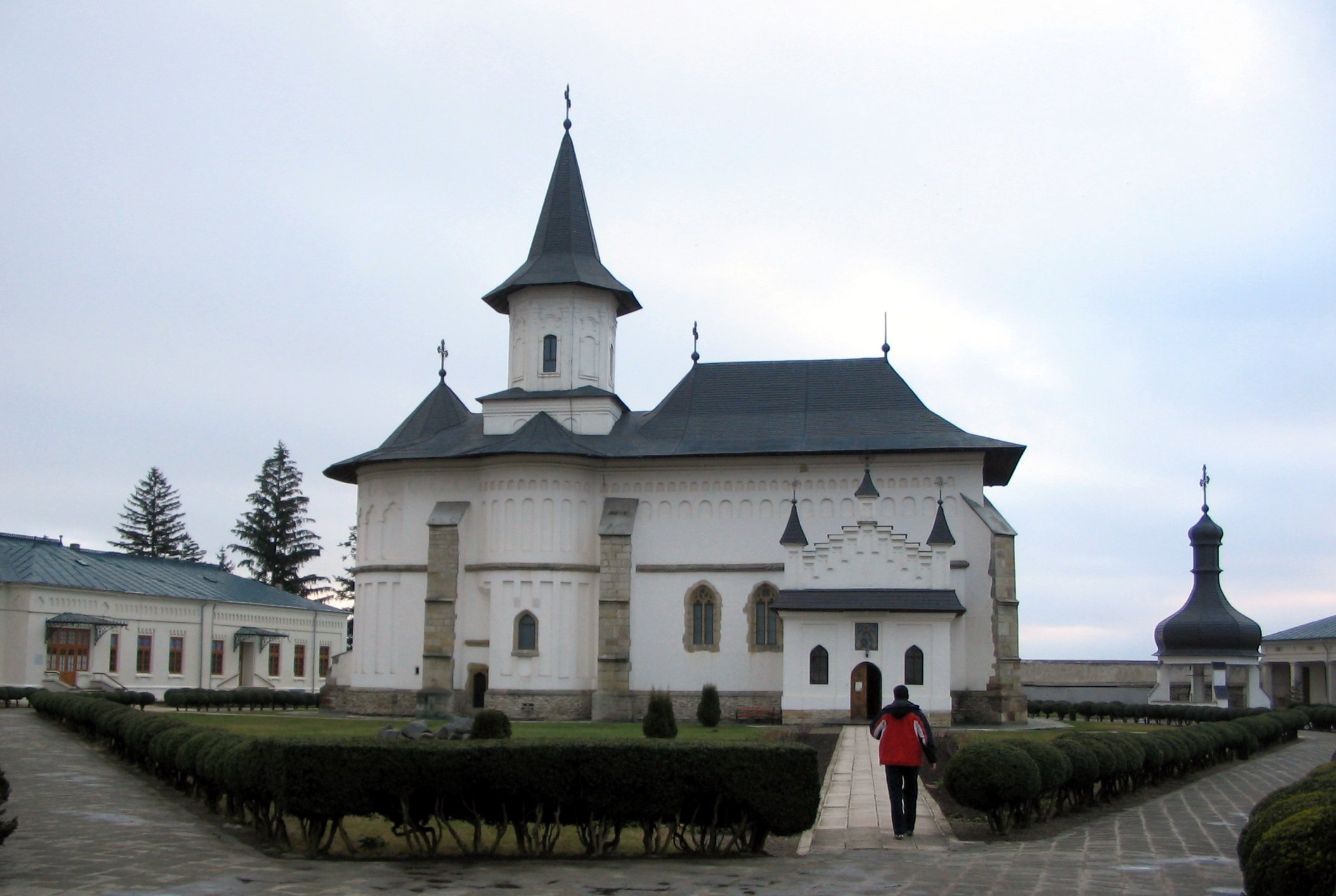
Sfânta Paraschiva Cathedral in Roman

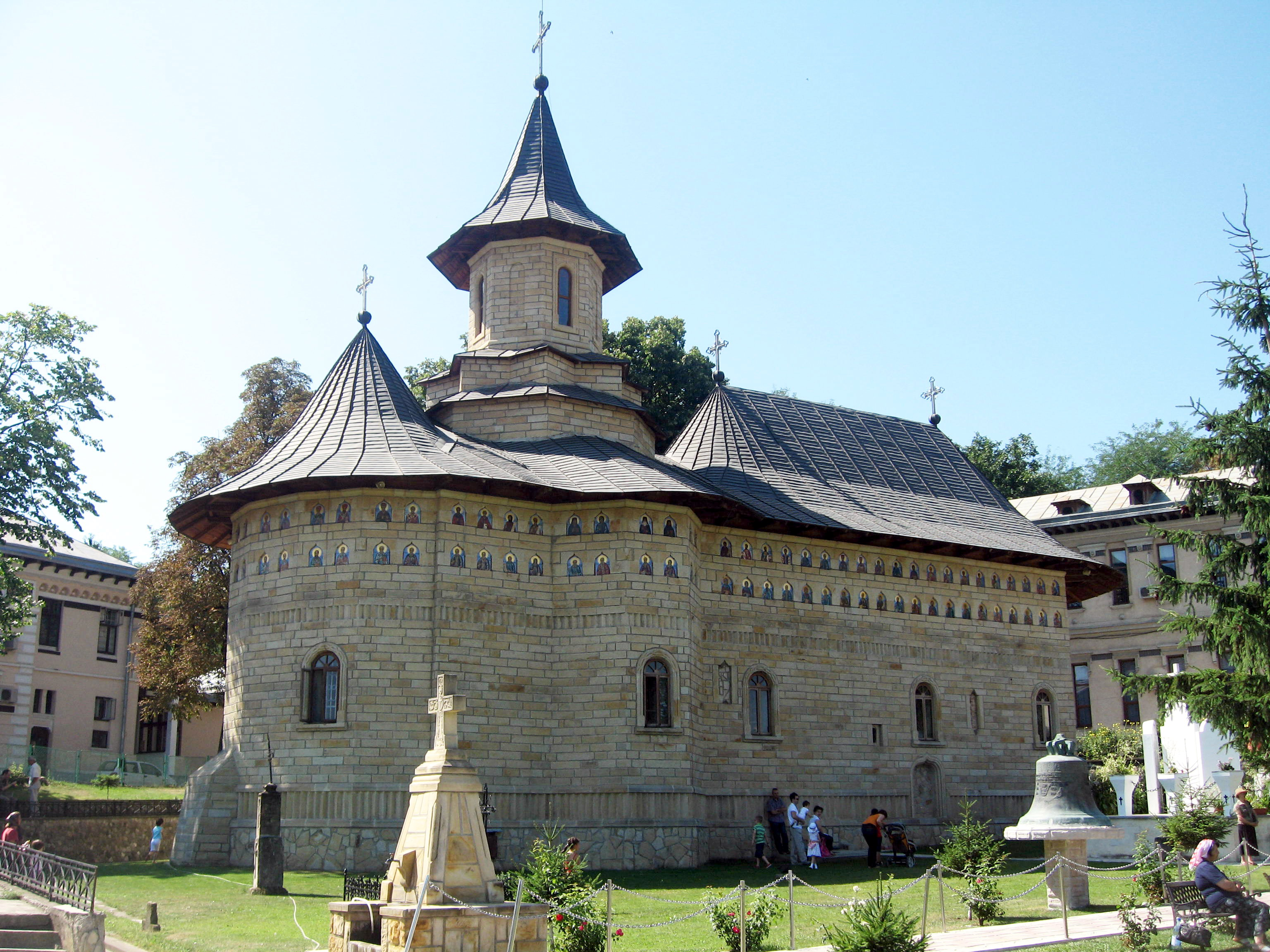
Socola Monastery in Iași

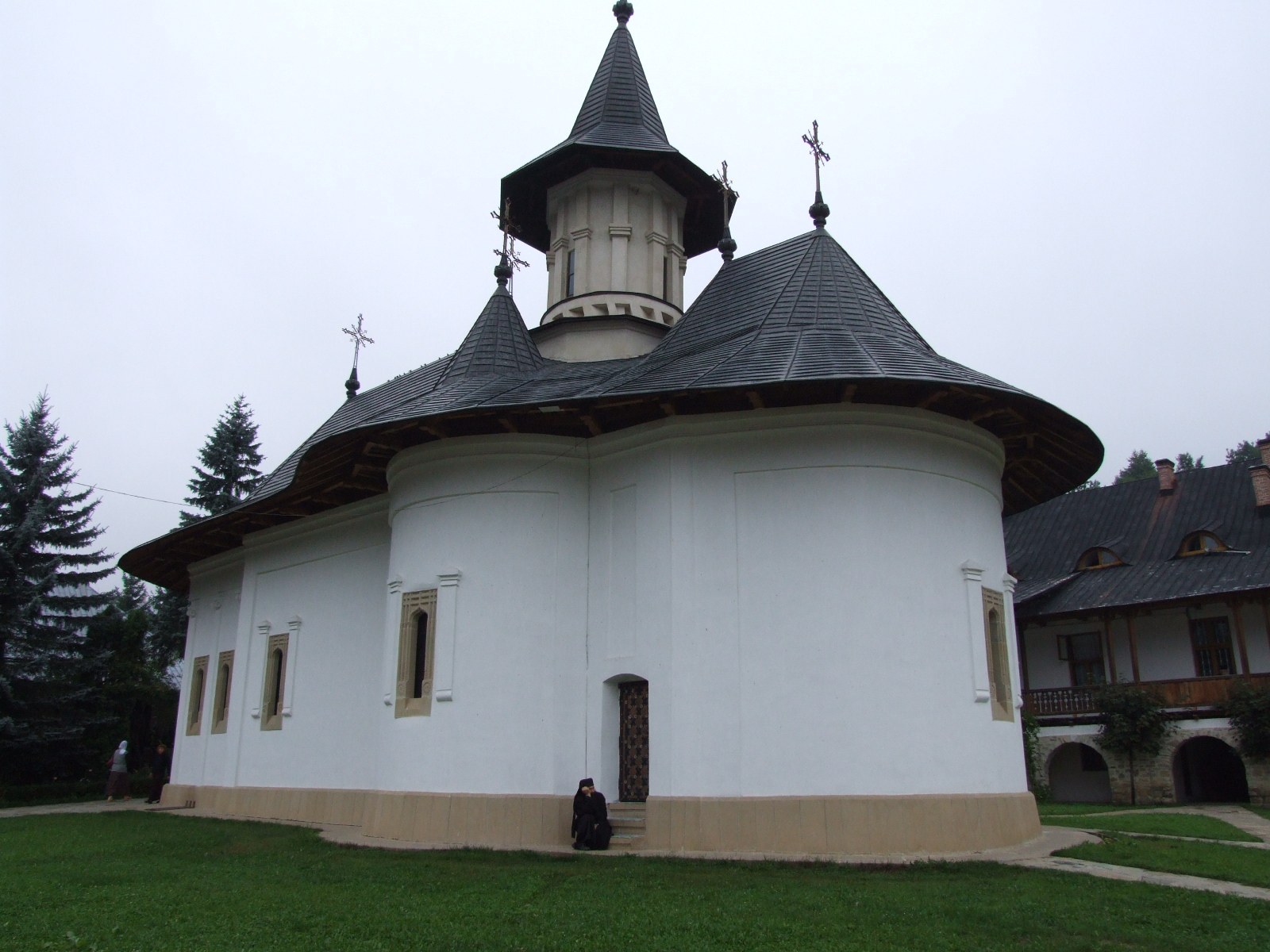
Sihăstria Monastery in Neamț County

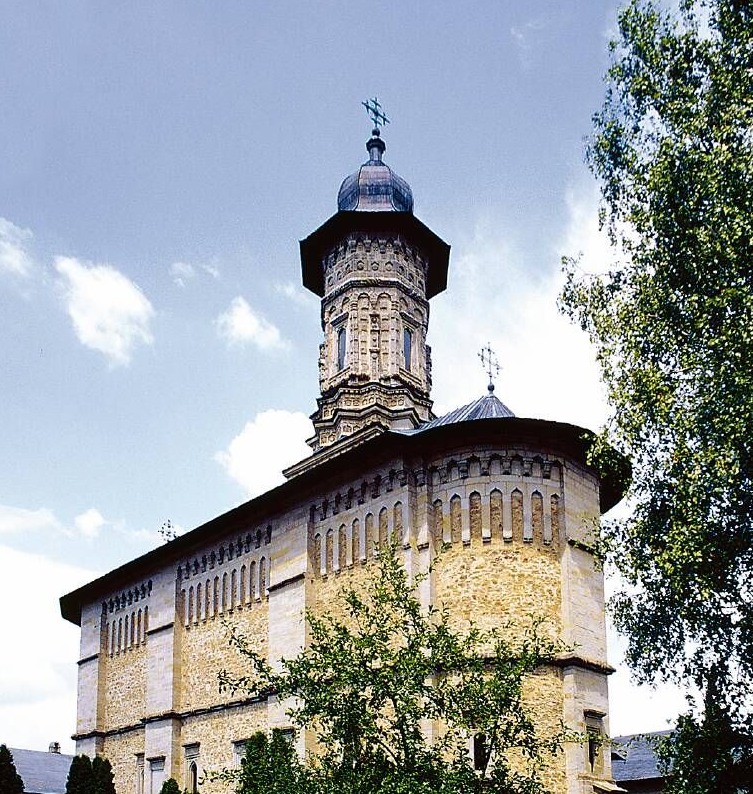
Dragomirna Monastery in Suceava County

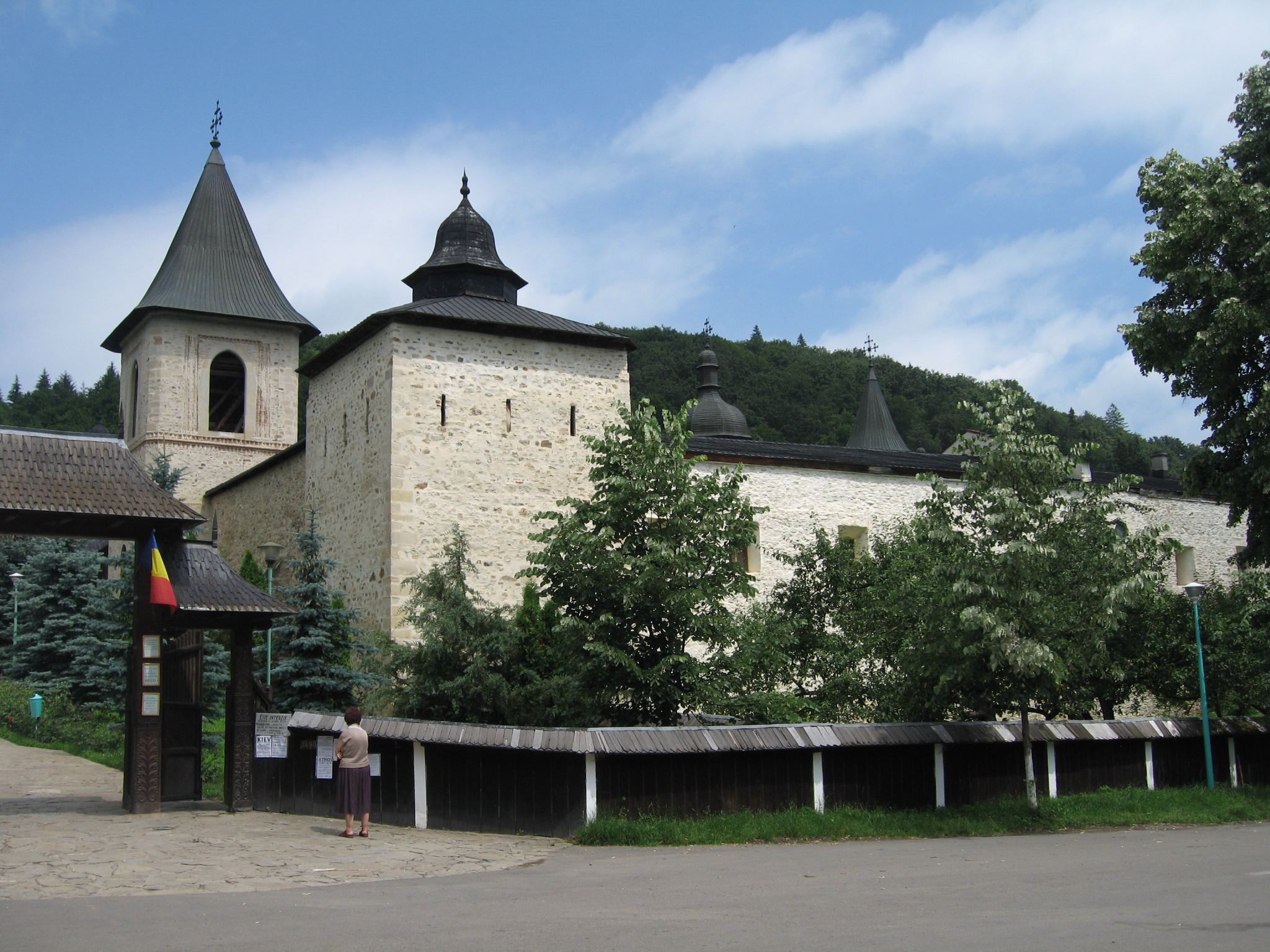
Secu Monastery in Neamț County

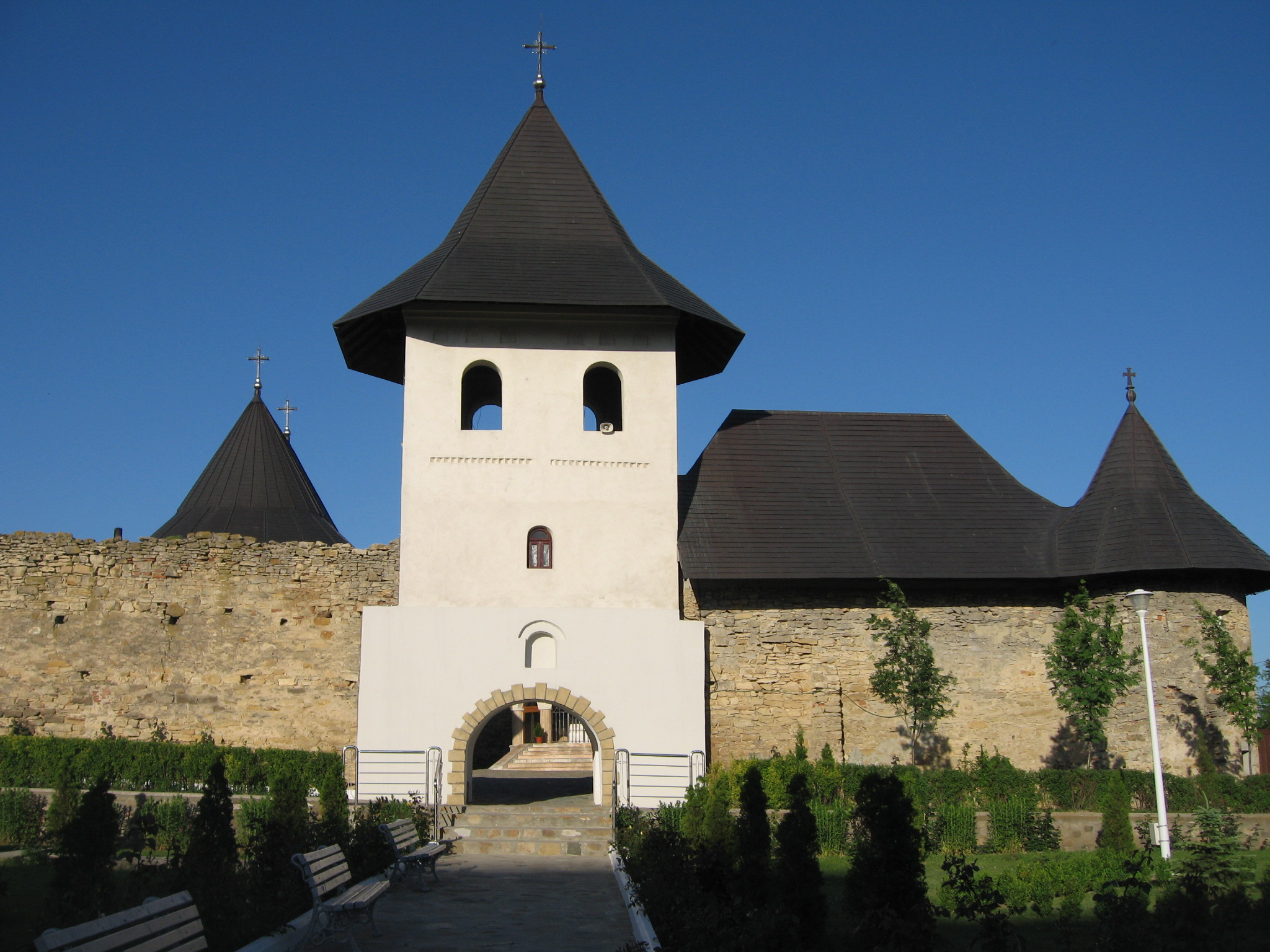
Hadâmbu Monastery in Iași County

== See also ==
- Painted churches of northern Moldavia
- Romanian architecture
