= Teoctist (given name) =

Teochist may refer to:

- Teoctist I of Moldavia (c. 1410–1477), Metropolitan of Moldavia from 1453 to 1477
- Teoctist Arăpașu (born Toader Arăpaşu; 1915–2007), Patriarch of the Romanian Orthodox Church from 1986 to 2007
- Teoctist Blajevici (1807–1879), Metropolitan of Bukovina and Dalmatia

== See also ==
- Theoctistus, another given name
