= Ipotești =

Ipoteşti may refer to:

- Ipotești, Olt, a commune in Olt County, Romania
- Ipotești, Suceava, a commune in Suceava County, Romania
- Ipoteşti, a village in Mihai Eminescu Commune, Botoşani County, Romania
