= Church of the Holy Cross, Pătrăuți =

Orthodox church in Suceava County, Romania

Coordinates: 47.7294°N 26.1930°E

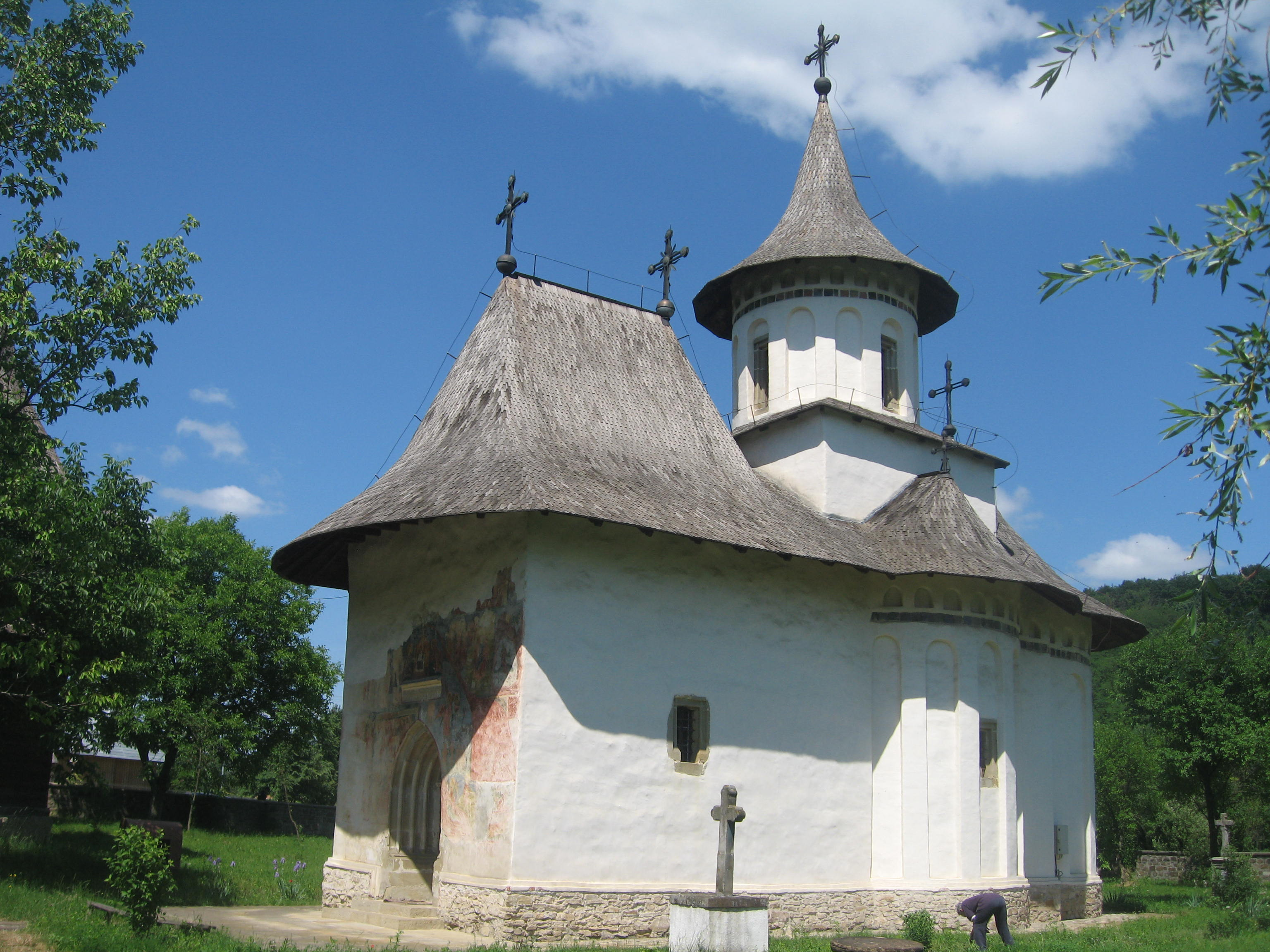
Pătrăuţi church

The Church of the Elevation of the Holy Cross (Romanian: Biserica Înălțarea Sfintei Cruci) is a Romanian Orthodox church in Pătrăuți Commune, Suceava County, Romania. Built in 1487, with Stephen III of Moldavia as ktitor, it is one of eight buildings that make up the churches of Moldavia UNESCO World Heritage Site, and is also listed as a historic monument by the country's Ministry of Culture and Religious Affairs.
