= Teoctist Blajevici =

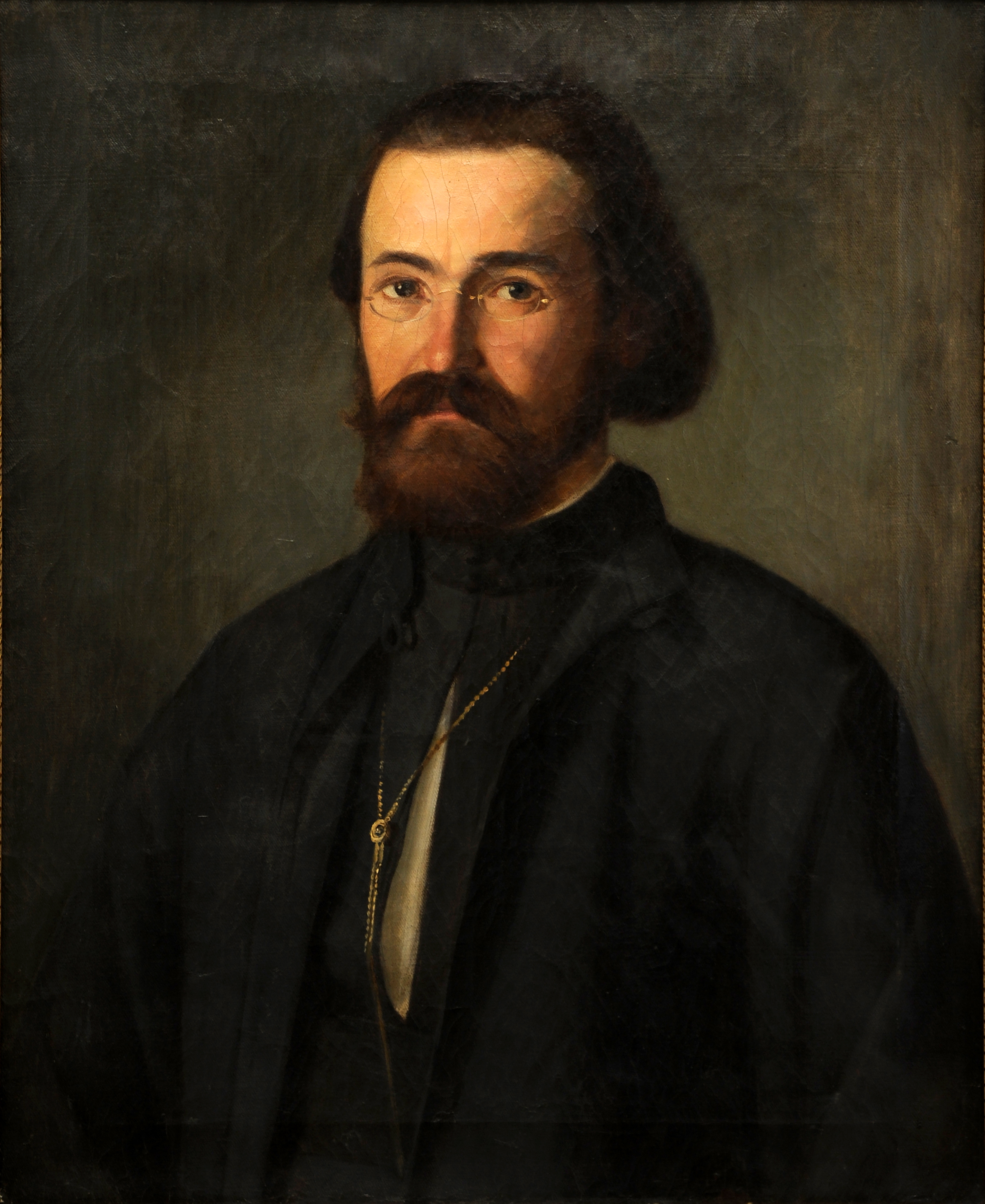
Teoctist Blajevici

Teoctist Blajevici (born Teodor Blajevici, in German Theoktist Ritter von Blažewicz; February 23, 1807 – June 27, 1879) was an ethnic Romanian Orthodox cleric from the Duchy of Bukovina in Austria-Hungary.

Born in Tișăuți village, he attended gymnasium in nearby Suceava, followed by high school and professional training at the theological institute in Cernăuți until 1831. Ordained a priest in 1832, he served in the parishes of Storojineț and Prisăcăreni until 1837. He then became a monk, taking the name Teoctist. He became a spiritual adviser at the theological institute's seminary in 1857. He offered catechism for young seminarians, was part of the diocesan administration, taught as a substitute at the gymnasium and normal school in Cernăuți, was abbot of Dragomirna Monastery (1863–1874) and of Cernăuți Cathedral (1874–1877). He was elected Metropolitan of Bukovina and Dalmatia in 1877, serving until his death in Cernăuți two years later. An erudite man, he wrote poems and fables in a vivid folk language. Publishing both in books and magazines, he used the pen name Teoctist Șoimul ("the falcon"). He wrote a Romanian-language grammar and three religion textbooks, making him among the first Romanian authors of school textbooks in these subjects.
