= Theoctistus =

Theoctistus or Theoktistos (Greek: Θεόκτιστος) is a Greek name derived from θεος theos, "god", and κτίσμα ktisma, "creation, edifice, foundation", the resulting combination being translated to "creation of God", "godly creation".

Theoctistus or Theoktistos may refer to, chronologically:

- Theoctistus of Caesarea (2nd–3rd centuries), bishop; see Origen
- Theoctistus of Alexandria (3rd century), a sea captain, martyr, saint, and companion of Faustus, Abibus and Dionysius of Alexandria (martyred 250)
- Theoctistus of Palestine (died 451 or 467), Byzantine monk, hermit and Orthodox saint, active in Palestine, companion of Euthymius the Great with whom he established a monastery, commemorated on September 3
- Theoctistus of Sicily (died 800), hegumen of Cucomo Monastery in Sicily and Orthodox saint, commemorated on January 4
- Theoktistos (magistros) (fl. 802–821), senior Byzantine official
- Theoctistus of Naples, Duke of Naples in 818–821
- Theoktistos Bryennios (fl. c. 842), Byzantine general
- Theoktistos, chief minister and regent of the Byzantine Empire from 842 to 855
- Theoktistos the Stoudite, 14th century Byzantine monk, hagiographer, and hymnographer

== See also ==
- Teoctist (given name)
