= Ipotești, Suceava =

Ipotești
- Commune
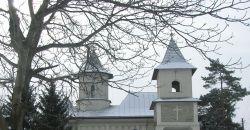
- Orthodox church in Ipotești

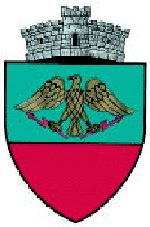
- Coat of arms

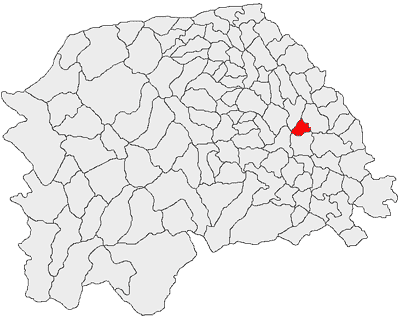
- Location in Suceava County

- Location in Romania
- Coordinates: 47°37′N 26°17′E
- Country: Romania
- County: Suceava

Government
  - Mayor (2020–2024): Dumitru Gulei (PNL)
- Area: 22.82 km^{2} (8.81 sq mi)
- Elevation: 368 m (1,207 ft)
- Highest elevation: 385 m (1,263 ft)
- Lowest elevation: 343 m (1,125 ft)
- Population (2021-12-01): 9,346
  - Density: 409.6/km^{2} (1,061/sq mi)
- Time zone: UTC+02:00 (EET)
  - Summer (DST): UTC+03:00 (EEST)
- Postal code: 727325
- Area code: +40 230
- Vehicle reg.: SV
- Website: www.primariaipotesti.ro

Ipotești (German: Ipotestie) is a commune located in Suceava County, in the historical region of Bukovina, northeastern Romania. It is composed of three villages: Ipotești, Lisaura, and Tișăuți. The commune is primarily inhabited by Romanians.

== Administration and local politics ==
=== Commune council ===
The commune's current local council has the following political composition, according to the results of the 2020 Romanian local elections:

Party	Seats	Current Council
National Liberal Party (PNL)	7	
Social Democratic Party (PSD)	3	
People's Movement Party (PMP)	3	
PRO Romania (PRO)	2	

== Natives ==
- Teoctist Blajevici (1807 – 1879), Romanian Orthodox cleric
