= Pătrăuți =

- Commune
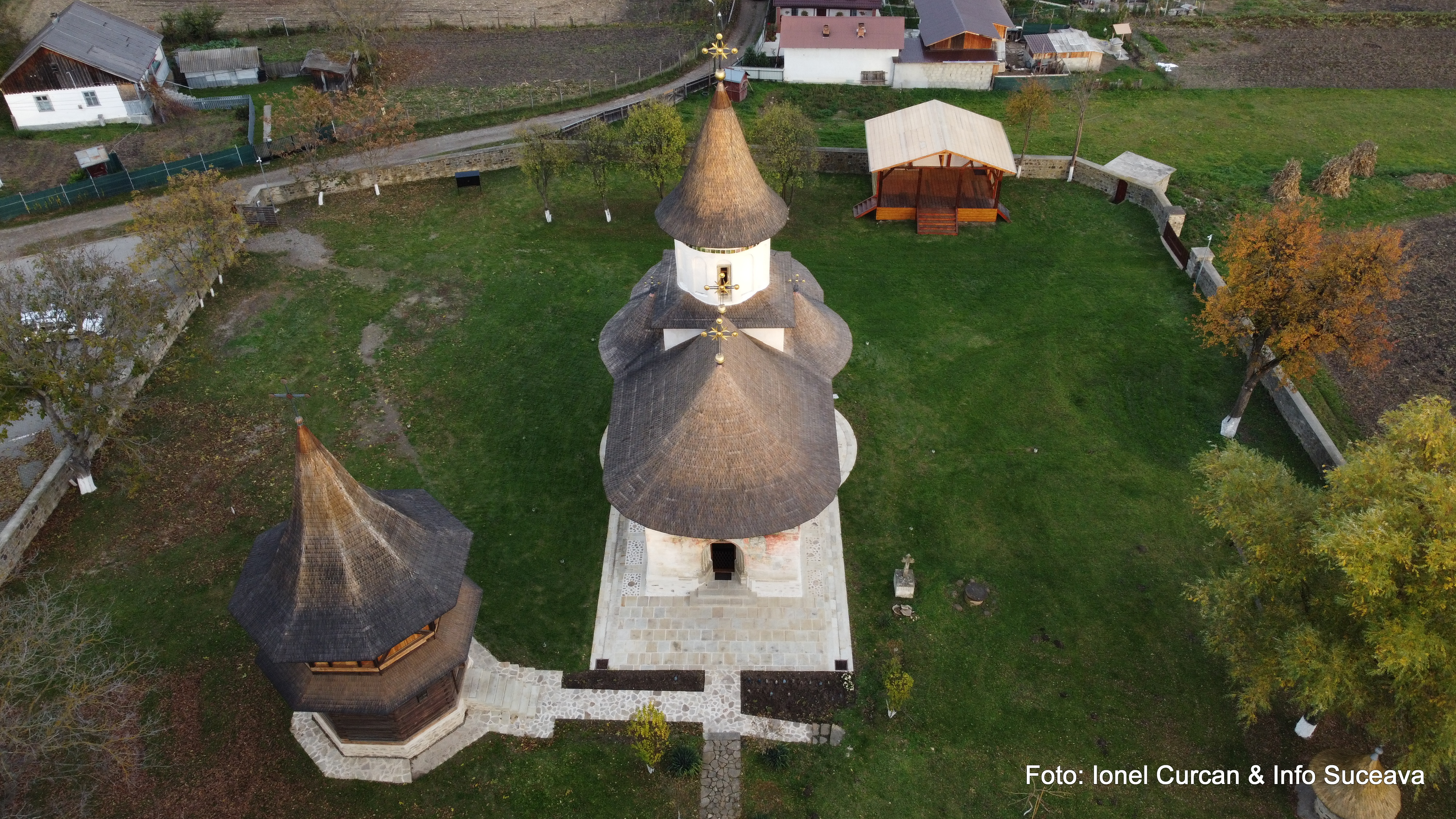
- Church of the Exaltation of the Holy Cross in Pătrăuți

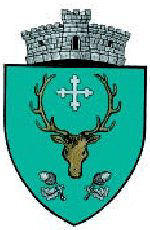
- Coat of arms

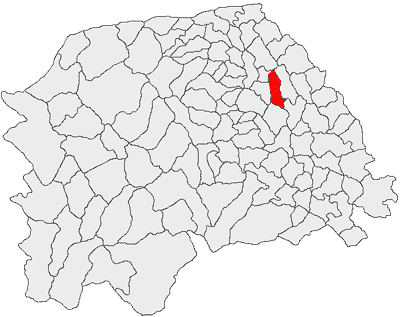
- Location in Suceava County

- Location in Romania
- Coordinates: 47°43′N 26°11′E
- Country: Romania
- County: Suceava

Government
  - Mayor (2020–2024): Adrian Isepciuc (PSD)
- Area: 37.73 km^{2} (14.57 sq mi)
- Elevation: 333 m (1,093 ft)
- Population (2021-12-01): 4,890
  - Density: 130/km^{2} (336/sq mi)
- Time zone: UTC+02:00 (EET)
  - Summer (DST): UTC+03:00 (EEST)
- Postal code: 727420
- Area code: +(40) 230
- Vehicle reg.: SV
- Website: primariapatrautisv.ro

Pătrăuți (German: Petroutz bei Suczawa) is a commune located in Suceava County, Romania. It is composed of a single village, Pătrăuți.

The Church of the Holy Cross is located in the commune.
