= Byzantium After Byzantium =

1935 book by Nicolae Iorga

- Author: Nicolae Iorga
- Original title: Bizanț după Bizanț
- Language: Romanian
- Genre: Non-fiction
- Publication date: 1935

Byzantium after Byzantium (Bizanț după Bizanț in Romanian; Byzance après Byzance in French) is a 1935 book by the Romanian historian Nicolae Iorga, which gave its name to a national cultural movement. It refers to the Byzantine imperial influence on the political, social, cultural, and intellectual development of the principalities of Wallachia and Moldavia. The book deals with the impact of the fall of the Byzantine Empire on European civilization, the legacy and the continuation of Byzantine institutions and culture.

== Editions ==
- Iorga, Nicolae (1935). Byzance après Byzance. Archived from the original on June 12, 2018. French edition online by the University of Bucharest
