= Dragomirna Monastery =

Eastern Orthodox monastery in Mitocu Dragomirnei, Romania

Coordinates: 47°45′27″N 26°13′48″E

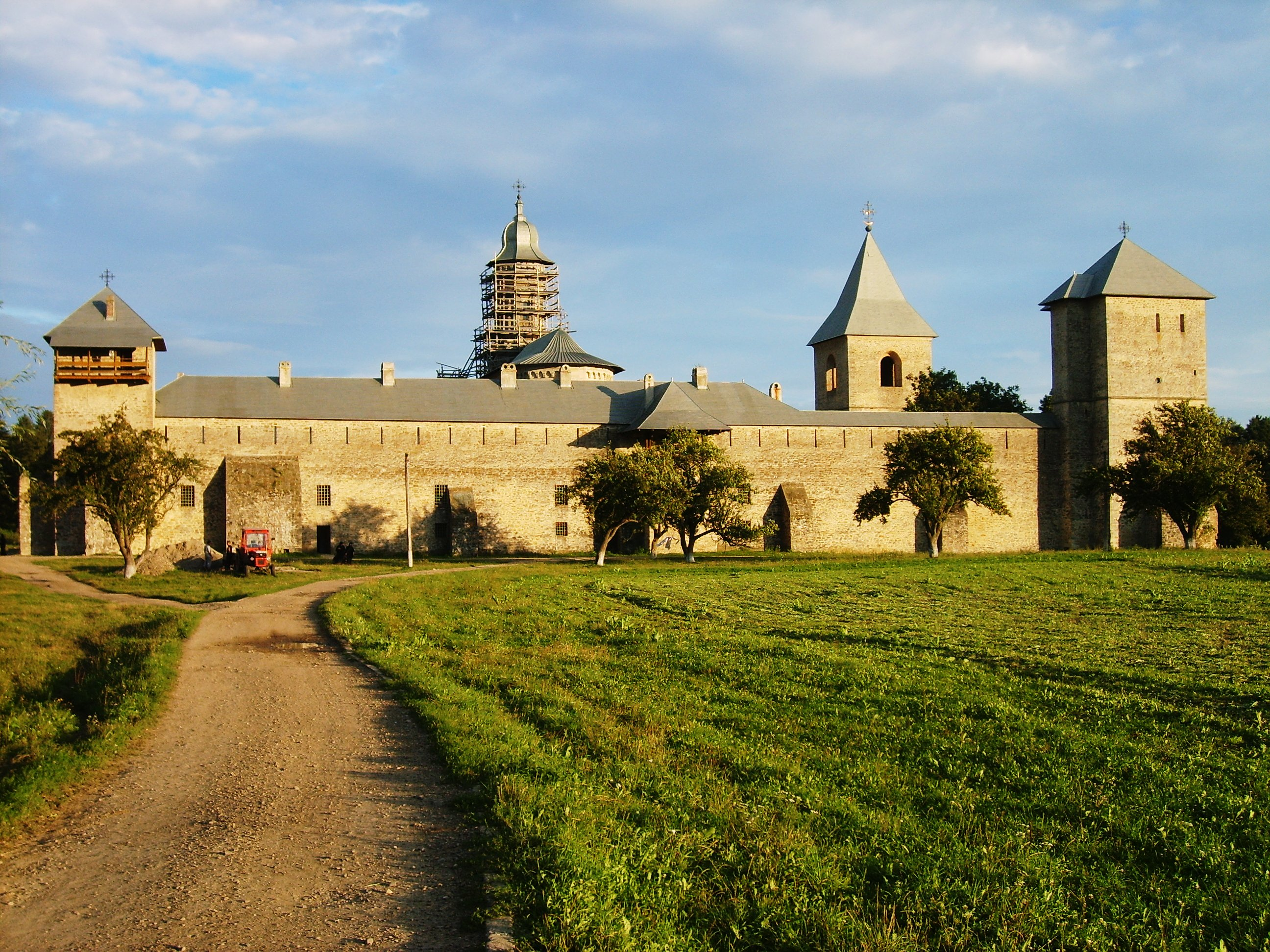
The Dragomirna Monastery - view from the North.

The Dragomirna Monastery was built during the first three decades of the 17th century, 15 km from Suceava, in the Mitocu Dragomirnei commune. It is the tallest medieval monastery in northern Moldavia and renowned in Orthodox architecture for its unique proportions and intricate details, mostly carved into stone. It lies among forested hills of fir and oak. The history of the monastery started in 1602, when the small church in the graveyard was built and dedicated to Saints Enoch, Elijah, and John the Theologian. In 1609 the dedication of the larger church was made to the "Descent of the Holy Spirit".

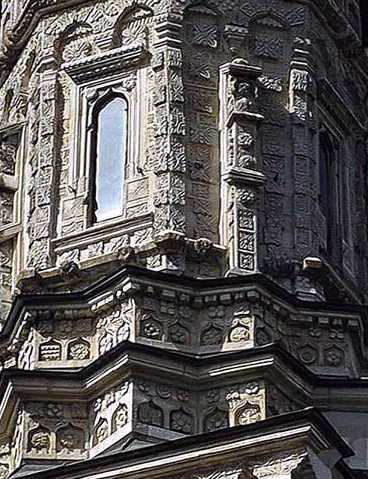
The Dragomirna Monastery - view of the tower of the church

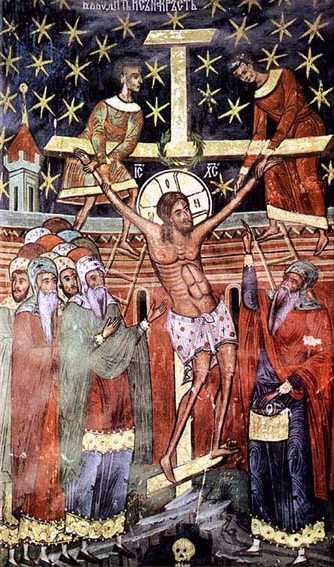
The Dragomirna Monastery - fresco

== Gallery ==
The Dragomirna Monastery Museum - Miniature 1

The Dragomirna Monastery Museum - Miniature 2

The Dragomirna Monastery Museum - Miniature 3

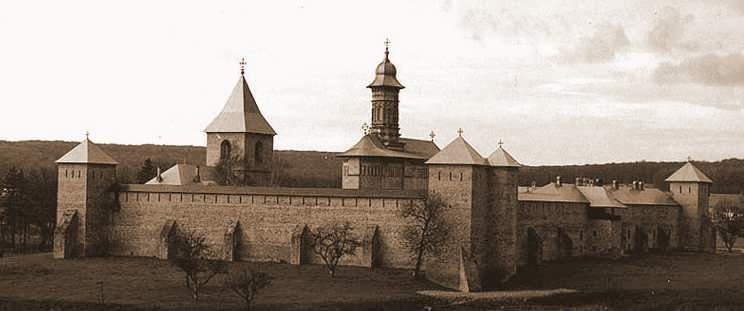
The Dragomirna Monastery

== See also ==
- Churches of Moldavia
