= Galata Monastery =

Heritage site in Iași, Romania

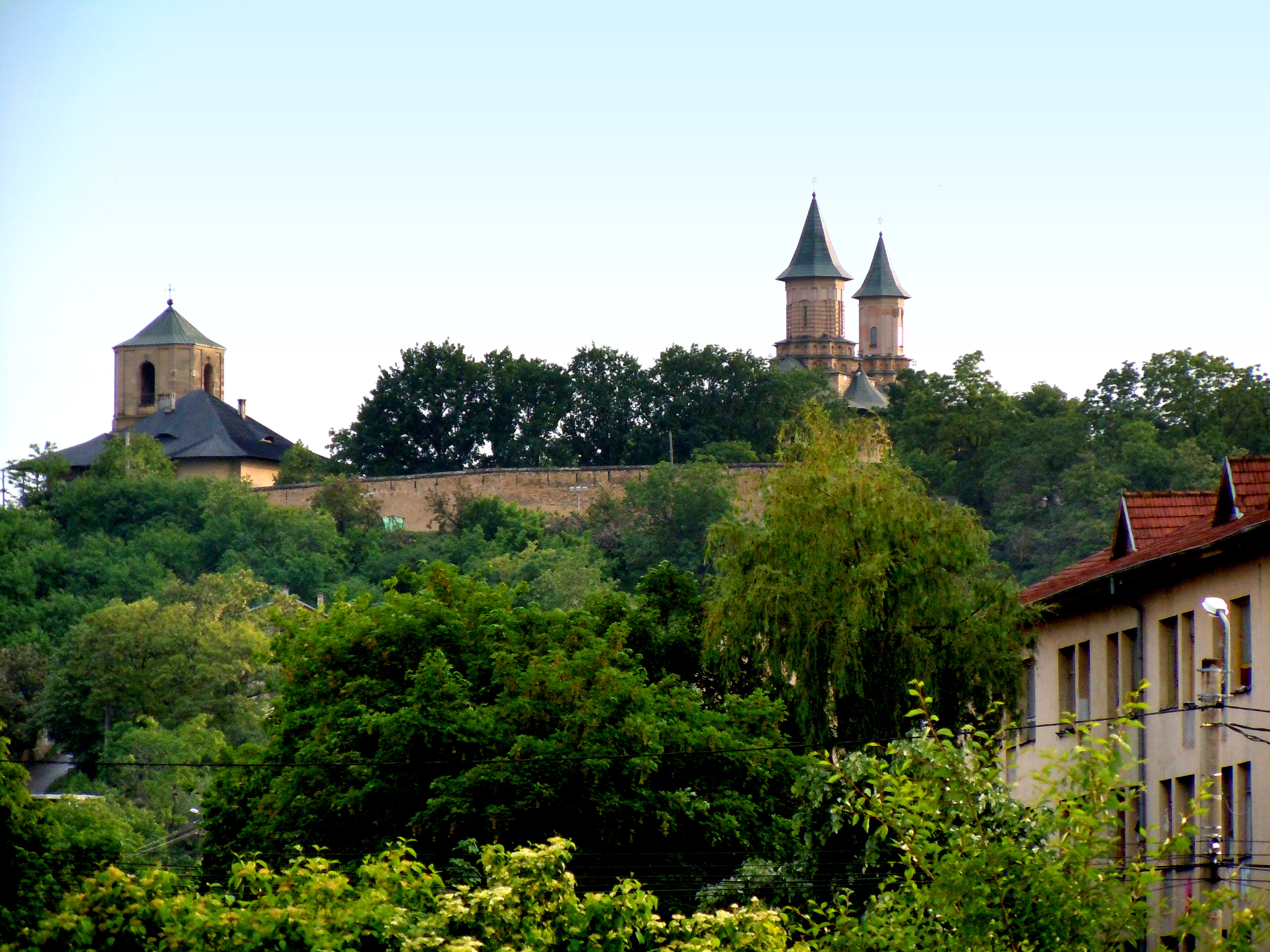

Religion
- Affiliation: Eastern Orthodox
- Ecclesiastical or organisational status: Nunnery
- Status: Active

Location
- Location: Monastery Street 4, Iași, Romania
- Interactive map of Galata Monastery
- Coordinates: 47°08′47″N 27°34′8″E

Architecture
- Architect: Peter the Lame
- Type: Fortified church
- Style: Moldavian
- Groundbreaking: 1582
- Completed: 1584
- Materials: Stone, brick

The Galata Monastery (Romanian: Mănăstirea Galata) is a Romanian Orthodox monastery for nuns, founded at the end of the sixteenth century by Moldavian Voivode Petru Șchiopul, in the west of Iași, Romania. The monastery is located on the top of Galata Hill and can be easily observed from different locations of Iași. The church, surrounded by walls with loopholes and provided with a bell tower at the entrance, looks like a fortress, often serving as a place of defense and sometimes as a royal residence. Near the church on the hill are places that provide panoramic views over the city.

The Galata Monastery is listed in the National Register of Historic Monuments and consists of the following four buildings:

- Church "Resurrection" – dating from the period 1582–1583.
- Prince's Palace – dating back to 1726–1728.
- The bell tower – dating back to 1584.
- The fortified wall – dating from 1584.

== History ==
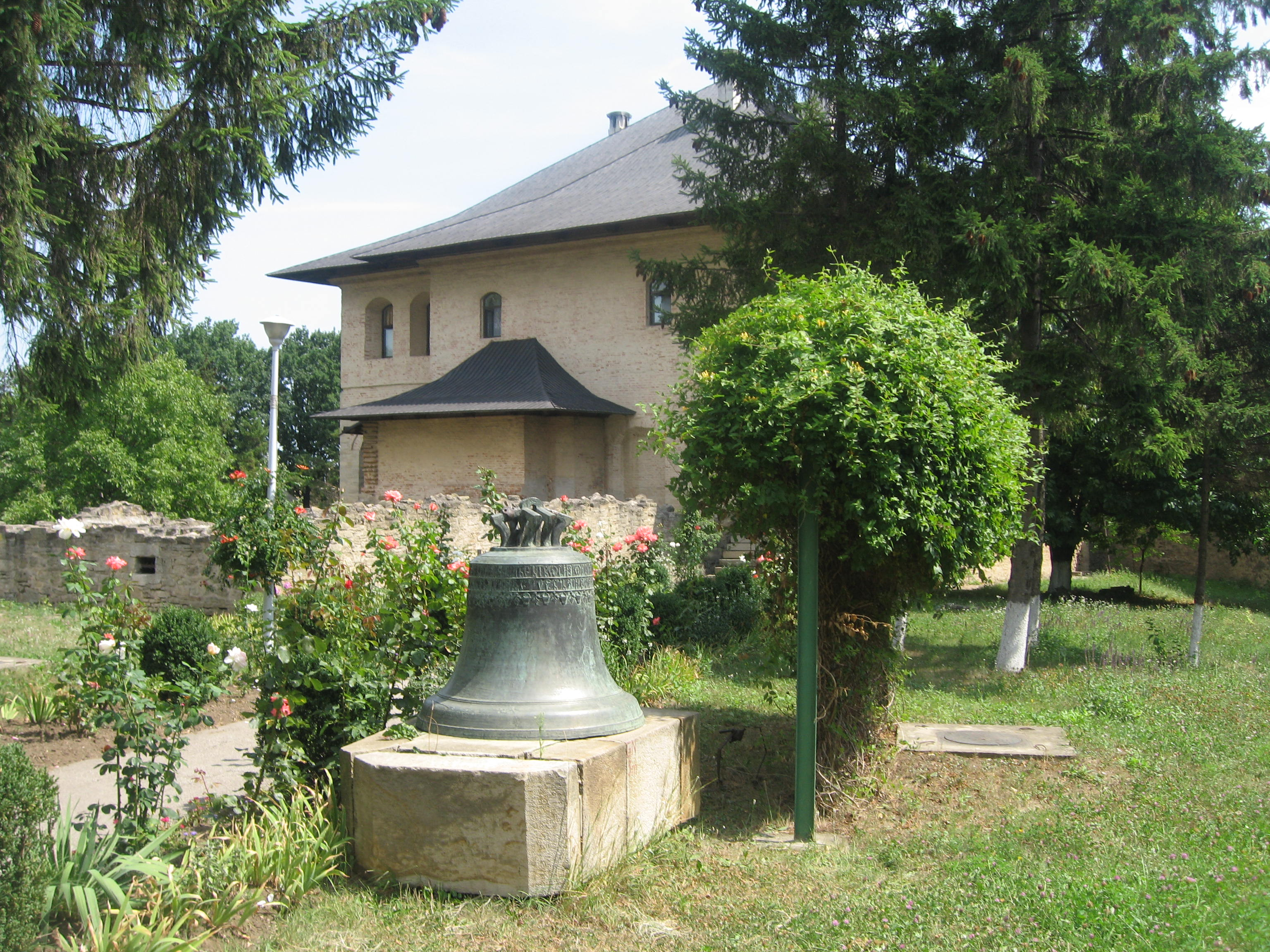
The Moldavian prince's residence at Galata Monastery

=== Galata from the Valley (Galata din Vale) ===
Before building the existing monastery, Voivode Petru Șchiopul founded a monastery, named Galata from the Valley. Its name comes from the neighborhood with the same name from Constantinople (today's Istanbul), where Romanian rulers used to find shelter when they went to the Sublime Porte.

In the summer of 1577, in its first reign, the Voivode sent a letter to the leaders of Bistrița in which he requested specialists in construction, being dissatisfied by the Moldavian constructors. Therefore, it can be concluded that the construction of the monastery began in autumn 1577. It is assumed that the monastery consecration ceremony took place before February 22, 1578, when the ruler and the metropolitan bishops have constituted its main patrimony. The chronicler Grigore Ureche also wrote in his books about the foundation of the monastery in 1578.

Unfortunately, given the fact that land on which was situated was unstable, the monastery walls were crumbling. The bell from the old church still resist in the yard of the existing monastery.

=== Monastery Foundation ===
Following the demolition of the first church, the Voivode founded a second church on a hill near the city, overlooking the Nicolina River valley. The church (which has been dedicated to "Resurrection" and was known as the "Galata of the Hill") was built between 1582 and 1584 and was consecrated in 1584.
