= Argel =

Argel can refer to:

- Solenostemma arghel, a plant
- Spanish and Portuguese name of Algiers, or in English texts translated from Spanish or Portuguese
- Argel, a village in Moldovița Commune, Suceava County, Romania
- Argel (river), a tributary of the Moldovița in Suceava County, Romania
- Argel, Armenia
- Argel Fuchs (born 1974), a Brazilian football (soccer) player, played for Brazil
