= Moldavian vault =

Architectural element of religious architecture in Moldavia

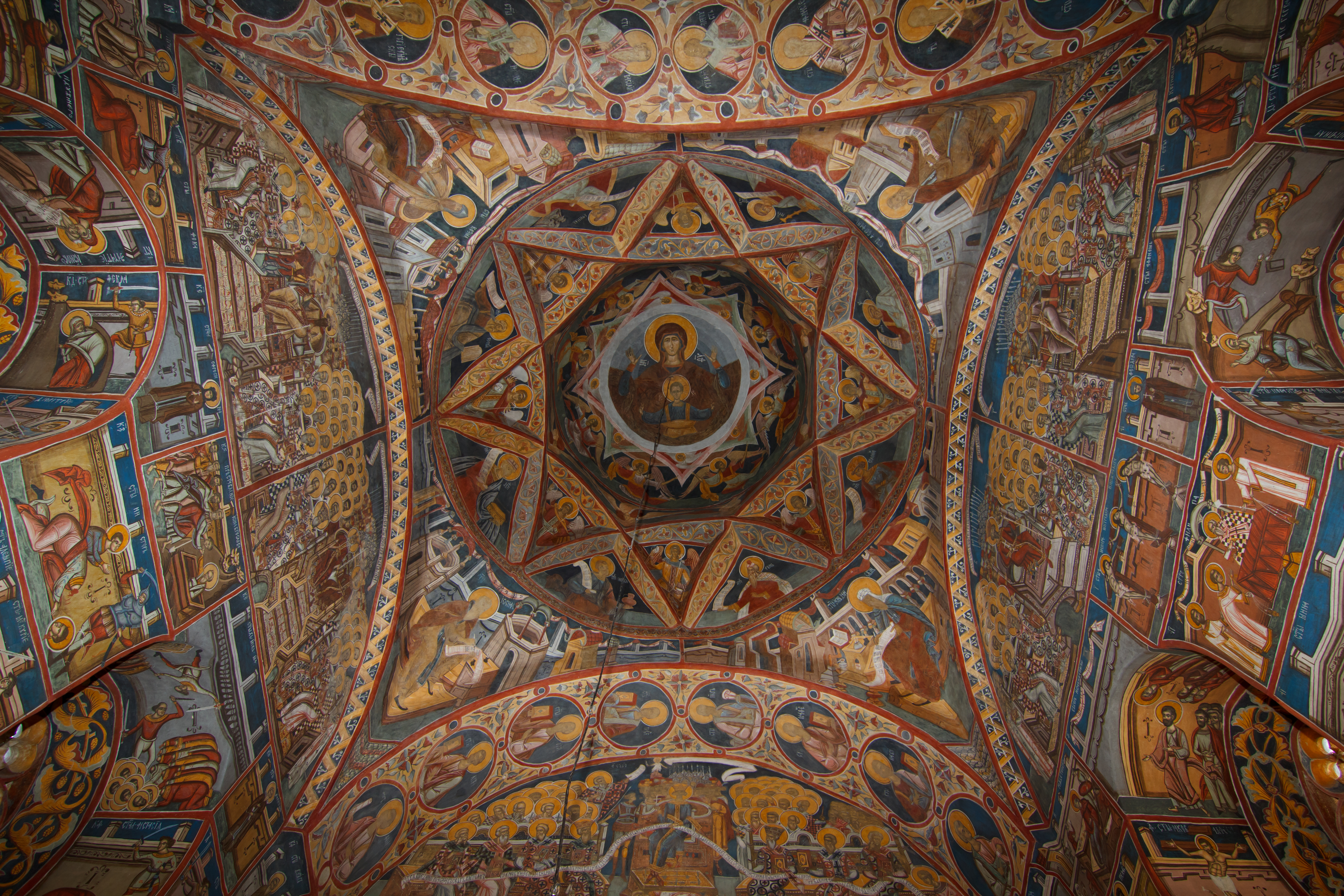
The interior of the Church of the Annunciation in the Moldovița Monastery complex, 16th century, Vatra Moldoviței, Romania

The Moldavian vault (Romanian: bolta moldovenească) is an architectural element of religious architecture used from the 15th to the 17th century in Moldavia. It is an arched suspension system on pendentives. It was mostly located above the naos or the main nave of the temple. The vault creates a transition from a square plane to a circular plane leading to a dome or tholobate tower. Consists of four diagonal arches over which pendentives transform square the circle. Four smaller segment arches in turn transform the circle into a square. Gradually they rise above the nave and crown the dome or tholobate tower. The vault allows a significant reduction in the diameter and weight of the tholobate, the dome and the tower itself.

== History ==
The location of the Moldavian vault in the cross-section of the Church of St. Nicholas in the complex Probota Monastery, 16th century, Romania

In Moldavia there is a merging of Eastern and Western architectural traditions. Significant development of religious architecture in the Principality of Moldavia mainly occurred in the 15th and 16th centuries.The local architecture drew heavily on Palaeologan Renaissance and the architecture of the Post-Byzantine period, especially from the Serbian Morava architectural school. However, the influences of Western architecture are also visible; many churches include Gothic and Renaissance elements.

The Moldavian vault is based on a folded dome on pendentives used in Byzantine architecture. The arched suspension system on the pendentives creates a transition from a square plane to a circular plane leading to a dome or tholobate tower. The transformation of the Byzantine vault system to the Moldavian one resulted in the expansion of the interior space and a reduction in the diameter or weight of the tholobate tower.

According to some experts, the Moldavian vault has its origins in Armenian or Oriental architecture, as there is a similarity between the design of the Armenian vault with an oculus (galhatun) and the Moldavian vault. This hypothesis is supported by, among other factors, the emigration of Armenian craftsmen to the areas to regions of Galicia and Moldavia at the end of the 15th century. Some historians see the origin of the Moldavian vault in Russian wooden architecture, where the structural elements are reduced in favour of the expansion of the interior space. According to other historians of art, there is also a parallel of the Moldavian vault with the complex muqarnas vault system in Moorish or Islamic architecture. A small number of experts consider the Moldavian vault to be a Gothic solution.

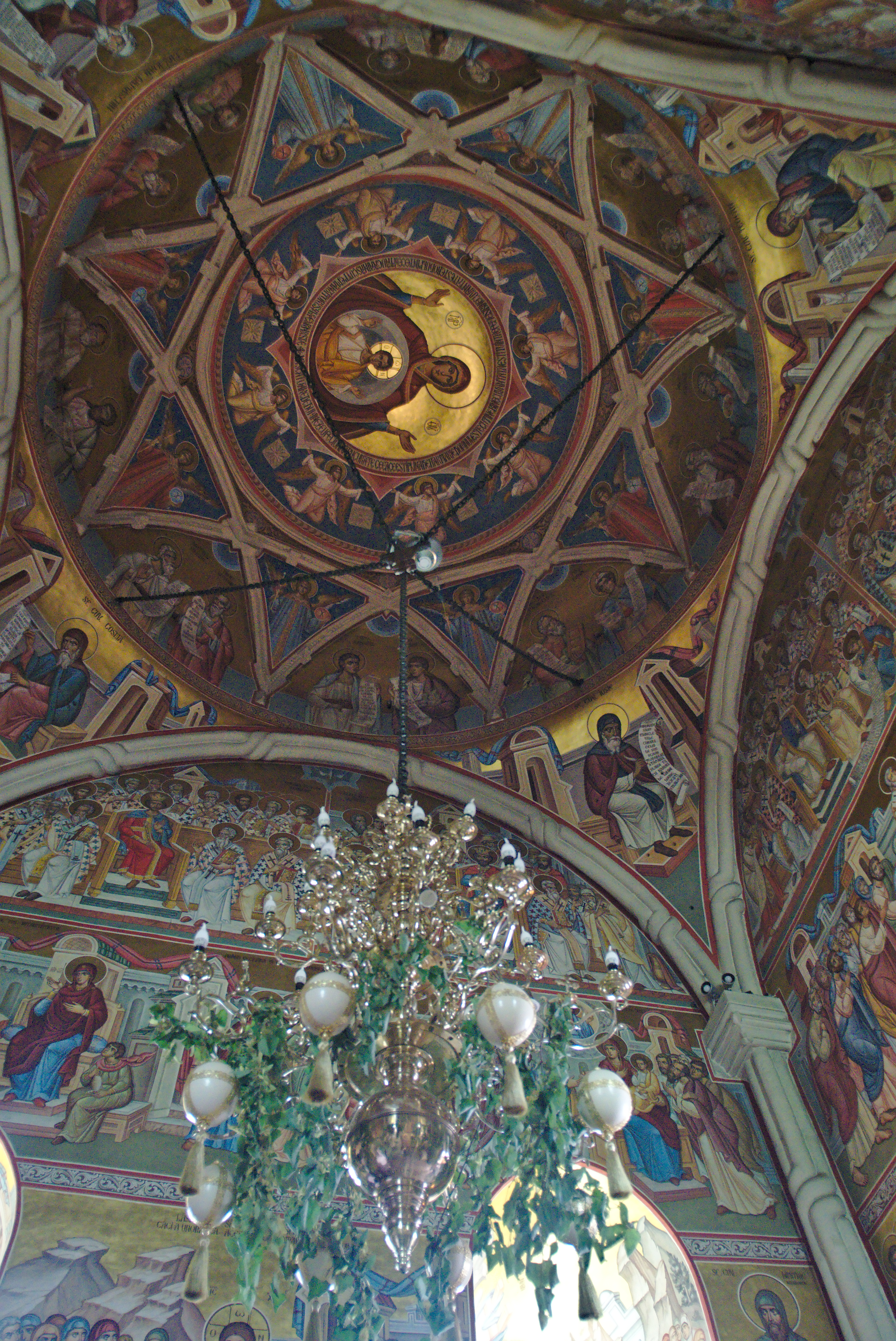
The interior of the Church of the Dormition of the Mother of God in the Putna monastery, 15th century, Romania

From the end of the 14th century, there were construction experiments in Moldavia that have lightened the weight from a tower with a small diameter. The columns were replaced by a corbel. This innovative solution first appears in the Old Church of the Moldovița Monastery. The technical solutions were probably optimized at the beginning of the 15th century. The Moldavian vault first appears during the reign of the Moldavian prince Stephen the Great in the Exaltation of the Holy Cross Church in Pătrăuți from 1487.

The reduction of the diameter of the tower was used to cover the space of the so-called blind arches on the side arches, but also the dome, where the original purpose later lost its meaning. The second variant of the Moldavian vault has inset arches or a star-shaped vault. Its structural peculiarity lies in the placement of eight arches on the inner side of the dome. This variant is dominated by a Gothic influence, which is reflected in the use of a number of arches instead of four, eight or more. An example may be found in the St. George Church in Hârlău. It was built around 1492. This variant appears more frequently during the reigns of Princes Petru Rareș and Alexander IV. Lăpușneanu. An example is the Descent of the Holy Spirit Church in Dragomirna Monastery. In the 15th century, under the influence of Western architecture, the base of the tower became more diverse and complex. Together with the vaulting, the shape of the tower was gradually adjusted. Together with the thobolate, it changes from circular to polygonal, which can be seen, for example, in the St. George Church in Voroneț from 1488 or in the St. Nicholas Church in Probota from 1530 and the Annunciation Church from 1532 in Vatra Moldoviței.

In the 16th century, a newer variant was framed by arches. Sometimes it also appears in the form of overhanging ribs of the dome vault, which reduce the diameter of the dome itself. Such a solution can be seen, for example, in the Beheading of St. John the Baptist Church from 1502 in Arbore. A characteristic feature of later buildings is the construction of an additional tower above the nave and the replacement of Gothic decorative elements with Renaissance and Baroque. The most important buildings were built around the town of Iași. These are, for example, Galata Monastery built between 1576 and 1584, the Trei Ierarhi Monastery built between 1635 and 1639 and Feast of the Ascension Church in the Golia Monastery complex built between 1650 and 1653. In the 18th and 19th centuries, traditional Moldavian architecture was completely replaced by the architecture of classicism. At the end of the 19th and middle of the 20th century, it was revived in historicist architecture, represented, for example, by the Cathedral of the Three Holy Hierarchs built between 1937 and 1940 in Timișoara.

== Gallery ==
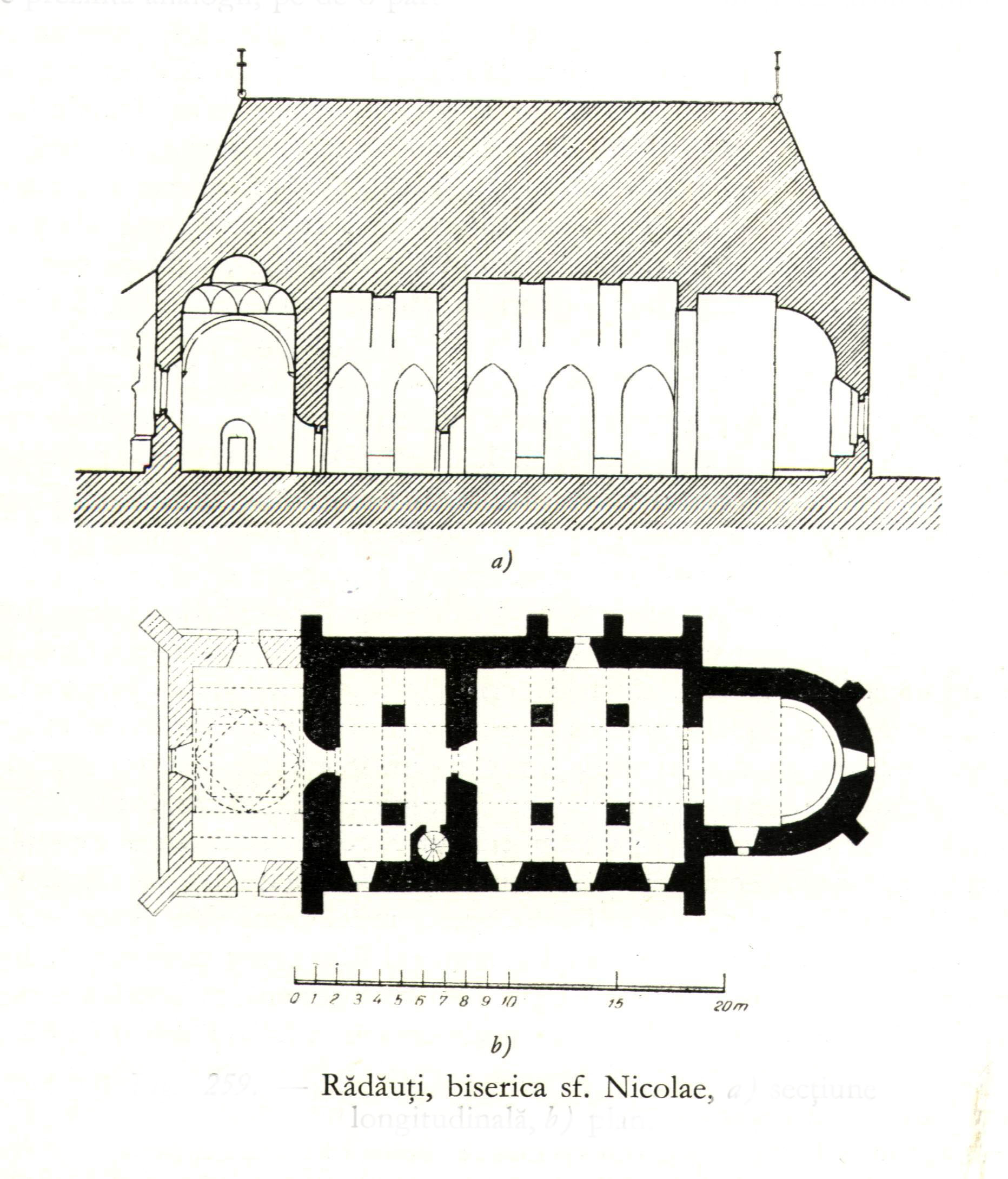
Cross section and floor plan of the Church of St. Nicholas in the Bogdana Monastery. 14th century, Rădăuți, Romania

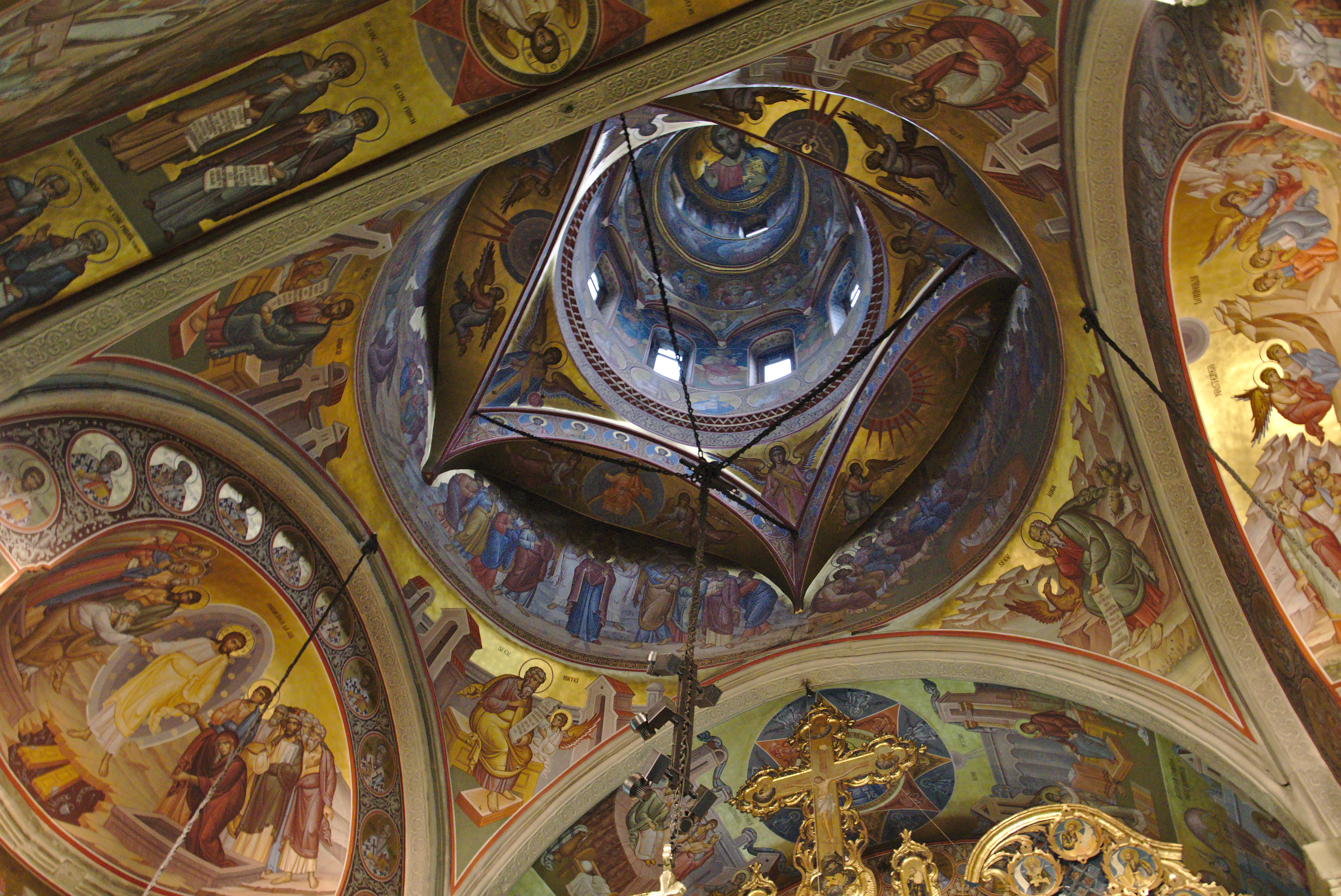
The interior Church of the Assumption of Virgin Mary in the Putna monastery, view of the Moldavian vault, 15th century, Putna, Suceava, Romania

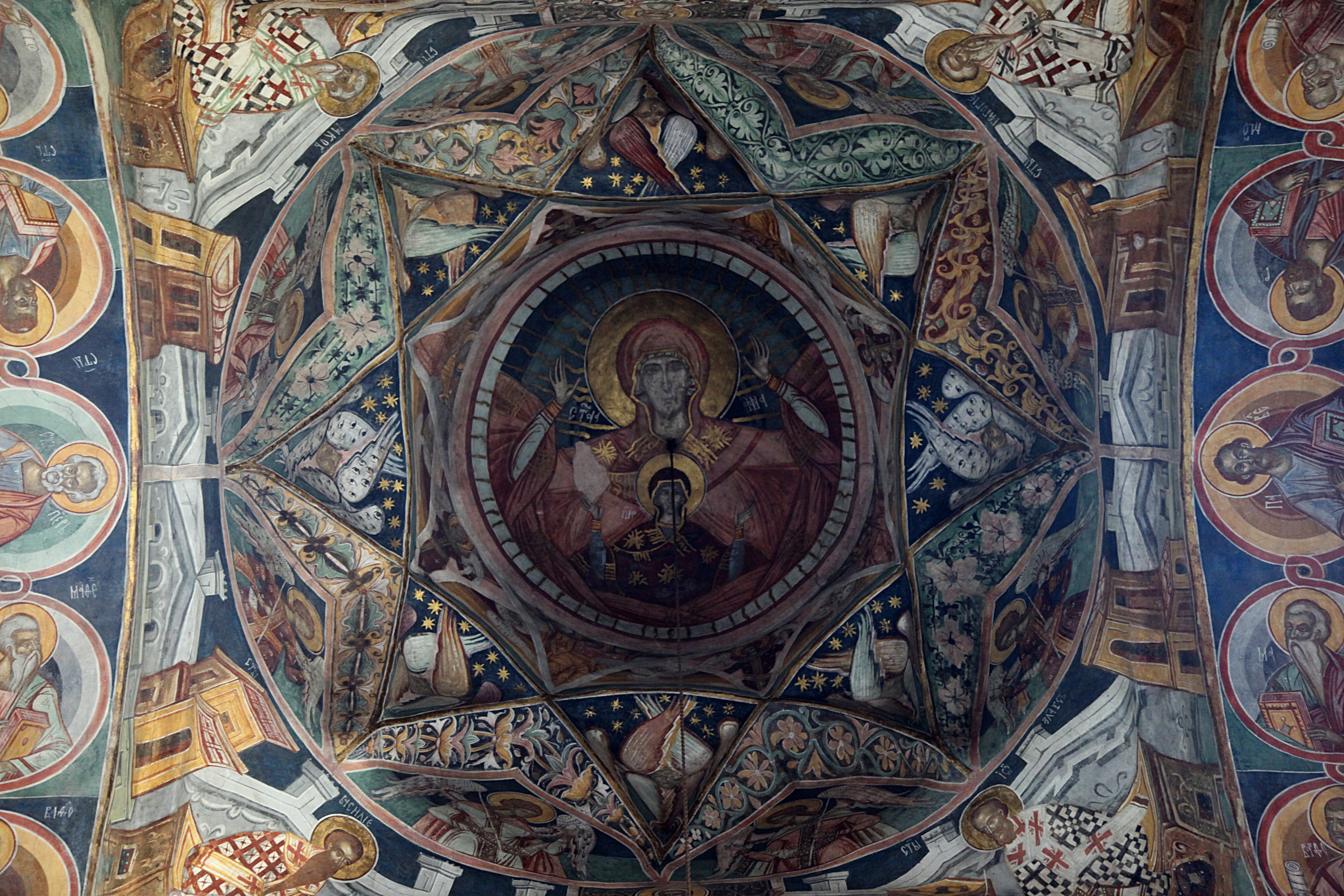
The interior Church of St. Nicholas in the Probota Monastery, view of the Moldavian vault, 16th century, Probota, Romania

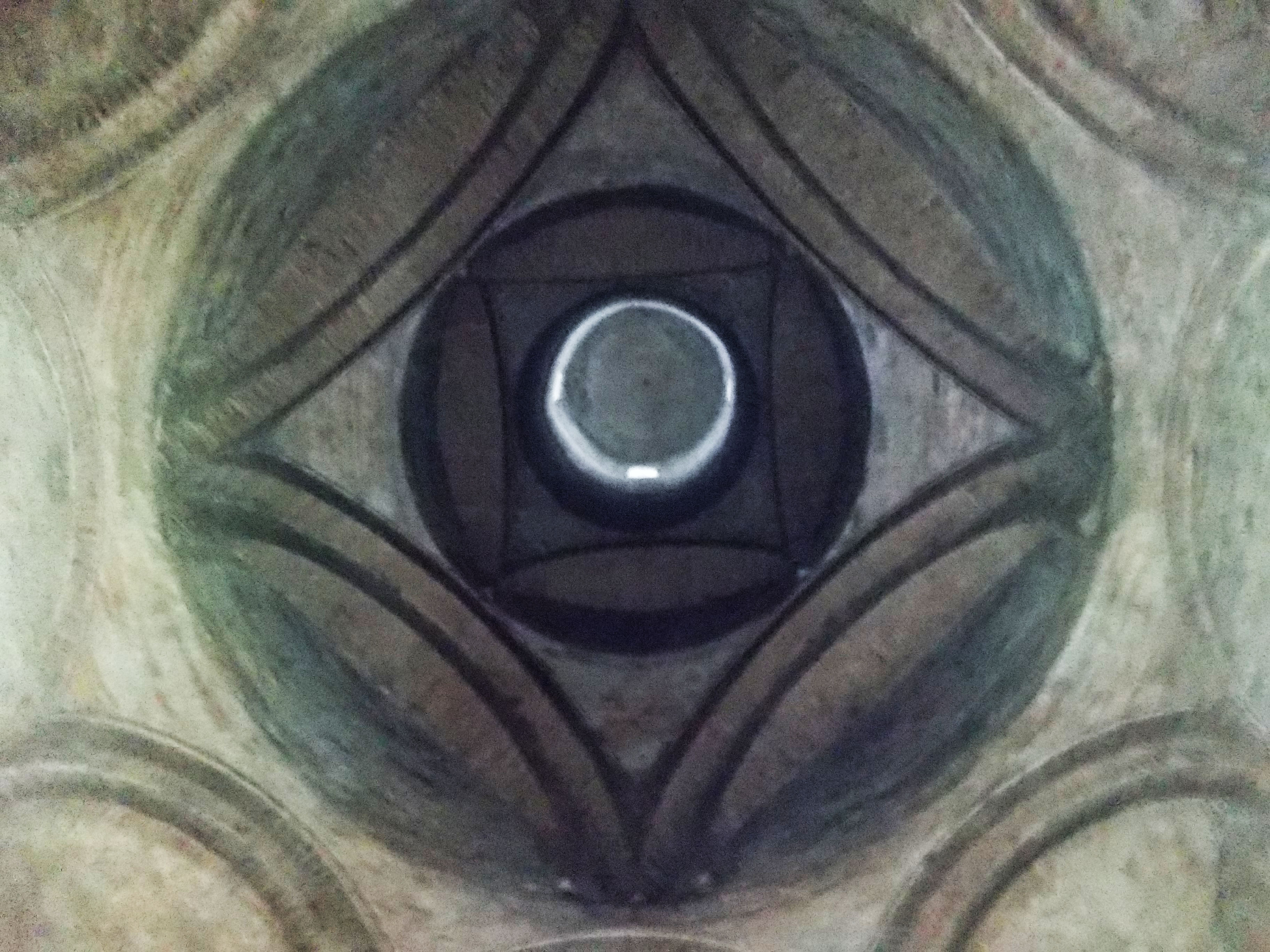
The interior Church in the Galata Monastery, view of the Moldavian vault, 16th century, Iași, Romania

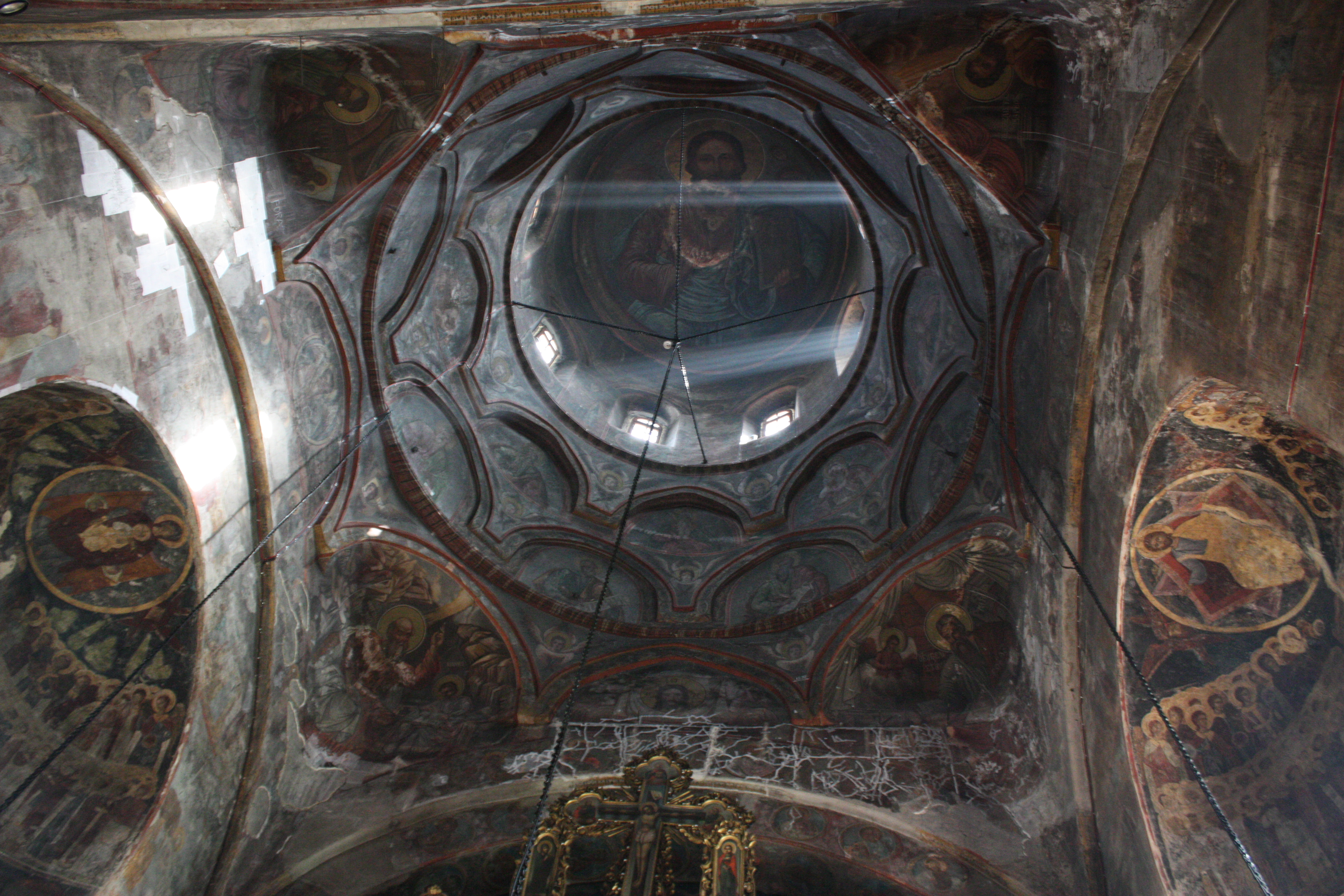
The interior of the Church of the Ascension in the Golia Monastery, view of the Moldavian vault, 17th century, Iași, Romania

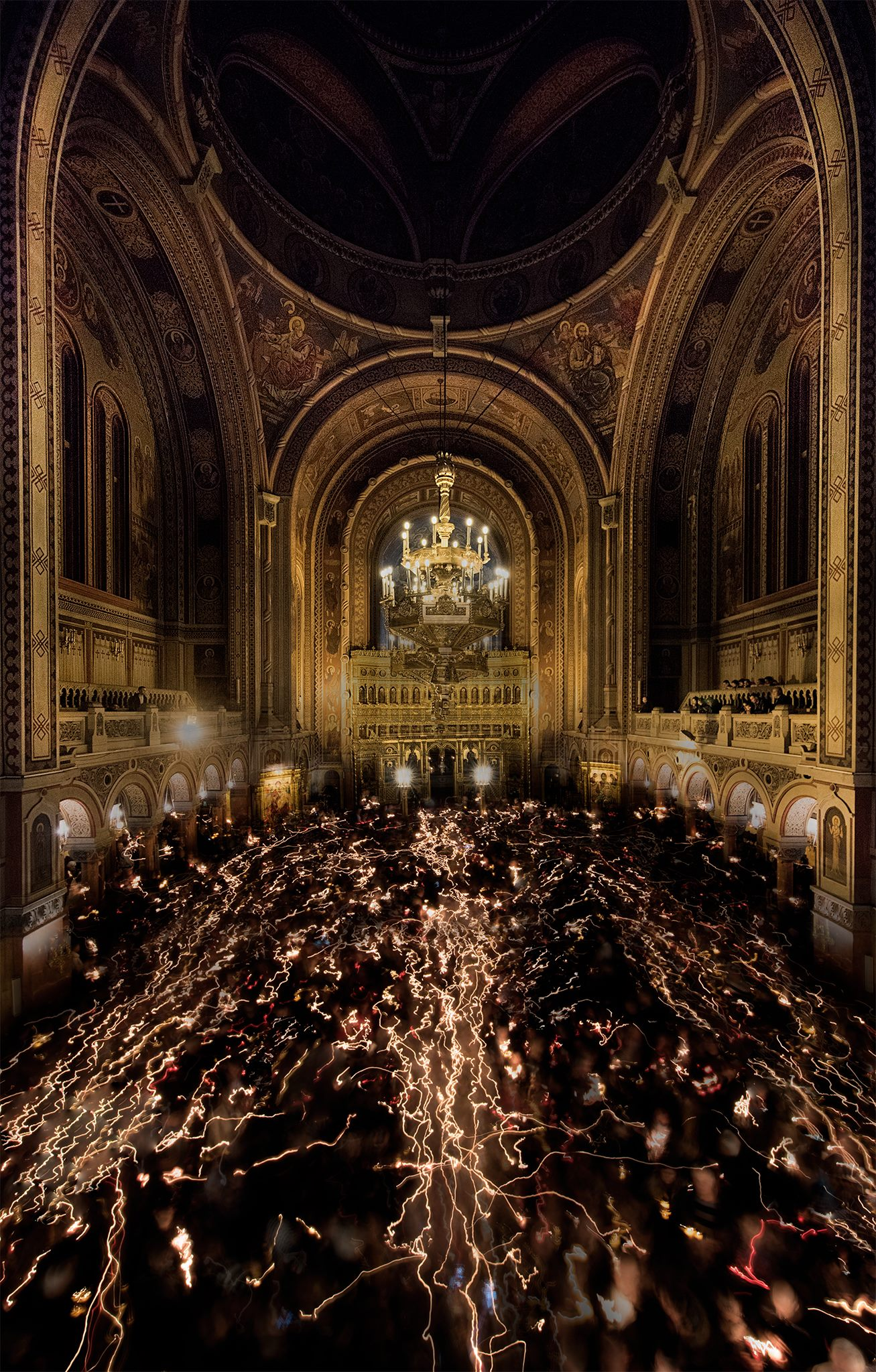
The interior of the Timișoara Orthodox Cathedral, view of the Moldavian vault, 20th century, Timișoara, Romania

== See also ==
- Churches of Moldavia
