= Diocese of Moldovița =

Former Roman Catholic diocese in Romania

The Diocese of Moldovița was a relatively short-lived (i.e. 1418–1550) Latin bishopric centred in Moldovița in the Bukovina region of present-day northeastern Romania (more specifically in Suceava County).

== History ==
In 1418, a Latin Diocese of Moldovita / Moldawitza / Suczawa [i.e. Suceava in Polish] / Moldavien(sis) (Latin adjective) was established in the Principality of Moldavia.

In 1550, it was suppressed, without direct successor.

Recorded incumbents were as follows:

(all Roman Rite)

probably incomplete
Suffragan? Bishops of Moldovita

- Pierre de Insula (1476.03.29–death 1484)
- Simon Dobriozanus (1484.11.14–death 1497)

== See also ==
- List of Catholic dioceses in Romania
- Orthodox Moldovița Monastery at Vatra Moldoviței
