= Deia =

Deia or DEIA may refer to:

== Places ==
- Deià, Mallorca, Spain
- Deia, Frumosu, Romania

== Other uses ==
- Deia (moth), an animal in Chile
- Deia (newspaper), in Basque and Spanish
- Deia River, the name of two rivers in Romania
- Deia Schlosberg, American documentary filmmaker
- Diversity, equity, inclusion and access, an American organizational framework
- Deia, a character from the Philippine fantasy drama series Encantadia Chronicles: Sang'gre
