= Pârâul Boului (Moldovița) =

- Location within Romania

Location
- Country: Romania
- Counties: Suceava County
- Villages: Paltinu

Physical characteristics
- Mouth: Moldovița
  - location: Vatra Moldoviței
  - coordinates: 47.6450°N 25.5785°E
- Length: 12 km (7.5 mi)
- Basin size: 50 km^{2} (19 sq mi)

Basin features
- Progression: Moldovița→ Moldova→ Siret→ Danube→ Black Sea
- Tributaries
  - right: Boul Mic, Trif

The Pârâul Boului is a right tributary of the river Moldovița in Romania. It flows into the Moldovița in Vatra Moldoviței. Its length is 12 km (7.5 mi) and its basin size is 50 km^{2} (19 sq mi).
