= Ciumarna =

Ciumarna may refer to several places in Romania:

- Ciumărna, a village in Românași Commune, Sălaj County
- Ciumârna, a village in Vatra Moldoviței Commune, Suceava County
