= Argel (river) =

- Location within Romania

Location
- Country: Romania
- Counties: Suceava County
- Villages: Argel

Physical characteristics
- Mouth: Moldovița
  - location: Argel
  - coordinates: 47.7595°N 25.4353°E
- Length: 13 km (8.1 mi)
- Basin size: 46 km^{2} (18 sq mi)

Basin features
- Progression: Moldovița→ Moldova→ Siret→ Danube→ Black Sea
- Tributaries
  - right: Porcescu, Turculețu

The Argel (in its upper course also: Rădvanu) is a right tributary of the river Moldovița in Romania. It flows into the Moldovița in the village Argel. Its length is 13 km (8.1 mi), and its basin size is 46 km^{2} (18 sq mi).
