= Deia River =

Deia River may refer to the following rivers in Romania

- Deia River - tributary of the Moldova River
- Deia River - tributary of the Moldovița River
