= Moldovița (river) =

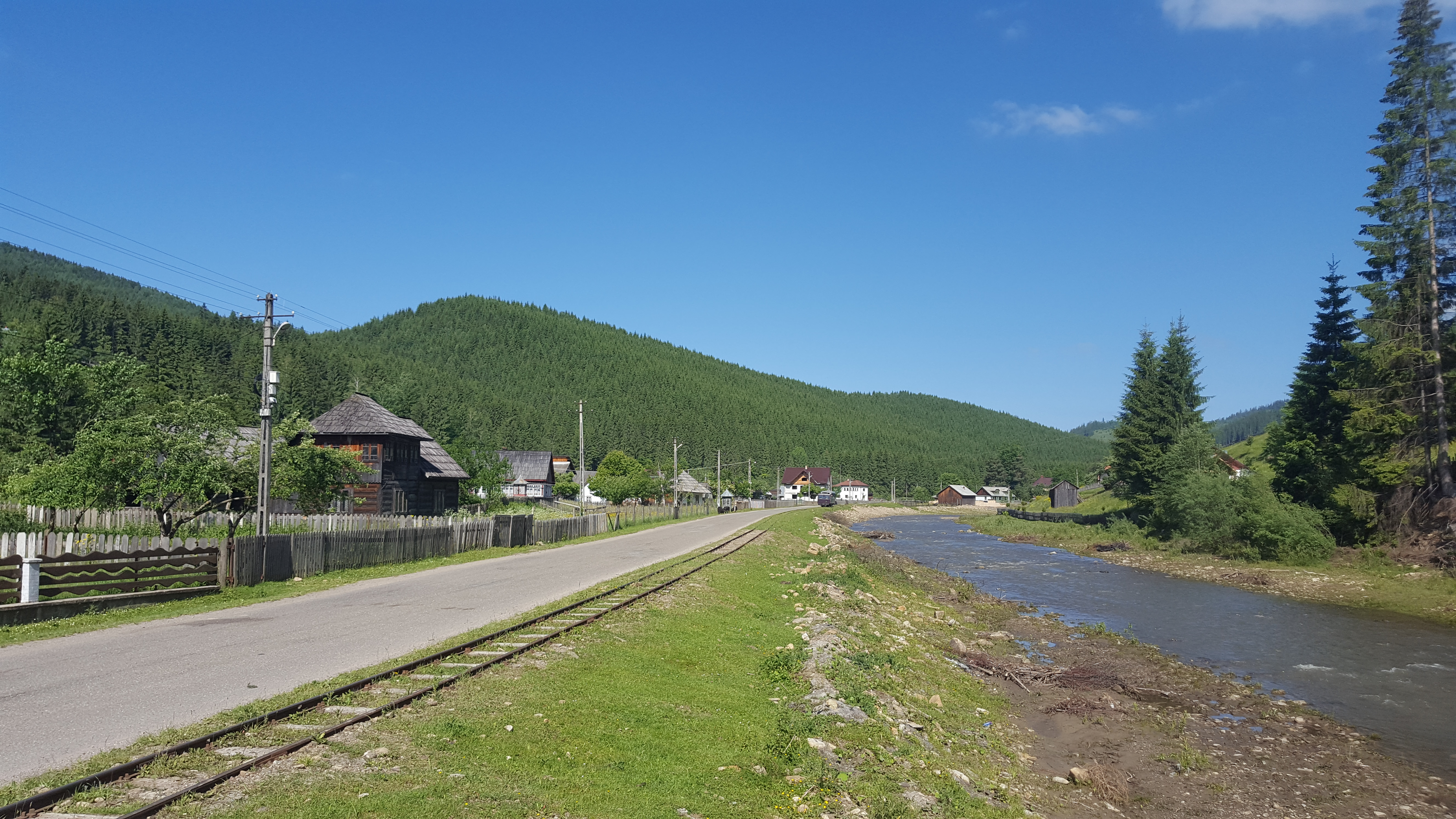
- The Moldovița passing through Argel

- Location within Romania

Location
- Country: Romania
- Counties: Suceava County

Physical characteristics
- Mouth: Moldova
  - location: Vama
  - coordinates: 47.5696°N 25.7049°E
- Length: 48 km (30 mi)
- Basin size: 549 km^{2} (212 sq mi)

Basin features
- Progression: Moldova→ Siret→ Danube→ Black Sea

The Moldovița (in its upper course also: Roșoșa) is a left tributary of the river Moldova in Romania. It discharges into the Moldova in Vama. It flows through the villages Argel, Rașca, Moldovița, Vatra Moldoviței, Frumosu, Strâmtura and Vama. Its length is 48 km (30 mi) and its basin size is 549 km^{2} (212 sq mi).

== Tributaries ==
The following rivers are tributaries to the river Moldovița:

- Left: Dubu, Rașcova (Rașca), Săcrieș, Ciumârna, Lupoaia, Dragoșa, Frumosul
- Right: Argel, Lunguleț, Demăcușa, Vulcan, Pârâul Boului, Deia
