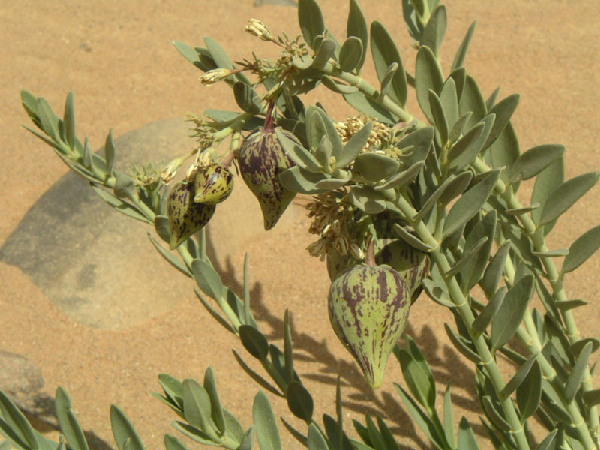
- Solenostemma argel

Scientific classification
- Kingdom: Plantae
- Clade: Tracheophytes
- Clade: Angiosperms
- Clade: Eudicots
- Clade: Asterids
- Order: Gentianales
- Family: Apocynaceae
- Genus: Solenostemma; Hayne
- Species: S. arghel

Binomial name
- Solenostemma arghel (Delile) Hayne

Synonyms
- Of the genus: Argelia Decne.; Of the species: Argelia delilei Decne., nom. superfl.; Cynanchum arghel Delile

= Solenostemma =

Genus of plants

Solenostemma is a genus of plants in the family Apocynaceae, It was established as a genus in 1825. It contains only one known species, Solenostemma arghel, native to North Africa and the Arabian Peninsula.

The leaves are used in herbal medicine for the treatment of some diseases such as of liver and kidney and allergies. It is used to treat neuralgia and sciatica. It is used as incense in the treatment of measles and sometimes crushed and used as remedy for suppurating wounds. The leaves are infused to treat gastro-intestinal cramps, stomach-ache, colic, cold and urinary tract infections. Leaves possess purgative properties which may be due to the latex present in the stems. Several active compounds have been extracted from Solenostemma. The native Sudanese have commonly used Solenostemma arghel to suppress stomach pain, pains due to childbirth, and loss of appetite.

The word is used in the book called "أرض السودان" written by Amîr Tâdj as sirr. The Arabic word is حرجل.

Formerly included species moved to Cynanchum:

- Solenostemma acutum (L.) Wehmer, synonym of Cynanchum acutum L.
- Solenostemma oleifolium (Neck.) Bullock & E.A.Bruce, synonym of Cynanchum oleifolium Nectoux
