= Moldovița =

- Commune
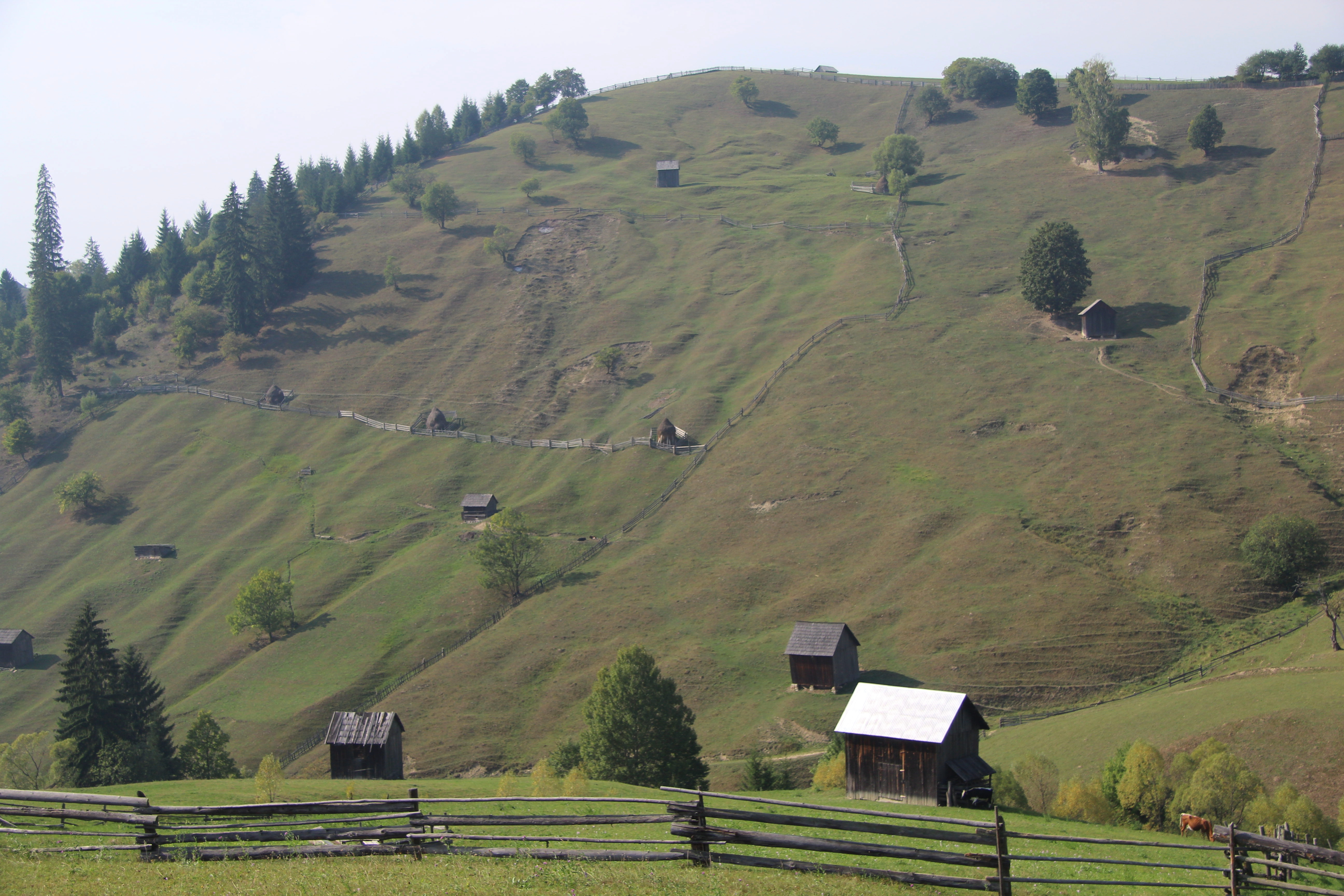
- Rural landscape in Moldovița

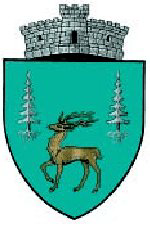
- Coat of arms

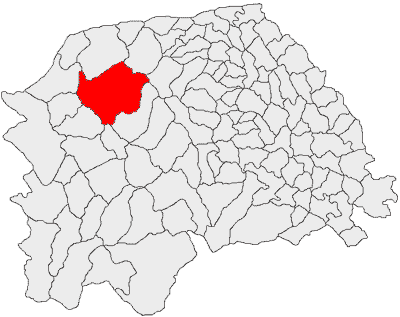
- Location in Suceava County

- Location in Romania
- Coordinates: 47°41′N 25°33′E
- Country: Romania
- County: Suceava
- Subdivisions: Moldovița, Argel, Demăcușa, Rașca

Government
  - Mayor (2024–2028): Alin Boșutar (PSD)
- Area: 249.24 km^{2} (96.23 sq mi)
- Elevation: 676 m (2,218 ft)
- Population (2021-12-01): 4,883
  - Density: 19.59/km^{2} (50.74/sq mi)
- Time zone: UTC+02:00 (EET)
  - Summer (DST): UTC+03:00 (EEST)
- Postal code: 727385
- Area code: (+40) x30
- Vehicle reg.: SV
- Website: primariamoldovita.ro

Moldovița is a commune located in Suceava County, Bukovina, northeastern Romania. It is composed of four villages, namely: Argel (German: Ardzel), Demăcușa, Moldovița (German: Russ Moldawitza, Polish: Mołdawica Ruska), and Rașca.

A Latin-rite Catholic Diocese of Moldovița existed here from 1418 to 1550.

== Demographics ==
According to the 2002 Romanian census, there were 5,021 people living in the commune. The national composition thereof was:

	Ethnicity in Moldovița (1930–2002)							
Year	Romanians	Ukrainians	Russians	Germans (Bukovina Germans) (Note: Eventually also Zipser Germans included in this figure as well.)	Poles	Slovaks	Turks	Jews
1930	17.27%	52.97%	1.27%	11.15%	3.45%	-	-	13.54%
2002	4763 (94.9%)	209 (4.2%)	-	37 (0.7%)	5 (0.1%)	4 (0.1%)	1 (< 0.1%)	1 (< 0.1%)

As for language, in 2002 the composition was:

	Language in Moldovița (2002)			
Year	Romanian	Ukrainian	German	Hungarian
2002	4,839 (96.4%)	167 (3.3%)	12 (0.2%)	1 (< 0.1%)

== Administration and local politics ==
=== Communal council ===
The commune's current local council has the following political composition, according to the results of the 2020 Romanian local elections:

Party	Seats	Current Council
National Liberal Party (PNL)	8	
Alliance for the Union of Romanians (AUR)	3	
PRO Romania (PRO)	2	
Social Democratic Party (PSD)	1	
People's Movement Party (PMP)	1	

== Gallery ==
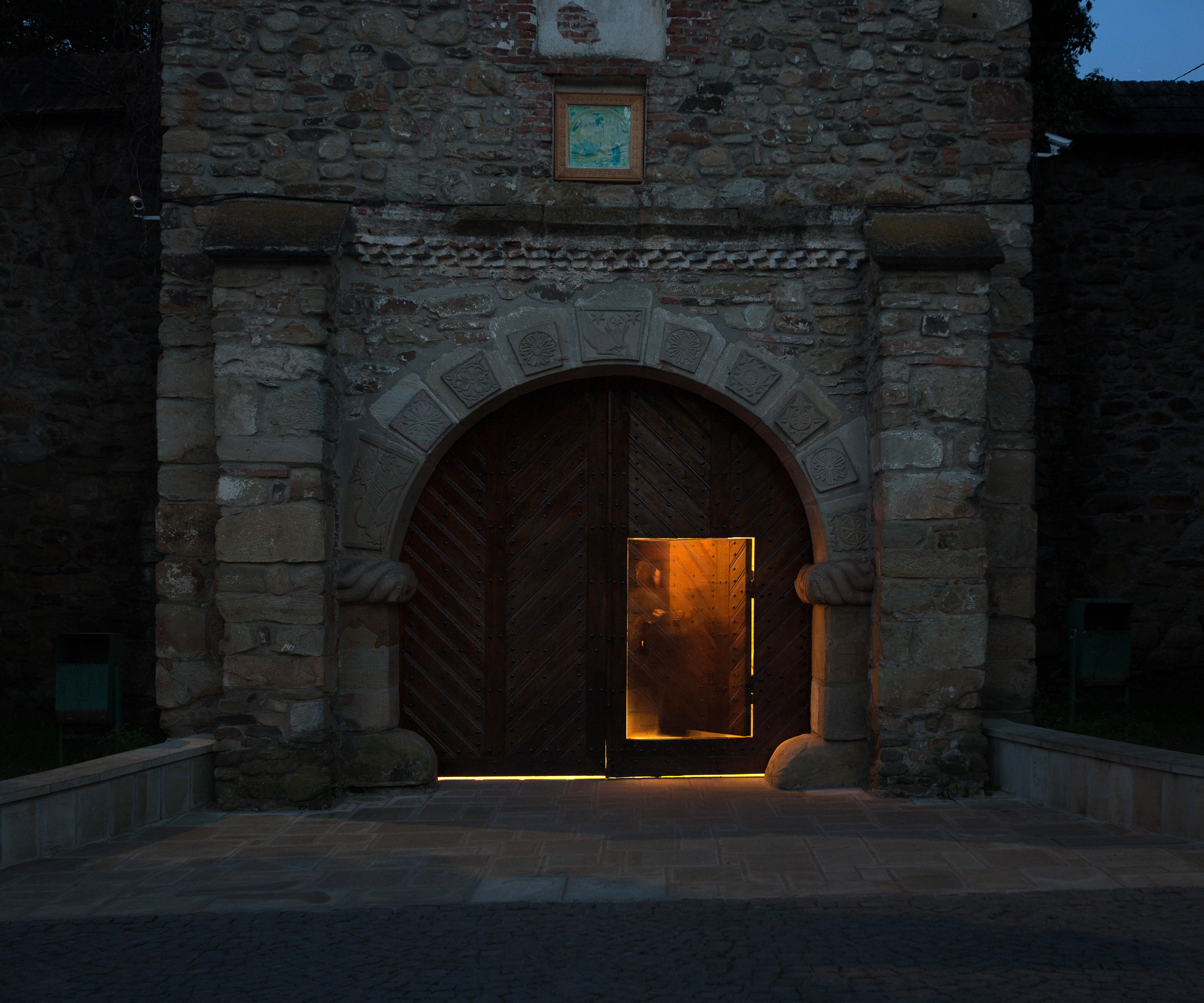
Moldovița Monastery photographed by Oliver Mark in 2018

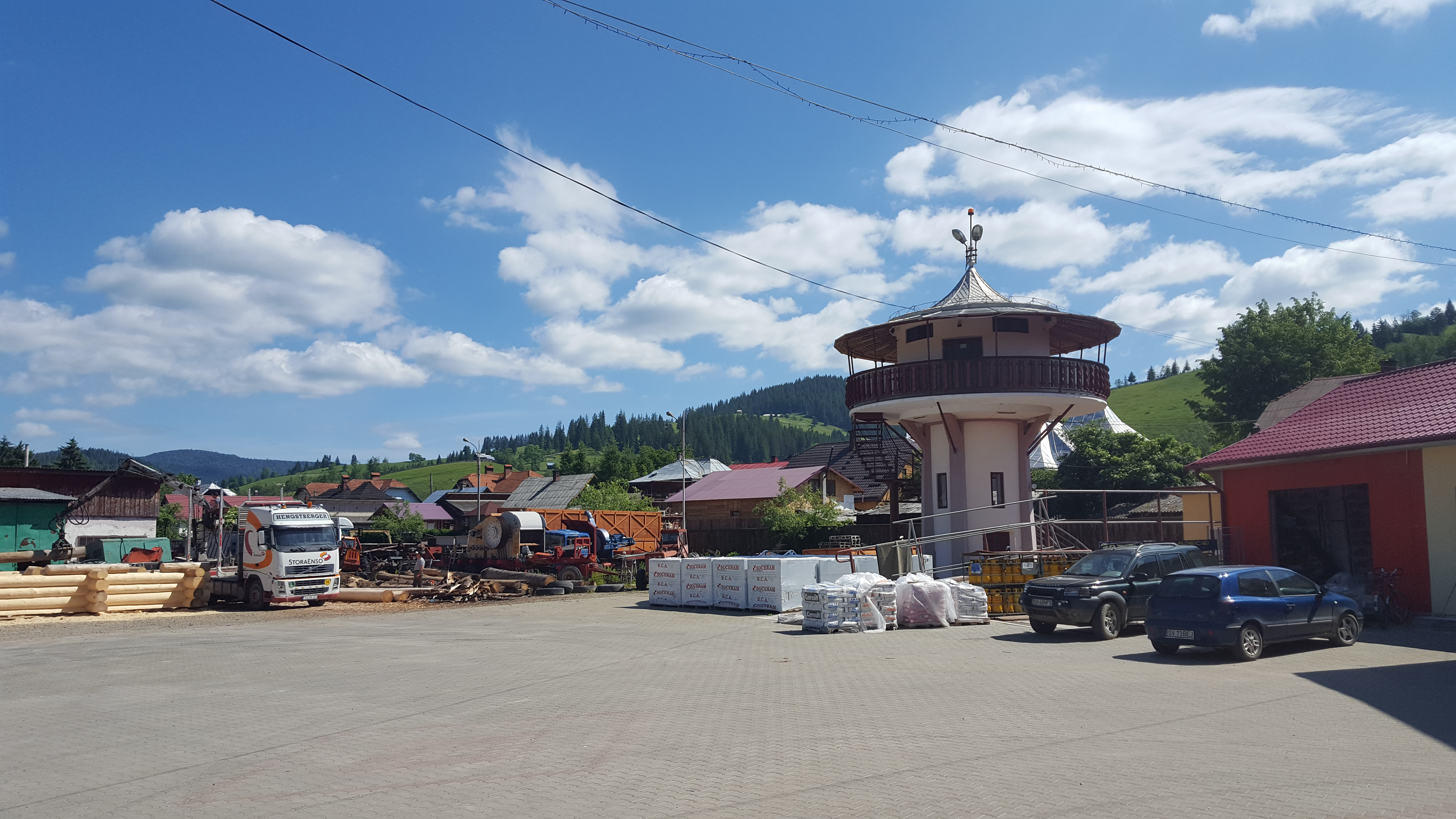
The renovated water tower of Moldovița

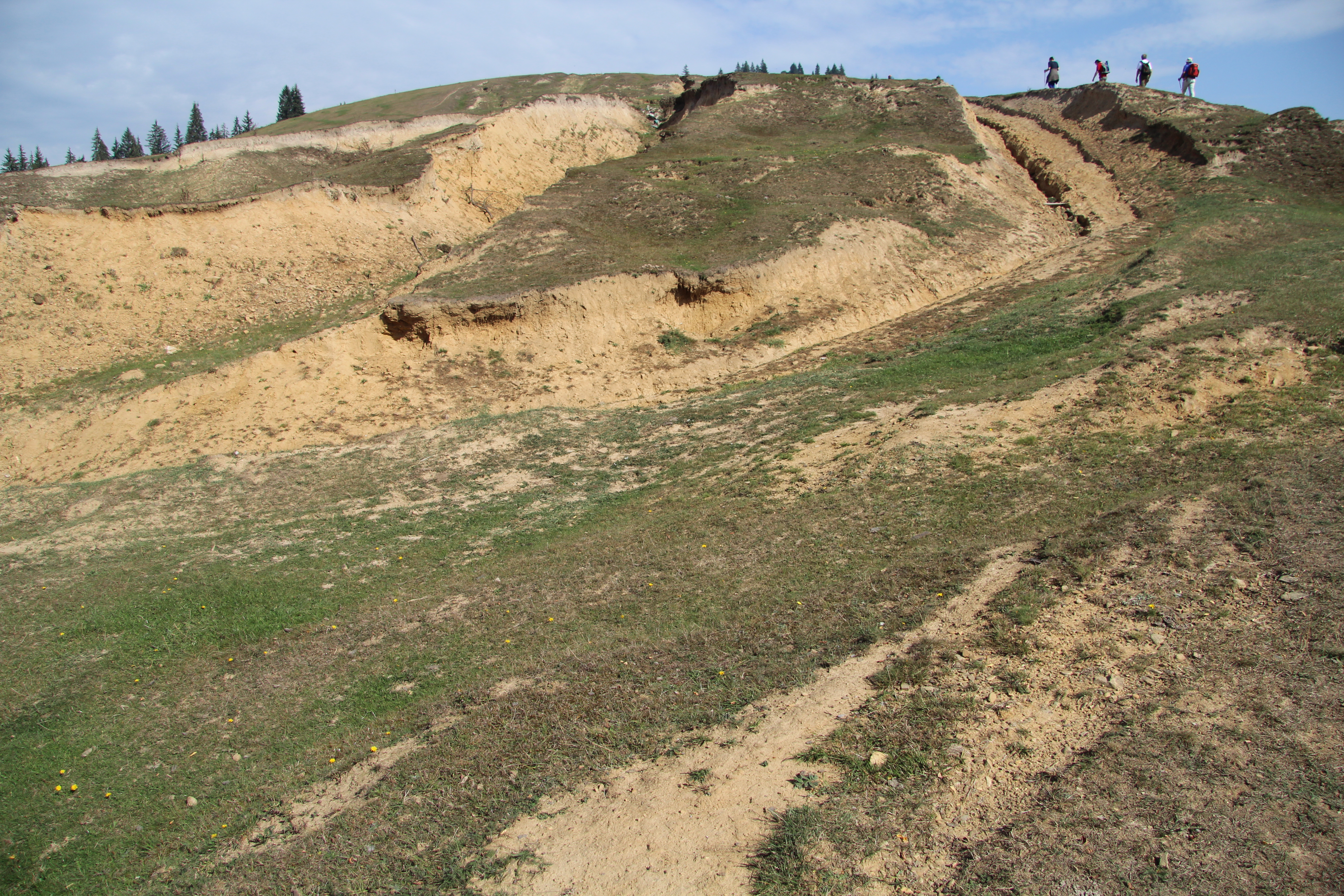
Erosion in Moldovița

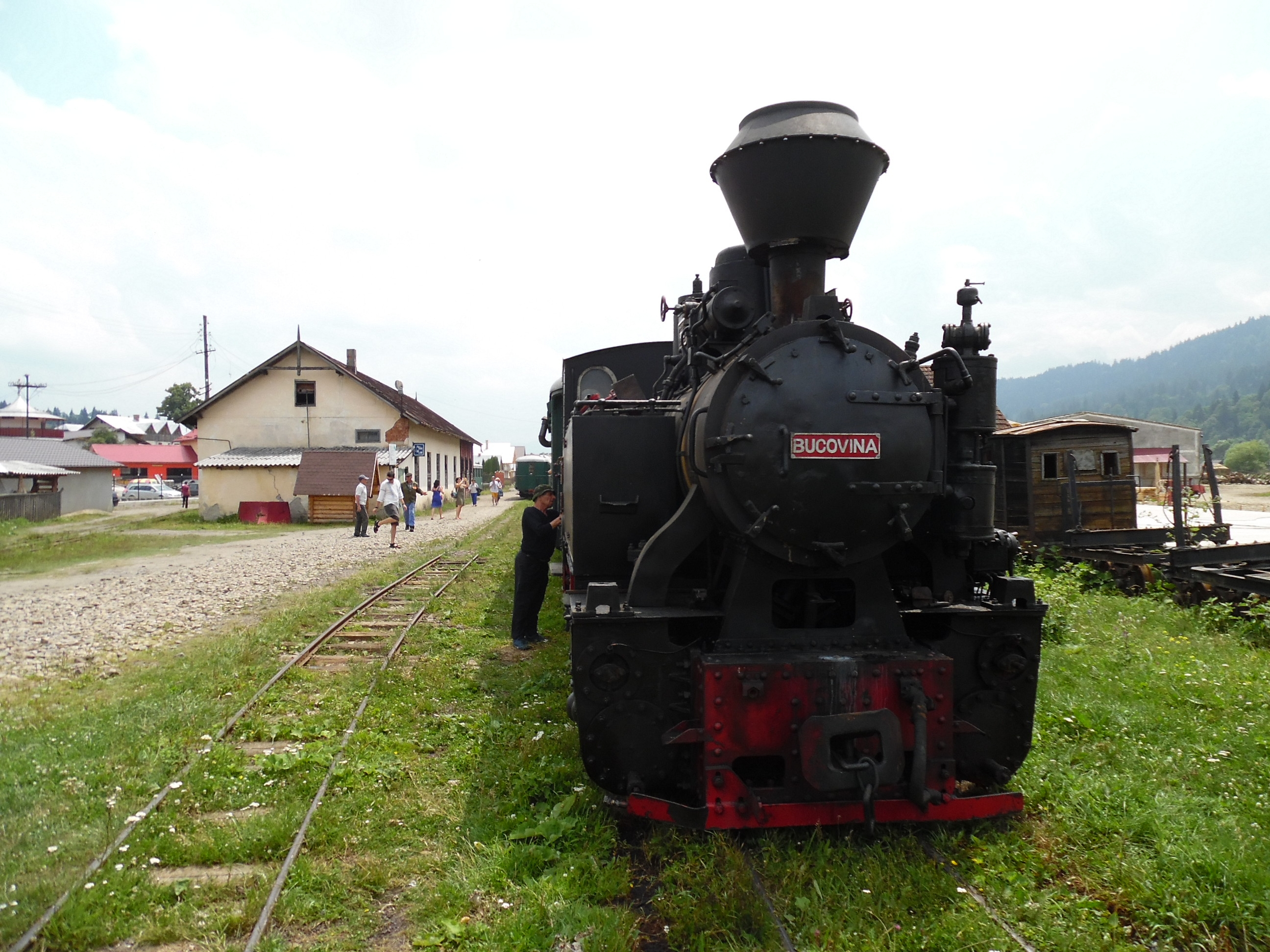
Mocănița-Huțulca-Moldovița narrow-gauge steam locomotive in Moldovița commune, a popular touristic attraction of Suceava County

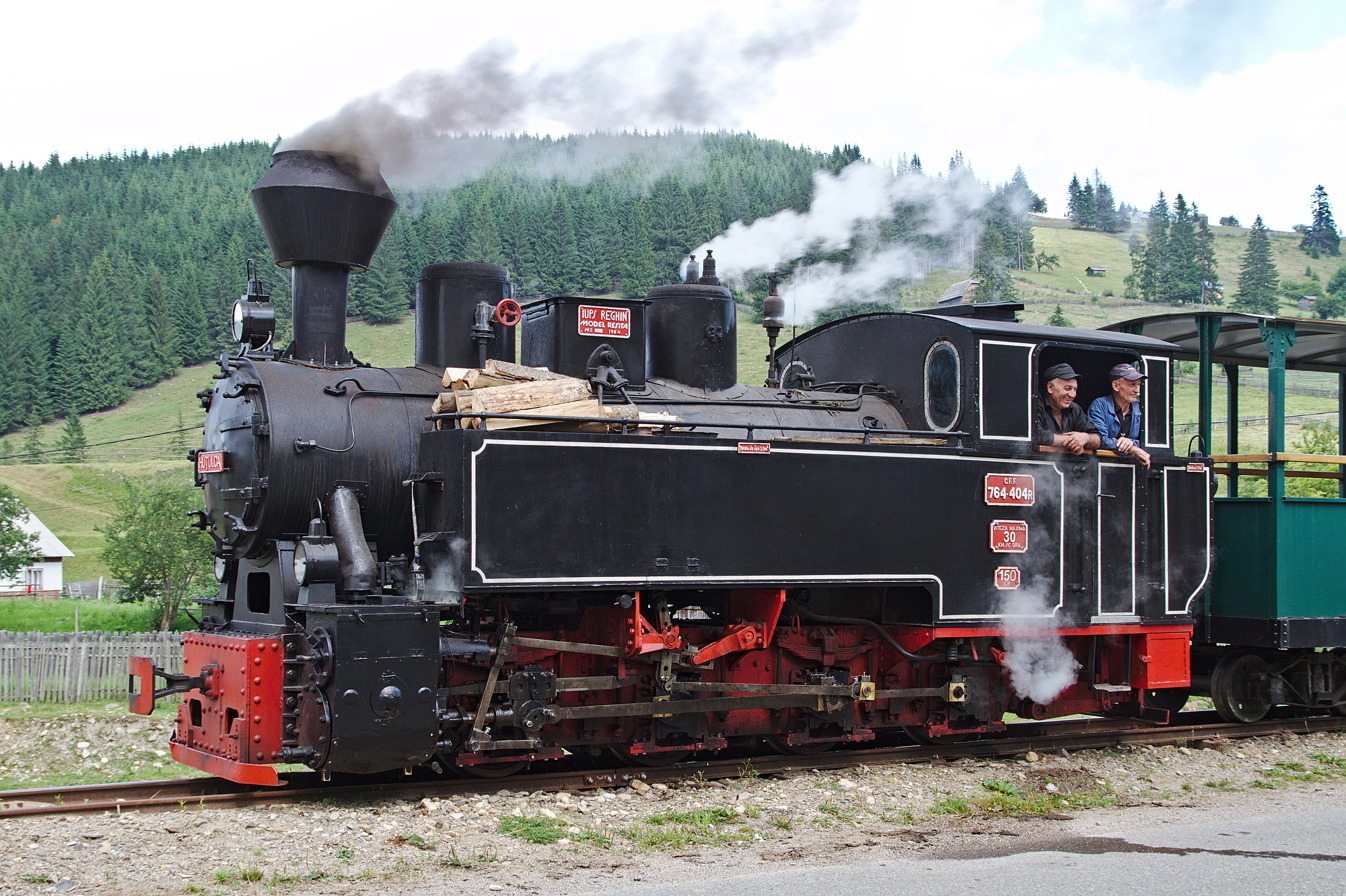
Mocănița-Huțulca-Moldovița narrow-gauge steam locomotive in Moldovița commune, a popular touristic attraction of Suceava County

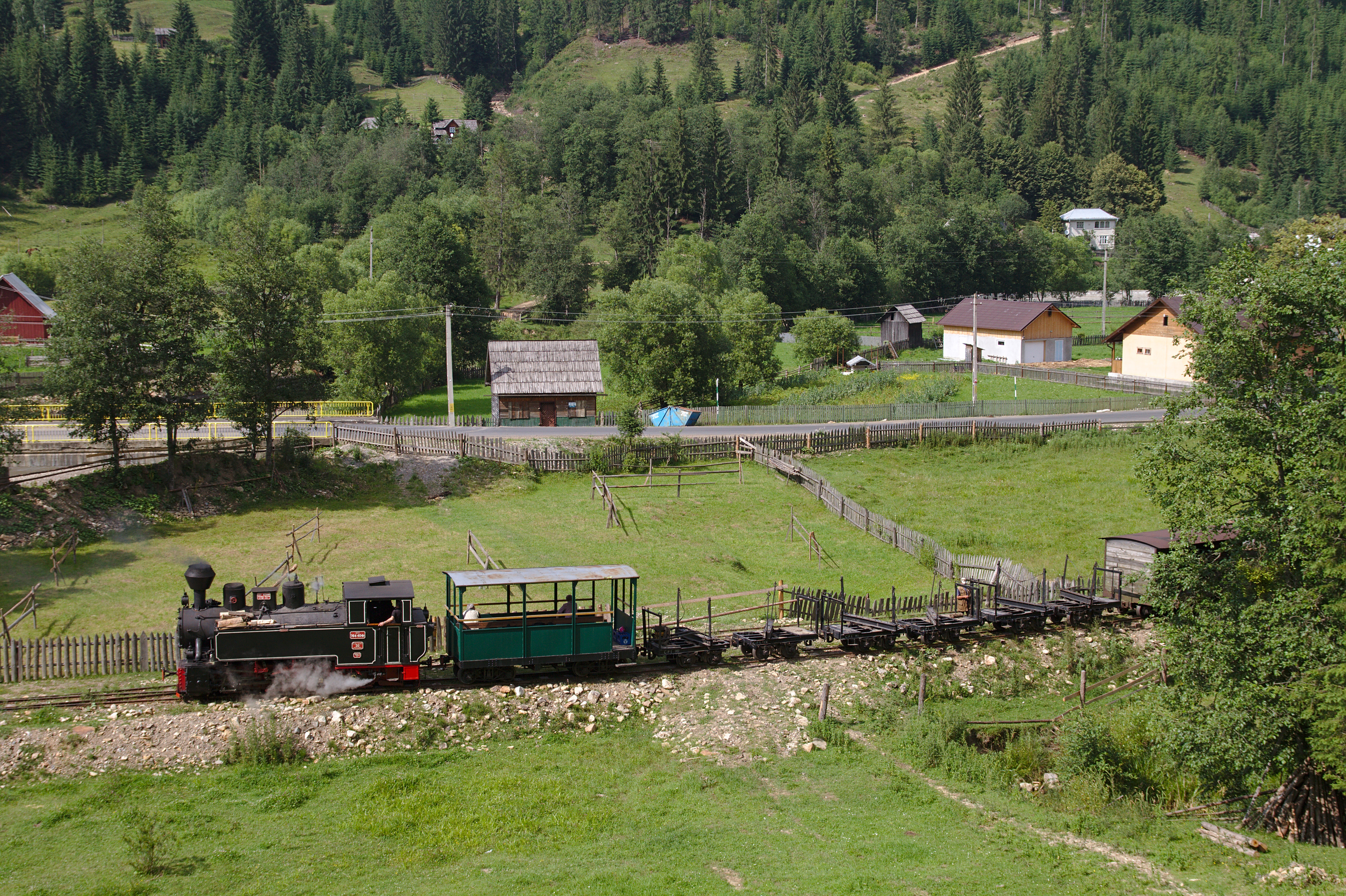
Mocănița-Huțulca-Moldovița narrow-gauge steam train in Moldovița commune (July 2013), a popular touristic attraction of Suceava County

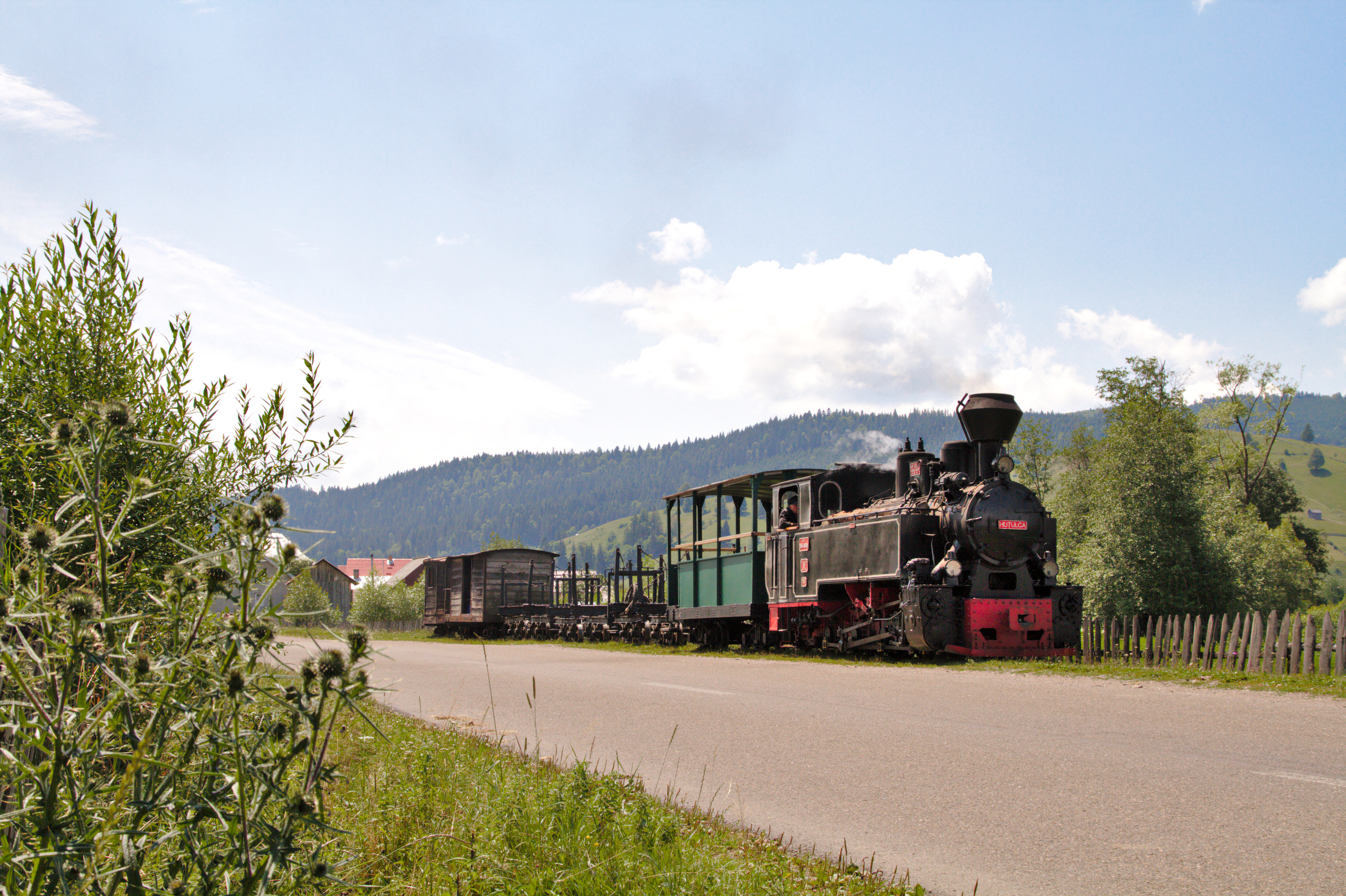
Mocănița-Huțulca-Moldovița narrow-gauge steam train in Moldovița commune (July 2013), a popular touristic attraction of Suceava County

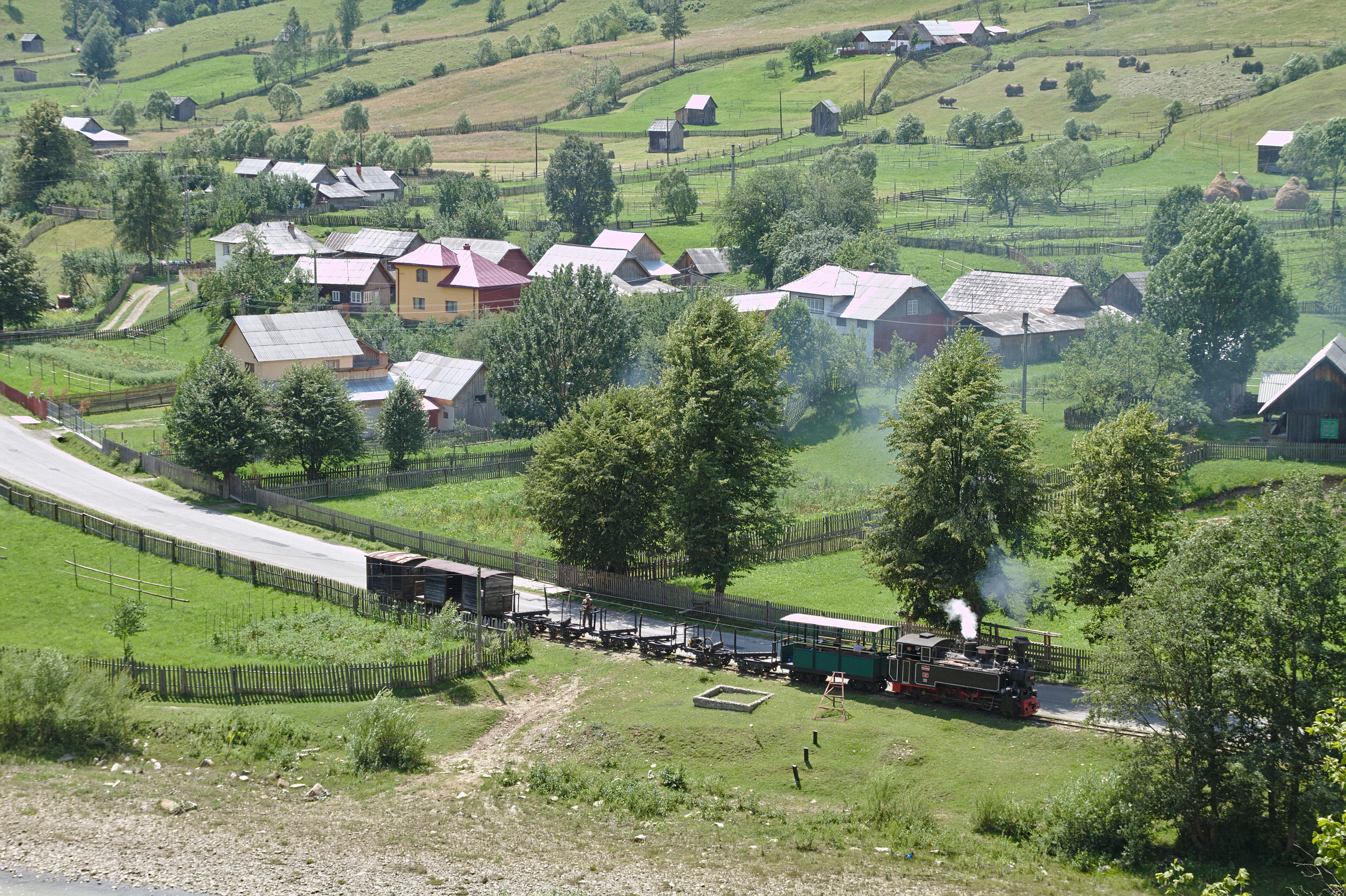
Mocănița-Huțulca-Moldovița narrow-gauge steam train in Moldovița commune (July 2013), a popular touristic attraction of Suceava County

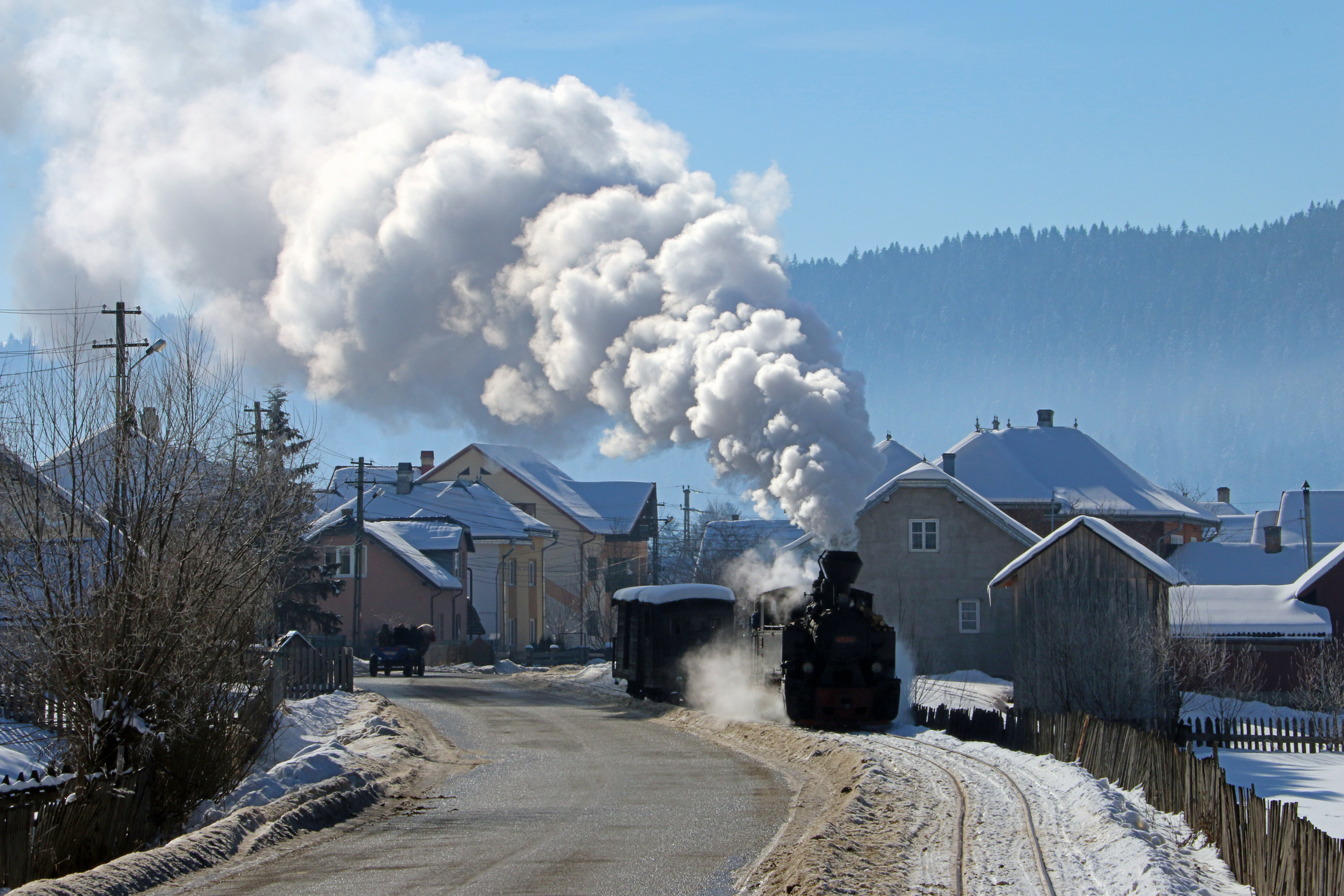
Mocănița-Huțulca-Moldovița narrow-gauge steam train in Moldovița commune (February 2014), a popular touristic attraction of Suceava County

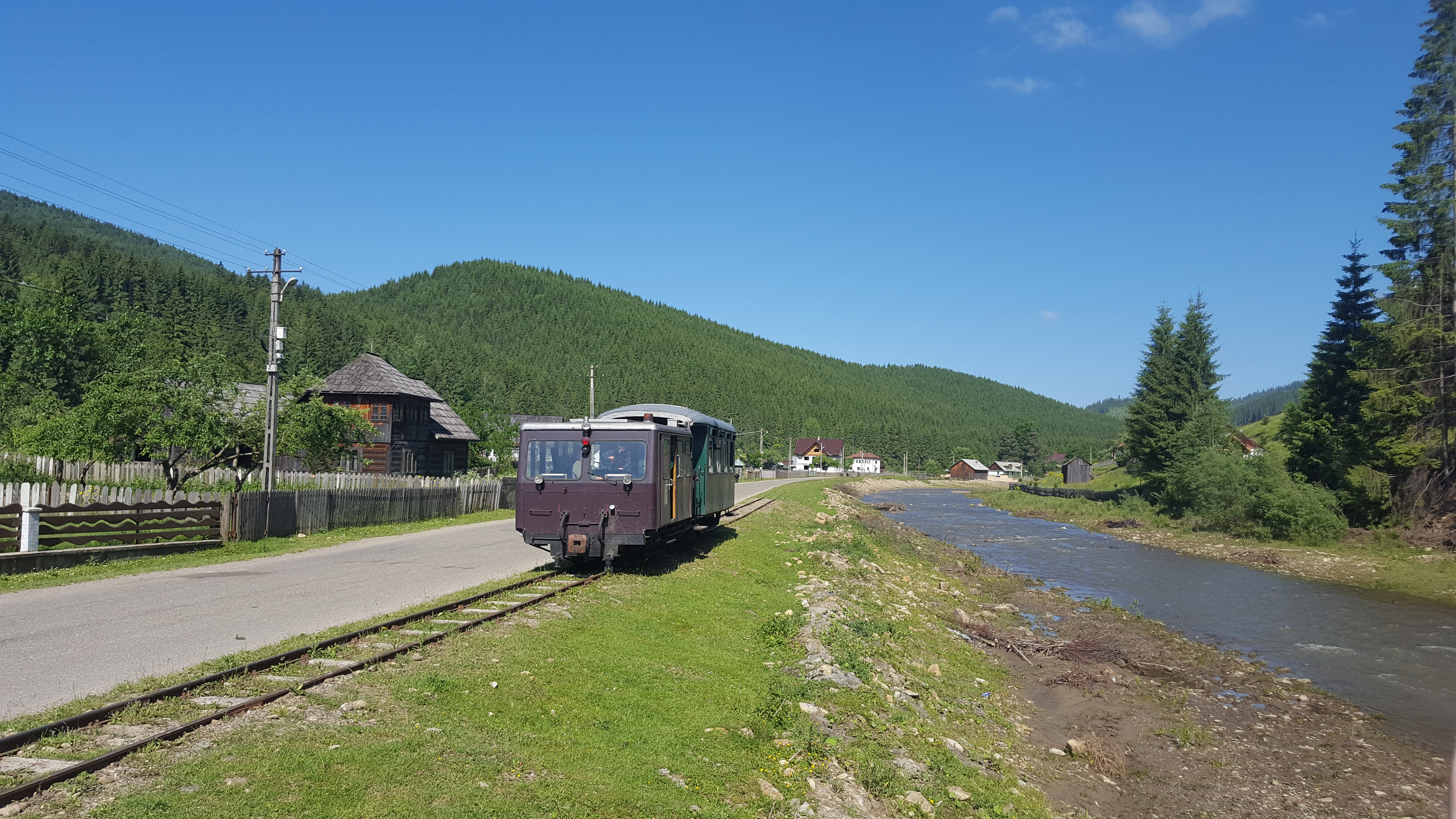
Mocănița tourist train in Argel

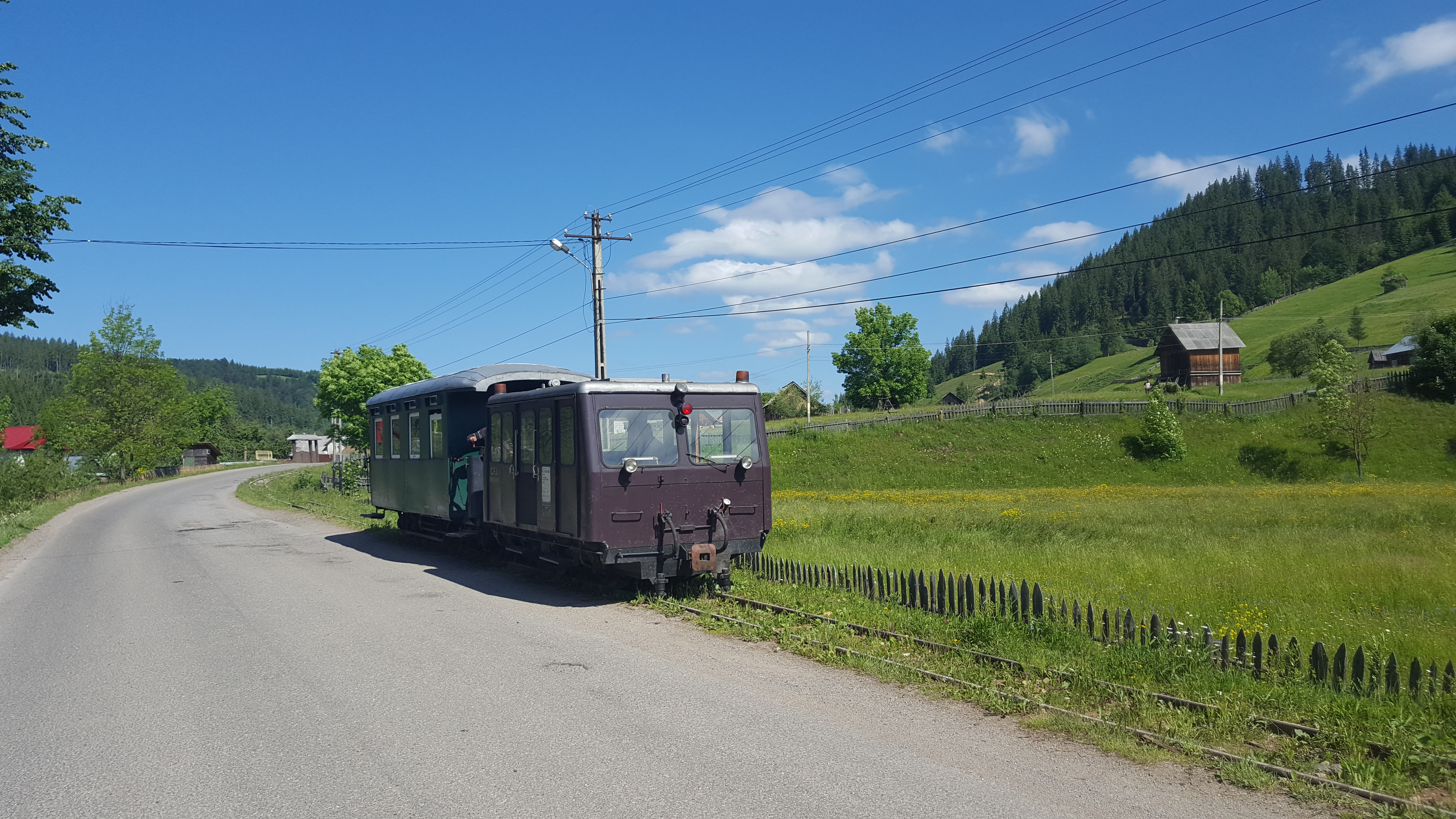
Mocănița tourist train in Argel

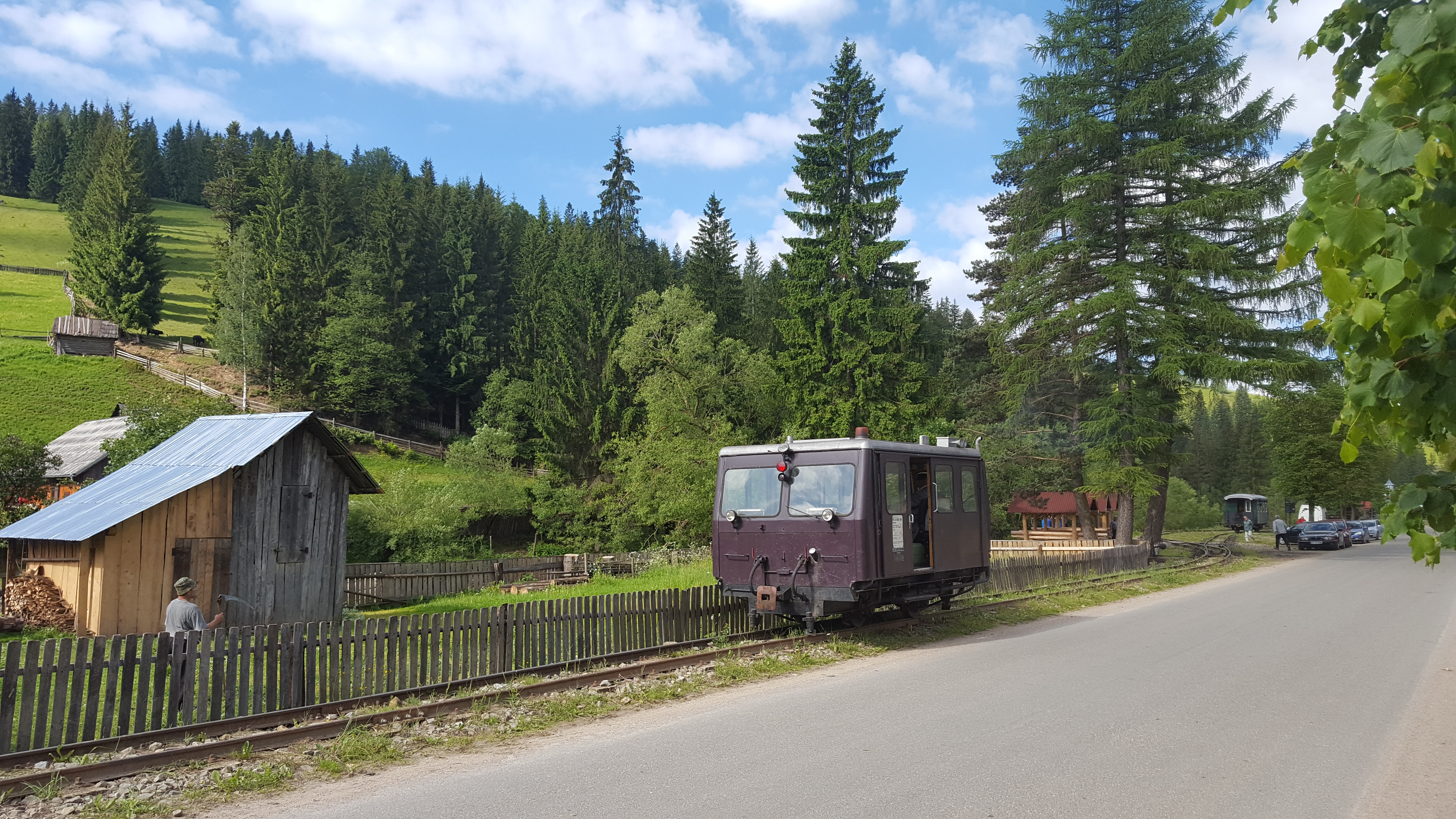
Mocănița tourist train in Argel

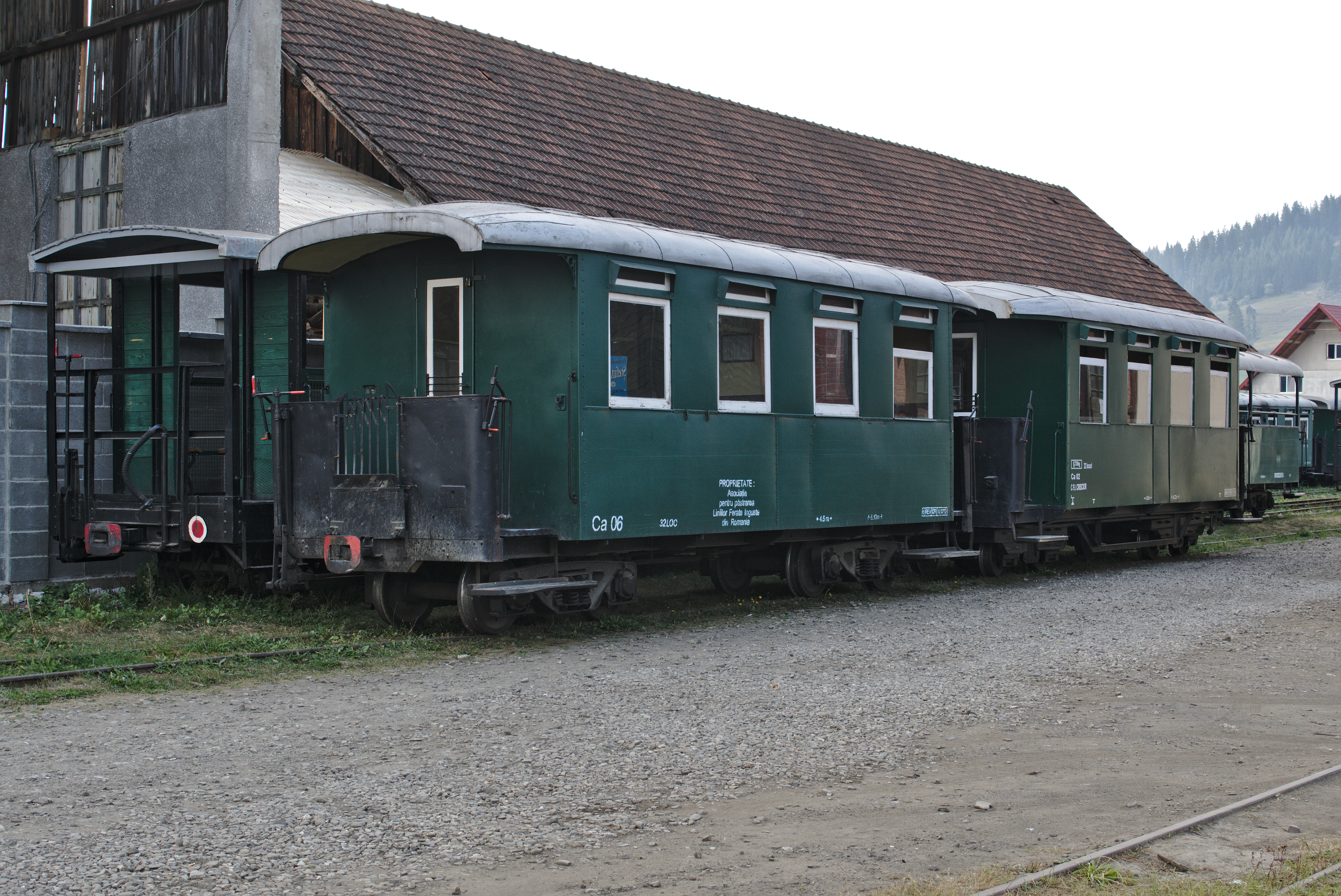
Mocănița tourist wagons in Moldovița
