= Moldovița Monastery =

Coordinates: 47°39′25″N 25°34′16″E

- Mănăstirea Moldovița
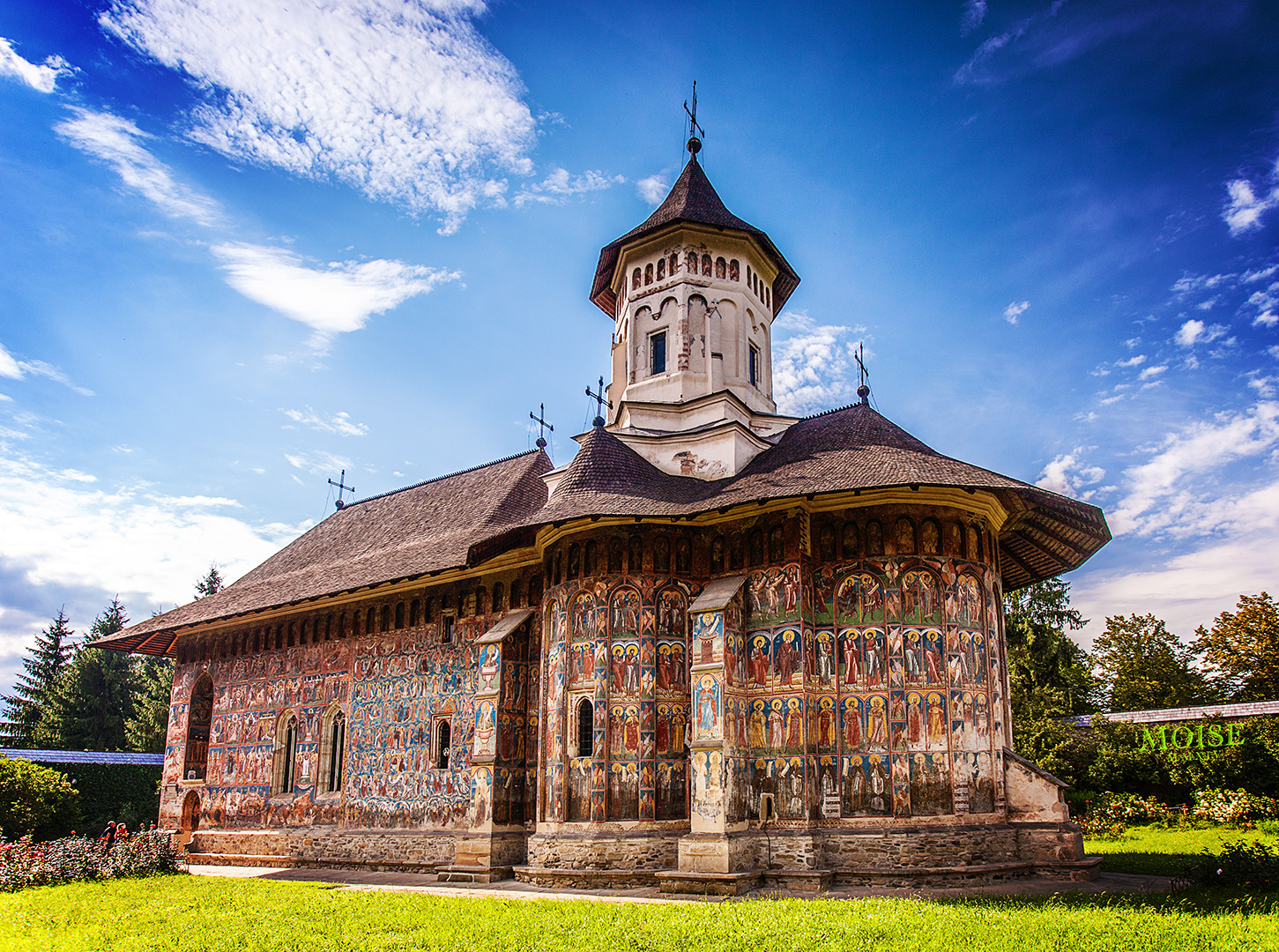

Religion
- Affiliation: Romanian Orthodox
- Ecclesiastical or organisational status: Nunnery
- Patron: Annunciation
- Status: Active

Location
- Location: Vatra Moldoviței, Suceava County, Romania
- Interactive map of Moldovița Monastery

Architecture
- Style: Byzantine, Gothic
- Founder: Petru Rareș
- Completed: 1532

UNESCO World Heritage Site
- Part of: Churches of Moldavia
- Criteria: Cultural: (i), (iv)
- Reference: 598
- Inscription: 1993 (17th Session)

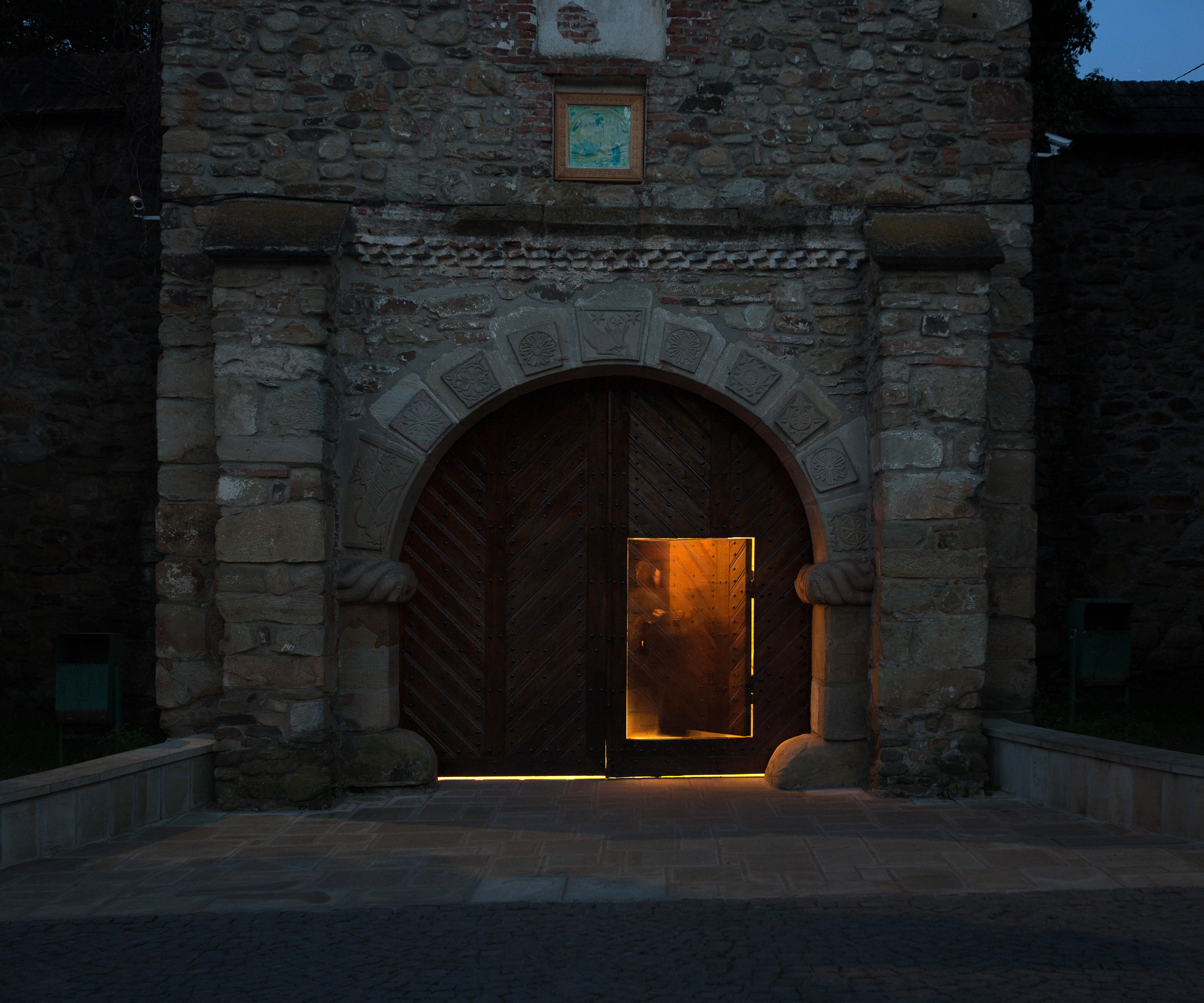
Front gate of the Moldovița Monastery photographed by Oliver Mark, collection of the Bukovina Museum, 2018

The Moldovița Monastery (Romanian: Mânăstirea Moldovița) is a Romanian Orthodox monastery situated in the commune of Vatra Moldoviței, Suceava County, Moldavia, Romania. The Monastery of Moldovița was built in 1532 by Petru Rareș, who was Stephen III of Moldavia's illegitimate son. It was founded as a protective barrier against the Muslim Ottoman conquerors from the East.

== History ==
Stephen the Great, the Prince (in Romanian Domnitor) of Moldavia from 1457 until his death in 1504, fought 36 battles against the Ottoman Empire, winning 34 of them. He was very religious and built churches after many victories. Stephen's illegitimate son, Petru Rareș, who ruled Moldavia from 1527 to 1538 and again from 1541 to 1546, promoted a new vision for Bukovina churches. He commissioned artists to cover the interiors and exteriors with elaborate frescoes (portraits of saints and prophets, scenes from the life of Jesus).

The best preserved are the monasteries in the towns of Sucevița, Moldovița, Voroneț, Humor, Suceava, Pătrăuți, Arbore and Probota. These eight monasteries—including the Monastery of Moldovița—were placed on UNESCO World Heritage list in 1993, as the Painted churches of Moldavia.

== Frescoes ==
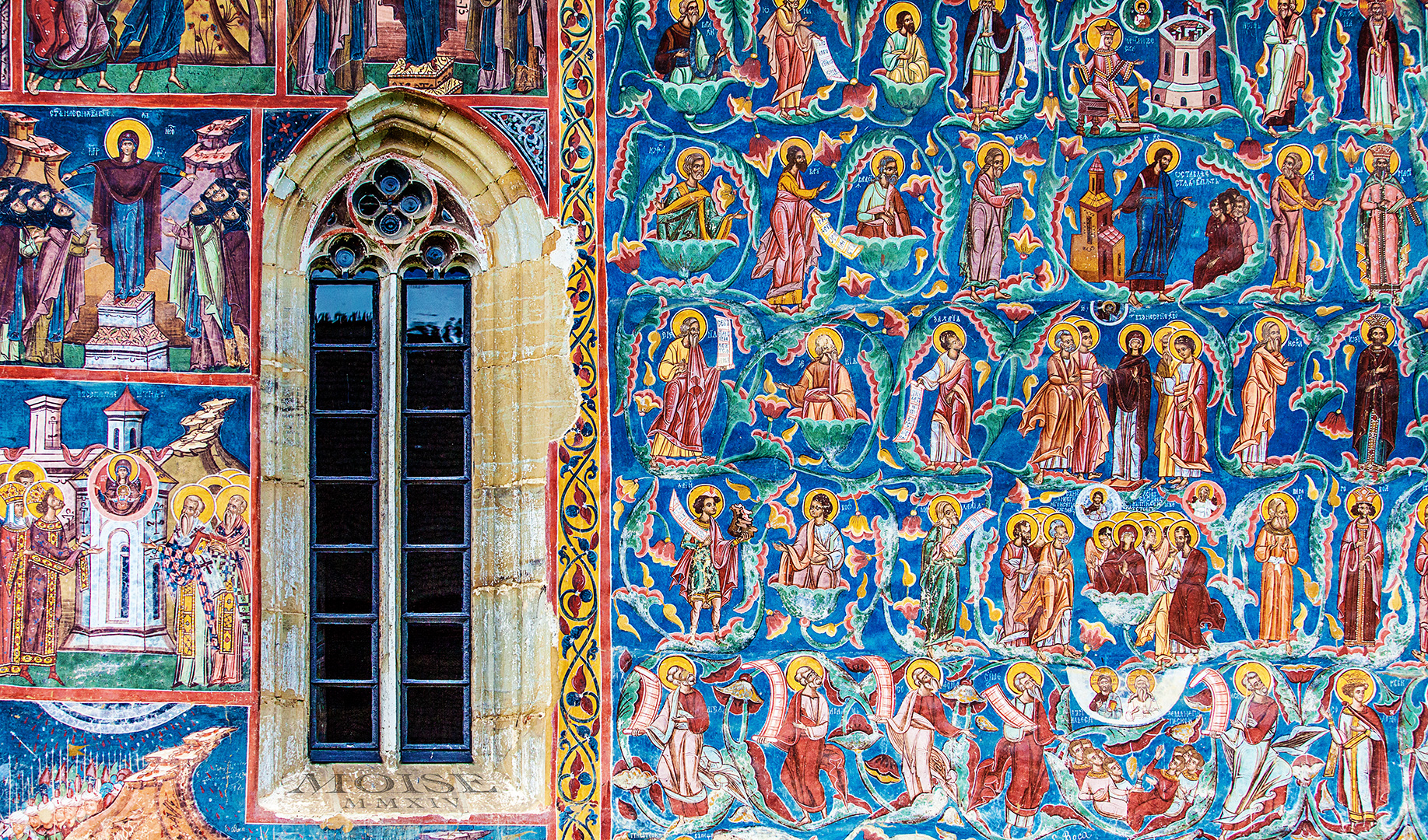
Frescoes

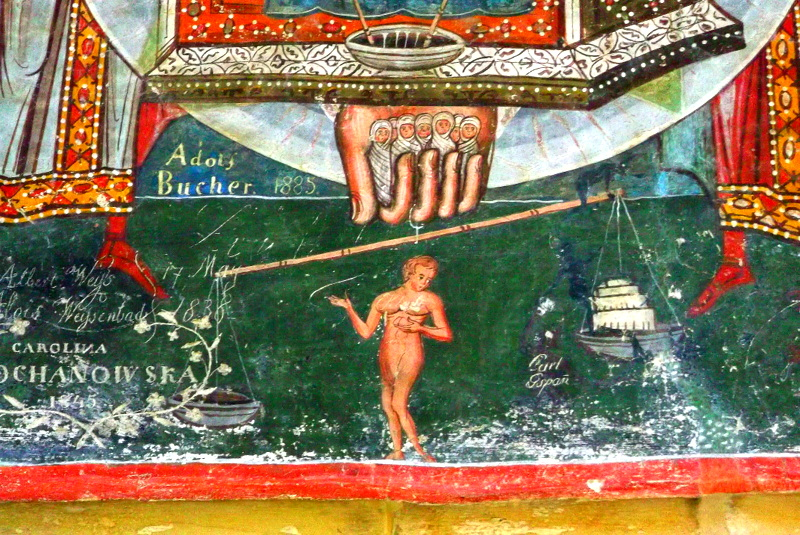
Frescoes

This monastery, built by Voivode Petru Rareș, is one of the eight monasteries in Northern Moldavia with frescoes painted on the outer walls. Sister Maika, who has been living in the monastery for more than 50 years, says that it is "the holy scriptures in color".

Moldovița's frescoes were painted by Toma of Suceava in 1537. They are filled with yellow accents and are well preserved. The predominantly yellow-and-blue paintings on its exterior represent recurring themes in Christian Orthodox art: a procession of saints leads up to the Virgin enthroned with the Child in her lap, above the narrow east window; the "Tree of Jesse" springs from a recumbent Jesse at the foot of the wall to marshal the ancestry of Christ around the Holy Family; The "Siege of Constantinople" commemorates the intervention of the Virgin in saving the city of Constantinople from Persian attack in A.D. 626 (although the siege depicted is rather the Fall of Constantinople in 1453).

Tall arches open the porch to the outside and daylight. Within it, "The Last Judgment" covers the entire surface of the west wall with its river of fire and its depiction of the sea giving up its dead to judgment. Moldovița and Humor are the last churches built with an open porch, a hidden place above the burial-vault, and with Gothic-style windows and doors.

== Trivia ==
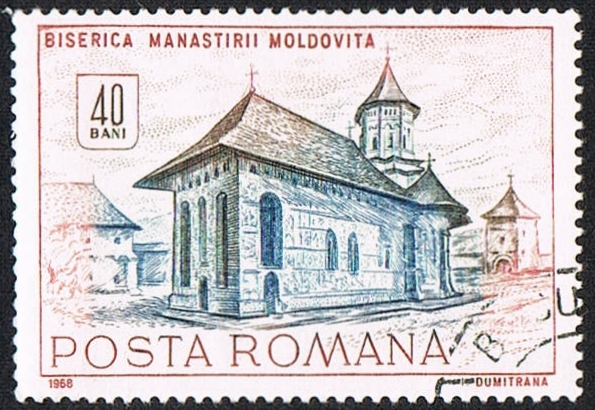
Moldovita on stamp of Romanian post, 1968

The monastery of Moldovița was depicted on a Romanian postage stamp in 1968.
