= Vatra Moldoviței =

Vatra Moldoviței German: Watra Moldawitza
- Commune
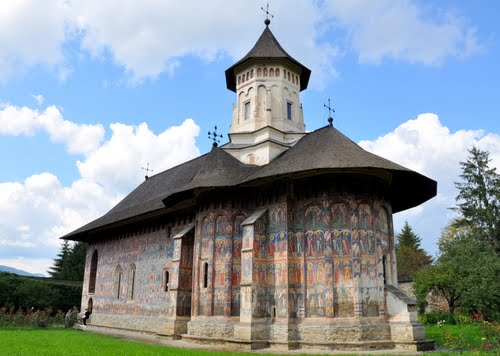
- Moldovița painted monastery, UNESCO monument, part of the Churches of Moldavia

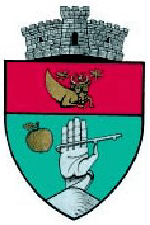
- Coat of arms

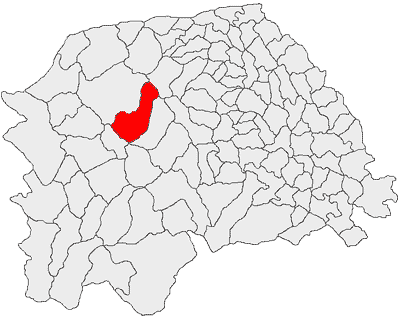
- Location in Suceava County

- Location in Romania
- Coordinates: 47°39′N 25°34′E
- Country: Romania
- County: Suceava
- Established: 1402 (first attested)
- Area: 17.02 km^{2} (6.57 sq mi)
- Highest elevation: 1,380 m (4,530 ft)
- Lowest elevation: 588 m (1,929 ft)
- Population (2021-12-01): 3,779
  - Density: 222.0/km^{2} (575.1/sq mi)
- Time zone: UTC+02:00 (EET)
  - Summer (DST): UTC+03:00 (EEST)
- Postal code: 727595
- Area code: +40 230
- Vehicle reg.: SV
- Website: Vatra Moldoviței Townhall site

Vatra Moldoviței (German: Watra Moldawitza or Moldowitza-Watra) is a commune located in the western-central part of Suceava County, in the historical region of Bukovina, northeastern Romania.

It is composed of three villages, namely: Ciumârna (German: Czumurna), Paltinu (German: Ruși pe Boul, or previously Valea Boului or Ochsenthal), and Vatra Moldoviței.

The latter village is the site of the UNESCO World Heritage Site Moldovița Monastery. It lies on the banks of Moldovița River and some of its tributaries Ciumârna and Paltinu. It is flanked by two of the Bukovina Ridges (Romanian: Obcinele Bucovinei): the Great Ridge (Romanian: Obcina Mare) and the Feredeu Ridge (Romanian: Obcina Feredeului).

The first official record referring to the Vatra Moldoviței area dates to the time of Alexander the Good, who founded the Moldovița Monastery in 1402. In the past, in its relatively recent history, more specifically in the modern period and up until the mid 20th century, the commune was also home to a sizeable German population, more specifically Bukovina Germans.

Vatra Moldoviței is also part of the Via Transilvanica long-distance trail.

== History ==
Historical affiliations

Moldavia (1388–1775)
Habsburg Monarchy (1775–1804)
Austrian Empire (1804–1867)
Austria-Hungary, Cisleithania (1867–1918)
Kingdom of Romania (1918–1947)
Romanian People's Republic (1947–1965)
Socialist Republic of Romania (1965–1989)
Romania (1989–present)

The commune was first attested during the early 15th century. Subsequently, several centuries later, part of the historical region of Bukovina, Vatra Moldoviței was under Habsburg and Austrian rule (being part of the Duchy of Bukovina, Cisleithania) until 1918 when it became part of the Kingdom of Romania.

== Administration and local politics ==
=== Communal council ===
The commune's current local council has the following political composition, according to the results of the 2020 Romanian local elections:

| Party | Seats | Current Council |
|---|---|---|
| National Liberal Party (PNL) | 8 | |
| Social Democratic Party (PSD) | 3 | |
| Union of the Ukrainians of Romania (UUR) | 2 | |

== Gallery ==
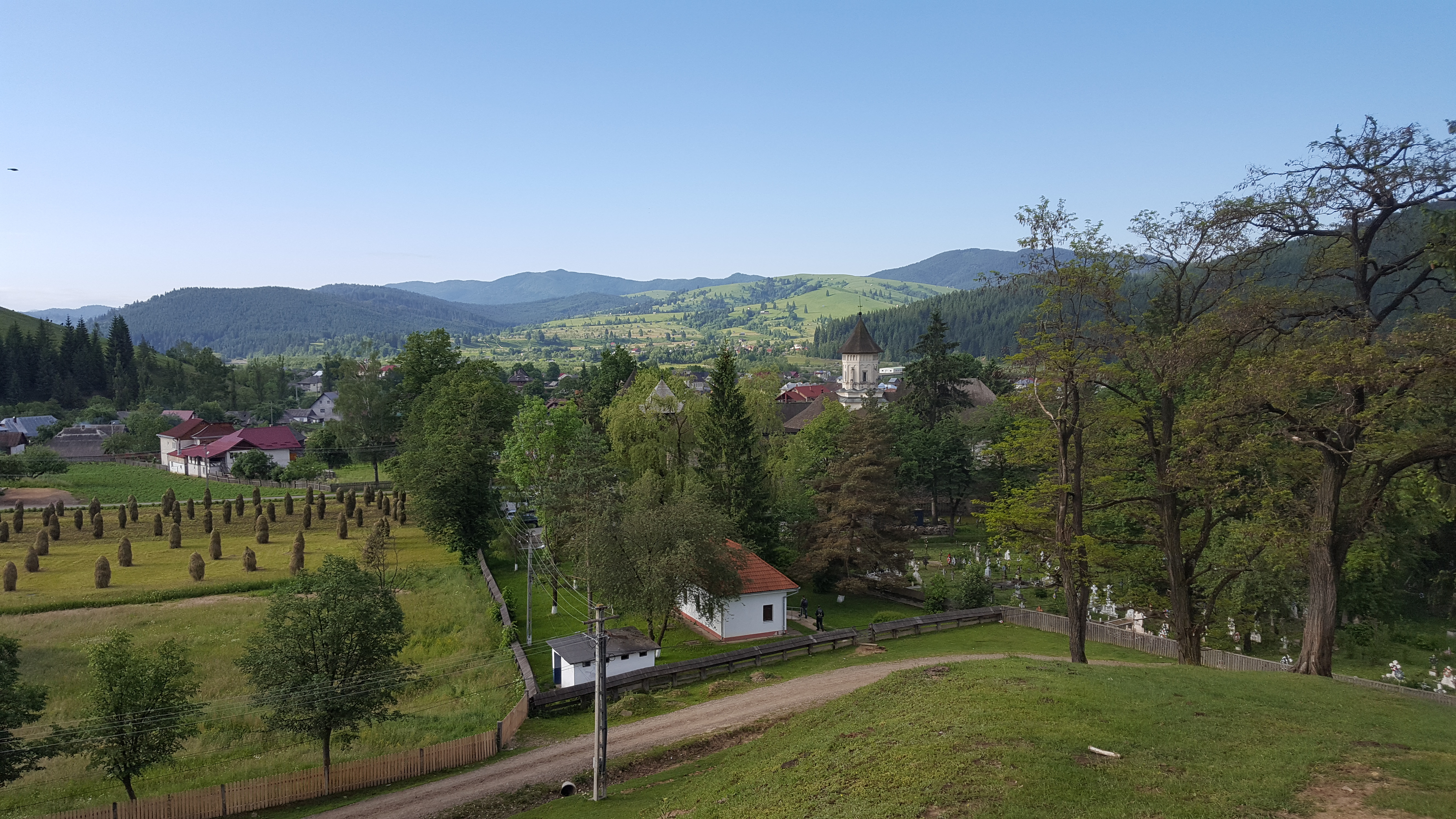
Panoramic view of Vatra Moldoviței

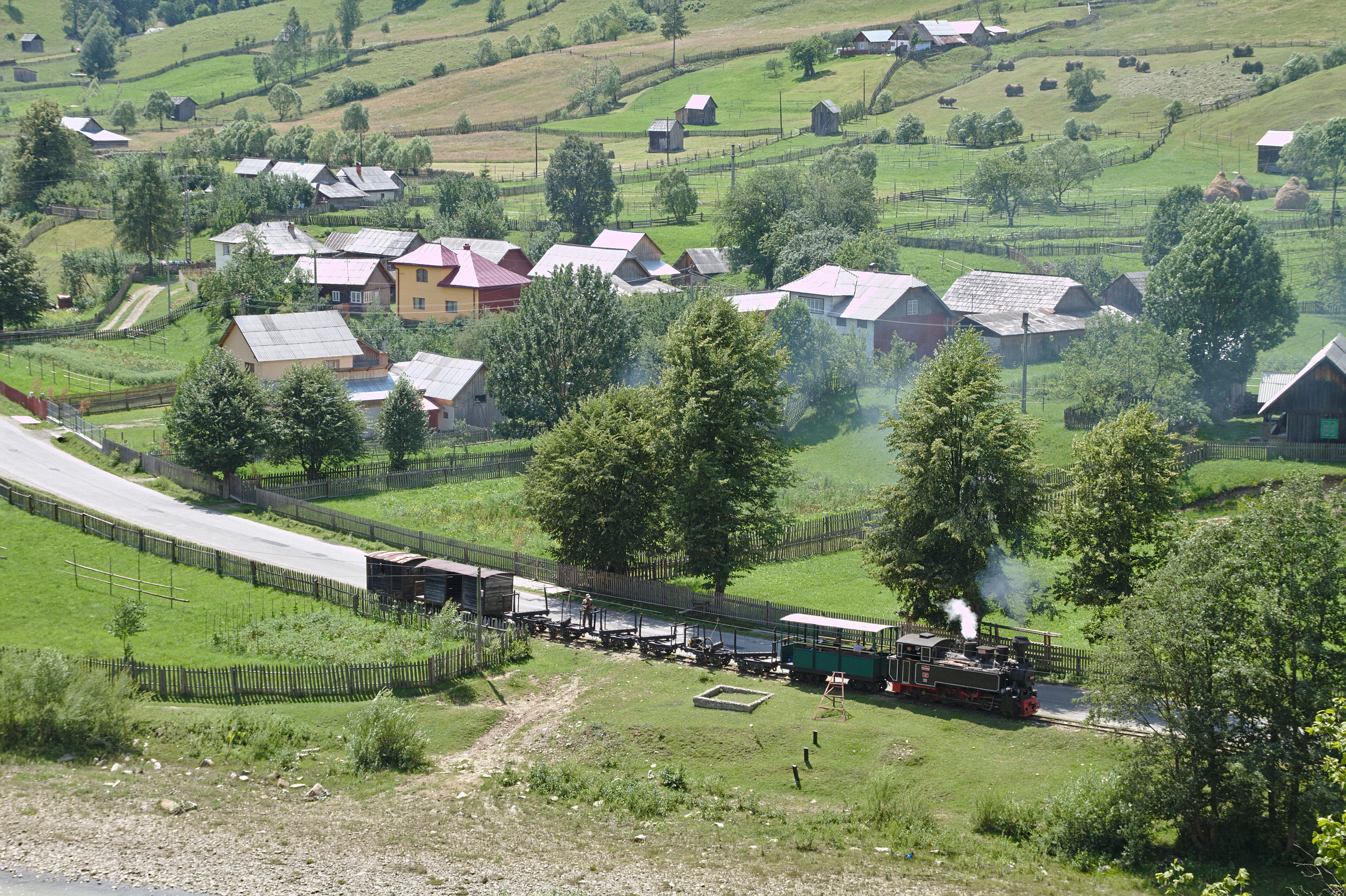
The narrow-gauge steam train Huțulca-Mocănița-Moldovița in Vatra Moldoviței

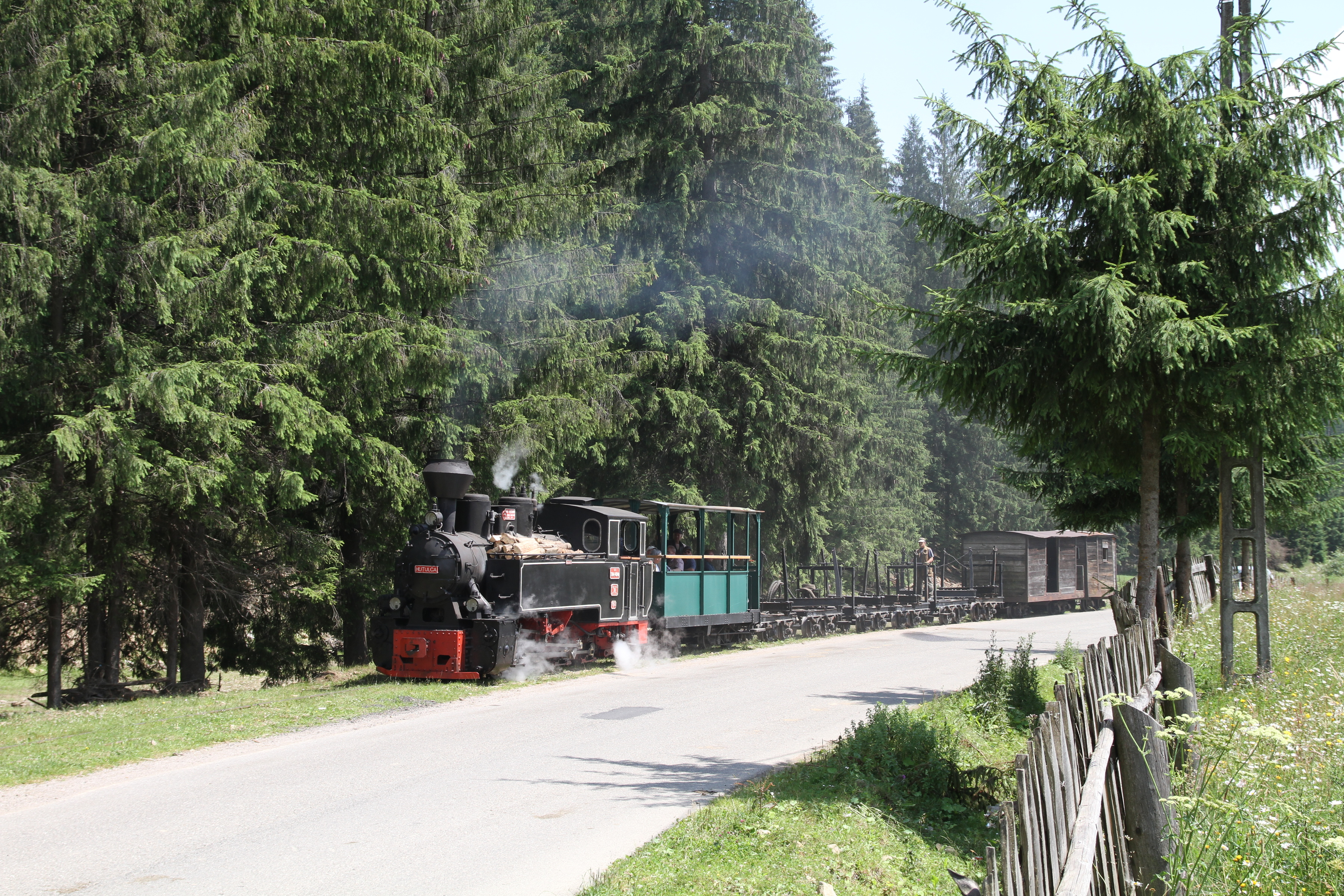
Moldovița forest railway

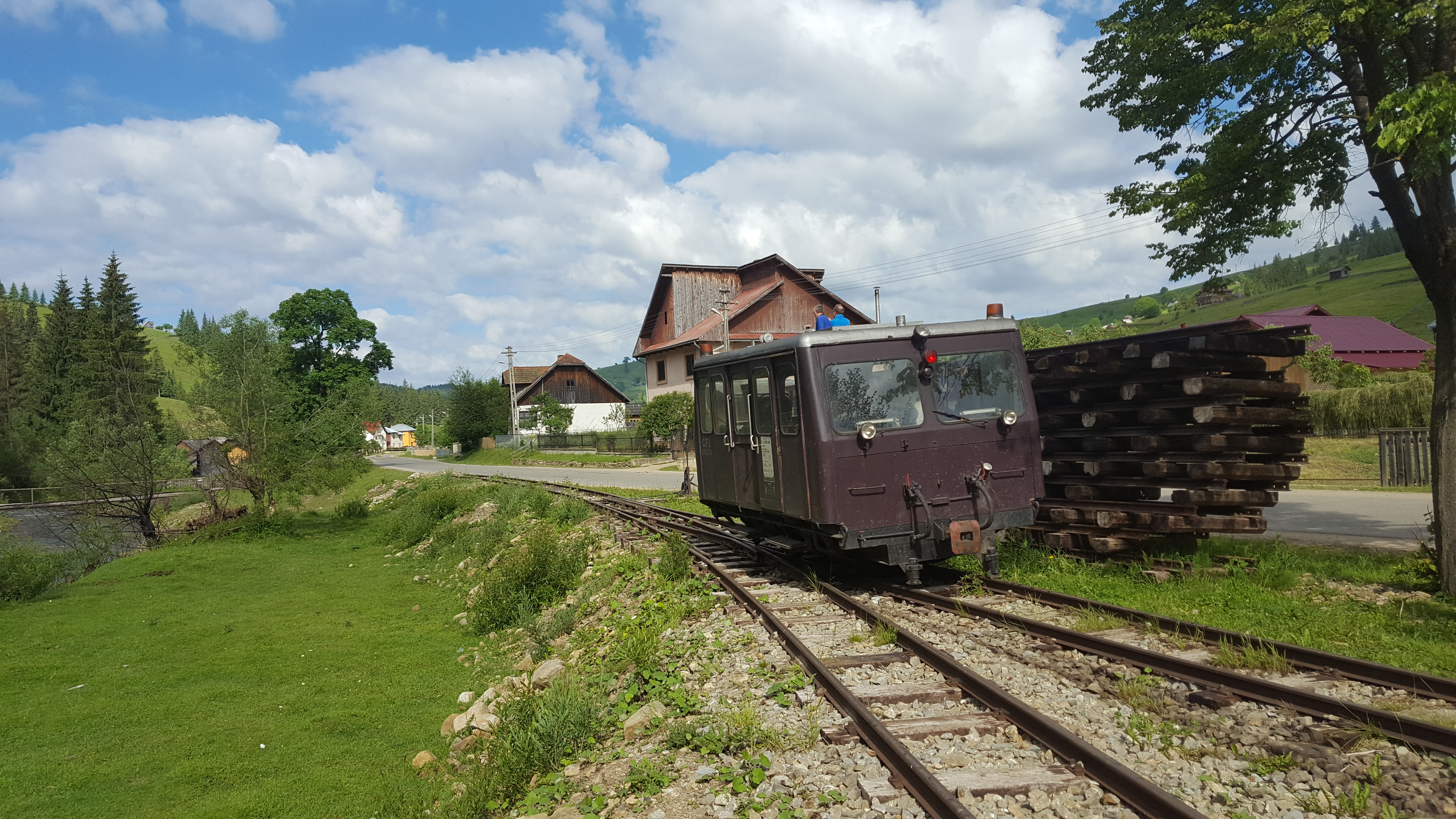
Moldovița forest railway

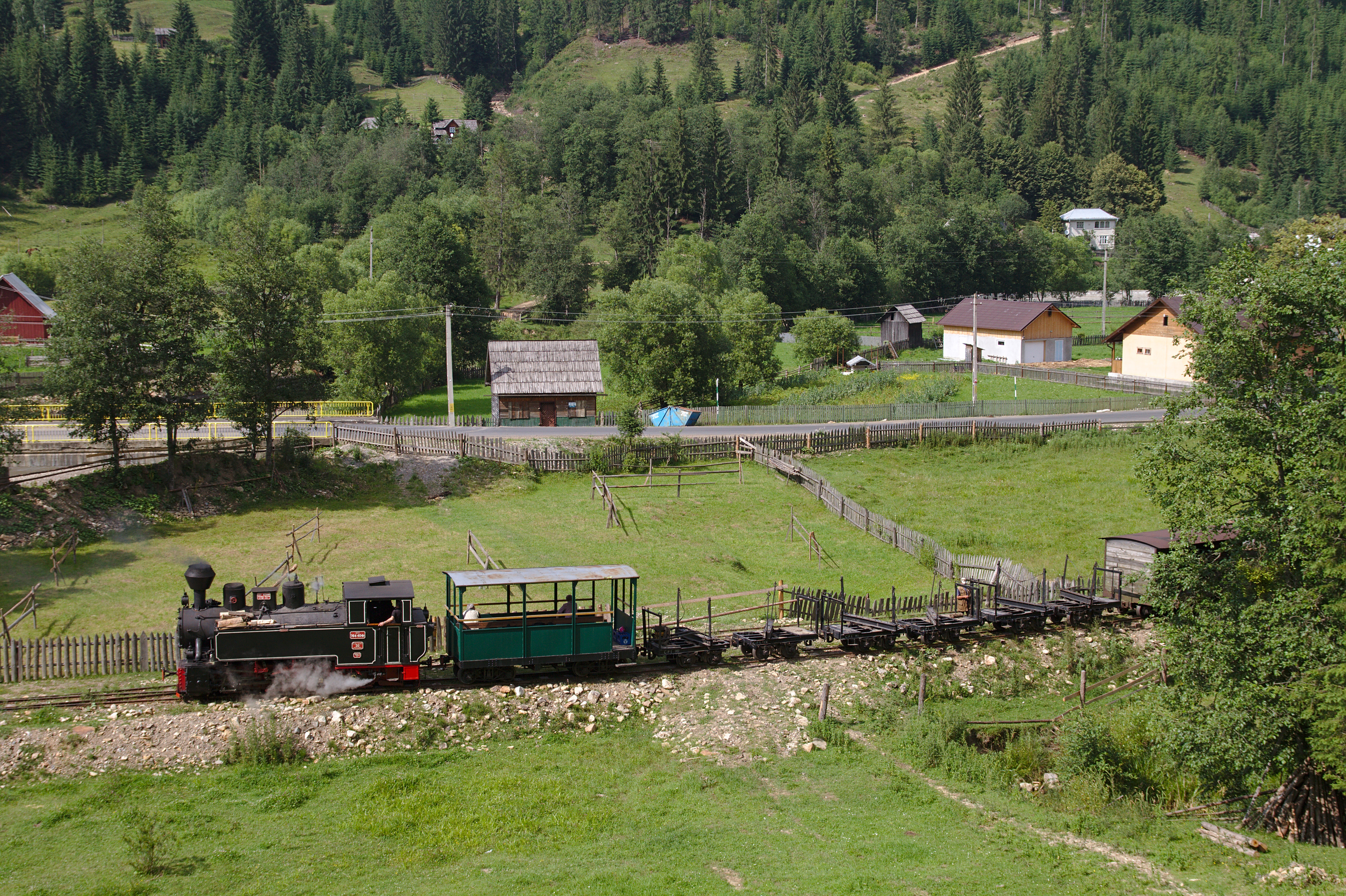
Moldovița forest railway

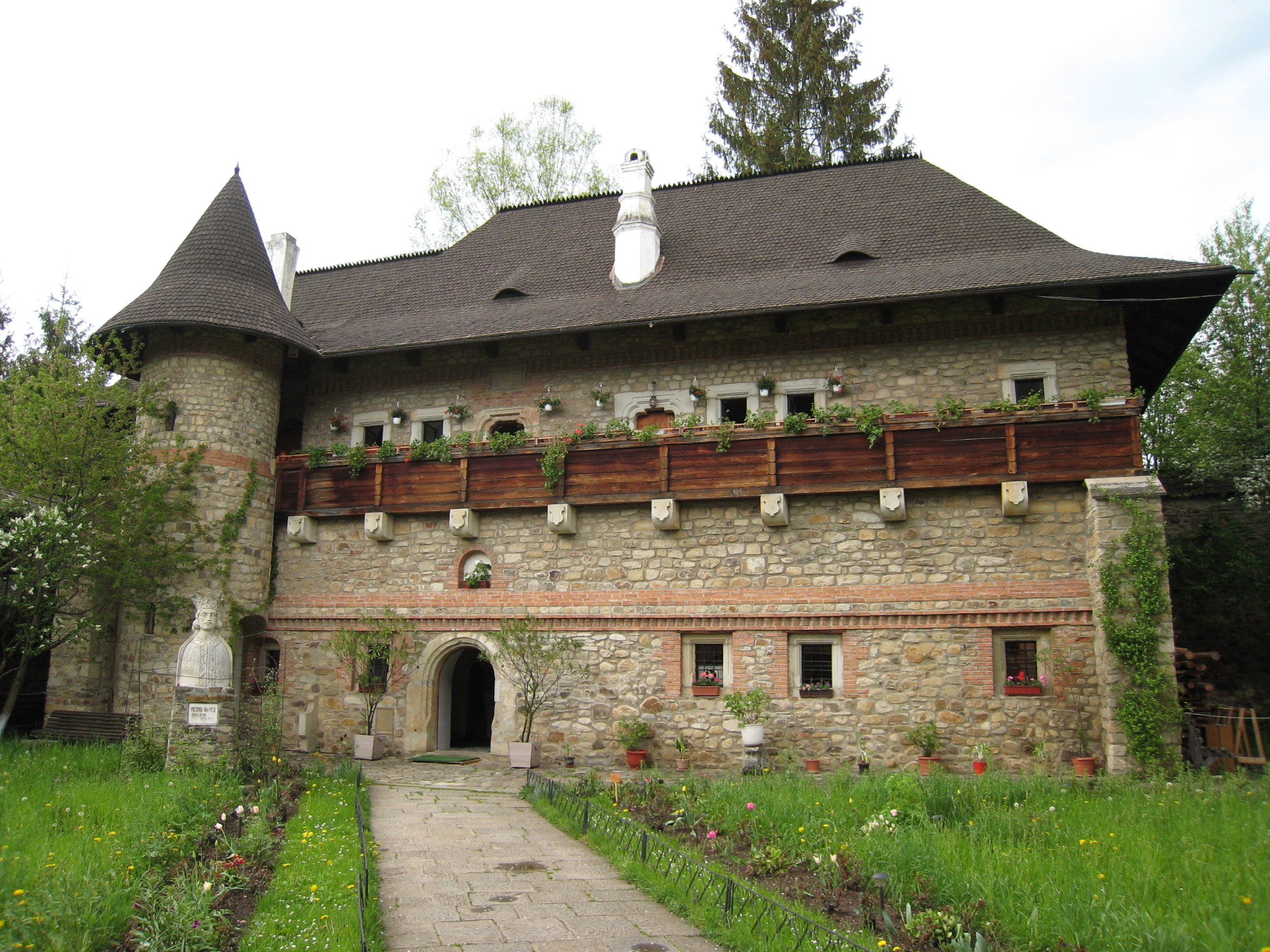
Inside Moldovița Monastery

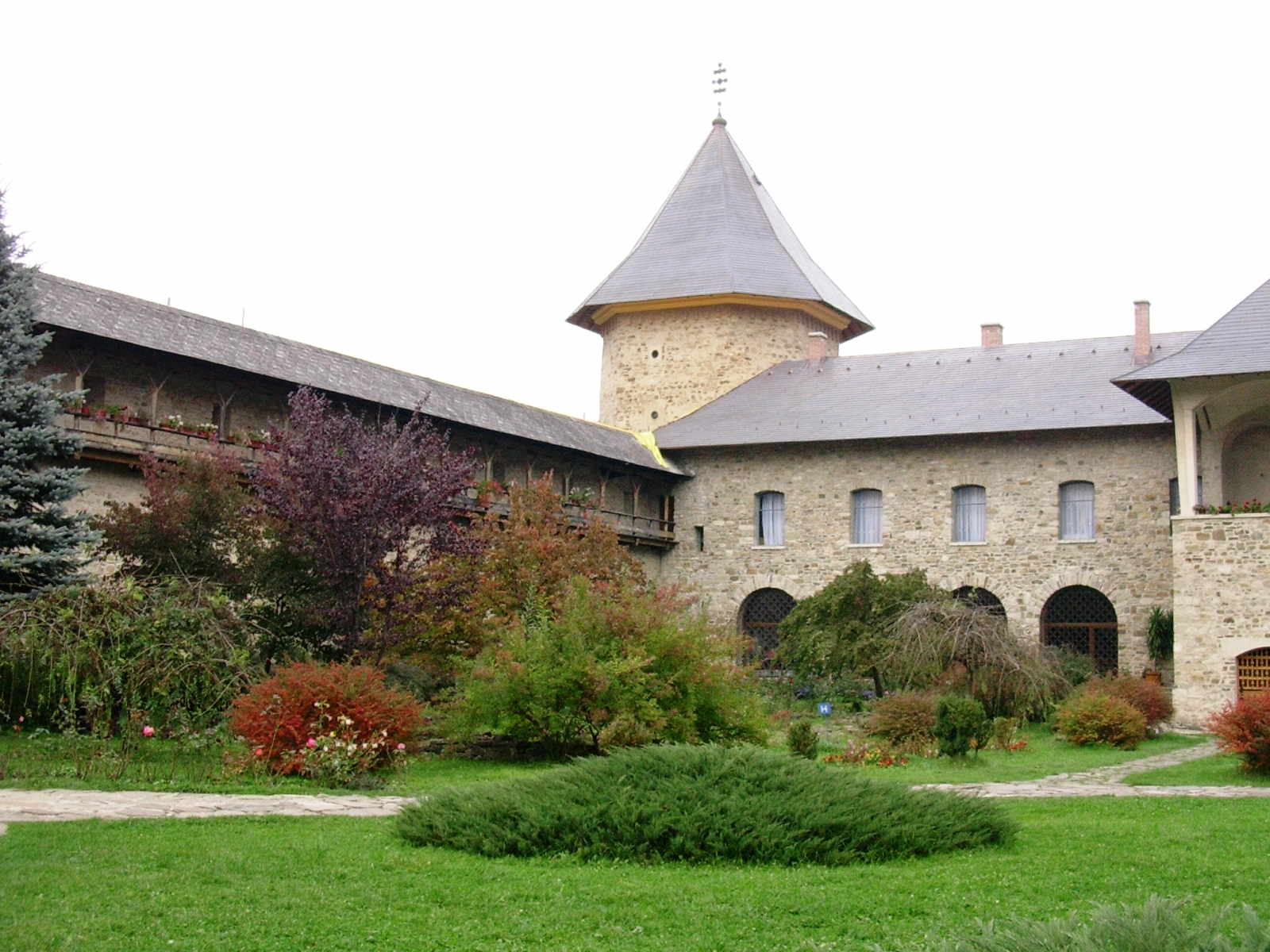
Inside Moldovița Monastery

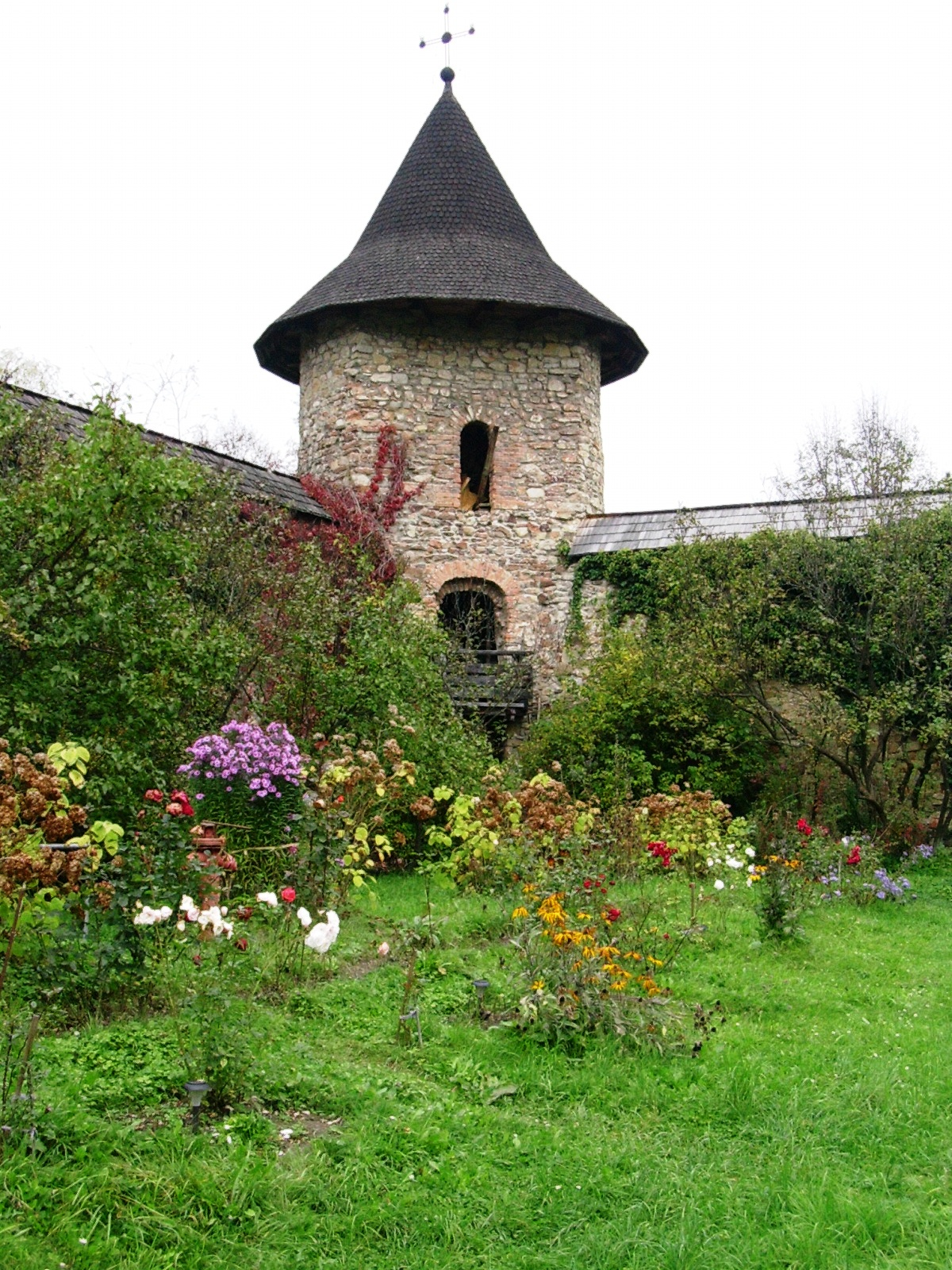
Inside Moldovița Monastery
