= List of natural reservations of Suceava County =

The list of natural reservation of Suceava County includes protected areas of national interest (nature reserves), located in the administrative territory of Suceava County, Romania.

== List of protected area ==
Name of protected areas	Location	IUCN Category	Type	Surface (ha)	Observation (photo)
Slatioara old-growth forest	Slătioara	IV	forester	1.064,20	Slătioara
Giumalău old-growth forest	Pojorâta	IV	forester	309,50	
Loben old-growth forest	Moldovița	IV	forester	483	
Cheile Zugrenilor	Vatra Dornei	IV	mixt	150,10	
Cheile Lucavei	Moldova-Sulița	IV	mixt	24,30	
Twelve Apostles	Dorna Candrenilor	III	mixt	200	monument of nature
Calafindești hayfields	Calafindești	IV	botanic	17,30	
Frumoasa hayfields	Moara	IV	floristic	9,50	
Todirescu mountainous hayfield	Câmpulung Moldovenesc	IV	floristic	44,30	
Ponoare hayfield	Bosanci	IV	floristic	24,50	
Dragomirna Fugget	Mitocu Dragomirnei	IV	forester	134,80	
Jnepenișul cu Pinus cembra - Călimani	Vatra Dornei	IV	forester	384,20	
Pârâul Cailor Triassic limestone klippa	Breaza	III	geologic-palaeontology	0,10	monument of nature
Devil's Mill	Câmpulung Moldovenesc	III	geologic	1,30	monument of nature
Crujana forest	Pătrăuți	IV	forester	39,40	
Roșoșa forest	Moldovița	IV	forester	205	declared from HG 1143/2007
Voivodeasa forest	Sucevița	IV	forester	102	declared from HG 1143/2007
Zamostea - Lunca Forest	Zamostea	IV	forester	107,60	
Buhei RockBuhei Rock	Câmpulung Moldovenesc	III	geologic-palaeontology	2	monument of nature
Rock of Țibau	Cârlibaba	III	geologic	20,30	monument of nature
Rock of Pine and Șoimului Rock	Gura Humorului	IV	geologic-palaeontology	0,50	
The Lady's StonesPietrele Doamnei	Câmpulung Moldovenesc	IV	mixt	253	
Big Răchitișul	Moldova-Sulița	IV	botanic	116,40	
Bila-Lala Reservation	Cârlibaba	IV	mixt	325,10	
The Aptychus layer from Pojor	Fundu Moldovei	IV	palaeontological	1	
Tinovul Găina - Lucina	Moldova-Sulița	IV	botanic	1	
Tinovul Poiana Stampei	Poiana Stampei	IV	botanic	681,80	
Tinovul Șaru Dornei	Șaru Dornei	IV	botanic	36	

== See also ==
- Protected areas of Romania
