= Moara Dracului =

Moara Dracului may refer to the following places in Romania:

- Moara Dracului, tributary of the Drăgan in Bihor County
- Moara Dracului Gorge, in Suceava County

== See also ==
- Moara (disambiguation)
