= Morar (disambiguation) =

Morar is a village on the west coast of Scotland. It is also applied to the northern part of the peninsula containing the village, though North Morar is more usual.

Morar may also refer to:

- Loch Morar
- Morar railway station
- Morar, now part of Gwalior, India, a former town and British military cantonment
- Morar Cantonment
- Morar, Nova Scotia
- Moraro, or Morar in Slovene, a commune of Italy
- Morar (surname)

== See also ==
- Moraru (disambiguation)
- Moara (disambiguation)
- Morarji Desai, Indian prime minister from 1977 to 1979
