= Bessarabia =

Historical region in Moldova and Ukraine

Coordinates: 47°N 29°E

Bessarabia Basarabia (Romanian) Бессарабия (Russian) Бессарабія (Ukrainian) Besarabiya (Gagauz) Бесарабия (Bulgarian)
- Historical region of Eastern Europe
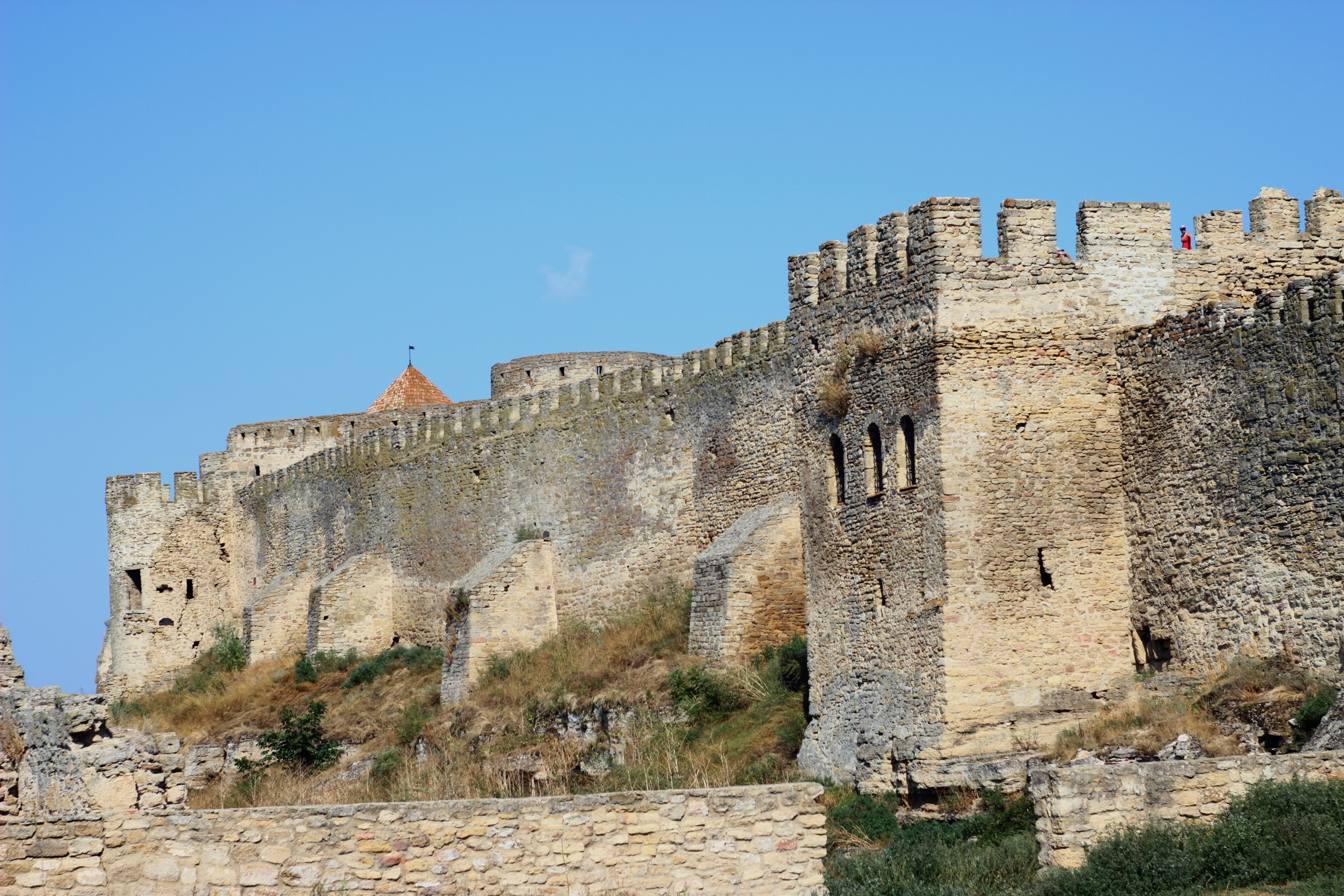
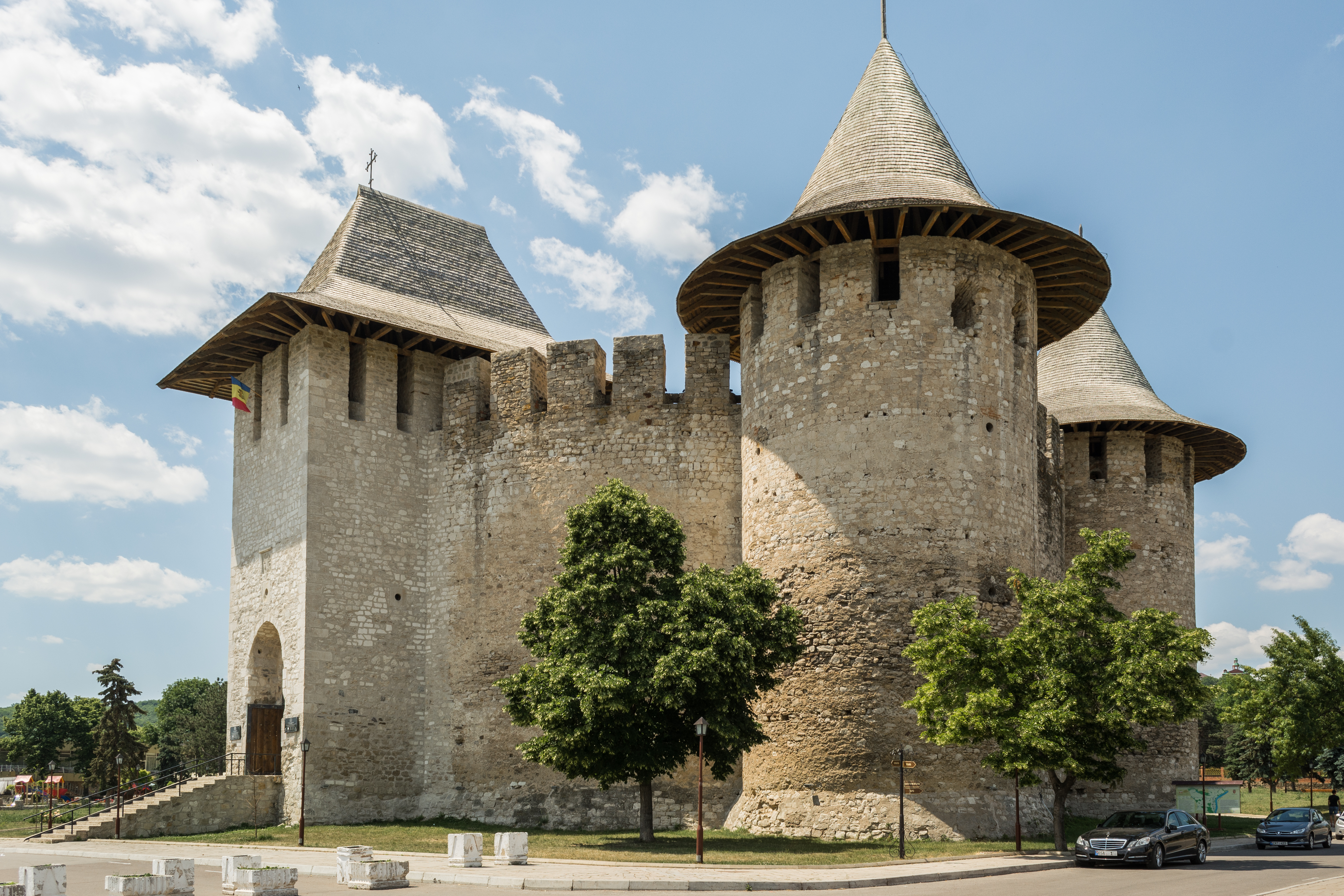
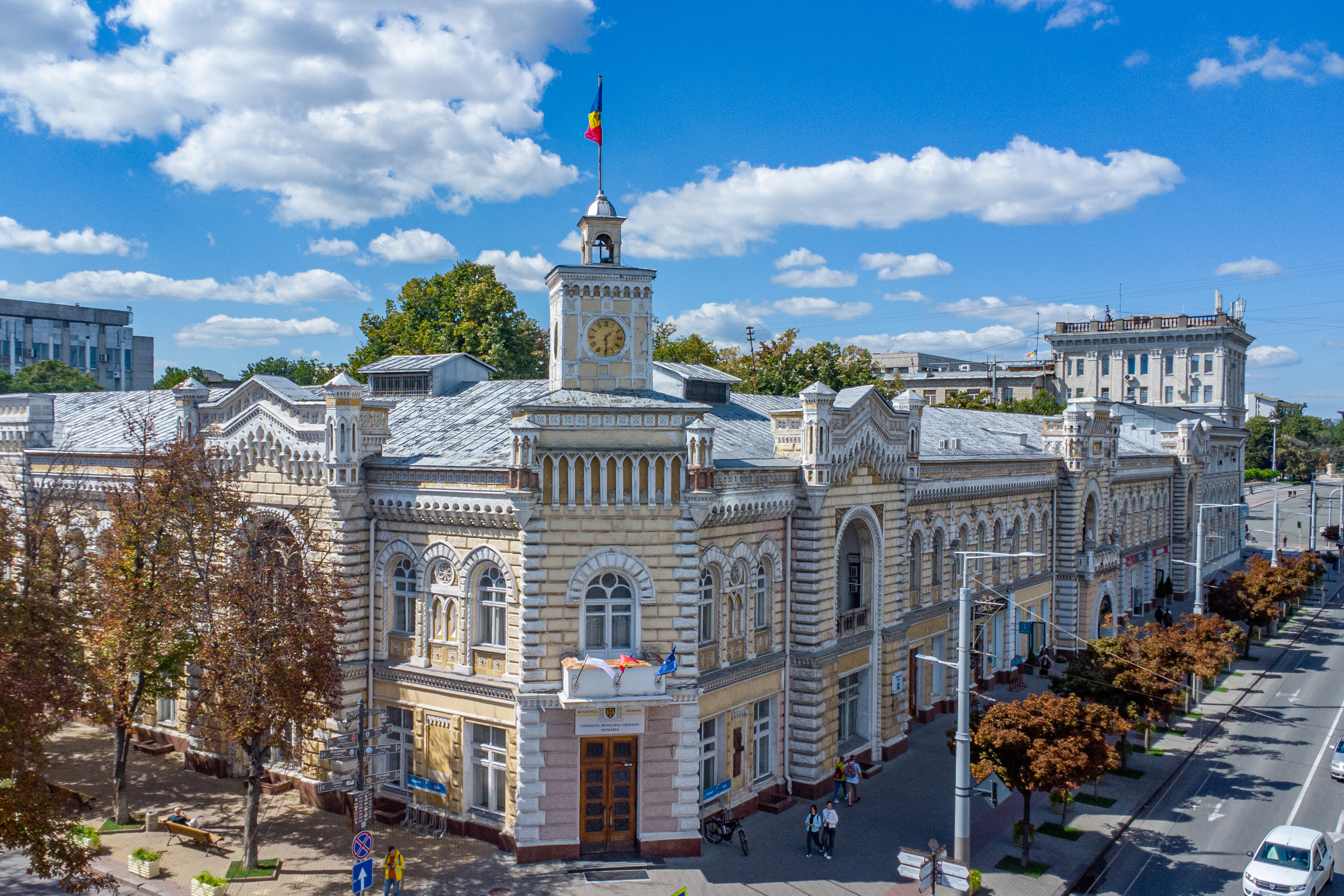
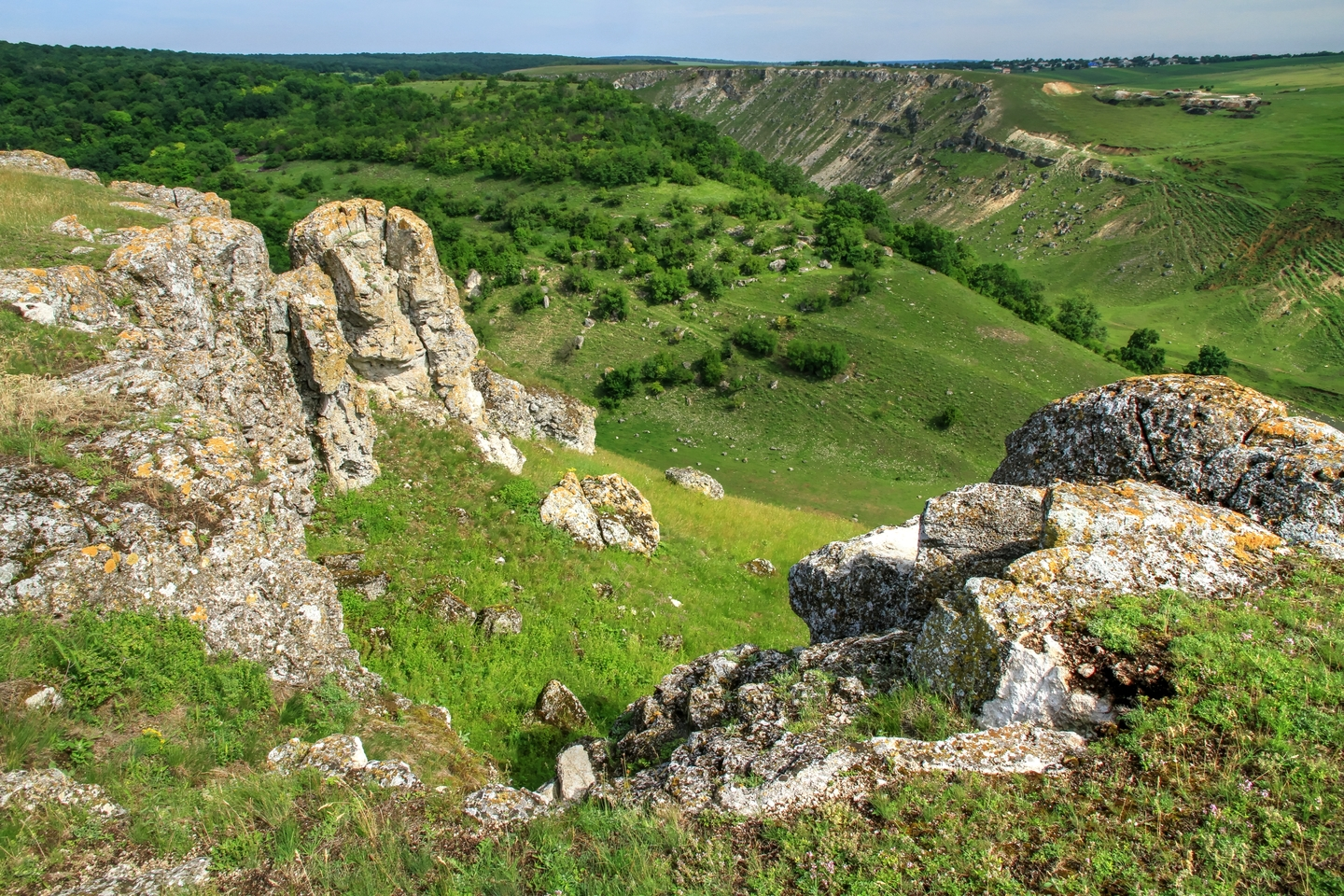
- From top, left to right: Akkerman fortress; Soroca Fort; Chișinău City Hall; La Castel landscape reserve near Gordinești, Edineț

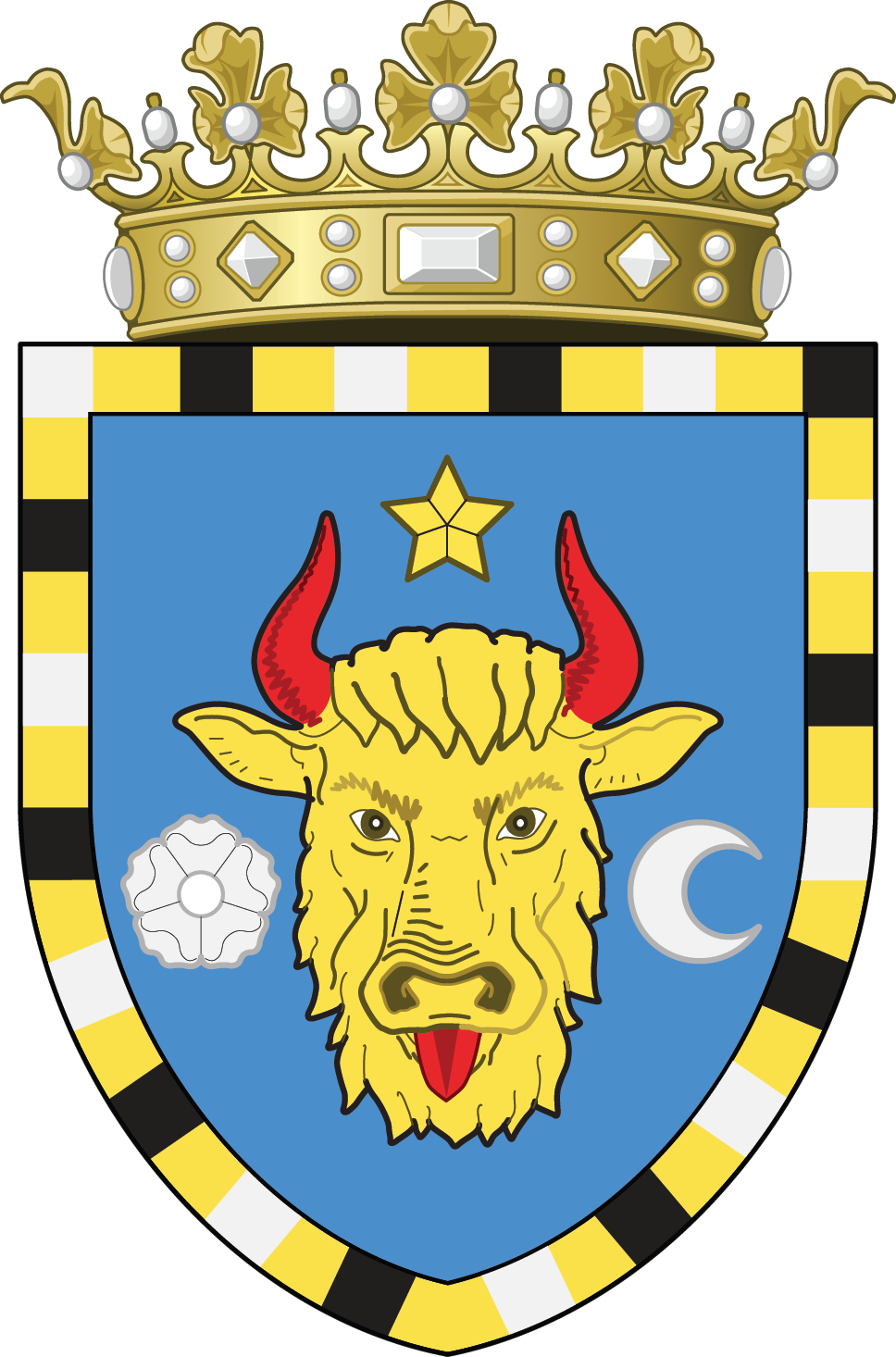
- Coat of arms

- Map of Bessarabia within Moldova and Ukraine
- Country: Moldova; Ukraine
- Largest city: Chișinău
- Time zone: UTC+2 (EET)
  - Summer (DST): UTC+3 (EEST)
- Primary airport: Chișinău Eugen Doga International Airport

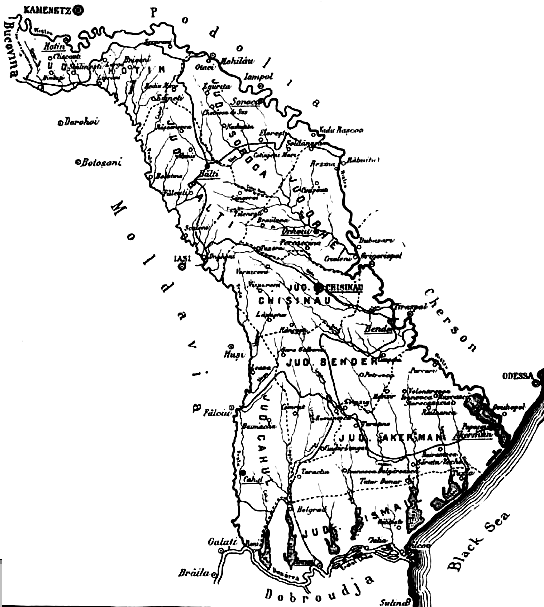
Map of Bessarabia from Charles Upson Clark's 1927 book Bessarabia, Russia and Romania on the Black Sea

Bessarabia (Note: Bulgarian: Бесарабия, romanized: Besarabiya; Gagauz: Besarabiya; Romanian: Basarabia; Russian: Бессарабия, romanized: Bessarabiya; Ukrainian: Бессарабія, romanized: Bessarabiia) (/ˌbɛsəˈreɪbiə/) is a historical region in Eastern Europe, bounded by the Dniester river on the east and the Prut river on the west. About two thirds of Bessarabia lies within modern-day Moldova, with the Budjak region covering the southern coastal region and part of the Ukrainian Chernivtsi Oblast covering a small area in the north.

In the late 14th century, the newly established Principality of Moldavia encompassed what later became known as Bessarabia. Afterward, this territory was directly or indirectly, partly or wholly controlled by several powers: the Ottoman Empire (as suzerain of Moldavia, with direct rule only in Budjak and Khotyn), the Russian Empire, Romania, and the Soviet Union.

In the aftermath of the Russo-Turkish War (1806–1812), and the ensuing Peace of Bucharest, the eastern parts of the Principality of Moldavia, an Ottoman vassal, along with some areas formerly under direct Ottoman rule, were ceded to Imperial Russia. The acquisition was among the Russian Empire's last territorial acquisitions in Europe. The newly acquired territories were organised as the Bessarabia Governorate of the Russian Empire, adopting a name previously used for the southern plains between the Dniester and the Danube rivers. After the Crimean War, in 1856, the southern areas of Bessarabia were returned to Moldavian rule; Russian rule was restored over the whole of the region in 1878, when Romania, the result of Moldavia's union with Wallachia, was pressured into exchanging those territories for the Dobruja.

In 1917, in the wake of the Russian Revolution, the area constituted itself as the Moldavian Democratic Republic, an autonomous republic part of a proposed federative Russian state. Bolshevik agitation in late 1917 and early 1918 resulted in the intervention of the Romanian Army, ostensibly to pacify the region. Soon after, the parliamentary assembly declared independence, and then union with the Kingdom of Romania. However, the legality of these acts was disputed, most prominently by the Soviet Union, which regarded the area as a territory occupied by Romania.

In 1940, after securing the assent of Nazi Germany through the Molotov–Ribbentrop Pact, the Soviet Union pressured Romania, under threat of war, into withdrawing from Bessarabia, allowing the Red Army to enter and the Soviet Union to annex the region. The area was formally integrated into the Soviet Union: the core joined parts of the Moldavian Autonomous Soviet Socialist Republic to form the Moldavian Soviet Socialist Republic, while territories in the north and the south of Bessarabia were transferred to the Ukrainian SSR. Axis-aligned Romania recaptured the region in 1941 with the success of Operation München during the Nazi invasion of the Soviet Union, but lost it in 1944 as the tide of war turned. In 1947, the Soviet-Romanian border along the Prut was internationally recognised by the Treaty of Paris that formally ended hostilities of World War II.

During the process of the dissolution of the Soviet Union, the Moldavian and Ukrainian SSRs proclaimed their independence in 1991, becoming the modern states of Moldova and Ukraine while preserving the existing partition of Bessarabia. After a short war in the early 1990s, the Pridnestrovian Moldavian Republic was proclaimed in the Transnistria, extending its authority also over the municipality of Bender on the right bank of Dniester river. Part of the Gagauz-inhabited areas in southern Bessarabia was organized in 1994 as an autonomous region within Moldova.

== Etymology ==
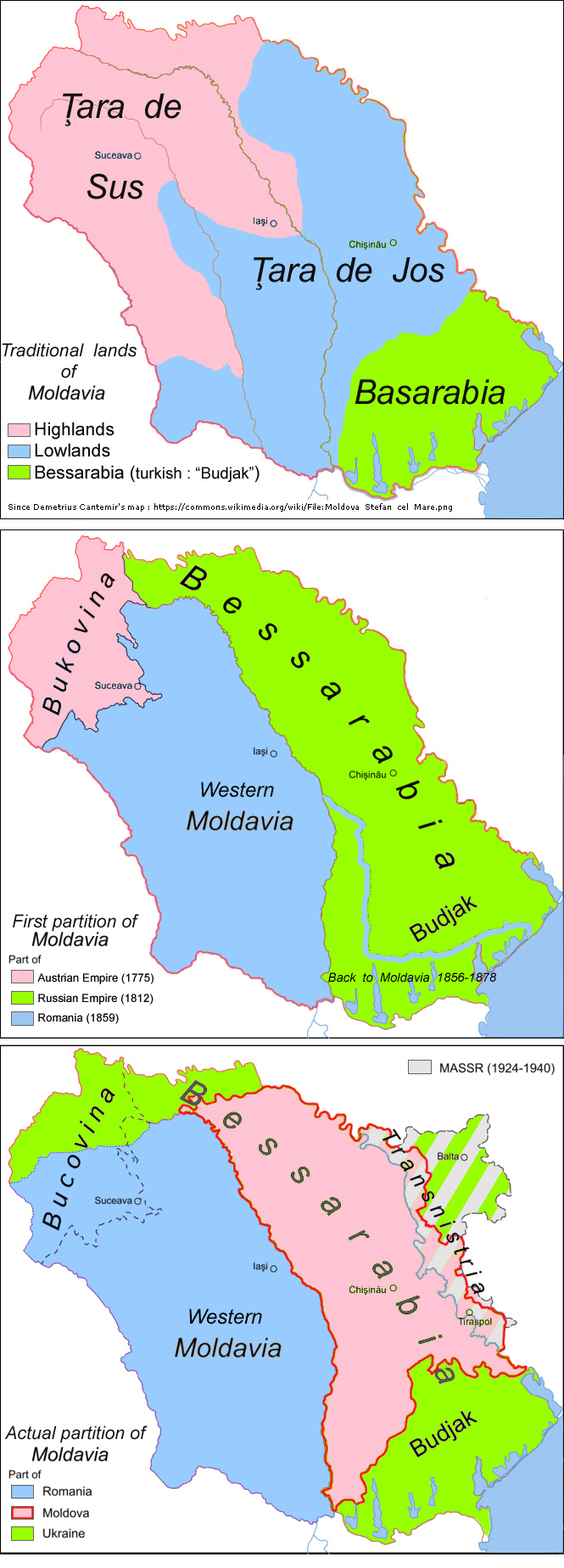
Map of Bessarabia within Moldavia through time

According to the traditional explanation, the name Bessarabia (Basarabia in Romanian) derives from the Wallachian Basarab dynasty, who allegedly ruled over the southern part of the area in the 14th century. The name "Basarab" is likely of Cuman or Pecheneg Turkic origin and most likely meant "father ruler". However, some scholars question this, arguing that:

- The name was initially an exonym applied by Western cartographers.
- It was first used in local sources only in the late 17th century.
- The idea that it referred to Moldavian regions near the Black Sea was explicitly rejected as a cartographic confusion by the early Moldavian chronicler Miron Costin.
- The confusion may have been caused by medieval Western cartographers, misinterpreting contemporaneous Polish references to Wallachia as Bessarabia as referring to a separate land between Wallachia and Moldavia.

According to Dimitrie Cantemir, the name Bessarabia originally applied only to the part of the territory south of the Upper Trajanic Wall, i.e. an area only slightly larger than present-day Budjak.

Linguist Dan Alexe argues that the name Bessarabia/Basarabia is most probably of Iranian origin. He states that Neagu Djuvara's proposed Cuman origin, from basar ("to rule") and aba ("father") is not realistic. Instead, he proposes the origin as an Iranian ba sar ab, composed of ba ("at", "on", "to"), sar (meaning either "head" or the preposition "on") and ab ("water"). To strengthen his hypothesis, Alexe mentions how many other rivers, including the Ob, were simply named "water" (ab) by Iranophone populations. He states how the ab particle can also be found in other toponyms, such as Punjab ("five rivers"). Moreover, Djuvara talks about a possible Cuman origin of the Basarab family, to which Alexe adds that the Cuman nobility is known from the Codex Cumanicus to have also been Iranophone. Thus, Bessarabia (ba sar ab) would simply mean "by the water" or "headwater", as in the point where the Danube flows into the Black Sea. Yet another argument used by Alexe is that many rivers in the Black Sea area have, since antiquity, names stemming from Iranophone tribes containing the don- ("water", "river") particle, such as the Don, the Danube, the Dnieper and the Dniester.

== Geography ==
The region is bounded by the Dniester to the north and east, the Prut to the west, and the lower River Danube and Black Sea to the south. It has an area of 45,630 km^{2} (17,620 sq mi). The area is mostly hilly plains and flat steppes. It is very fertile and has lignite deposits and stone quarries. People living in the area grow sugar beet, sunflower, wheat, maize, tobacco, wine grapes, and fruit. They raise sheep and cattle. The main industry in the region is agricultural processing.

The main Bessarabian cities are Chișinău, the former capital of the Russian Bessarabia Governorate, now capital of Moldova; Bălți, on the river Răut, often dubbed the "Northern capital" of Moldova; Bender/Tighina, on the Dniester, currently controlled by the unrecognized Russian-backed separatist region of Transnistria; Izmail, in the southwest corner of Ukraine on the Danube; and Bilhorod-Dnistrovskyi, historically known as Cetatea Albă or Akkerman, also in southwestern Ukraine near Odesa. Other towns of administrative or historical importance include Cahul, Soroca, Orhei, Ungheni and Comrat, all now in Moldova; and Khotyn, Kiliia, Reni and Bolhrad, all now in Ukraine.

== History ==
In the late 14th century, the newly established Principality of Moldavia encompassed what later became known as Bessarabia. Afterward, this territory was directly or indirectly, partly or wholly controlled by: the Ottoman Empire (as suzerain of Moldavia, with direct rule only in Budjak and Khotyn), the Russian Empire, Romania, the USSR. Since 1991, most of the territory forms the core of Moldova, with smaller parts in Ukraine.

=== Prehistory ===
People have inhabited the territory of Bessarabia for thousands of years. Cucuteni–Trypillia culture flourished between the 6th and 3rd millennium BC.

=== Ancient times ===
In Antiquity the region was inhabited by Thracians, as well as for shorter periods by Cimmerians, Scythians, Sarmatians, and Celts, specifically by tribes such as the Costoboci, Carpi, Britogali, Tyragetae, and Bastarnae. In the 6th century BC, Greek settlers established the colony of Tyras along the Black Sea coast and traded with the locals. Celts also settled in the southern parts of Bessarabia, their main city being Aliobrix.

The first polity that is believed to have included the whole of Bessarabia was the Dacian polity of Burebista in the 1st century BC. After his death, the polity was divided into smaller pieces, and the central parts were unified in the Dacian kingdom of Decebalus in the 1st century AD. The kingdom was defeated by the Roman Empire in 106. Southern Bessarabia was included in the empire even before that, in 57 AD, as part of the Roman province Moesia Inferior, but it was secured only when the Dacian Kingdom was defeated in 106. The Romans built defensive earthen walls in Southern Bessarabia (e.g. Lower Trajan Wall) to defend the Scythia Minor province against invasions. Except for the Black Sea shore in the south, Bessarabia remained outside direct Roman control; the myriad of tribes there are called by modern historians Free Dacians. The 2nd to the 5th centuries also saw the development of the Chernyakhov culture.

In 270, the Roman authorities began to withdraw their forces south of the Danube, especially from the Roman Dacia, due to the invading Goths and Carpi. The Goths, a Germanic tribe, poured into the Roman Empire from the lower Dniepr River, through the southern part of Bessarabia (Budjak steppe), which due to its geographic position and characteristics (mainly steppe), was swept by various nomadic tribes for many centuries. In 378, the area was overrun by the Huns.

=== Early Middle Ages ===
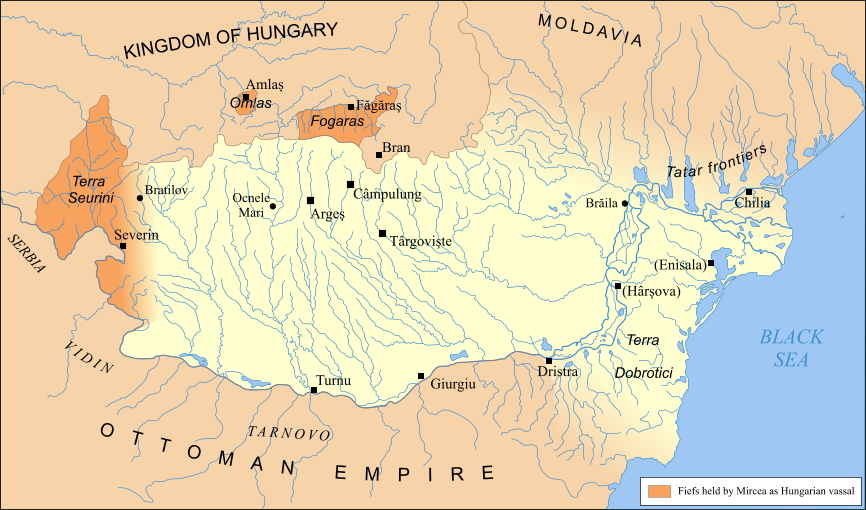
According to one theory, the region's name originated from the Wallachian rule during the late 14th century (1390 map).

From the 3rd century until the 11th century, the region was invaded numerous times in turn by different tribes: Goths, Huns, Avars, Bulgars, Magyars, Pechenegs, Cumans and Mongols. The territory of Bessarabia was encompassed in dozens of ephemeral kingdoms which were disbanded when another wave of migrants arrived. Those centuries were characterized by a terrible state of insecurity and mass movement of these tribes. The period was later known as the Dark Ages of Europe, or age of migrations.

In 561, the Avars captured Bessarabia and executed the local ruler Mesamer. After the Avars, Slavs arrived in the region and established settlements. Then, in 582, Onogur Bulgars settled in southeastern Bessarabia and northern Dobruja, from which they moved to Moesia Inferior (allegedly under pressure from the Khazars), and formed the nascent region of Bulgaria. With the rise of the Khazars' state in the east, the invasions began to diminish and it was possible to create larger states. According to some opinions, the southern part of Bessarabia remained under the influence of the First Bulgarian Empire until the end of the 9th century.

Between the 8th and 10th centuries, the southern part of Bessarabia was inhabited by people from the Balkan-Danubian culture (the culture of the First Bulgarian Empire). Between the 9th and 13th centuries, Bessarabia is mentioned in Slav chronicles as part of Bolohoveni (north) and Brodnici (south) voivodeships, believed to be Vlach principalities of the early Middle Ages.

The last large-scale invasions were those of the Mongols of 1241, 1290, and 1343. Sehr al-Jedid (near Orhei), an important settlement of the Golden Horde, dates from this period. They led to a retreat of a big part of the population to the mountainous areas in Eastern Carpathians and to Transylvania. The population east of Prut became especially low at the time of the Tatar invasions.

In the Late Middle Age, chronicles mention a Tigheci "republic", predating the establishment of the Principality of Moldavia, situated near the modern town of Cahul in the southwest of Bessarabia, preserving its autonomy even during the later Principality even into the 18th century. Genovese merchants rebuilt or established a number of forts along the Dniester (notably Moncastro) and Danube (including Kyliya/Chilia-Licostomo).

=== Principality of Moldavia ===
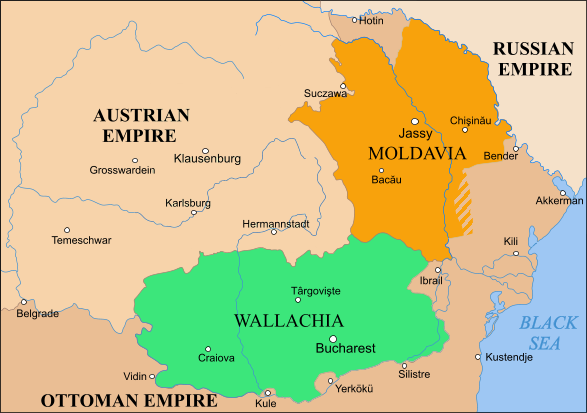
Most of Bessarabia was for centuries part of the principality of Moldavia (1800 map).

After the 1360s, the region was gradually included in the principality of Moldavia, which by 1392 established control over the fortresses of Akkerman and Chilia, its eastern border becoming the River Dniester. Based on the name of the region, some authors consider that in the latter part of the 14th century the southern part of the region was under the rule of Wallachia (the ruling dynasty of Wallachia during the period was called Basarab). In the 15th century, the entire region was a part of the principality of Moldavia. Stephen the Great ruled between 1457 and 1504, a period of nearly 50 years during which he won 32 battles defending his country against virtually all his neighbours (mainly the Ottomans and the Tatars, but also the Hungarians and the Poles) while losing only two. During this period, after each victory, he raised a monastery or a church close to the battlefield honoring Christianity. Many of these battlefields and churches, as well as old fortresses, are situated in Bessarabia (mainly along Dniester).

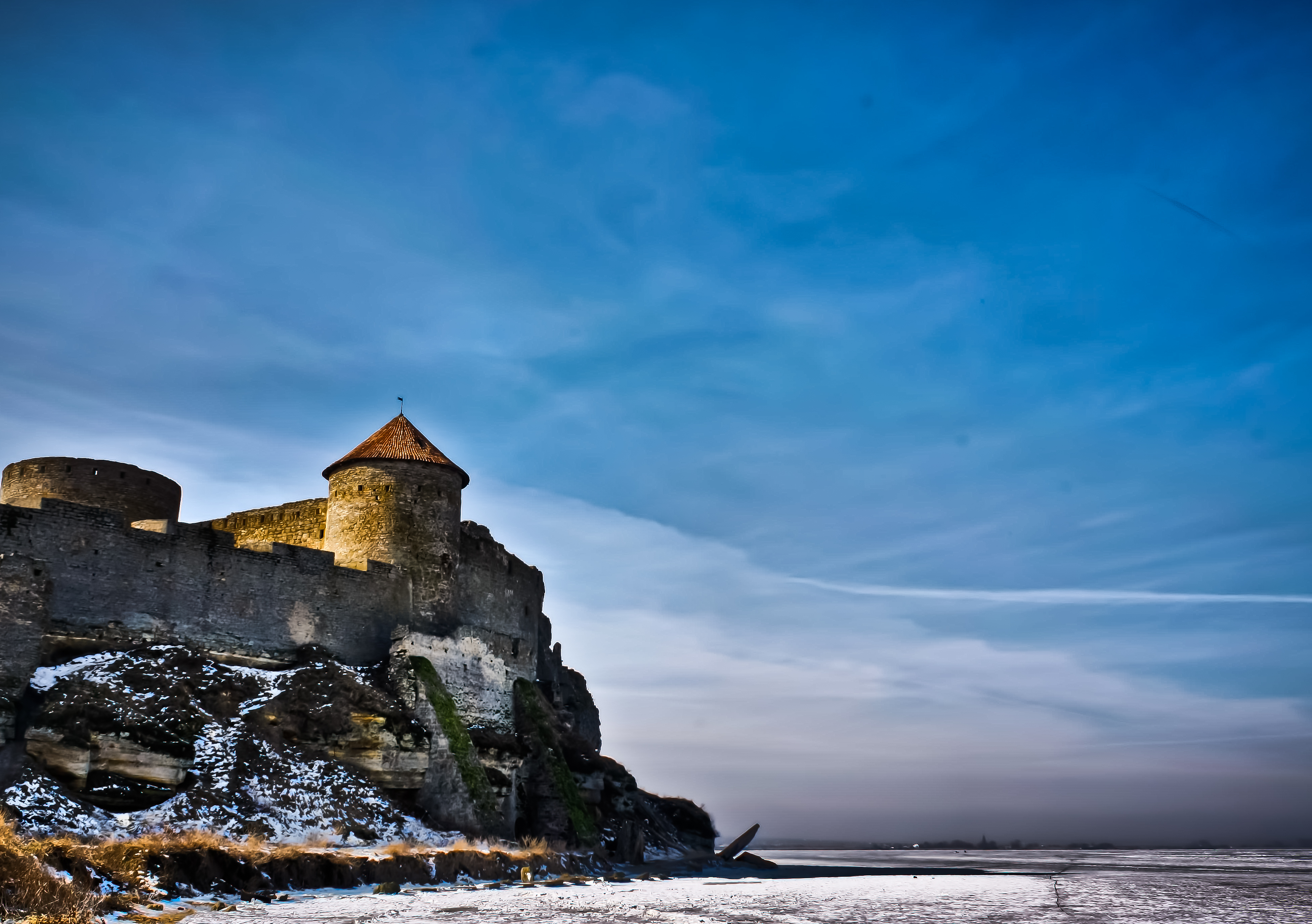
The Akkerman fortress in Bilhorod-Dnistrovskyi, Ukraine) was one of many important castles in Bessarabia.

In 1484, the Ottoman Empire invaded and captured Chilia and Cetatea Albă (Akkerman in Turkish), and annexed the shoreline southern part of Bessarabia, which was then divided into two sanjaks (districts) of the Ottoman Empire. In 1538, the Ottomans annexed more Bessarabian land in the south as far as Tighina, while the central and northern Bessarabia remained part of the Principality of Moldavia (which became a vassal of the Ottoman Empire). Between 1711 and 1812, the Russian Empire occupied the region five times during its wars against the Ottoman and Austrian Empires.

=== Annexation by the Russian Empire ===
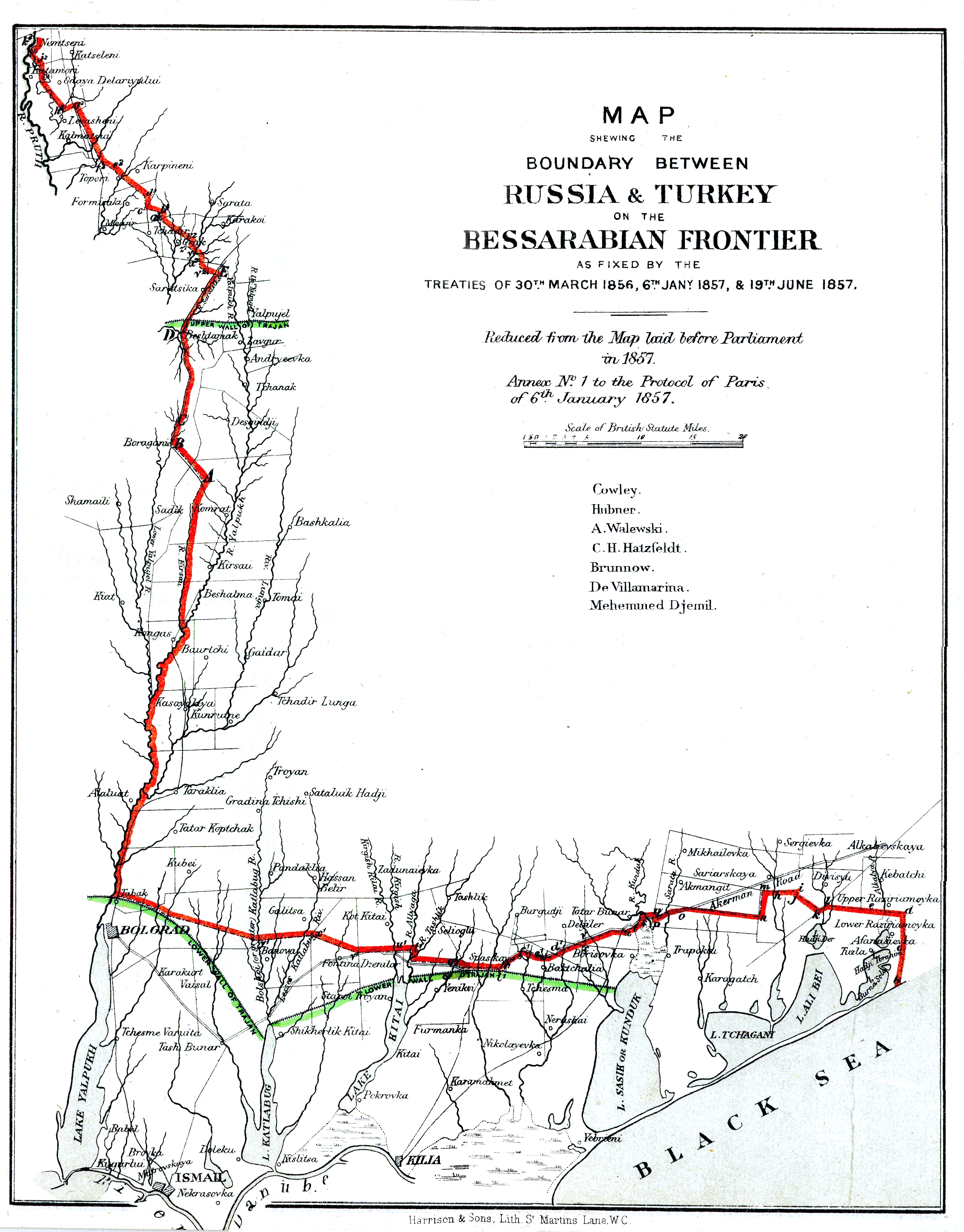
The Moldavian (later Romanian)–Russian boundary between 1856/1857 and 1878

By the Treaty of Bucharest of May 28, 1812 —concluding the Russo-Turkish War of 1806–1812— the Ottoman Empire ceded the land between the Pruth and the Dniester, including both Moldavian and Turkish territories, to the Russian Empire. That entire region was then called Bessarabia.

In 1814, the first German settlers arrived and mainly settled in the southern parts, and Bessarabian Bulgarians began settling in the region too, founding towns such as Bolhrad. Between 1812 and 1846, the Bulgarian and Gagauz population migrated to the Russian Empire via the River Danube, after living many years under oppressive Ottoman rule, and settled in southern Bessarabia. Turkic-speaking tribes of the Nogai horde also inhabited the Budjak Region (in Turkish Bucak) of southern Bessarabia from the 16th to 18th centuries but were totally driven out prior to 1812.

Administratively, Bessarabia became an oblast of the Russian Empire in 1818, and a guberniya in 1873.

The Treaty of Adrianople, which concluded the Russo-Turkish War of 1828–1829, stated that the entire Danube Delta would be ceded to the Bessarabian oblast. According to Vasile Stoica, emissary of the Romanian government to the United States, in 1834, Romanian was banned from schools and government facilities, despite 80% of the population speaking the language. This later lead to the banning of Romanian in churches, media, and books. According to the same author, those who protested the banning of Romanian could be sent to Siberia.

==== Southern Bessarabia returned to Moldavia ====
At the end of the Crimean War, in 1856, by the Treaty of Paris, Southern Bessarabia (organised as the Cahul and Ismail counties, with the Bolgrad county split from the latter in 1864) was returned to Moldavia, causing the Russian Empire to lose access to the Danube river. In 1859, Moldavia and Wallachia united to form the Romanian United Principalities, which included the southern part of Bessarabia.

The railway Chișinău–Iași was opened on June 1, 1875, in preparation for the Russo-Turkish War (1877–1878) and the Eiffel Bridge was opened on 21 April [O.S. 9 April] 1877, just three days before the outbreak of the war. The Romanian War of Independence was fought in 1877–78, with the help of the Russian Empire as an ally. Northern Dobruja was awarded to Romania for its role in the 1877–78 Russo-Turkish War, and as compensation for the transfer of Southern Bessarabia.

==== Early 20th century ====
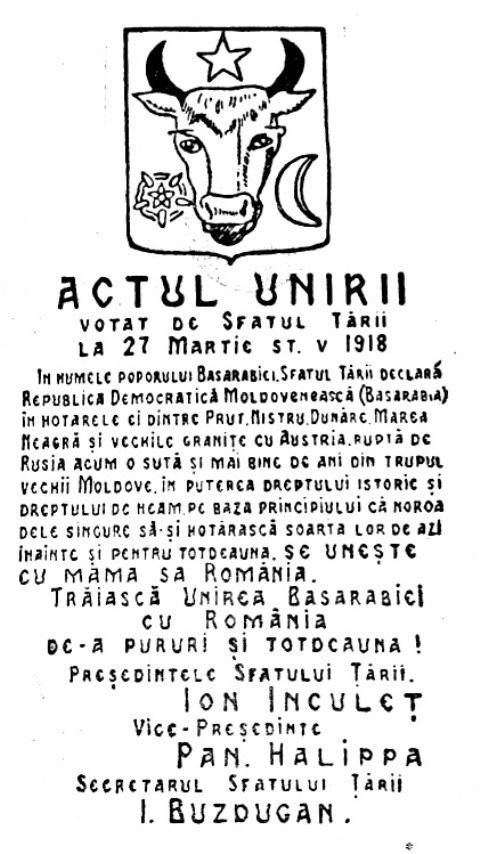
Declaration of unification of Romania and Bessarabia

The Kishinev pogrom took place in the capital of Bessarabia on April 6, 1903, after local newspapers published articles inciting the public to act against Jews; 47 or 49 Jews were killed, 92 severely wounded and 700 houses destroyed. The anti-Semitic newspaper Бессарабец (Bessarabetz, meaning "Bessarabian"), published by Pavel Krushevan, insinuated that local Jews killed a Russian boy. Another newspaper, Свет (Svet, "Light" or "World"), used the age-old blood libel against the Jews (alleging that the boy had been killed to use his blood in preparation of matzos).

After the 1905 Russian Revolution, a Romanian nationalist movement started to develop in Bessarabia. In the chaos brought by the Russian revolution of October 1917, a National Council (Sfatul Țării) was established in Bessarabia, with 120 members elected from Bessarabia by some political and professional organizations and 10 elected from Transnistria (the left bank of Dniester where Romanians accounted for half of the population, the rest being Russians and Ukrainians. See Demographics of Transnistria).

The Rumcherod Committee (Central Executive Committee of the Soviets of Romanian Front, Black Sea Fleet and Odesa Military District) proclaimed itself the supreme power in Bessarabia.

On the pretext of securing supply lines against raids by Bolsheviks and armed bandits, members of the Moldavian legislative council Sfatul Țării and the Entente Powers requested military assistance from Romania, and the Romanian Army crossed the republic's border on 23 January [O.S. 10 January] 1918; following several skirmishes with Moldovan and Bolshevik troops, the occupation of the whole region was completed in early March. The occupation of Bessarabia by the Romanians was not universally welcomed, and the members of the Bessarabian government denied that the Romanian troops had ever been invited to occupy the republic.

After Ukraine issued its Fourth Universal, breaking ties with Bolshevik Russia and proclaiming a sovereign Ukrainian state, Sfatul Țării declared Bessarabia's independence on 6 February [O.S. 24 January] 1918, as the Moldavian Democratic Republic.

=== Unification with Romania ===
On March 5 [O.S. 20 February] 1918, in a secret agreement signed along the Treaty of Buftea, the German Empire allowed Romania to annex Bessarabia in exchange for free passage of German troops toward Ukraine. The county councils of Bălți, Soroca and Orhei were the earliest to ask for unification of the Moldavian Democratic Republic with the Kingdom of Romania, and on April 9 [O.S. March 27] 1918, in the presence of the Romanian Army, The Country Council, called "Sfatul Țării", voted in favour of the union, with the following conditions:

1. The Country Council would undertake an agrarian reform, which the Romanian Government would accept.
2. Bessarabia would remain autonomous, with its own diet, the Country Council, elected democratically
3. The Country Council would vote for local budgets, control the councils of the zemstva and cities, and appoint the local administration
4. Conscription would be done on a territorial basis
5. Local laws and the form of administration could be changed only with the approval of local representatives
6. The rights of minorities had to be respected
7. Two Bessarabian representatives would be part of the Romanian government
8. Bessarabia would send to the Romanian Parliament a number of representatives equal to the proportion of its population
9. All elections must involve a direct, equal, secret, and universal vote
10. Freedom of speech and of belief must be guaranteed in the constitution
11. All individuals who had committed felonies for political reasons during the revolution would be amnestied.

86 deputies voted in support, three voted against and 36 abstained. The Romanian prime minister at the time, Alexandru Marghiloman, would later admit that the union was decided in Bucharest and Iași, the seats of the Romanian government.

The first condition, the agrarian reform, was debated and approved in November 1918. The Country Council also decided to remove the other conditions and made unification with Romania unconditional. The legality of this vote was considered highly debatable since the meeting had not been publicly announced, there was no quorum (only 44 of the 125 members took part in it, mostly Moldavian conservatives), and then the Country Council voted for its self-dissolution, preventing the protests of the Moldavians and minorities members who had not participated in the parliamentary session from being taken into account.

In the autumn of 1919, elections for the Romanian Constituent Assembly were held in Bessarabia; 90 deputies and 35 senators were chosen. On December 20, 1919, these men voted, along with the representatives of Romania's other regions, to ratify the unification acts that had been approved by the Country Council and the National Congresses in Transylvania and Bukovina.

The union was recognized by France, the United Kingdom, Italy, and Japan in the Treaty of Paris of 1920. However, the treaty never came into force, as Japan did not ratify it. The United States refused to sign the treaty on the grounds that Russia was not represented at the Conference. The US also considered Bessarabia a territory under Romanian occupation, rather than Romanian territory, despite existing political and economic relations between the US and Romania. Soviet Russia (and later, the USSR) did not recognize the union, and by 1924, after its demands for a regional plebiscite were declined by Romania for the second time, declared Bessarabia to be Soviet territory under foreign occupation. On all Soviet maps, Bessarabia was highlighted as a territory not belonging to Romania.

==== Aftermath ====
A Provisional Workers' & Peasants' Government of Bessarabia was founded on May 5, 1919, in exile at Odesa, by the Bolsheviks. On May 11, 1919, the Bessarabian Soviet Socialist Republic was proclaimed as an autonomous part of Russian SFSR, but was abolished by the military forces of Poland and France in September 1919 (see Polish–Soviet War). After the victory of Bolshevist Russia in the Russian Civil War, the Ukrainian SSR was created in 1922, and in 1924 the Moldavian Autonomous Soviet Socialist Republic was established on a strip of Ukrainian land on the west bank of Dniester where Moldovans and Romanians accounted for less than a third and the relative majority of the population was Ukrainian.

=== Part of Romania ===
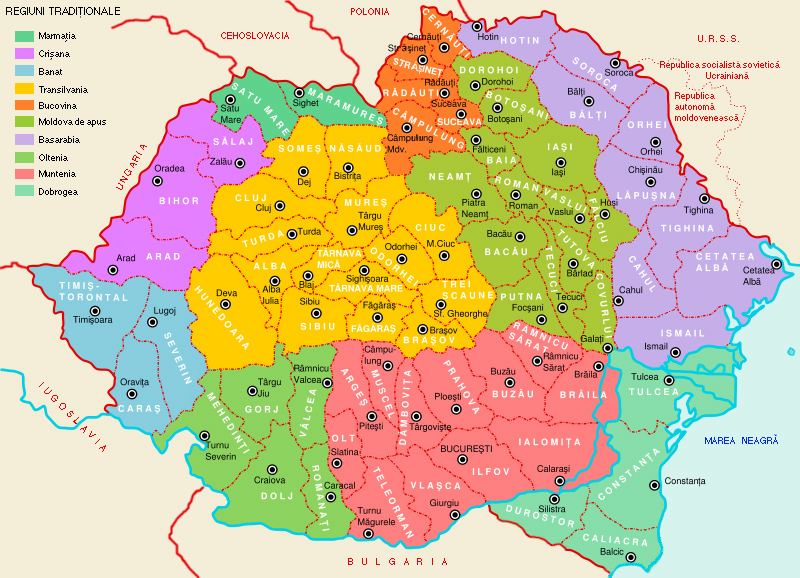
Bessarabia (pale purple) and the other historical regions of Romania between 1918 and 1940

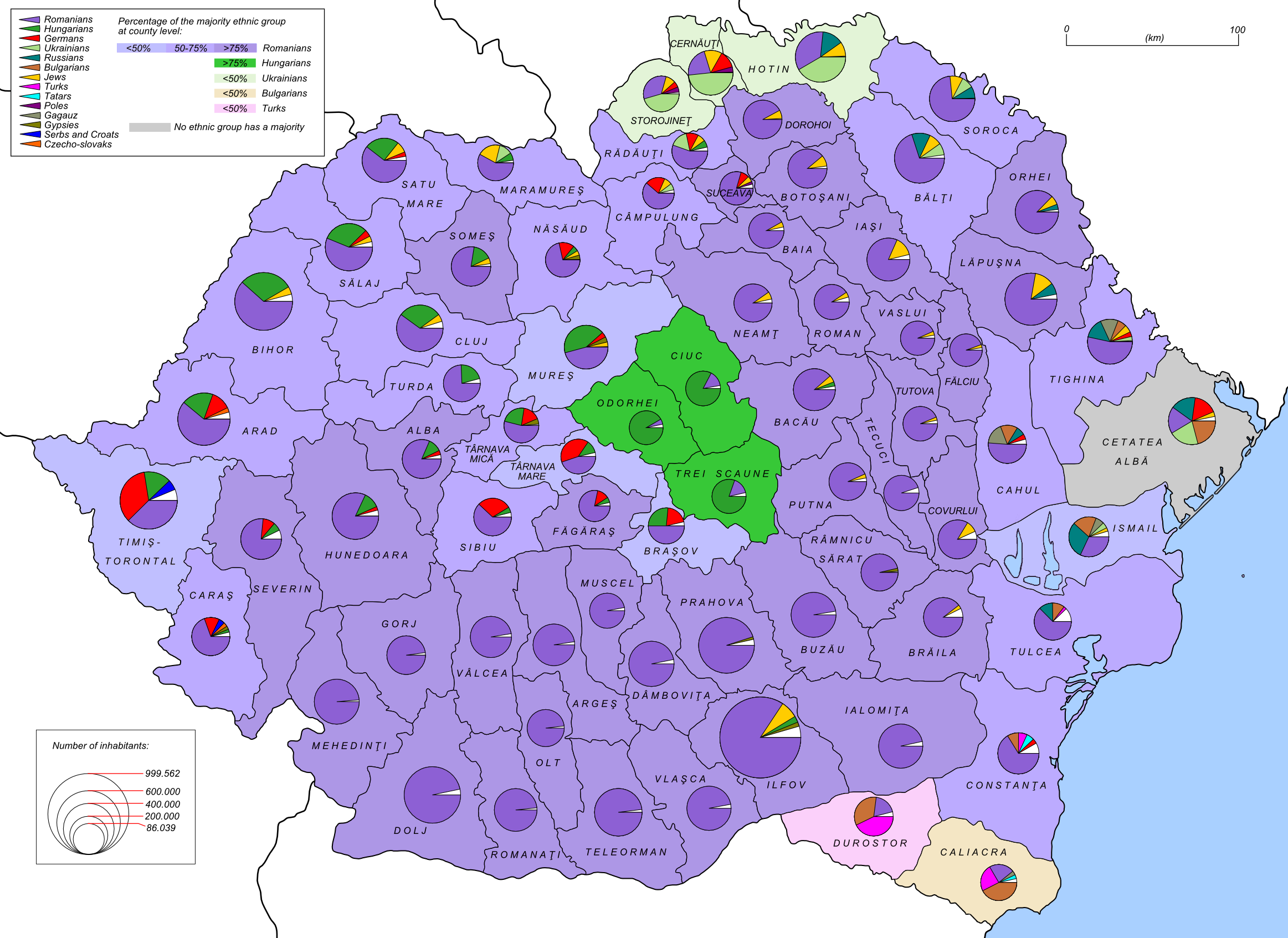
Ethnic map of the Kingdom of Romania per the 1930 census

==== Historiography ====
Svetlana Suveică considers that historical discourse regarding interwar Bessarabia was heavily influenced by the political association of the authors, and sought mainly to argue for or against the legality of Romanian rule in Bessarabia. The impact of the various reforms on the progress of the province was mostly ignored.

Romanian historiography, for the most part, consistently sought to demonstrate the legitimacy of the regime established after the Union of Bessarabia with Romania. During the interwar period, Romanian historians countered Soviet historians' description of it as the establishment of an "occupation regime". The agrarian reform, considered one of the most radical in Europe (an idea also supported by Western historians), was appreciated as having a positive role, emphasizing the national emancipation of the Romanian peasantry, while the modernization of agriculture was presented as a complex phenomenon, which also required further mechanism to support the new owner. However, agriculture was ignored by the state, and the new owners were greatly affected by the lack of credit, Romanian authors of the time suggested various ways this situation could have been overcome. Ultimately, as the state failed to create an adequate agricultural policy, by the end of the 1920 authors were hoping progress could be made through private initiative. Romanian authors also paid particular attention to the unification of administrative legislation, norms, and principles of administrative law, as well as their application in Romanian practice. The institute of the zemstvo was regarded by some of them as the most democratic form of government, and its dissolution by the Romanian authorities was deplored; authors such as Onisifor Ghibu expressed a critical view on the relation between Romanian administrative personnel from outside Bessarabia and the locals, as well as the general structure of the administrative corps.

During the Communist period, Romanian historians initially treated the reforms applied after World War I mainly from social class perspectives. Starting with the 1960s, the first studies that mentioned the existence of a "Bessarabian historical problem" appeared. From the second half of the 1970s, studies on the agrarian reform considered that while this led to a "natural and rational distribution of agricultural property", it also led to fragmentation of agricultural land. This made the practice of intensive agriculture difficult, since peasants had reduced opportunity to purchase agricultural equipment. Towards the end of the Communist period, the two interwar concepts of development and modernization were re-embraced.

After the fall of Communism, Romanian historiography treated Bessarabia mainly in the context of Romanian nation-building, seen as the main issue affecting Greater Romania; authors focused mainly on issues related to the general and specific context of Bessarabia after the Union, the state's efforts for social-political and economic integration, and cultural development of Bessarabia. The internal and external factors that determined the specifics of the province's integration into the Romanian common framework are also of interest. Romanian authors mainly blamed the lasting effects of Russian domination and the destabilizing role of Soviet Russia (USSR) for the malfunctioning of the Romanian administration, with some also pointing to the difficult and non-uniform character of the integration generated by the non-uniform character of the development of the provinces until 1918, of a different degree of their adaptability to the new conditions. The modernization interwar period is also seen as the third phase of a continuous process, begun in the eighteenth and nineteenth centuries and brutally interrupted by the establishment of Communism. In this context, some authors consider the comparative studies of the interwar and post-Communist periods in different fields as particularly current.

Soviet historiography considered the changes that took place in interwar Bessarabia expressed were directed either towards strengthening the political, economical, and social position of the bourgeoisie, to the detriment of the peasantry, or towards creating a favourable position for the Romanian population, to the detriment of the national minorities; Soviet authors thus reportedly rejected the notion that any modernization and progress took place in the region during Romanian rule. The transformations that took place on different levels of the Bessarabian society at that time were treated from a social class and/or ethnopolitical positions; Svetlana Suveică states "the writings from the Soviet period, directly determined by the interference of politics in historical science, alternated the ideas regarding the "Moldovan" nation and the national identity, with severe condemnations of the Romanian interwar period". In Suveică's opinion, the conception of Soviet historiography was based on distorted facts that would serve as "indisputable arguments" for the establishment of an illegal "occupation" regime. According to Wim P. van Meurs "the legitimation of the political regime has been the main function of (the Soviet) historiography and such a legitimation has usually been based on a number of historical myths". The discussion of the social-economic and politico-administrative situation in the region was also closely related to the Romanian-Soviet conflictual relations of the 1960s and 1970s, during which both communist countries treated the Bessarabian problem for political purposes.

The presence of the ideological factor in writing the history of Bessarabia was manifested itself not only at the central level, but also at the level of the historiography of Soviet Moldavia. It was not until the second half of the '80s that the Moldovan historiography raised the issue of the Soviet political and ideological pressures.

After the dissolution of the Soviet Union, the Moldovan historiography, largely marked by the public identity discourse, deals with the problems of the interwar Bessarabian history, depending on the context. On the one hand, the supporters of the idea of Moldovan statehood reject the option of modernization and progress of Bessarabia after the Union with Romania while, on the other hand, the historians who, starting from the idea of the Romanian character of Bessarabia, and using new sources, "contribute to the in-depth knowledge of the integrating and modernizing processes that marked the history of the (Bessarabian) land in the interwar period". This ongoing controversy highlights the two antagonistic geopolitical tendencies present in the contemporary Moldovan historiography: the pro-East current versus the pro-West current.

The Western historiography pointed out that the reforms at the beginning of Romania's rule were mainly directed at easing the social tensions existing across Eastern Europe and were, therefore, similar to the ones taking place elsewhere in the region. In the case of the agrarian reform, G. Clenton Logio states that the Romanians were pressed into legislating it, as expropriation had begun before the Union and there was the danger that Bessarabians would undo this act; he notes that no planning took place regarding the effects of the reform and the problems of the peasantry were ignored, transforming the latter in "a numerous and profitable mass of clients for the banks". According to the analysis Western authors, the reform only changed the distribution of the land, and not agricultural policies; as a result of the economical and social policies of the Romanian governments, small and medium-sized farms remained unprofitable, while the large farms not affected by the reform also lost their economic role. Western authors also criticized the administrative corps of Bessarabia-"an unstable and corrupt stratum"-observing that transfer of administrative personnel from Romania to Bessarabia was regarded as a severe punishment, and the clerks affected generally sought personal enrichment; the local administration was also considered rigid and unwilling to reform. In general, Western historiography analyzed the modernization of Bessarabia in a general Romanian context in relation to the previous Russian period, as well as the uneven and not so fast modernization process, determined by both internal and external factors.

==== Overview ====
According to Vladimir Solonar and Vladimir Bruter, Bessarabia under Romanian rule experienced low population growth due to high mortality (highest in Romania and one of the highest in Europe) as well as emigration; Bessarabia was also characterized by economic stagnation and high unemployment. Access to social services declined after the abolition of the zemstvos in the early 1920s, as these had previously provided local autonomy in managing education and public health. In the late 1930s, the Bessarabian population had among the highest incidences of several major infectious diseases and some of the highest mortality rates from these diseases.

According to Dan Dungaciu, the only European modernization process of Bessarabia was carried out during the Romanian interwar period, despite the all unfavorable domestic and international conditions (post-war recession, actions backed by the Soviet Union, worldwide Great Depression). Gheorghe Duca considers that, in terms of science, economy, art, political and social life, Bessarabia made considerable progress in the interwar period.

Nicolae Enciu appreciates that through the political, social-economic, and cultural modernization, the interwar period meant a progress of the Romanian society, with beneficial effects in all its historical regions. At the same time, the interwar period also experienced failures, being too short to be able to produce radical transformations, in order to reduce the economic and social polarization.

==== Politics ====
According to Wim P. van Meurs, after 1918 Bessarabia remained for a long time in a state of emergency, under a military administration, due to border incidents and agitation among the peasantry and the minorities. Strict censorship was imposed in order to restrain Bolshevik propaganda. Three major revolts or Soviet raids took place in the province during the first decade of Romanian rule. In January 1919, local peasants, with support from across the Dniester, rebelled against the Romanian army in the area of Hotin. A similar uprising took place later that year in Tighina. While in the first case Soviet participation is not documented, the latter was probably a Soviet raid, though van Meurs indicates it was most likely a local initiative not coordinated with the central government in Moscow. The longest-lasting rebellion took place for several weeks in 1924 in the area of Tatarbunary when the local population was instigated by agitators from the Soviet Union and proclaimed a Bessarabian Soviet Republic. In all cases, the rebellions were brutally suppressed by the Romanian army, which at times fielded artillery against the rebels.

According to Anatol Petrencu, during most of the Romanian period, Bessarabia benefited by democracy, with a multiparty and a modern electoral system, based on the 1923 Constitution and laws. In November 1919, Romania elected the first post-war parliament based on the proportional representation of the mandates according to the number of the population. As of mid 1919, the population of Bessarabia was estimated at 2 million. With a voter turnout of 72.2%, the Bessarabians elected and sent to the Romanian Parliament 90 deputies and 37 senators.

According to Charles King, in Romania "the budding democracy [...] was soon crushed beneath the weight of corruption, court intrigues, and right-wing reaction". The same author notes that corrupt and heavy-handed Romanian administrators were especially prevalent in the region, and the Siguranța, the Romanian secret police, conducted extensive surveillance among the minorities and regarded Transnistrian refugees and Bessarabian students as potential Bolshevik agents. This resulted in "a sense among locals that Bessarabia had been occupied by Romania rather than united with". Russians, in particular, were regarded as "Bolsheviks in disguise", with their churches and libraries closed down or Romanianized.

==== Economy ====
At the beginning of World War I, around 80% of the population worked in agriculture. While the Sfatul Țării envisioned distributing land freely to the peasants, Romanian pressure resulted in a significant modification of the plans, bringing the reform more in line with similar ones taking place in the Old Kingdom and Transylvania. While more radical than elsewhere, as it provided lower payments, lower limits for land exempt from expropriation and larger plots, the Romanian land reform also reverted some of the ad-hoc land distribution that had taken place during the Russian Revolution, raising discontent among the peasantry. Thus, of the 1.5 million dessiatin (40% of the agricultural land) held by the large landowners in 1917, more than one third (38.6%) was distributed to peasants, another third was restored to its previous owners, while the rest became state property and was to a large degree later awarded to officers of the Romanian army, officials and clergy. A significant number of plots were awarded to Romanians immigrants from Wallachia and Western Moldavia, while Romanian offices who married Bessarabian women were eligible to receive 100 hectares. Though the reform set the lot at 6 hectares, more than two-thirds of the peasant households received less than 5 hectares each, and, as of 1931, 367.8 thousand peasant families were still landless. The average size of the peasant household further dropped after the land reform due to land division among heirs.

According to Alla Skvortsova, while the reform stimulated the development of commodity farming in the countryside and expanded the market for industrial products, it failed to produce the expected results. The peasants had to pay for the land they received during the following 20 years, there was little to no state support provided for them to acquire technical equipment required for the development of successful farms and credit was only accessible to the more prosperous among them and therefore insignificant overall. The region also lacked qualified specialists and lagged behind in infrastructure, as the government had few resources and other priorities. The main factors which impeded the creation of a prosperous peasant class were the payments for land redemption, peasant debts, and taxes, lack of access to the traditional Russian market, difficulties to break into the Romanian and European agricultural market and frequent droughts (1921, 1924, 1925, 1927–28 and 1935). Winemaking, one of the mainstays of the local economy, was particularly affected by the external policy of the Romanian state: the most favoured nation status awarded to France brought inexpensive French wine to the local market, access to the Soviet market was blocked, while exports to the traditional markets in Poland were hindered by the trade war started in 1926.

According to Alla Skvortsova, the peasant situation was further aggravated by the Great Depression in Romania, with prices for agricultural products dropping catastrophically and not recovering until the end of the decade. While only 2.8% of the national agricultural credit was directed by the National Bank of Romania towards Bessarabia in 1936, by 1940 70% of the peasants were in debt to the large landowners and moneylenders. In order to pay debts, many of the poorer peasants had to sell their livestock and even their land. Failure to pay the redemption payments for 2.5 years also resulted in the land reverting to state property; thus, by 1938, in the district of Soroca only a quarter of the peasant households had retained their allotment. By 1939 farms of up to 5 hectares throughout the region had lost a seventh of their land, while farms with more than 10 hectares had increased their land by 26%. According to a study of the new Soviet administration, in June 1940 7.3% of the peasant households in the Bessarabian regions of the Moldavian SSR were completely landless, 38.15% had up to 3 hectares (an average of 1.7 hectares per lot) and 22.4% had 3 to 5 hectares (an average of 2.6 hectares per one household), i.e. more than two-thirds of the peasant households were farm laborers and poor peasants.

Better off was the middle peasantry, which owned 5 to 10 hectares, and constituted 22.73% of peasant farms. The rest, constituting 9.4% of the farms, owned more than 10 hectares each, but held under their control 36% of peasant land, i.e. more than all small farms taken together. The 818 large landowners held an average of 100 hectares each, while institutional owners (the state, churches, and monasteries) held another 59 thousand hectares. About 54% of peasant households had no livestock, about two-thirds had no horse, a little more than a sixth had one horse each, and only 13.2% had two or more working horses. In the whole of Bessarabian region of the Moldavian SSR there were at the beginning of Soviet administration only 219 obsolete tractors, mostly owned by larger farms and used primarily as threshing engines. With little serviceable equestrian equipment, tillage, sowing, and harvesting of all crops were mostly carried out manually. Throughout the interwar era, Bessarabia witnessed several negative phenomena: further social stratification in the countryside, deepening poverty, lowering yields, worsening of the structure of crops grown, reduction of the total agricultural production. The number of cattle fell by 26% between 1926 and 1938, the number of sheep by 5%, the number of pigs by 14%. Average grain yield also decreased from 1920/1925 to 1935/1939 from 850 kg per hectare to 800 kg. The area used in wine-making grew by 15,000 hectares between 1930 and 1938. However, wine quality dropped, as slightly over 80% of the vineyards were planted with lower quality grape varieties. According to V.I. Tsaranov, adding to the lack of land, small plots, poor crop yields, unemployment was also high among rural residents, with around 550 thousand recorded in June 1940.

According to Alla Skvortsova, the Romanian government, either directly or through the banking system, encouraged the development of industry in the areas of prewar Romania, while hindering the process in new territories. As a consequence, even Bessarabian entrepreneurs preferred to invest their capital in those areas instead of using it within the region. Local industry faced fierce competition from larger Romanian companies, which had access to preferential rail tariffs, limited credit to local entrepreneurs, and flooded the local market with cheaper industrial goods produced in Romania or imported from abroad. Nevertheless, some new small-scale industrial enterprises were established in the 1920s, using primarily local raw materials and producing for the local market. The total engine power rose from 7.8 thousand hp in 1925 to 12.2 thousand in 1929. Although the number of industrial enterprises more than doubled after 1918, small semi-handicraft production prevailed, seldom using hired labor: in 1930 there were an average of only 2.4 employees per enterprise. During the 22 years of Romanian rule, only one large enterprise was built in Bessarabia: the Bălți sugar plant.

According to Alla Skvortsova, not all new enterprises survived for long, and the Great Depression had a particularly strong impact on the region, many of the companies going bankrupt or closing in 1929–1933. Governmental policy, influenced by the banking system and the industrial cartels, prevented a rebound, the industry of the Old Kingdom again receiving preferential treatment. The main factors that affected the development of Bessarabia in the 1930s were severe credit restrictions, increases in transport tariffs and customs restrictions, and special tax policies. The tax burden was notably high, with enterprises required to fully provide the assigned tax agent with housing, heating, lighting, and office space. Bessarabia was reduced mostly to a supplier of raw materials and a market for industrial goods of Romanian or foreign origin.

By the end of the 1930s, the only industrial sectors that managed to rebound were the food and woodworking industries, the rest witnessing either stagnation or a decrease compared to pre-Depression levels. Most industrial facilities in the food industry worked significantly below their installed capacity even in prosperous years such as 1937. Several large factories, such as the Basarabeasca, Cetatea Albă, Florești and Tighina, railway workshops, the Cetatea Albă and Chișinău textile and knitwear factories and the Cetatea Albă canning factory and distillery were dismantled and relocated to the Old Kingdom by 1938. Between 1929 and 1937, fixed capital in the industry dropped by 10%, and the number of industrial workers in Bessarabia dropped from 5,400 in 1925 to 3,500 in 1937, while their overall number in Romania had increased by almost 27% during the same period. Between 1926 and 1937 the share of the food industry in the total production of large manufacturing industries increased from 77.1% to 92.4%, with sharp decreases observed in sectors with higher added value, such as the metalworking, textile and leather processing industries. Even so, the food industry failed to fulfill local needs; most industries heavily relied on manual labor and primitive technologies. Electricity production in Chișinău, Bessarabia's center and Romania's second-largest city, recorded in 1925 at 4.47 million kWh, only increased by 6.7% during the following decade, lagging far behind other Romanian cities: 572.3% in Galați, 238.2% in Bucharest, and over 101% in Iași. By the end of the 1930s, only one in seven Bessarabians had access to electricity, compared to one in four among the general Romanian population.

The Romanian administration carried out many projects aimed at improving the infrastructure of the province to introduce European gauge and reorient it towards Romania. The total length of the railway lines in Bessarabia increased only by 78 km (from 1140 in 1918 to 1218 in 1940). Local businessmen remained dissatisfied with the pace of the construction of new railways (the Chișinău-Căinari was the only one built anew) and the closure of a number of lines. Road infrastructure was also improved, as new highways and bridges over the Prut were built, while part of the existing roads were repaired and paved, increasing the length of highways from 150 to 754 km. However, most other roads remained impassable during rainy periods. Shipping on the Dniester was closed, and was never established on the Prut. In the 1930s, new airports were built, telephone lines were laid out, and radio transmitters were installed; nevertheless, the region still lagged behind Transylvania and the Old Kingdom.

According to Alla Skvortsova, overall, the share of Bessarabian enterprises in the Romanian industry fell between 1919 and 1937 from 9% to 5.7%, while the number of enterprises employing at least 20 employees dropping from 262 to 196. The share of investments in Bessarabian industry also fell from 0.3% in 1923 to 0.1% in 1936. Sociologist T. Al. Știrbu observed, commenting on the Romanian government's apparent long-term economical plans, that "Bessarabia can only be considered as a reserve of labor and cheap bread for the industry of the rest of the country". In a 1938 review, the Bessarabian Federation of Chambers of Commerce noted that "the decline in industrial production in Bessarabia hinders the rational processing of local raw materials, thereby turning our province into a colony for industry in the rest of the country". According to V.I. Tsaranov, throughout the period, industrial workers in the region faced long working hours (up to fourteen per day), lack of proper safety measures, unsanitary conditions, the perspective of unemployment and a general decrease in the standard of living: the real wage of a Chișinău worker dropped 60% between 1913 and 1937.

==== Education ====
In 1919, Bessarabia became the Romanian region with the highest illiteracy rate. Although the Romanian/Moldovan population was the largest, no Romanian language school operated in Bessarabia before 1918. As a result, among them, only 10.5% of men and 1.77% of women were literate. By 1930, although Bessarabia continued to be the region with the most illiterate people in Romania, the number of literates doubled, to 38,1% of the total population. In the 1920-1938 period, the number of primary schools increased from 1,747 to 2,718, and the number of students from 136,172 to 346,747. In 1940, there were also 24 gymnasiums and middle schools and 26 high schools. Despite a large number of minorities (over 870,000 Russians, Ukrainians, and Jews), education in minority languages was curtailed: private schools were allowed to function after 1925 only if the instruction was in Romanian and, by 1938, there were no state- sponsored Russian or Ukrainian schools and only one each in private hands. In 1939, after the German and Soviet attacks on Poland, the government reverted on its earlier policy and decided to reintroduce minority language classes in state schools and allow a greater degree of cultural expression for the Slavic minorities, in an effort to improve its image among the local population.

Also, during the interwar period, the foundations were laid for the first higher education institutions in Bessarabia. In 1926, the Faculty of Theology was established in Chișinău, followed by the National Conservatory in 1928, and the Faculty of Agricultural Sciences in 1933. The two faculties were sections of the University of Iași, in pre-war Romania.

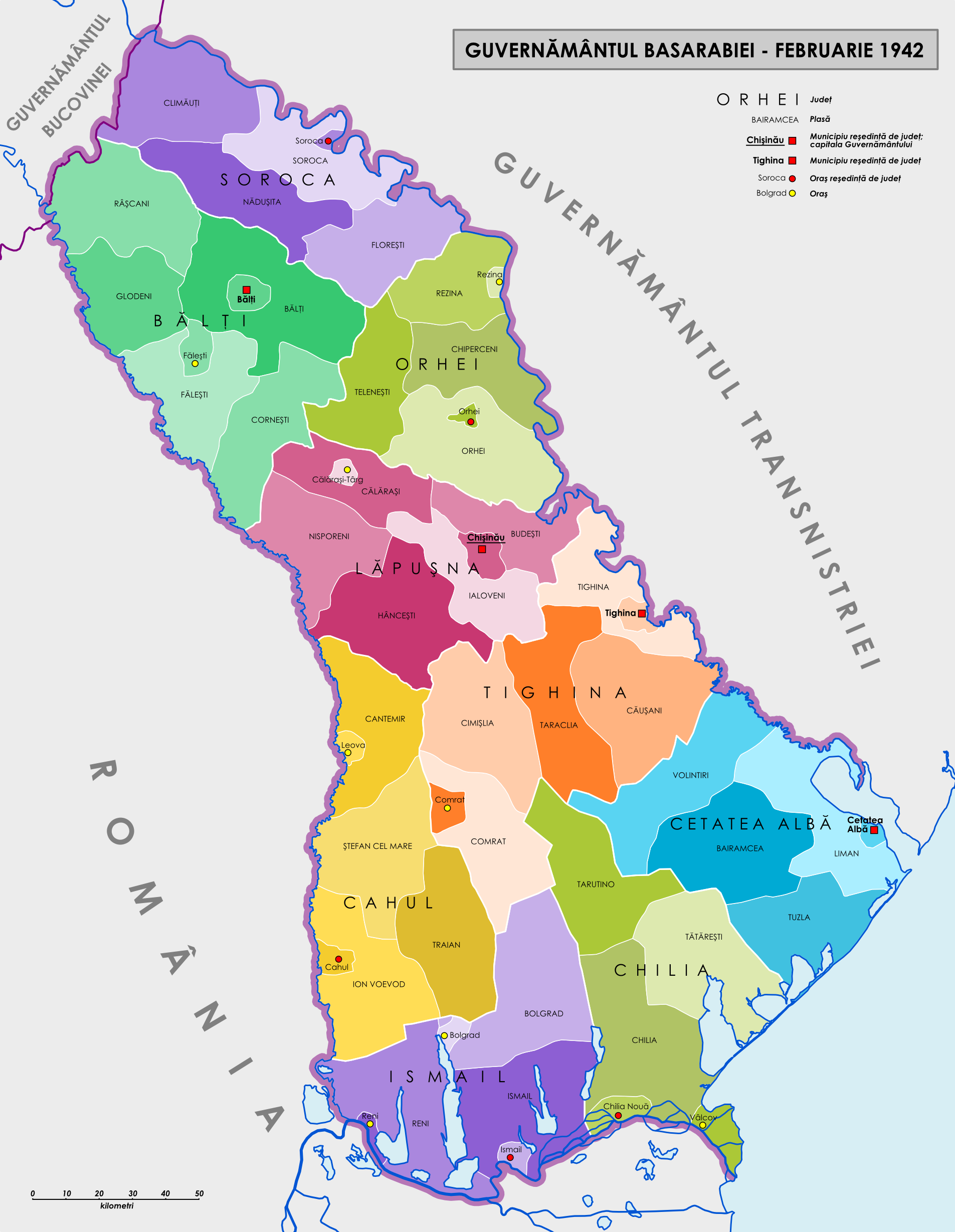
Administrative map of the Bessarabia Governorate in February 1942

=== World War II ===
The Soviet Union did not recognize the incorporation of Bessarabia into Romania and throughout the entire interwar period engaged in attempts to undermine Romania and diplomatic disputes with the government in Bucharest over this territory. The Molotov–Ribbentrop Pact was signed on August 23, 1939. By Article 4 of the secret Annex to the Treaty, Nazi Germany recognized Bessarabia as belonging to the Soviet "sphere of interest".

In the spring of 1940, Western Europe was overrun by Germany. With world attention focused on those events, on June 26, 1940, the USSR issued a 24-hour ultimatum to Romania, demanding immediate cession of Bessarabia and Northern Bukovina under threat of war. Romania was given four days to evacuate its troops and officials. The two provinces had an area of 51,000 km^{2} (20,000 sq mi), and were inhabited by about 3.75 million people, half of them Romanians, according to official Romanian sources. Two days later, Romania yielded and began evacuation. During the evacuation, from June 28 to July 3, groups of local Communists and Soviet sympathizers attacked the retreating forces and civilians who chose to leave. Many members of the minorities (Jews, ethnic Ukrainians and others) joined in these attacks. The Romanian Army was also attacked by the Soviet Army, which entered Bessarabia before the Romanian administration finished retreating. The casualties reported by the Romanian Army during those seven days consisted of 356 officers and 42,876 soldiers dead or missing.

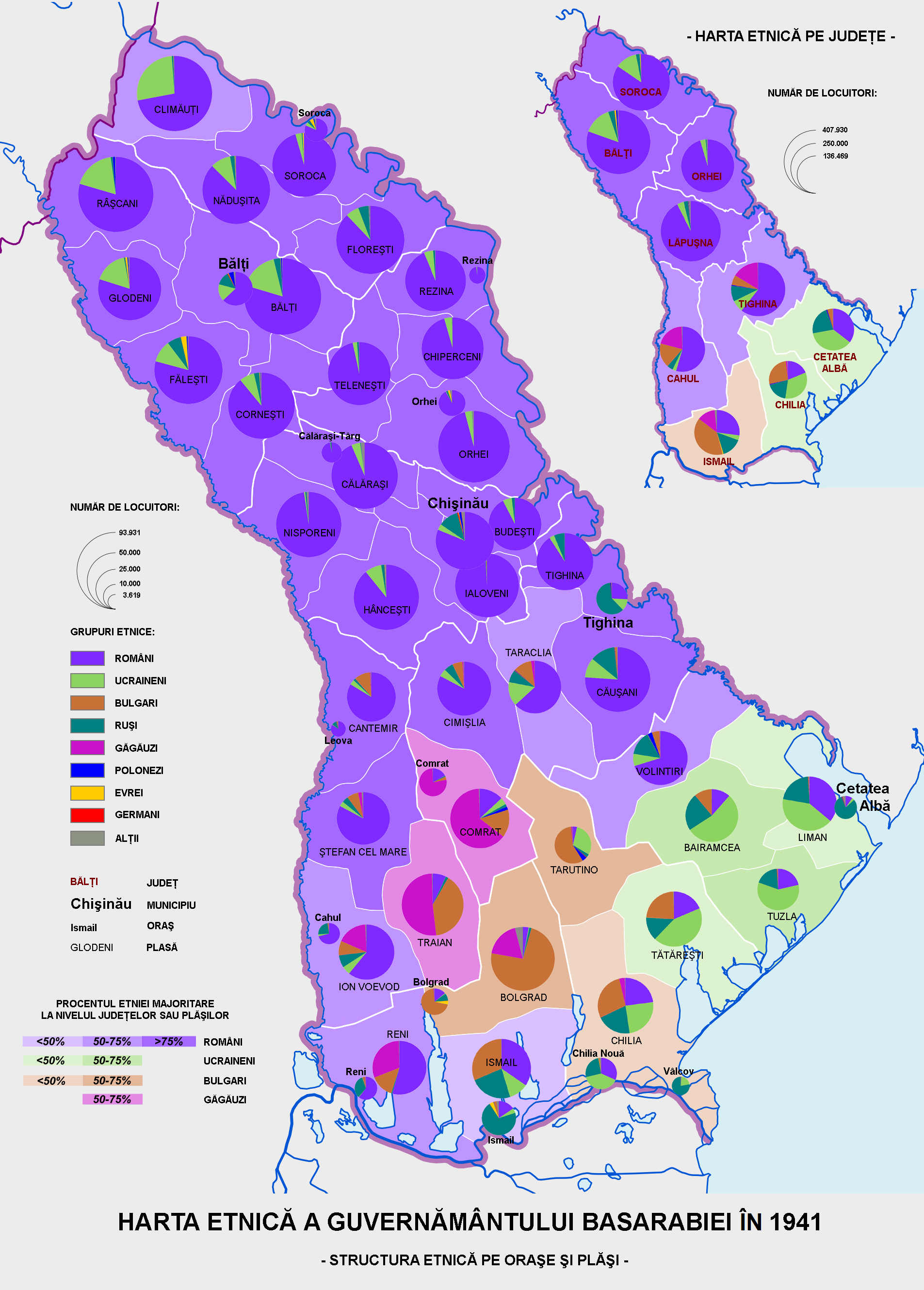
Ethnic composition of the Bessarabia Governorate according to the 1941 census, after the Romanian authorities had "cleansed" the Jewish population

On August 2, the Moldavian Soviet Socialist Republic was established on most of the territory of Bessarabia, merged with the western parts of the former Moldavian ASSR. Bessarabia was divided between the Moldavian SSR (65% of the territory and 80% of the population) and the Ukrainian SSR. Bessarabia's northern and southern districts (now Budjak and parts of the Chernivtsi oblast) were allotted to Ukraine, while some territories (4,000 km^{2}) on the left (eastern) bank of Dniester (present Transnistria), previously part of Ukraine, were allotted to Moldavia. After the Soviet takeover, many Bessarabians, who were accused of supporting the deposed Romanian administration, were executed or deported to Siberia and Kazakhstan. The total number of deportees from Soviet Moldova to Siberia in June 1941 was 31,699, while 8,374 (mostly Romanians) were deported from the Chernivtsi oblast of Ukraine and 3,767 from the Izmail oblast of Ukraine (southern Bessarabia); the total was 43,840. According to Nikolai Bougai, only 22,643 individuals deported from Soviet Moldova (71.43%) were still alive in September 1941, and out of those deported from the Chernivtsi and Izmail oblasts, only 9,595 (79.03%) were still alive at that time. Only 1,136 of those deported from the Izmail oblast (30.16%) were still alive in 1951. The number of deportees to the Soviet north and east from the present-day Hertsa raion of the Chernivtsi oblast on June 13, 1941, was 1996; according to some sources, most of the deportees died. According to some sources, most of the deportees of June 1941 of all ethnicities from the Chernivtsi oblast died in the Soviet east. According to Dr. Avigdor Schachan, who wrote a book about the Transnistrian ghettos, and was himself brought up in the Bessarabian part of the present-day Chernivtsi Oblast of Ukraine, about 2,000 northern Bukovinian and 4,000 Bessarabian Jews were deported to the Soviet east in June 1941. About half of the Jews deported from Bessarabia to the Soviet east survived and returned to Bessarabia, and the rest died, according to a source mentioned by Jean Ancel, the specialist on the Holocaust in Romania and Transnistria.

Between September and November 1940, the ethnic Germans of Bessarabia were offered resettlement to Germany, following a German-Soviet agreement. Fearing Soviet oppression, almost all Germans (93,000) agreed. Most of them were resettled to the newly annexed Polish territories.

On June 22, 1941, the Axis invasion of the Soviet Union commenced with Operation Barbarossa. Between June 22 and July 26, 1941, Romanian troops recovered Bessarabia and northern Bukovina with the help of Wehrmacht. The Soviets employed scorched earth tactics during their forced retreat from Bessarabia, destroying the infrastructure and transporting movable goods to Russia by railway. At the end of July, after a year of Soviet rule, the region was once again under Romanian control, being organized as the Bessarabia Governorate.

As the military operation was still in progress, there were cases of Romanian troops "taking revenge" on Jews in Bessarabia, in the form of pogroms on civilians and murder of Jewish POWs, resulting in several thousand dead. The supposed cause for murdering Jews was that in 1940 some Jews welcomed the Soviet takeover as liberation. At the same time the notorious SS Einsatzgruppe D, operating in the area of the German 11th Army, committed summary executions of Jews under the pretext that they were spies, saboteurs, Communists, or under no pretext whatsoever.

The political solution of the "Jewish Question" was apparently seen by the Romanian dictator Marshal Ion Antonescu more in expulsion rather than extermination. That portion of the Jewish population of Bessarabia and Bukovina which did not flee before the retreat of the Soviet troops (147,000) was initially gathered into ghettos or Nazi concentration camps, and then deported during 1941–1942 in death marches into Romanian-occupied Transnistria, where the "Final Solution" was applied.

After three years of relative peace, the German-Soviet front returned in 1944 to the land border on the Dniester. On August 20, 1944, a c. 3,400,000-strong Red Army began a major summer offensive codenamed Second Jassy–Kishinev offensive. The Soviet armies overran Bessarabia in a two-pronged offensive within five days. In pocket battles at Chișinău and Sărata the German 6th Army of c. 650,000 men, newly reformed after the Battle of Stalingrad, was obliterated. Simultaneously with the success of the Russian attack, Romania broke the military alliance with the Axis and changed sides. On August 23, 1944, Marshal Ion Antonescu was arrested by King Michael, and later handed over to the Soviets.

=== Part of the Soviet Union ===
Moldavian SSR (in red) as part of the Soviet Union (yellow)

The Soviet Union regained the region in 1944, and the Red Army occupied Romania. By 1947, the Soviets had imposed a communist government in Bucharest, which was friendly and obedient towards Moscow. The Soviet occupation of Romania lasted until 1958. The Romanian communist regime did not openly raise the matter of Bessarabia or Northern Bukovina in its diplomatic relations with the Soviet Union. At least 100,000 people died in a post-war famine in Moldavia.

Between 1969 and 1971, a clandestine National Patriotic Front was established by several young intellectuals in Chișinău, totaling over 100 members, vowing to fight for the establishment of a Moldavian Democratic Republic, its secession from the Soviet Union and union with Romania.

In December 1971, following an informative note from Ion Stănescu, the President of the Council of State Security of the Romanian Socialist Republic, to Yuri Andropov, the chief of KGB, three of the leaders of the National Patriotic Front, Alexandru Usatiuc-Bulgar, Gheorghe Ghimpu and Valeriu Graur, as well as a fourth person, Alexandru Soltoianu, the leader of a similar clandestine movement in northern Bukovina (Bucovina), were arrested and later sentenced to long prison terms.

=== Rise of independent Moldova ===
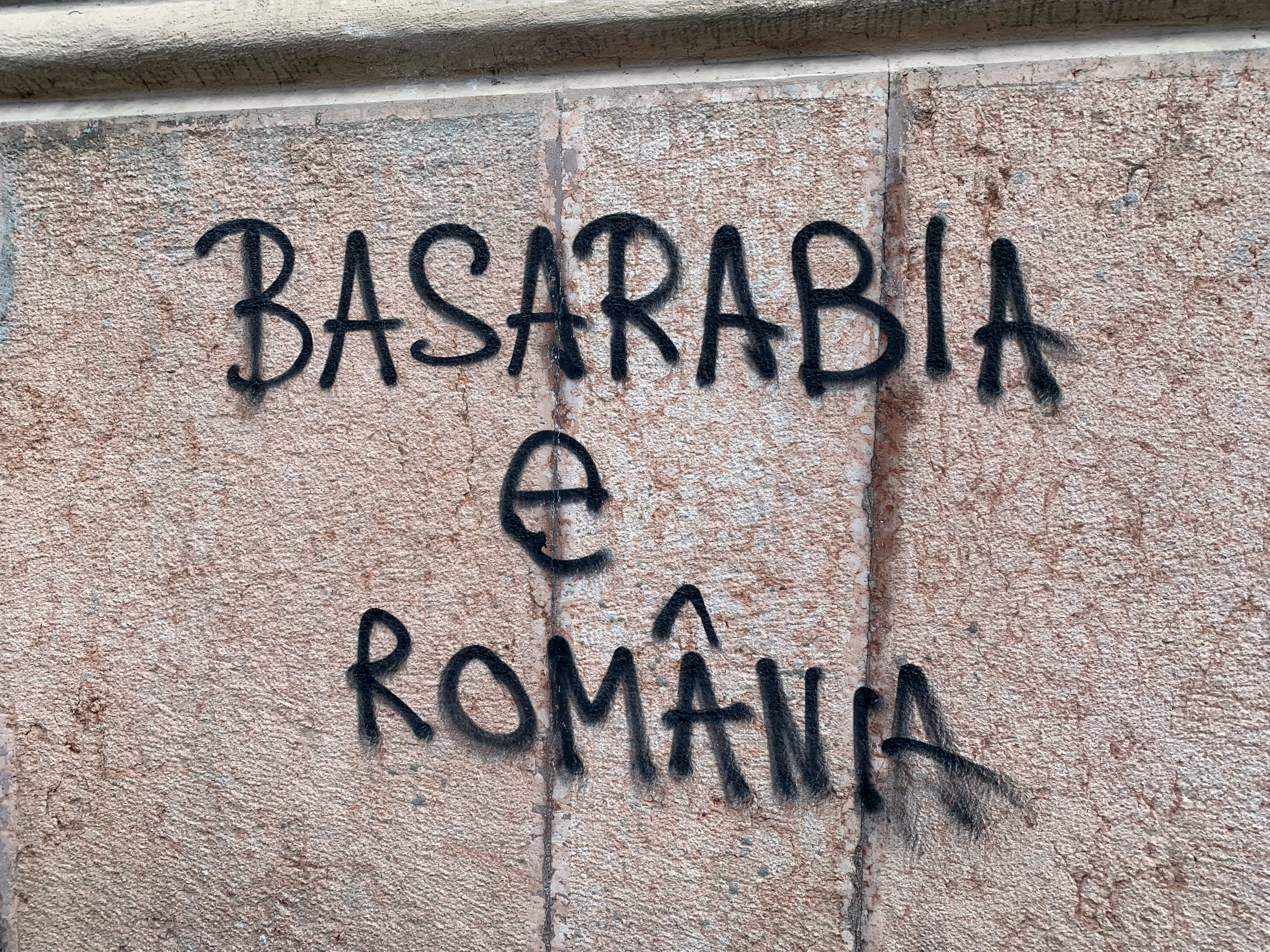
A graffiti writing "Basarabia e România" ("Bessarabia is Romania") in Timișoara, Romania - a slogan used by Romanian nationalists to claim Bessarabia

With the weakening of the Soviet Union, in February 1988, the first non-sanctioned demonstrations were held in Chișinău. At first pro-Perestroika, they soon turned anti-government and demanded official status for the Romanian (Moldavian) language instead of the Russian language. On August 31, 1989, following a 600,000-strong demonstration in Chișinău four days earlier, Romanian (Moldavian) became the official language of the Moldavian Soviet Socialist Republic. However, this was not implemented for many years. In 1990, the first free elections were held for Parliament, with the opposition Popular Front winning them. A government led by Mircea Druc, one of the leaders of the Popular Front, was formed. The Moldavian SSR became SSR Moldova, and later the Republic of Moldova. The Republic of Moldova became independent on August 27, 1991; it took over unchanged the boundaries of the Moldavian SSR.

== Population ==
According to Bessarabian historian Ștefan Ciobanu and Moldovan philologist Viorica Răileanu, in 1810, the Romanian population was approximately 95%. During the 19th century, as a result of the Russian policy of colonization and Russification, the Romanian population decreased to (depending on data sources) 47.6% (in 1897), 52% or 75% for 1900 (Krusevan), 53.9% (1907), 70% (1912, Laskov), or 65–67% (1918, J. Kaba).

The Russian Census of 1817, which recorded 96,526 families and 482,630 inhabitants, did not register ethnic data except for recent refugees (primarily Bulgarians) and certain ethno-social categories (Jews, Armenians and Greeks). Official records indicated 3,826 Jewish families (4.2%), 1,200 Lipovan families (1.5%), 640 Greek families (0.7%), 530 Armenian families (0.6%), 482 Bulgarian and Gagauz families (0.5%). In the 20th century, Romanian historian Ion Nistor extrapolated the number of Romanians at 83,848 families (86%) and Ruthenians at 6,000 families (6.5%). The estimate was based on the assumption that Ruthenes constituted up to a third of the population of the Khotyn county, and the rest of the recorded population was exclusively Romanian. An alternative estimate for the same year indicates 76.4% Romanians, 8.7% Ukrainians, 5.1% Bulgarians and Gaguzes, 4.5% Jews and 2% Russians. An 1818 statistic of three counties in southern Bessarabia (Akkerman, Izmail and Bender) that had witnessed strong emigration of the Muslim population and immigration from other regions, including Ottoman lands south of the Danube, recorded a total population of 113,835. There are conflicting figures regarding the national distribution (first figure cited by Poștarencu, second by Ungureanu): 48.64/37% Moldavians, 7.07/8.9% Russians, 15.65/17.9% Ukrainians, 17.02/21.5% Bulgarians and 11.62/14.7% others. Still in 1818, statistics for the Khotyn county in northern Bessarabia indicated 47.5% Moldavians and 42.6% Ukrainians.

The Moldovan historian Ion Gumenâi records the population of Bessarabia in 1828 as 517,135, and states that 376,910 were Romanians (72.88%), 52,000 Ruthenians (10.05%), 30,929 Jews (5.9%), 8,846 Germans (1.71%), 7,947 Russians (1.53%), 5,974 Lipovans (1.15%), 2,384 Poles (0.46%), 2,000 Greeks (0.38%), 2,000 Armenians (0.38%), and 27,445 (5.3%) settlers in the south of Bessarabia.

The first statistic to record ethnic groups throughout Bessarabia was an incomplete administrative census made in 1843–1844 at the request of the Russian Academy of Sciences. The following proportions were recorded, in a total of 692,777 inhabitants: 59.4% Romanians, 17.2% Ukrainians, 9.3% Bulgarians, 7.1% Jews, and 2.2% Russians. In the case of some urban centres, figures were not reported for all ethnic groups. Furthermore, the size of the total populations differs from other official reports of the same period, which put the population of Bessarabia at 774,492 or 793,103.

Church records gathered around 1850–1855 put the total population at 841,523, with the following composition: 51.4% Romanians, 4.2% Russians, 21.3% Ukrainians, 10% Bulgarians, 7.2% Jews and 5.7% others. On the other hand, official data for 1855 record a total population of 980,031, excluding the population on the territory under the authority of the Special Administration of the town of Izmail.

According to Ion Nistor, the population of Bessarabia in 1856 was composed of 736,000 Romanians (74%), 119,000 Ukrainians (12%), 79,000 Jews (8%), 47,000 Bulgarians and Gagauz (5%), 24,000 Germans (2.4%), 11,000 Romani (1.1%), 6,000 Russians (0.6%), adding to a total of 990,274 inhabitants. Historian Constantin Ungureanu provides significantly different figures for the same year: 676,100 Romanians (68.2%), 126,000 Ukrainians (12.7%), 78,800 Jews (7.9%), 48,200 Bulgarians and Gaguz (4.9%), 24,200 (2.4%) Germans and 20,000 Russians (2%) for a total of 991,900.

Russian data, 1889 (Total: 1,628,867 inhabitants)

The Russian census in 1897 had a total of 1,935,412 inhabitants. By language:

- 920,919 Romanians (47.6%)
- 379,698 Ukrainians (19.6%)
- 228,168 Jews (11.8%)
- 155,774 Russians (8%)
- 103,225 Bulgarians (5.3%)
- 60,026 Germans (3.1%)
- 55,790 Turks (Gagauzes) (2.9%)

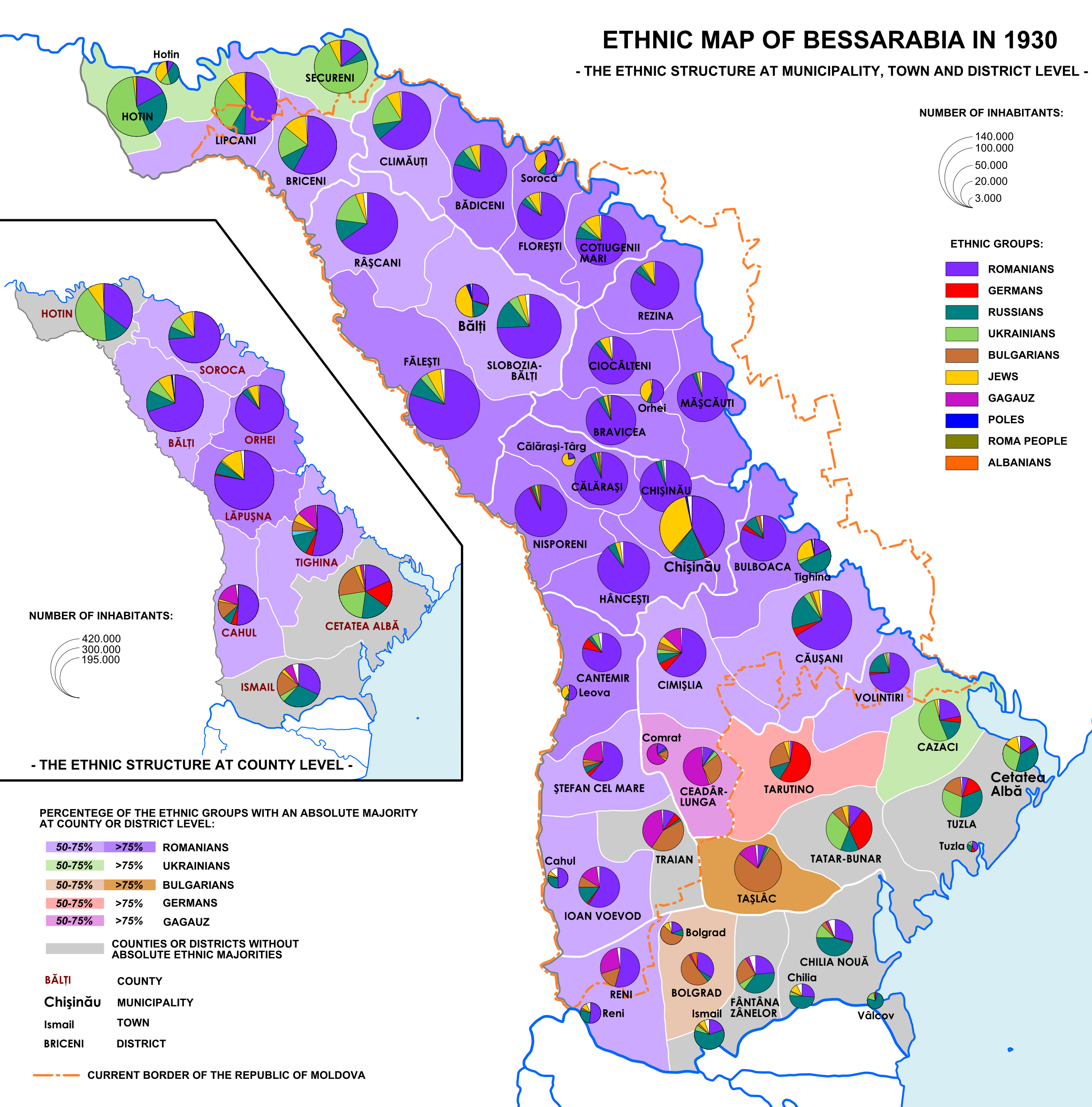
Ethnic map of Bessarabia in 1930

However, some scholars believed in regard to the 1897 census that "[...] the census enumerator generally has instructions to count everyone who understands the state language as being of that nationality, no matter what his everyday speech may be". Thus, a number of Romanians might have been registered as Russians.

According to N. Durnovo, the population of Bessarabia in 1900 was (1,935,000 inhabitants):

County	Romanians	Ukrainians and Russians	Jews	Bulgarians and Gagauz	Germans, Greeks, Armenians, others	Total inhabitants
Hotin County	89,000	161,000	54,000	3,000		307,000
Soroca County	156,000	28,000	31,000	4,000		219,000
Bălți County	154,000	27,000	17,000	14,000		212,000
Orhei County	176,000	10,000	26,000	1,000		213,000
Lăpușna County	198,000	19,000	53,000	10,000		280,000
Tighina County	103,000	32,000	16,000	36,000	8,000	195,000
Cahul and Ismail^{1}	109,000	53,000	11,000	27,000	44,000	244,000
Cetatea Albă County	106,000	48,000	11,000	52,500	47,500	265,000
Total	1,092,000	378,000	219,000	247,000		1,935,000
%	56.5%	19.5%	11.5%	12.5%		100%

Notes: ^{1} The two counties were merged.

The Romanian estimates in 1919 (1922) gave a total populations of 2,631,000 inhabitants:

- 1,685,000 Romanians (64.0%)
- 254,000 Ukrainians (9.7%)
- 287,000 Jews (10.2%)
- 75,000 Russians (2.8%)
- 147,000 Bulgarians (5.6%)
- 79,000 Germans (3.0%)
- 59,000 Lipovans and Cossacks (2.2%)
- 67,000 Others (2.5%)

According to the 1930 Romanian census, the total population of Bessarabia was 2,864,662 inhabitants:

County	Romanians	Ukrainians	Russians^{1}	Jews	Bulgarians	Gagauz	Germans	others^{2}	Total inhabitants
Hotin County	137,348	163,267	53,453	35,985	26	2	323	2,026	392,430
Soroca County	232,720	26,039	25,736	29,191	69	13	417	2,183	316,368
Bălți County	270,942	29,288	46,569	31,695	66	8	1,623	6,530	386,721
Orhei County	243,936	2,469	10,746	18,999	87	1	154	2,890	279,282
Lăpușna County	326,455	2,732	29,770	50,013	712	37	2,823	7,079	419,621
Tighina County	163,673	9,047	44,989	16,845	19,599	39,345	10,524	2,570	306,592
Cahul County	100,714	619	14,740	4,434	28,565	35,299	8,644	3,948	196,963
Ismail County	72,020	10,655	66,987	6,306	43,375	15,591	983	9,592	225,509
Cetatea Albă County	62,949	70,095	58,922	11,390	71,227	7,876	55,598	3,119	341,176
Total	1,610,757	314,211	351,912	204,858	163,726	98,172	81,089	39,937	2,864,662
%	56.23%	10.97%	12.28%	7.15%	5.72%	3.43%	2.83%	1.39%	100%

Notes: ^{1} Includes Lipovans. ^{2} Poles, Armenians, Albanians, Greeks, Gypsies, etc. and non-declared

The data of the Romanian census of 1939 was not completely processed before the Soviet occupation of Bessarabia. However, estimates had the total population rise to approximately 3.2 million.

The census of 1941, during the Romanian wartime administration (Total: 2,733,563 inhabitants):

- 1,793,493 Romanians (65.6%)
- 449,540 Ukrainians (16.4%)
- 177,647 Bulgarians (6.5%)
- 164,410 Russians (6.0%)
- 115,683 Gagauz (4.2%)
- 9,086 Poles (0.3%)
- 6,882 Jews (0.3%)
- 2,058 Germans (0.1%)
- 14,794 Others (0.6%)

In the 1979 Soviet census for the Moldavian SSR (including Transnistria, but without northern and southern Bessarabia, now both part of Ukraine): 63.9% identified themselves as Moldovans and 0.04% as Romanians. For the Soviet census of 1989 (conducted in the Moldavian SSR), 64.5% declared themselves as Moldovans and 0.06% Romanians. In the Moldovan census of 2014 (not including Transnistria), 75% declared themselves Moldovans and 7% Romanians.

== Economy ==
- 1911: There were 165 loan societies, 117 savings banks, 43 professional savings and loan societies, and eight Zemstvo loan offices; all these had total assets of about 10,000,000 rubles. There were also 89 government savings banks, with deposits of about 9,000,000 rubles.
- 1918: There was only 1,057 km (657 mi) of railway; the main lines converged on Russia and were broad gauge. Rolling stock and right of way were in bad shape. There were about 400 locomotives, with only about 100 fit for use. There were 290 passenger coaches and 33 more out for repair. Finally, out of 4530 freight cars and 187 tank cars, only 1389 and 103 were usable. The Romanians reduced the gauge to a standard 1,440 mm (56.5 in), so that cars could be run to the rest of Europe. Also, there were only a few inefficient boat bridges. Romanian highway engineers decided to build ten bridges: Cuzlău, Țuțora, Lipcani, Șerpenița, Ștefănești–Brăniște, Cahul-Oancea, Bădărăi-Moara Domnească, Sărata, Bumbala-Leova, Badragi and Fălciu (Fălciu is a locality in Romania. Its correspondent in Bessarabia is Cantemir.) Of these, only four were ever finished: Cuzlău, Fălciu, Lipcani, and Sărata.

== See also ==
- Bessarabia Germans
- Bessarabian Bulgarians
- "Bessarabia, Romanian land"
- Budjak (southern Bessarabia)
- Chernivtsi Oblast
- Dazdie
- History of Moldova
- History of Moldavia
- History of the Jews in Bessarabia
- Hotin County
- Moldovan wine
- Moldova
- Odesa Oblast
