= Benia =

Benia may refer to:

- Benia (bug), a genus if shield bugs in the tribe Cappaeini
- A village in Moldova-Sulița Commune, Suceava County, Romania
