= Murder Inn =

Orizont
- Directed by: Marian Crișan
- Written by: Marian Crișan
- Story by: Ioan Slavici
- Produced by: Marian Crișan; Bobby Păunescu; Viorel Sergovici Jr. Mihai Dorobanțu
- Starring: András Hatházi; Rodica Lazăr; Bogdán Zsolt
- Cinematography: Oleg Mutu
- Production companies: Solar Indie Junction; Rova Film
- Release date: November 2015 (Tallinn)
- Country: Romania
- Language: Romanian

Murder Inn (Romanian: Orizont) is a 2015 Romanian drama film written and directed by Marian Crișan, adapted from the novella Moara cu Noroc by Ioan Slavici.

== Cast ==
- András Hatházi - Lucian
- Rodica Lazăr - Andra
- Bogdán Zsolt - Zoli
- Valeriu Andriuță - Pintea
- Emilian Oprea - Adi
- Maria Seleș - Victoria
- Elena Purea - Procuror
- Mihai Dorobanțu - Senatorul
- Dan Rădulescu - Judecătorul
- Costin Gavaza - Avocat
- Radu Ciobanașu - Polițist
- Dorin C. Zachei - Petrecăreț 1
- Fărcuț Ghiță Daniel - Petrecăreț 2
- Krisztina Bíró - Petrecăreață 1
- Lucian Diaconu - Petrecăreț 3
- Dana Diaconu - Petrecăreață 2

== See also ==
- Romanian New Wave
- Cinema of Romania
- The Mill of Good Luck (1955)
