= Rodica =

Rodica may refer to:

== People ==
- Rodica Bretin (born 1958), Romanian writer
- Rodica Lazăr, or Elizabeth of Pasărea (1970–2014), Romanian Orthodox schemanun
- Rodica Mateescu (born 1971), Romanian triple jumper
- Rodica Popescu Bitănescu (born 1938), Romanian actress
- Rodica Ramer, Romanian-born Australian professor of microelectronics
- Rodica Șerban (born 1983), Romanian rower
- Rodica Stănoiu (born 1939), Romanian jurist and politician

== Places in Slovenia ==
- Rodica, Domžale, a settlement in the Municipality of Domžale
- Little Mount Rodica (Mala Rodica), a 1836 m mountain in the Julian Alps, northwestern Slovenia
- Rodica Hill, a 307 m hill in Rodica, Domžale
- Mount Rodica, a 1966 m mountain in the Julian Alps, northwestern Slovenia
- Mount Suha Rodica, a 1944 m mountain in the Julian Alps, northwestern Slovenia
