= Moara =

Moara may refer to:

== Places ==
- Moara, Burkina Faso
- Moara, Suceava, Romania
- Moara, Puchenii Mari, Prahova County, Romania

== Rivers ==
- Moara (Siret), Romania

== See also ==
- Morar (disambiguation)
- Moraru (disambiguation)
