= Morar (surname) =

The Romanian-language surname Morar, literally meaning "miller", is specific to the Moldavia region.

The surname may refer to:

- Daniel Morar, Romanian prosecutor
- Ioan T. Morar, Romanian journalist
- Mihai Morar, Romanian entertainer
- Natalia Morari, Moldovan journalist
- Vasile Morar, Romanian ice hockey player
- Vlad Morar, Romanian football player
- Vincent (Morar), bishop of the Russian Orthodox Church

== See also ==
- Morari (disambiguation)
