= Rodica Ramer =

Physicist / electrical engineer

- Education: University of Bucharest
- Employer: University of New South Wales (1993–)

Rodica Ramer is a Romanian-born Australian professor of microelectronics at the University of New South Wales, where she and her team work on the development of radio-frequency microelectronic technologies, advancing wireless communication technology. She earned a Ph.D from the University of Bucharest in solid-state physics in 1992. Prior to working at UNSW, she was a senior research scientist at the Microwave Laboratory, National Centre for Nuclear Energy of Romania, a research associate at the Superconductivity Laboratory, the University of Alabama, Tuscaloosa, and at the Microwave Laboratory, Colorado State University, Fort Collins. She is a fellow of the Electromagnetics Academy.

She has authored over 200 publications and holds a number of patents relating to microwave waveguide devices and antennas.

== Selected publications ==
- King Yuk Chan; Rodica Ramer; Raafat R. Mansour; Roberto Sorrentino (June 2021). "Harmonic Characterizations of Loaded Resonators for Waveguide Filters". IEEE Transactions on Industrial Electronics. 68 (6): 5448–5459. doi:10.1109/TIE.2020.2987278. ISSN 0278-0046. Wikidata Q108802344.
- Sheng Huang; King Yuk Chan; Yunhao Fu; Rodica Ramer (13 January 2021). "Dielectric‐loaded substrate integrated waveguide H‐plane horn antenna with embedded air cavity". IET Microwaves Antennas and Propagation. 15 (2): 154–162. doi:10.1049/MIA2.12036. ISSN 1751-8725. Wikidata Q108802346.
- Sheng Huang; King Yuk Chan; Rodica Ramer (January 2021). "Dielectric-Loaded SIW H-Plane Horn Antenna With Gradient Air Slots". IEEE Antennas and Wireless Propagation Letters. 20 (1): 43–47. doi:10.1109/LAWP.2020.3039265. ISSN 1536-1225. Wikidata Q108802348.
- B. C. Johnson; H. U. Rahman; E. Gauja; R. Ramer; J. C. McCallum (February 2010), Deep level transient spectroscopy study of defects at Si/SiO 2 and Si/Si 3 N 4 interfaces, Institute of Electrical and Electronics Engineers, doi:10.1109/ICONN.2010.6045257, Wikidata Q59457998
- Elena Dimitriu; Alin Iuga; Rodica Ramer; Ion Sandu; Marin Cernea (18 May 2007). "Structural and Dielectric Investigations of Donor–Acceptor Substituted PZT Ceramics". Ferroelectrics. 353 (1): 138–148. doi:10.1080/00150190701368091. ISSN 0015-0193. Wikidata Q108807210.
