= Ferroelectrics (journal) =

Scientific journal

- Discipline: Ferroelectricity; materials science
- Language: English
- Edited by: Kenji Uchino; Deborah J. Taylor

Publication details
- History: 1970—present
- Publisher: Taylor & Francis
- Frequency: Bimonthly
- Impact factor: 0.6 (2024)

Standard abbreviations
- ISO 4: Ferroelectrics

Indexing
- CODEN: FEROA8
- ISSN: 0015-0193 (print); 1563-5112 (web)

Links
- Journal homepage; Online access; Online archive

Ferroelectrics is a peer-reviewed scientific journal published bimonthly by Taylor & Francis. Established in 1970, it covers research on ferroelectrics and related materials, including but not limited to ferroelastics, ferromagnets, piezoelectrics and pyroelectrics. Its current editors-in-chief are Kenji Uchino (Pennsylvania State University) and Deborah J. Taylor (Crawley Research Associates).

The journal is alternatively known as Ferroelectrics and Related Materials. A letters section of the journal, titled Ferroelectrics Letters Section, subsequently became a separate publication in 1983.

== Abstracting and indexing ==
The journal is abstracted and indexed in:

- Chemical Abstracts Service
- Current Contents/Physical, Chemical & Earth Sciences
- EBSCO databases
- Ei Compendex
- Inspec
- ProQuest databases
- Science Citation Index Expanded
- Scopus

According to the Journal Citation Reports, the journal has a 2024 impact factor of 0.6.
