= Elizabeth of Pasărea =

Romanian Orthodox schemanun and saint (1970–2014)

Saint Elizabeth of Pasărea

Venerable Schemanun
- Born: Rodica Lazăr; 16 July 1970; Moldova-Sulița, Suceava County, Socialist Republic of Romania (modern-day Romania)
- Died: 5 June 2014 (aged 43)
- Honored in: Eastern Orthodox Church
- Canonized: 1–2 July 2025 by the Holy Synod of the Romanian Orthodox Church
- Feast: 5 June

Elisabeta Lazăr (born Rodica Lazăr; 16 July 1970 – 5 June 2014) was a Romanian Orthodox schemanun from Pasărea Monastery.

== Life ==
She was born in the rural commune of Moldova-Sulița to her parents Maria and Vasile Lazăr ,as one of eleven children. She was baptised with the name of Rodica. In September 1986, Lazăr—aged 16—completed a pilgrimage at Pasărea Monastery alongside two of her cousins. There, they were counselled by several of the monastery's spiritual fathers.

Four years later, on 12 December 1990, she was tonsured by Archimandrite Macarie Ioniță, the spiritual father of Pasărea Monastery, being given the monastic name of Elizabeth and the obedience of working in the monastery's metalwork workshop.

== Veneration ==
She was canonised as a saint by the Holy Synod of the Romanian Orthodox Church in its meeting on 1 July 2025 along with 15 other female Romanian saints, with the title of Venerable Saint Elizabeth of Pasărea (Romanian: Sfânta Cuvioasă Elisabeta de la Pasărea), with her feast day being commemorated on 5 June.

Her relics were exhumed on 16 January 2026. The Church of the Valea Seacă Hermitage at the foot of Rarău Massif is the first church dedicated to Saint Elizabeth, who spent the last part of her life as a hermit in the Giumalău Mountains.

== See also ==
- List of Eastern Orthodox saints
