= Piatra Buhei =

Piatra Buhei (original name)
- IUCN category III (natural monument or feature)
- Interactive map of Piatra Buhei (original name)
- Location: Suceava County, Romania
- Nearest city: Câmpulung Moldovenesc
- Length: 2 (Square metre)
- Area: Romania; Suceava County
- Established: 1971, declared in 2000

Piatra Buhei ("Buhei Rock") is a natural monument in Romania protected by national interest what correspond a -III- a IUCN (natural reserve of kind geologic and paleontologic). Located in Suceava County, on administrative of the city Câmpulung Moldovenesc.

== Description ==
The natural area is near Giumalău Mountain, in central part of Suceava County, on exit from Câmpulung Moldovenesc city, in slope of valley Izvorul Alb an affluent of left to Moldova River, near country road (DJ175A) Chiril - Câmpulung.

Natural reserve with a surface of 2 ha was declared a protected area from The Law nr.5 from 6 March 2000 Art. 1 (seen approval of the Plan of sparing the national territory - Section a III-a - protected area) and represent a zone (outcrop) of geologic and palaeoentomological interest, in slope of creek Izvorul Alb.
