= Kenji Uchino =

American electronics engineer

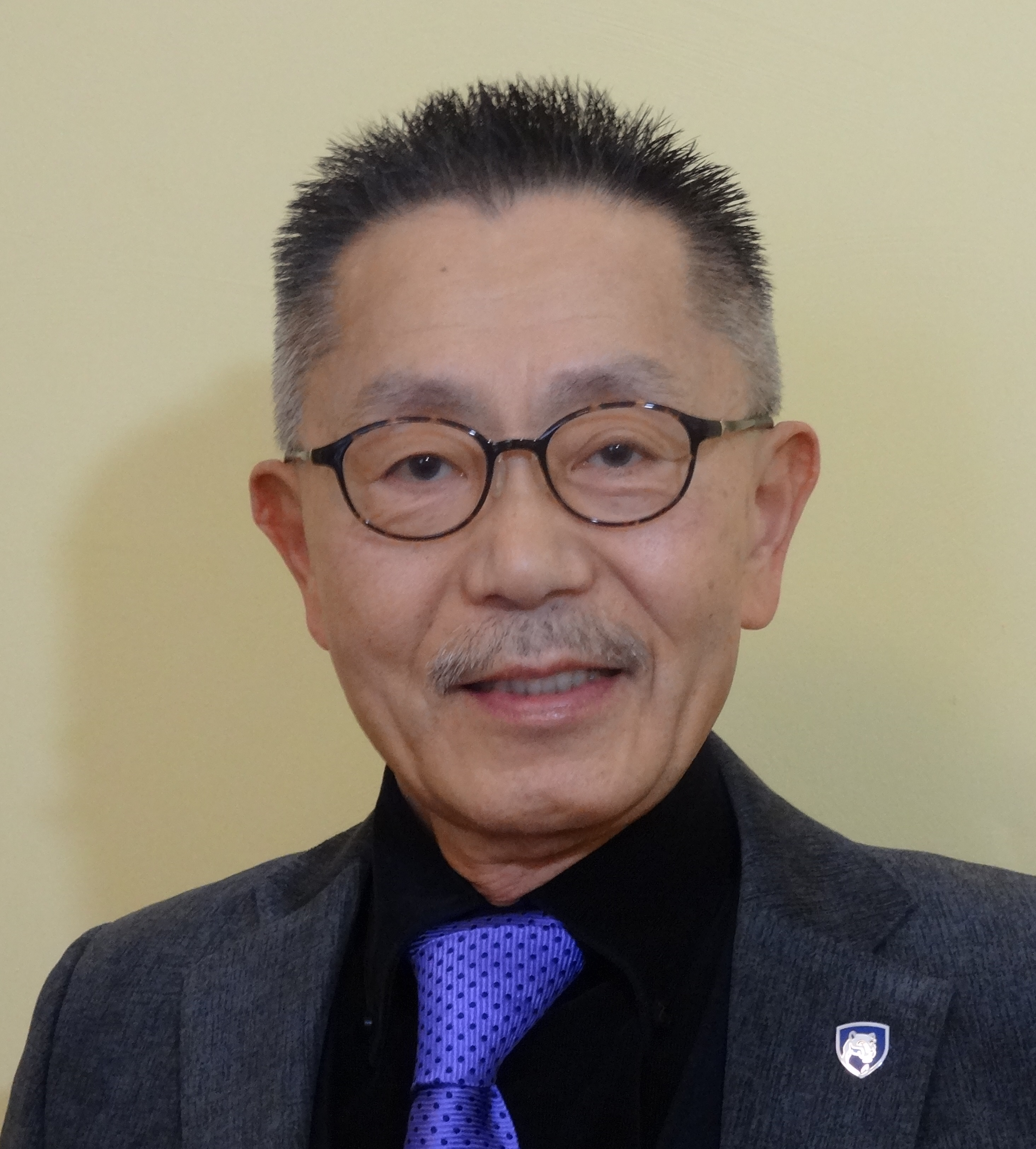
- Born: 内野研二; April 3, 1950 (age 76); Tokyo, Japan
- Awards: Adaptive Structures Prize, American Society of Mechanical Engineers (2005); UFFC Ferroelectrics Recognition Award, IEEE (2013); International Ceramic Award, Global Academy of Ceramics (2016); Distinguished Lecturer, The IEEE UFFC Society (2018)

Academic background
- Education: B.Sc., Physics; M.S., Physical Electronics; Ph.D., Physical Electronics; MBA, Business Administration
- Alma mater: Tokyo Institute of Technology; Saint Francis University

Kenji Uchino is an American electronics engineer, physicist, academic, inventor and industry executive. He is currently an academy professor of Electrical Engineering, Emeritus Academy Institute at Pennsylvania State University, where he also directs the International Center for Actuators and Transducers at Materials Research Institute. He is the former associate director (US Navy Ambassador to Japan) at The US Office of Naval Research – Global Tokyo Office.

Uchino has conducted extensive research on solid state physics, focusing especially on ferroelectrics and piezoelectrics. He is one of the pioneers in piezoelectric actuators and electro-optic displays and is the inventor of topics including lead magnesium niobate (PMN)-based electrostricive materials, cofired multilayer piezoelectric actuators, superior electromechanical coupling relaxor-PbTiO_3 single crystals, magnetoelectric laminated composite sensors, shape memory ceramics, and micro ultrasonic motors. Uchino's work has resulted in over 584 research papers, over 78 books and 33 patents in the ceramic actuator area.

Uchino is a Life Fellow of IEEE, American Ceramic Society and International Association of Advanced Materials, and a senior member of National Academy of Inventors. He chaired the Smart Actuators/Sensors Study Committee in Japan from 1987 till 2014. Uchino is the Editor in Chief of J. Actuators, MDPI, J. Current Applied Materials, J. Current Mechanics and Advanced Materials, Bentham Science Pub. Ltd., and J. Insight-Material Science, PiscoMed Publishing LLT.

== Early life and education ==
Uchino was born in Tokyo in 1950, and grew up in Hiroshima. He studied at Tokyo Institute of Technology in Japan and completed his B.Sc. degree in physics in 1973. He then received his M.S. and Ph.D. degree in Physical Electronics in 1975 and 1981, respectively. He was awarded his MBA degree from Saint Francis University in 2008.

== Career ==
Uchino taught as an assistant professor at Tokyo Institute of Technology and the Pennsylvania State University from 1976 till 1985 before joining Sophia University in Japan as an associate professor of physics. In 1991, he was appointed by the Pennsylvania State University as Professor at Electrical Engineering and Materials Research Institute. Uchino was appointed as Founding Director of International Center for Actuators and Transducers in 1992. He served as a distinguished honors faculty at Schreyer Honors College at Pennsylvania State University from 2018 till 2020.

Uchino was appointed as a Standing Auditor of Tokyo Savor Electronics Co. in the 1990s. He has also served as deputy director of System Technology Laboratory at NF Corporation in Japan. He was also the Founder and Senior Vice President & CTO of Micromechatronics Inc., State College.

From 2010 till 2014, he served as an associate director of Asia Office at Office of Naval Research-Global in Japan.

== Research ==
Uchino is one of the pioneers in piezoelectric actuators and electro-optic display. He has conducted research on solid state physics, focusing especially on ferroelectrics and piezoelectrics, as well as on application development of solid state actuators for precision positioners, ultrasonic motors, smart structures, piezoelectric transformers and energy harvesting.

=== Materials developments ===
Uchino, along with his team, was the first to discover the giant electro-strictive effect in lead magnesium niobate based relaxor ferroelectric materials. His discovery led to the 'smart actuator' boom. He has also contributed significantly to the single crystal growth of piezoelectric transducer materials, and is one of the discoverers of the highest electromechanical coupling factor of 95% in lead zinc niobate - lead titanate single crystals.

Uchino reported the existence of the critical particle size below which all ferroelectric ceramics will lose ferro-electricity. His work led to triggering of later micro/nanotechnology research in the ferroelectric field, specifically in thin film applications.

Uchino contributed to the fundamental phenomenology in relaxor ferroelectrics and proposed a modified Curie-Weiss Law in the early 1980s.

Uchino discovered 'photostrictive effect' and by combining the photovoltaic effect and piezoelectricity, he invented photo-driven actuators. He investigated the basic ceramic compositions in La-doped lead zirconate titanate (PLZT).

Uchino has also worked on high power density piezo-ceramics, and developed a new methodology on measuring three losses separately in piezoelectrics. He also developed practical high power piezo-materials with the maximum vibration velocity.

=== Device designing ===
Uchino proposed the basic idea of co-fired multilayer actuators in late 1970s which led to the mass-production of piezoelectric multilayer actuators by NEC Corporation. He is also the inventor of Cymbal actuators that consist of a thin multilayer piezoelectric element and two metal end caps with narrow cymbal-shaped cavities bonded together.

In collaboration with Denso Corporation in Japan, Uchino worked on piezoelectric energy harvesting with cymbal transducers from the engine vibration in a car. His work was recognized with an Inventor Award from Center for Energy Harvesting Materials and Systems.

Uchino has also worked on compact ultrasonic motors with the minimum components. His original design consisted of only two basic components, and guaranteed reduction of manufacturing cost and improvement of production efficiency and reliability. He combined magnetostrictor and piezoelectric materials and is one of the pioneers in magnetoelectric devices.

=== Drive/Control techniques ===
Uchino reported the analysis of transient vibration generated by a piezoelectric actuator after applying a pulse voltage. He proposed the idea of health monitoring of piezoelectric actuators by using AE monitoring and/or strain gauge type internal electrodes. He based his idea on the crack propagation mechanisms in multilayer piezo-actuators.

Uchino designed Buck-Converters for resolving the issue of energy harvesting circuit for realizing piezoelectric energy harvesting systems.

== Awards and honors ==
- 1987 - Best Paper Award, Japanese Society of Oil/Air Pressure Control
- 1993 - Honorary Membership of KERAMOS
- 1997 - Fellow of American Ceramics Society
- 2005 - Adaptive Structures Prize, American Society of Mechanical Engineers
- 2007 - R&D 100 Award
- 2007 - Smart Product Implementation Award, Society of Photo-Optical Instrumentation Engineers
- 2008 - Outstanding Academic Book Award for ‘’Micromechatronics’’, Japanese Society of Applied Electromagnetics and Mechanics
- 2010 - Editorial Board Award for Life long contribution to the Editorial Board of Japanese Journal of Applied Physics, Japanese Applied Physics Society.
- 2011 - Premier Research Award, Penn State Engineering Alumni Society
- 2011 - Inventor Award for “Piezoelectric Energy Harvesting System”, Center for Energy Harvesting Materials and Systems, Virginia Tech
- 2012 - Fellow of IEEE
- 2013 - Recognition Award, IEEE/UFFC Ferroelectrics
- 2016 - International Ceramic Award, Global Academy of Ceramics
- 2017 - Distinguished Lecturer of the IEEE UFFC Society
- 2019 - Wilhelm R. Buessem Award, Center for Dielectrics and Piezoelectrics, Penn State University
- 2022 - Japan Ceramics Grand Prix from Japanese Ceramics Society

== Bibliography ==
=== Selected books ===
- Piezoelectric Actuators and Ultrasonic Motors (1997) ISBN 9780792398110
- Ferroelectric devices (2000) ISBN 9780585392264 2nd Edition (2010) ISBN 9781439803752
- MicroMechatronics (2003) ISBN 9780824741099 2nd Edition (2020) ISBN 9780367202316
- FEM and Micromechatronics with ATILA Software (2008) ISBN 9781420058796
- High-Power Piezoelectrics and Loss Mechanisms (2020) ISBN 9780367540692
- Entrepreneurship for Engineers (2009) ISBN 9781439800669
- Global Crisis and Sustainability Technologies (2017) ISBN 9789813142312

=== Selected articles ===
- Uchino, K., & Nomura, S. (1982). Critical exponents of the dielectric constants in diffused-phase-transition crystals. Ferroelectrics, 44(1), 55–61.
- Uchino, K., Sadanaga, E., & Hirose, T. (1989). Dependence of the crystal structure on particle size in barium titanate. Journal of the American Ceramic Society, 72(8), 1555–1558.
- Kuwata, J., Uchino, K., & Nomura, S. (1982). Dielectric and piezoelectric properties of 0.91 Pb (Zn1/3Nb2/3) O3-0.09 PbTiO3 single crystals. Japanese Journal of Applied Physics, 21(9R), 1298.
- Ryu, J., Carazo, A. V., Uchino, K., & Kim, H. E. (2001). Magnetoelectric properties in piezoelectric and magnetostrictive laminate composites. Japanese Journal of Applied Physics, 40(8R), 4948.
- Ryu, J., Priya, S., Uchino, K., & Kim, H. E. (2002). Magnetoelectric effect in composites of magnetostrictive and piezoelectric materials. Journal of electroceramics, 8(2), 107–119.
