= Gordinești, Edineț =

Gordinești
- Village
- Location within Edineț
- Coordinates: 48°9′23″N 27°10′5″E
- Country: Moldova
- District: Edineț District

Government
  - Mayor: Victor Guriev (PLDM)
- Elevation: 169 m (554 ft)

Population (2014 census)
  - Total: 3,093
- Time zone: UTC+2 (EET)
  - Summer (DST): UTC+3 (EEST)
- Postal code: MD-4631

Gordinești is a village in Edineț District, Moldova.
