= Morari =

Morari may refer to:

- Manfred Morari (born 1951), American control theorist
- Natalia Morari (born 1984), Moldovan journalist
- Lorenzo Morari, 18th century Italian composer, see Farnace
- Morari Bapu, Indian spiritual leader
- Another name for Morori language
