= Zamostea =

- Commune
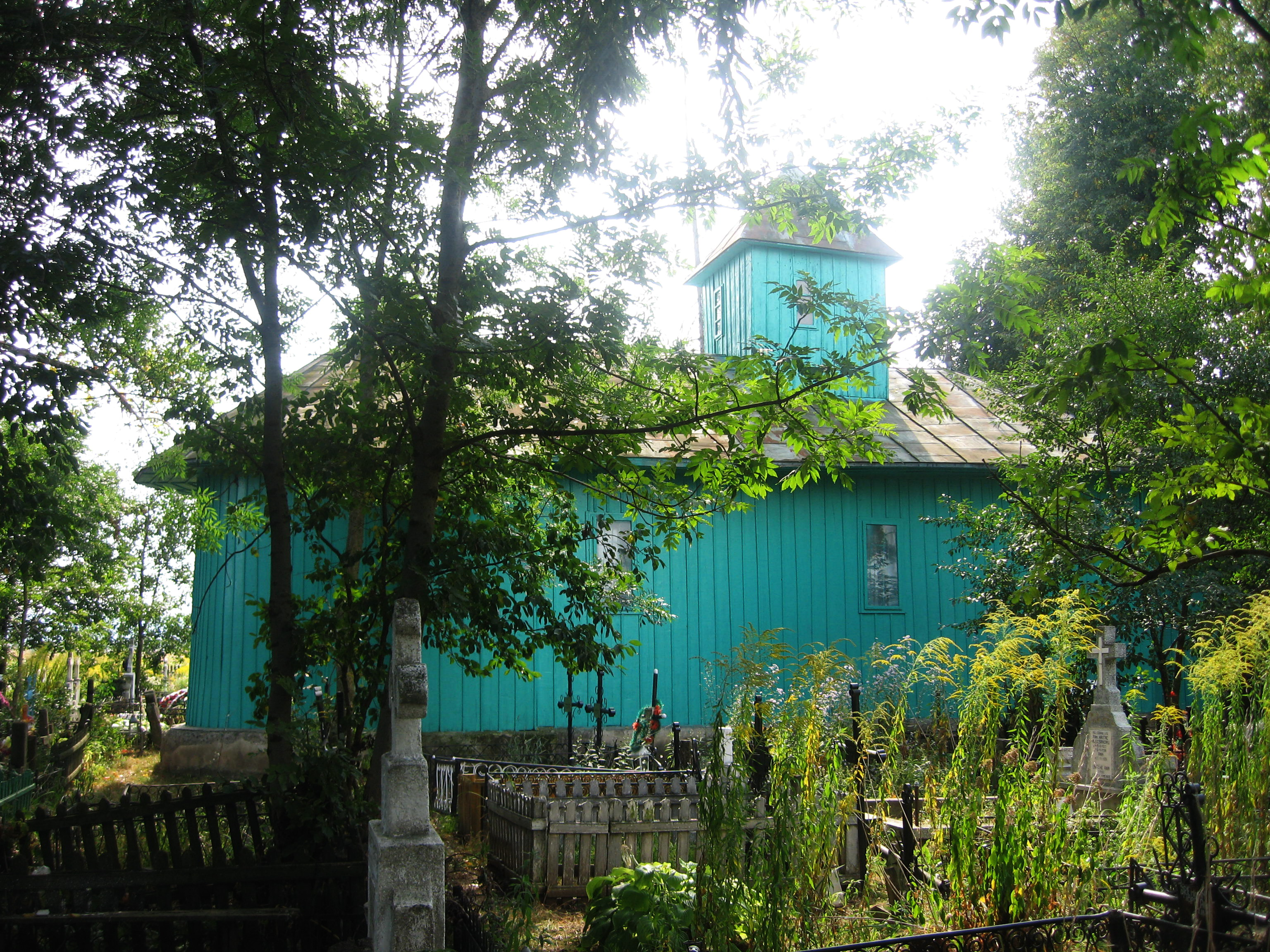
- Wooden church in Zamostea

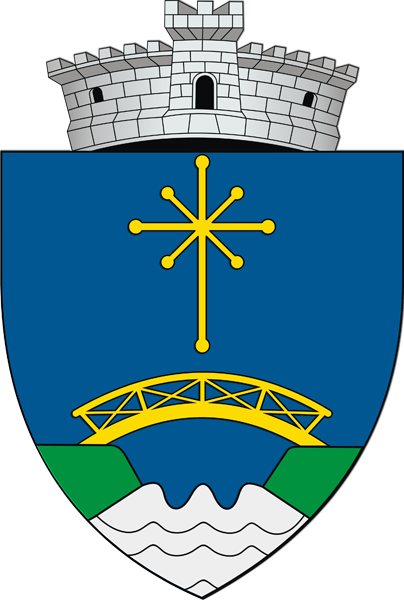
- Coat of arms

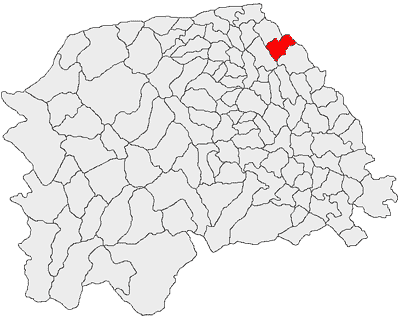
- Location in Suceava County

- Location in Romania
- Coordinates: 47°52′N 26°12′E
- Country: Romania
- County: Suceava

Government
  - Mayor (2020–2024): Vasile Haliuc (PSD)
- Area: 46.86 km^{2} (18.09 sq mi)
- Elevation: 297 m (974 ft)
- Population (2021-12-01): 2,659
  - Density: 56.74/km^{2} (147.0/sq mi)
- Time zone: UTC+02:00 (EET)
  - Summer (DST): UTC+03:00 (EEST)
- Postal code: 727630
- Area code: +(40) 230
- Vehicle reg.: SV
- Website: zamostea.ro

Zamostea is a commune located in Suceava County, Western Moldavia, northeastern Romania. It is composed of nine villages, namely: Badragi, Ciomârtan, Cojocăreni, Corpaci, Lunca, Nicani, Răuțeni, Tăutești, and Zamostea.

The commune is located in the northeastern part of the county, 32 km (20 mi) north of the county seat, Suceava, on the border with Botoșani County. It is situated at an altitude of 297 m (974 ft), on the right bank of the Siret River.
