= Moara Dracului Gorge =

- Cheile Moara Dracului
- IUCN category III (natural monument or feature)
- Location within Romania
- Location: Suceava County, Romania
- Nearest city: Câmpulung Moldovenesc
- Coordinates: 47.475°N 25.611°E

The Moara Dracului Gorge (Romanian: Cheile Moara Dracului) is a natural monument in Suceava County, Romania. It is a 60-70 m long and 4-5 m wide gorge with vertical walls, situated on the upper course of the small river Valea Caselor, a tributary of the Moldova.
