= Moldova-Sulița =

- Commune
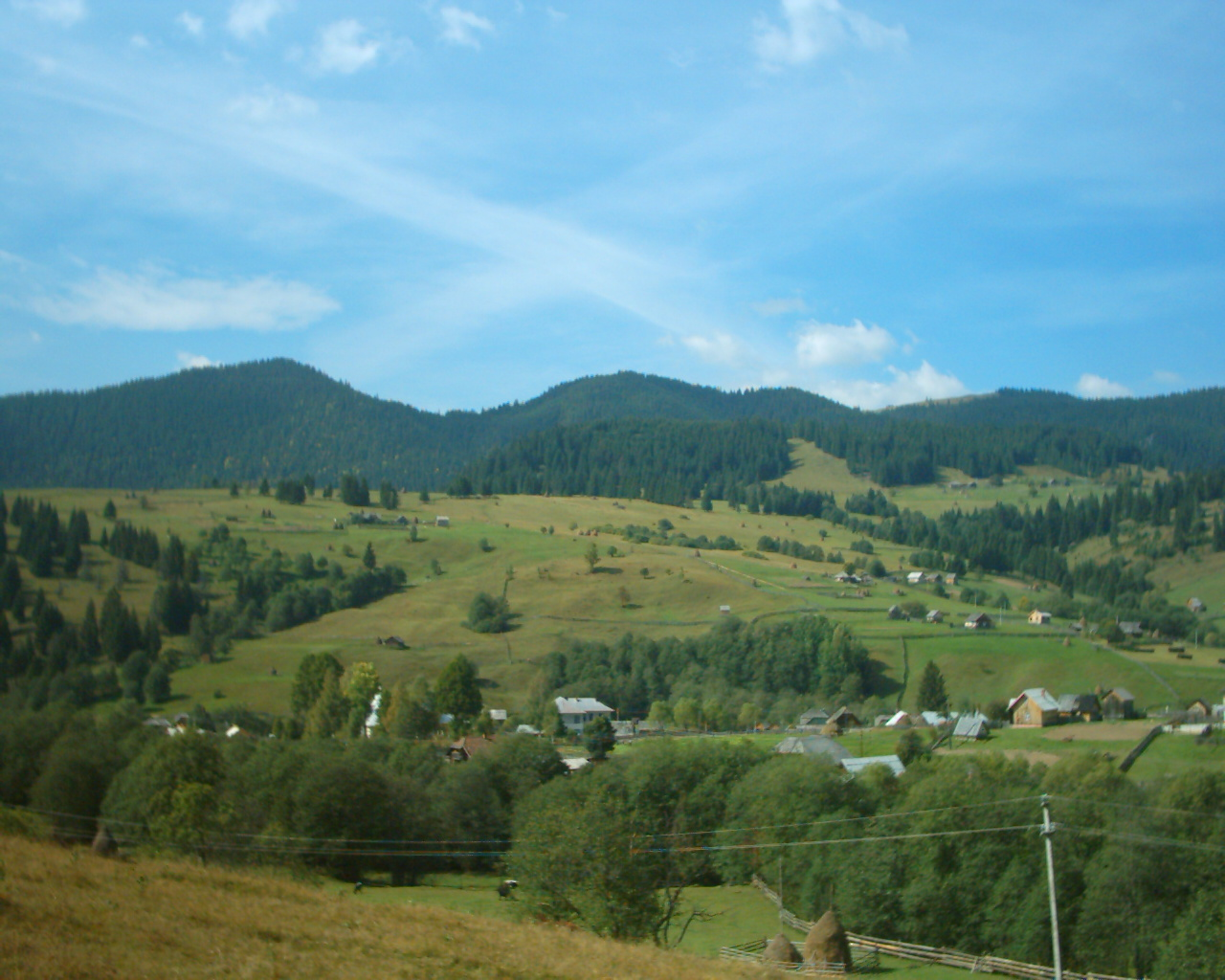
- Rural landscape in Benia, Moldova-Sulița

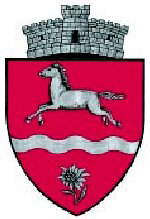
- Coat of arms

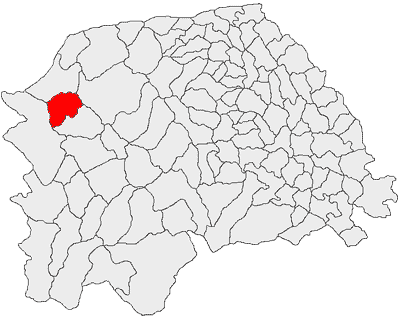
- Location in Suceava County

- Location in Romania
- Coordinates: 47°42′N 25°15′E
- Country: Romania
- County: Suceava
- Subdivisions: Moldova-Sulița, Benia

Government
  - Mayor (2024–2028): Petru Jecalo (PNL)
- Area: 98 km^{2} (38 sq mi)
- Elevation: 977 m (3,205 ft)
- Population (2021-12-01): 1,671
  - Density: 17/km^{2} (44/sq mi)
- Time zone: UTC+02:00 (EET)
  - Summer (DST): UTC+03:00 (EEST)
- Postal code: 727380
- Area code: (+40) x30
- Vehicle reg.: SV
- Website: moldovasulita.eu

Moldova-Sulița (German: Moldawa Sulitza) is a commune located in Suceava County, in the historical region of Bukovina, northeastern Romania. It is composed of two villages, Benia and Moldova-Sulița.

== Administration and local politics ==
=== Communal council ===
The commune's current local council has the following political composition, according to the results of the 2020 Romanian local elections:

Party	Seats	Current Council
National Liberal Party (PNL)	7	
Social Democratic Party (PSD)	3	
People's Movement Party (PMP)	1	

== Notable people ==
- Elizabeth of Pasărea (1970–2014), Romanian Orthodox schemanun and saint
