= Moraru =

Moraru may refer to:

- Moraru (surname), a Romanian-language surname meaning "miller"
- Moraru River, in Romania
