= Boul =

Boul may refer to:

- Boul, a tributary of the Suceava in Suceava County
- Boul (Tazlău), a tributary of the Tazlău in Bacău County
- Jack Boul (1927–2024), artist and teacher based in Washington, D.C.

== See also ==
- Bool (disambiguation)
- Boole (disambiguation)
- Boule (disambiguation)
- Pârâul Boului (disambiguation)
- Valea Boului (disambiguation)
