= Boule =

Boule may refer to:

== Ball games ==
- Boules, a collective term for games involving players throwing balls at a smaller target ball
  - Pétanque, a common variety originating in France and sometimes loosely called "boules" in English
  - Boule Lyonnaise, another boules game of French origin
  - Boule Bretonne, a boules game from Brittany
- Boule (gambling game), a game similar to roulette

== People ==
- Boule (community), an Akan people in Côte d'Ivoire, Africa
- Auguste-Louis-Désiré Boulé (1799–1865), French playwright
- Marcellin Boule (1861–1942), French palaeontologist

== Politics ==
- Boule (ancient Greece), a citizens' council appointed to run daily affairs of a city
- Hellenic Parliament, transliterated as Vouli or Boule from Greek

== Science and geography ==
- Boule (crystal), an ingot of synthetically produced crystal
- Boule (gene), an alias for the gene BOLL, responsible for sperm production in animals
- Boule Range, one of the Northern Continental Ranges in the Canadian Rocky Mountains

== Other uses ==
- The Boulé, or Sigma Pi Phi fraternity, the oldest fraternity for African Americans named with Greek letters
- Boule (bread), a round loaf of white bread
- Boule, in Chadian cuisine, a porridge

== See also ==
- Bole (disambiguation)
- Bool (disambiguation)
- Boole (disambiguation)
- Boul (disambiguation)
- Boule et Bill, Belgian comic strip
- Boulle (surname)
- Boully (surname)
- Bowl (disambiguation)
