= Narrow-gauge railways in Europe =

Europe inherited a diversity of rail gauges. Extensive narrow-gauge railway networks exist in Spain, Central Europe and Southeastern Europe.

== Austria ==
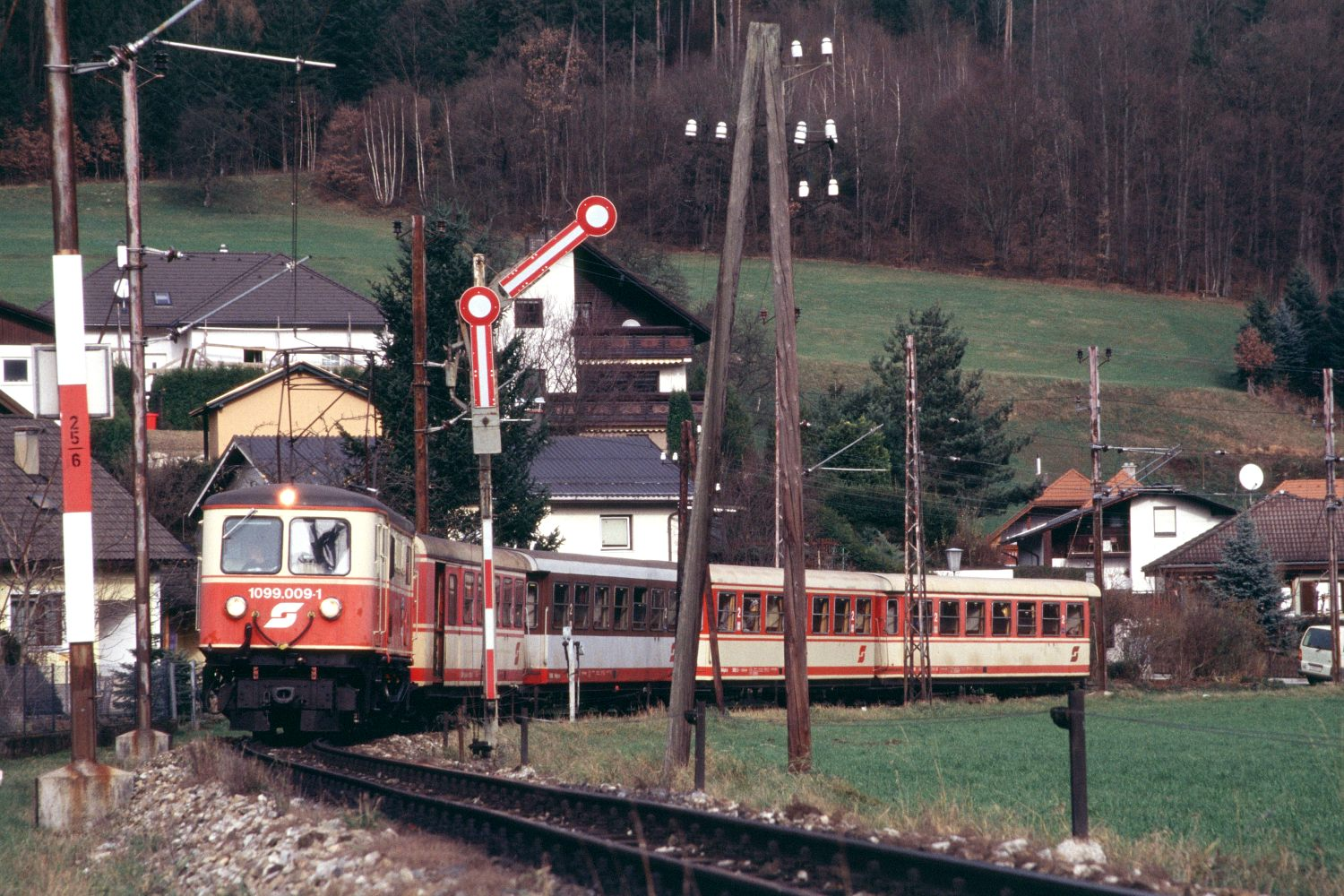
At the semaphore signal near Rabenstein an der Pielach

Some two dozen lines were built in 760 mm (2 ft 5 15/16 in) gauge, a few in 1,000 mm (3 ft 3 3/8 in) gauge. Two tram networks were built with the gauge of 900 mm (2 ft 11 7/16 in).

== Bulgaria ==
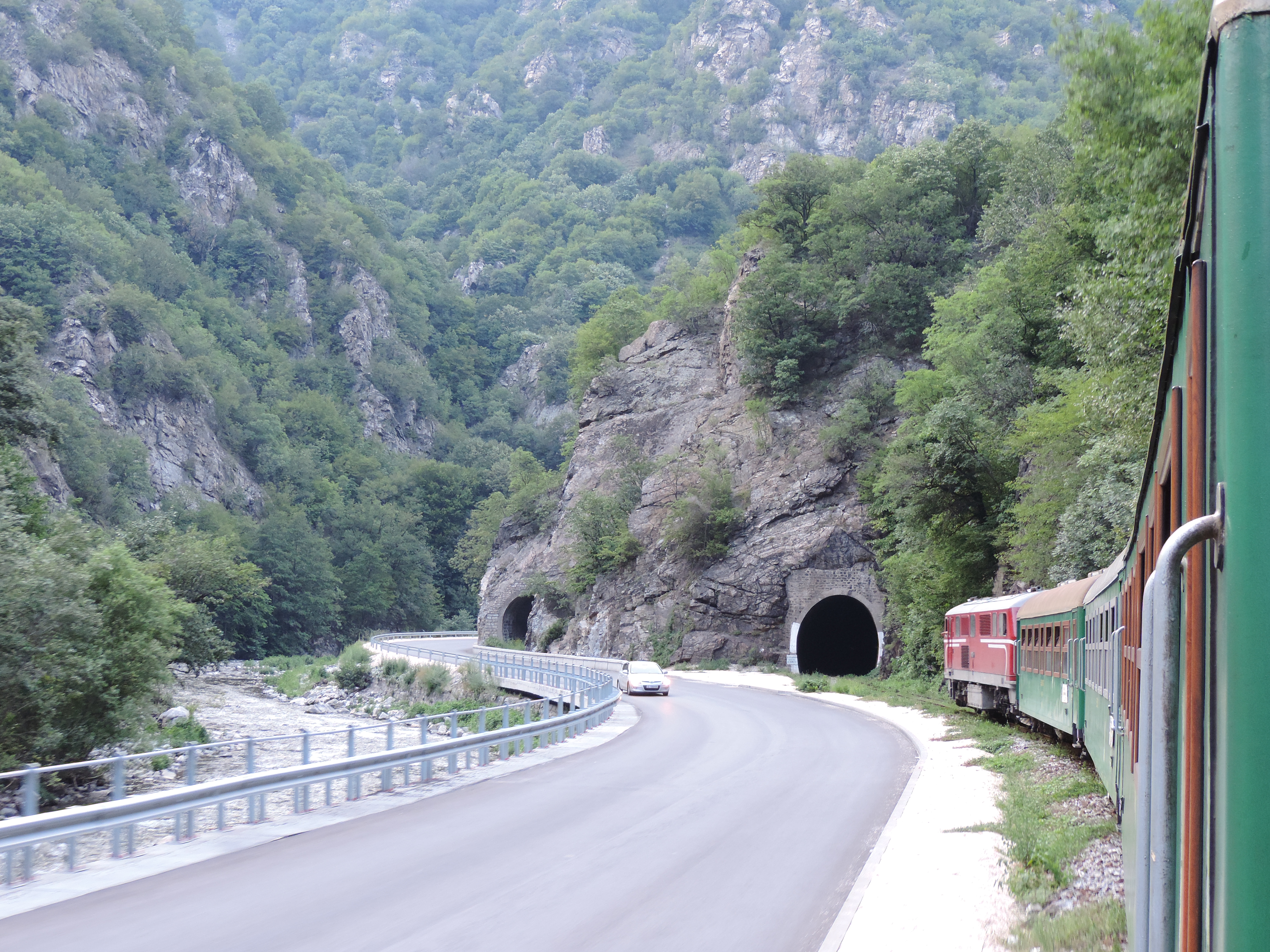
Septemvri–Dobrinishte narrow-gauge railway, Bulgaria

From the 19th into the early 20th there were many 600 mm (1 ft 11 5/8 in) and 760 mm (2 ft 5 15/16 in) gauge railways in existence Bulgaria, some were dismantled and others were converted to standard gauge.

The picturesque Septemvri–Dobrinishte narrow-gauge line is 125 km long and features 25 stations, 35 tunnels, many bridges, spiral loops. It is the only remaining 760 mm (2 ft 5 15/16 in) gauge railway in Bulgaria.

== Belarus ==
Some industrial narrow-gauge railways and a children's railway can still be found in Belarus particularly associated with the peat extraction industry.

- World War I 600 mm (1 ft 11 5/8 in) field railway from Dūkštas, (Lithuania) to Druja. After takeover by Poland, the PKP regauged the line to 750 mm (2 ft 5 1/2 in) in 1932. After World War II the large part of the line was in Belorussia, the railway closed in the 1970s.
- Minsk pioneer railway, 750 mm (2 ft 5 1/2 in) gauge, opened in 1955, 4 km.
- Rudensk peat railway, 750 mm (2 ft 5 1/2 in) gauge, opened in 1929, 111 km of which 40 km is operational

== Belgium ==
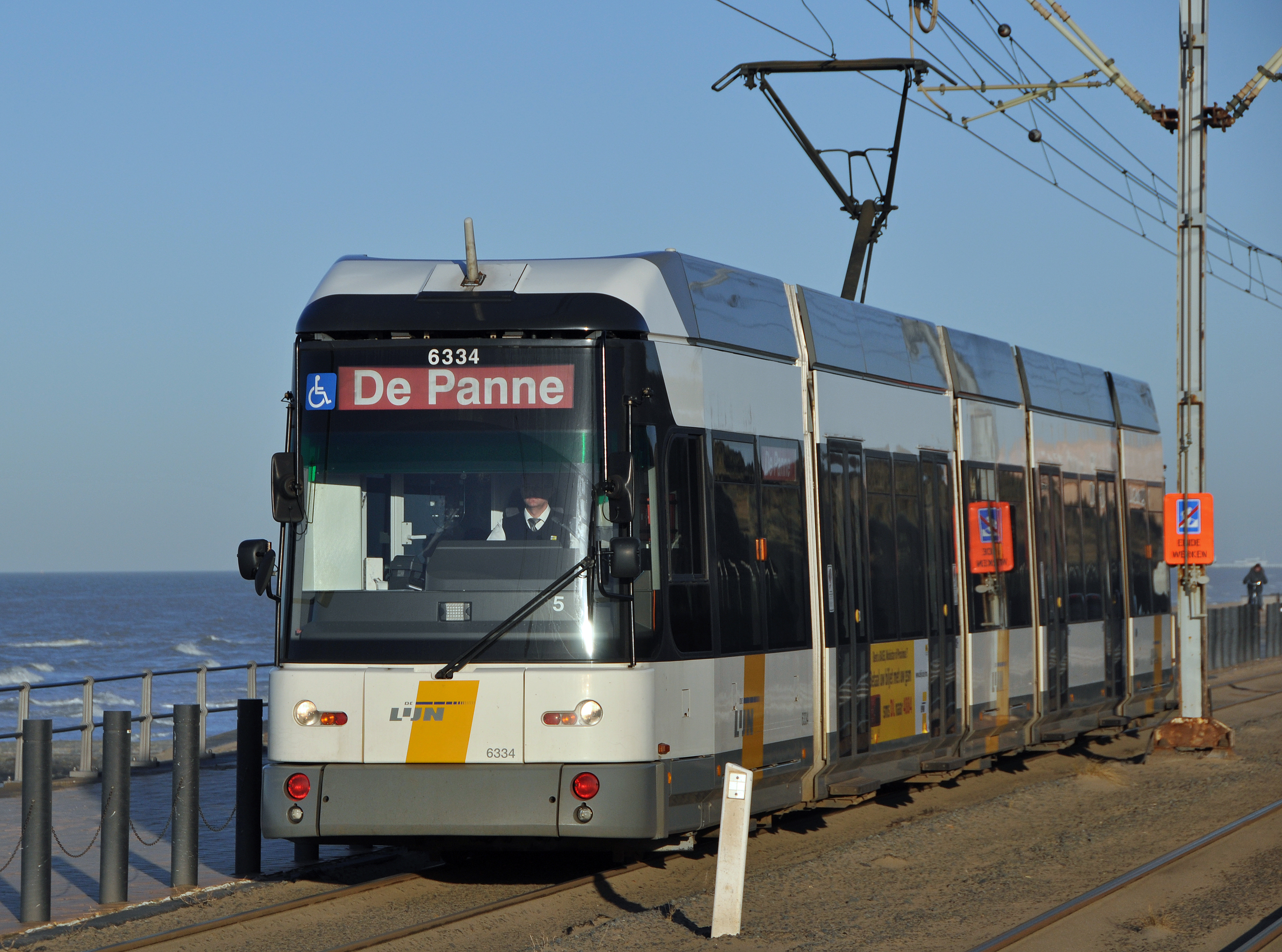
The coastal tramway in Belgium

The Vicinal or Buurtspoorwegen were a system of narrow-gauge local railways or tramways covering the whole country and having a greater routage than the mainline railway system. They were 1,000 mm (3 ft 3 3/8 in) gauge and the system included electrified city lines as well as rural lines using steam locomotives and railcars; half of the system was electrified. Many lines carried freight. Only the coastal line and two routes near Charleroi are still in commercial use, four museums hold significant collections of former SNCV/NMVB rolling stock, one of which is the ASVi museum in Thuin. The tramway networks in Antwerp and Ghent are also metre gauge.

The Stoomcentrum Maldegem has a 600 mm (1 ft 11 5/8 in) gauge line laid on the former standard-gauge trackbed to Donk.

== Bosnia and Herzegovina ==
Until the 1970s, Bosnia and Herzegovina had an extensive 760 mm (2 ft 5 15/16 in) gauge network exceeding 1500 km.

== Croatia ==
Croatia had three Bosnian gauge (760 mm (2 ft 5 15/16 in)) railways, a 760 mm tram and some 600 mm (1 ft 11 5/8 in) gauge mining railways.

== Czech Republic ==
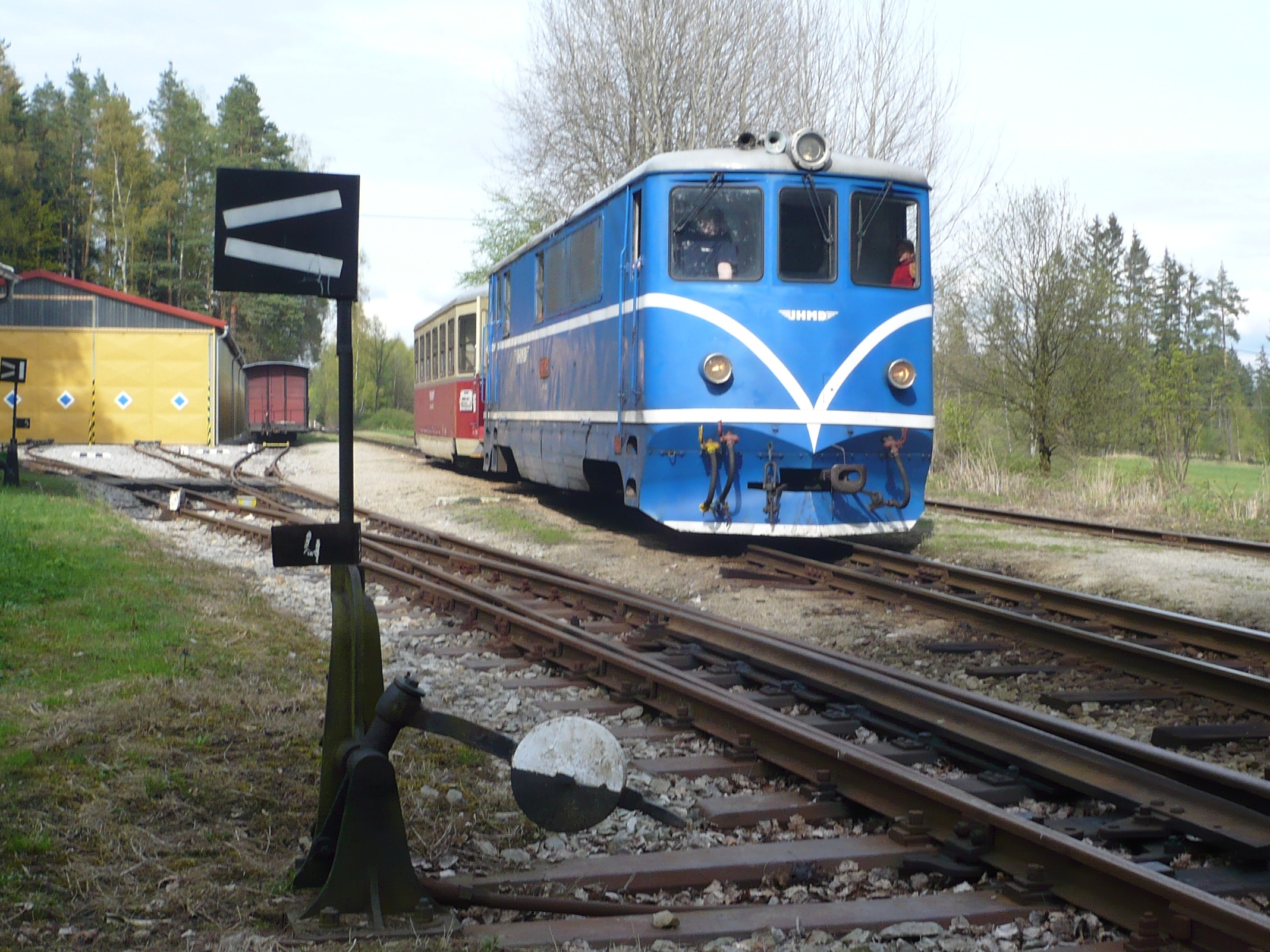
T47.015 with train from Obrataň to Jindřichův Hradec

Several lines were built in the 19th century. The most notable lines are Jindřichův Hradec–Nová Bystřice/Obrataň and Třemešná ve Slezsku–Osoblaha, which are still in operation.

== Denmark ==
A few narrow-gauge lines were built in Denmark, the majority in 1,000 mm (3 ft 3 3/8 in) gauge. Most railway lines in Denmark were built with standard gauge from the beginning, since the country was fairly densely populated in the 19th century.

== Estonia ==
All Estonian narrow-gauge railways were built at the gauge of 750 mm (2 ft 5 1/2 in). Four museum lines and some industrial peat railways survive. The tram network of Estonian capital city Tallinn has the gauge of 1067 mm (3 ft 6 in).

== Finland ==
The vast majority of Finnish narrow-gauge railways were owned and operated by private companies. There are only a few instances where narrow-gauge railways were in direct connection with each other, and those interchanges did not last for long. The railways never formed a regional rail traffic network, but were only focused on maintaining connections between the national broad-gauge railway network and the off-line industries.

== France ==
The French National Railways used to run a considerable number of 1,000 mm (3 ft 3 3/8 in) lines, extensive 600 mm (1 ft 11 5/8 in) gauge lines were also built for the sugar-beet industry in the north often using ex-military equipment after the First World War. Decauville was a famous French manufacturer of industrial narrow-gauge railway equipment and equipped one of the most extensive regional 600 mm (1 ft 11 5/8 in) narrow-gauge railway, the Chemins de fer du Calvados. Corsica has a narrow-gauge network through highly mountainous terrain.

== Germany ==
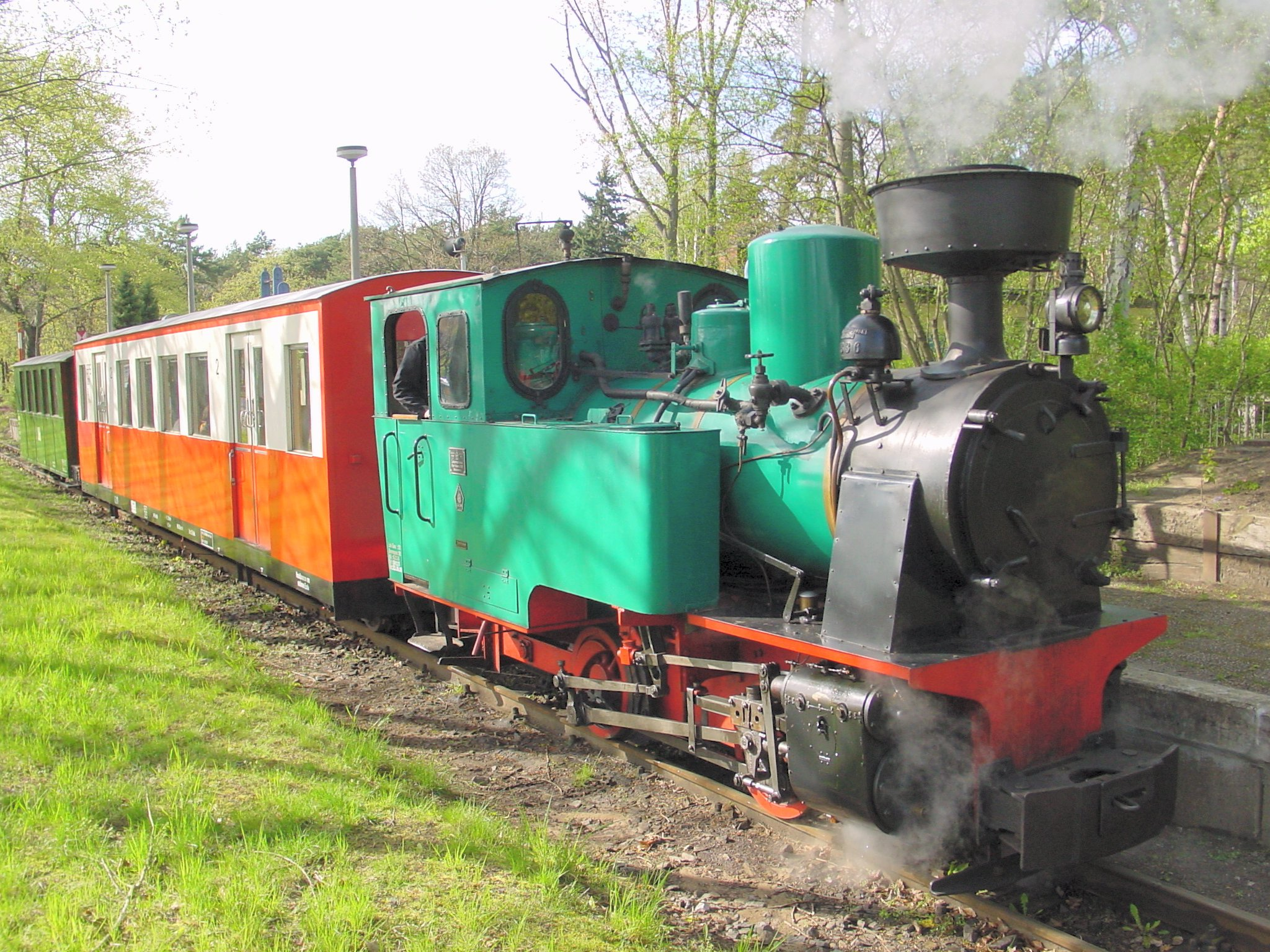
600 mm (1 ft 11 5/8 in) Berlin narrow-gauge railway / Berliner Parkeisenbahn

A number of narrow-gauge lines survive, largely as a consequence of German reunification, in the former East Germany where some of them form part of the public transport system as active commercial carriers. Most extensive of those still employing steam traction is the Harz mountain group of metre-gauge lines, the Harzer Schmalspurbahnen. Other notable lines are the Fichtelberg Railway (Ore Mountains), the Zittau-Oybin-Jonsdorf line in Saxony, the Mollibahn and the Rügensche Kleinbahn on the Isle of Rügen on the Baltic coast and the Radebeul-Radeburg line, Weisseritztalbahn in the suburbs of Dresden. Although most rely on the tourist trade, in some areas they provide significant employment as steam traction is particularly labour-intensive.

In the Western part of Germany, Selfkantbahn (close to Heinsberg near Aachen) and Brohltalbahn (near Linz/Rhine) are the best known ones, offering services in summer weekends.

== Greece ==
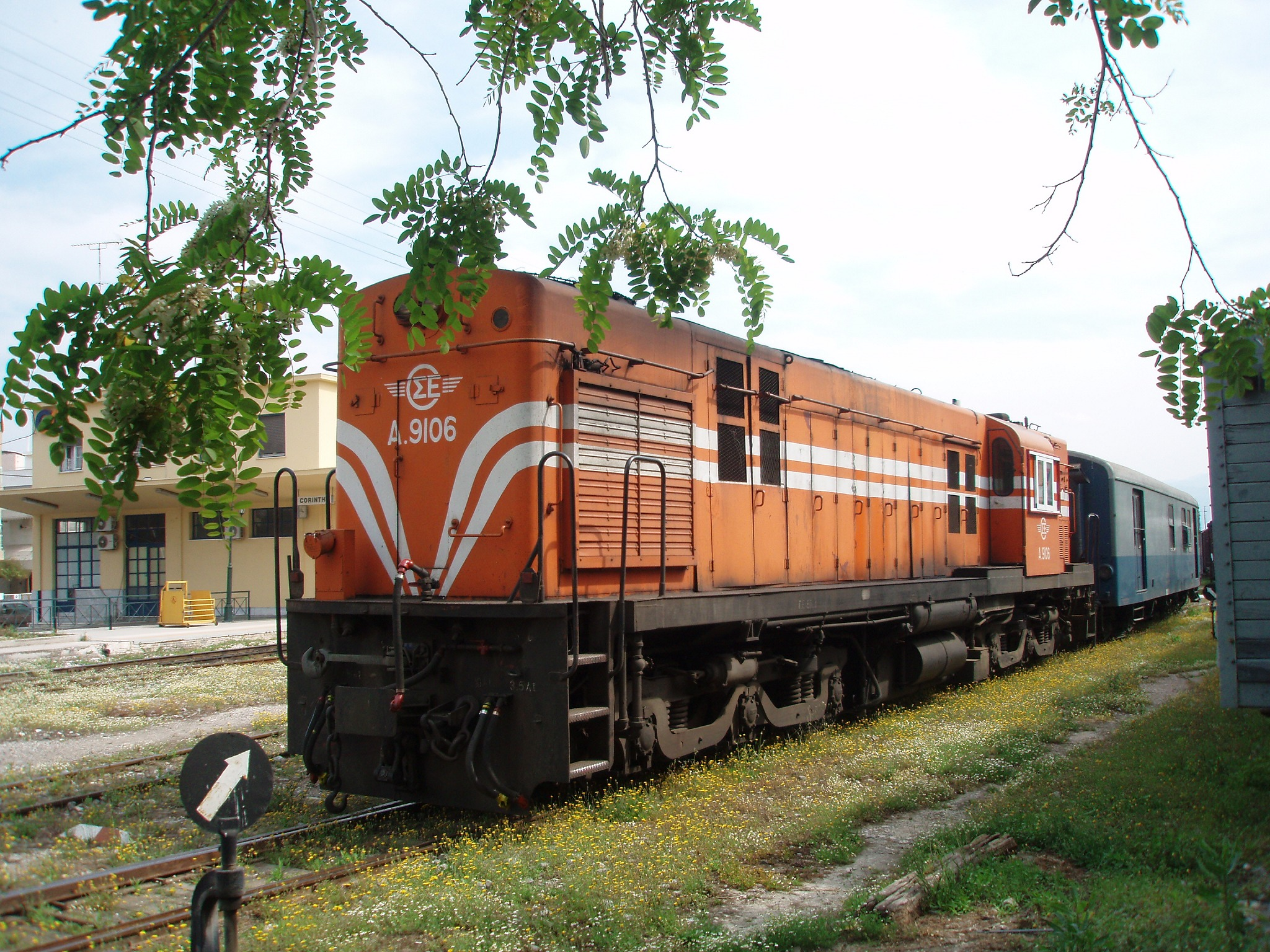
1,000 mm (3 ft 3 3/8 in) ALCo locomotive of Hellenic State Railways at Corinth Old Railway Station

The Peloponnese narrow-gauge network length is about 914 km. Of this, metre gauge is used for 892 km. This is the network that connects major cities in the Peloponnese. The remaining 22 km form the Diakofton-Kalavryta Rack Railway, which uses 750 mm (2 ft 5 1/2 in) gauge. All passenger service on the metre-gauge network in the Peloponnese (except the Diakofto Kalavrita Railway) was suspended in 2011.

There was also a metre-gauge network in Thessaly. This has now been replaced with single track standard-gauge lines from Volos to Larissa and Palaiofarsalos to Kalampaka. However, the old narrow-gauge tracks remain in place between Velestino and Palaiofarsalos via Aerino, so that occasional special excursion trains use them.

Another small railway which uses narrow gauge 600 mm (1 ft 11 5/8 in) is the Mt. Pelion railway,

A metric line network existed in Attica, operated by Attica Railways and later by SPAP. The line ran from the center of Athens to Kifissia with a branch from Heraklion to Lavrion, finally closed in 1957.

There were also many industrial and military railways in the past.

== Hungary ==
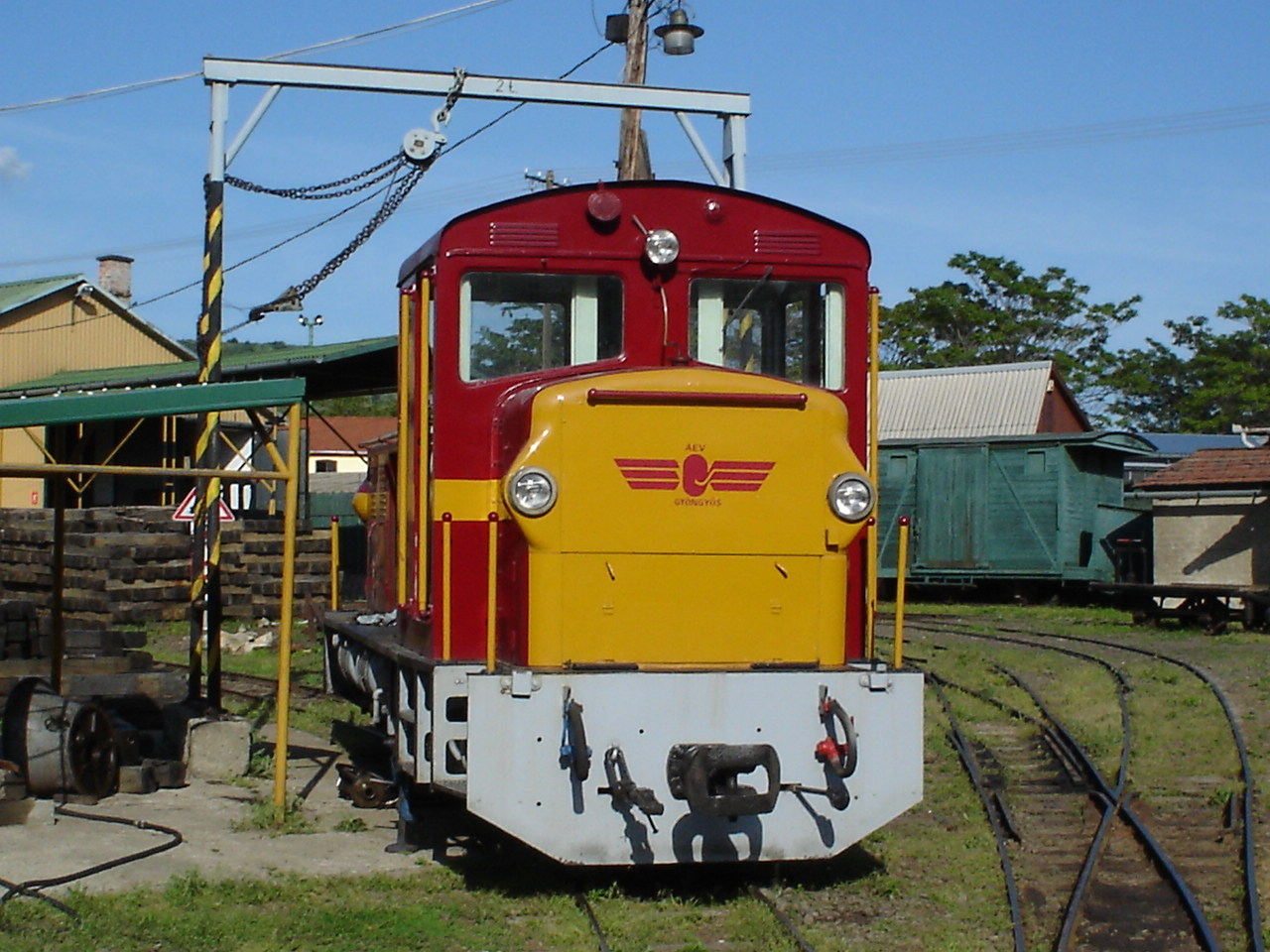
Mátra Railway in Gyöngyös

The former Austria-Hungary empire boasted a narrow-gauge network thousands of kilometres in length, most of it using Bosnian gauge 760 mm (2 ft 5 15/16 in) or 600 mm (1 ft 11 5/8 in) gauge, constructed between 1870 and 1920. Landlords, mines, agricultural and forest estates established their own branch lines which, as they united into regional networks, increasingly played a role in regional passenger traffic. In 1968 the Communist government started to implement a policy to dismantle the narrow-gauge network in favour of road traffic. Since the 1990s a patchwork of railways was gradually taken over by associations and forest managements for tourist purposes. State Railways operated narrow-gauge railways at Nyíregyháza and Kecskemét that played a role in regional transport until December 2009.

== Iceland ==
No passenger railways have ever been built in Iceland, but the 900 mm gauge Reykjavík Harbour Railway is probably the best known of Iceland's former narrow-gauge lines.

== Ireland ==
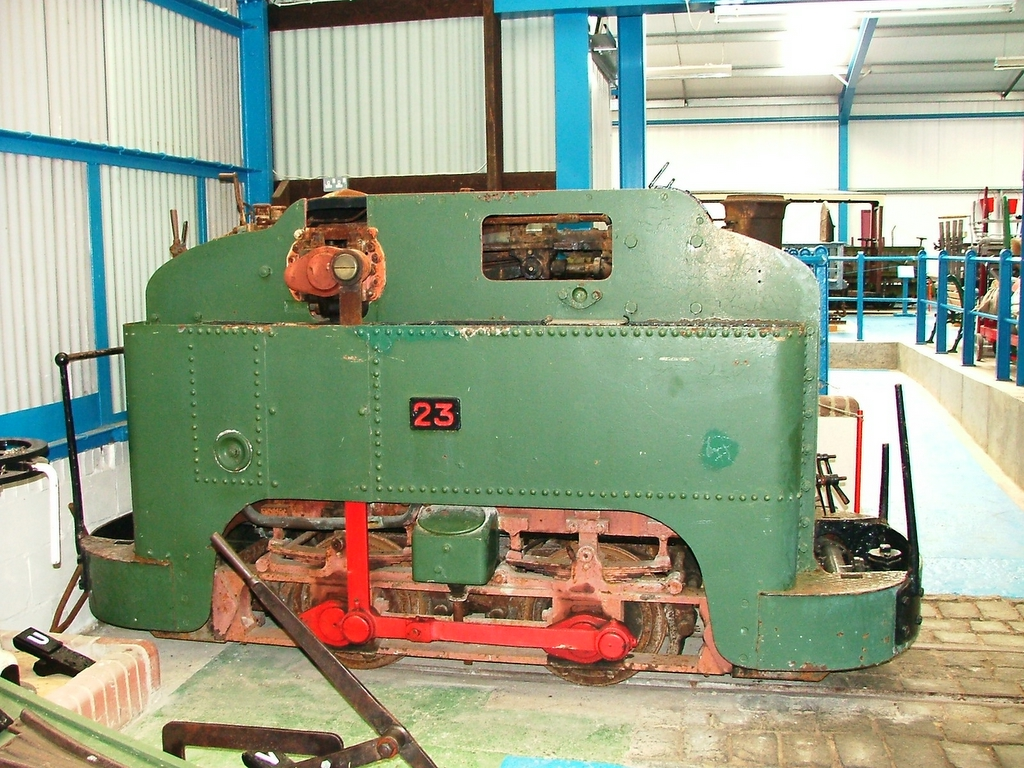
Guinness brewery locomotive

Several 3 ft (914 mm) narrow-gauge systems once existed in Ireland. In County Donegal an extensive network existed, with two companies operating from Derry – the Londonderry & Lough Swilly Railway (L&LSR) and the County Donegal Railways (CDRJC). Well known was the West Clare Railway – in County Clare, which saw diesel locomotion before closure. The Cavan & Leitrim Railway (C&LR) operated in what is now the border area of County Cavan and County Leitrim. Some smaller narrow-gauge routes also had existed in County Antrim and also County Cork – notably the Cork Blackrock & Passage Railway – had been removed.

Apart from small heritage venues, the Irish narrow gauge today only survives in the bogs of the Midlands as part of Bord na Móna's extensive industrial network for transporting harvested peat to distribution centres or power plants.

== Italy ==
Narrow-gauge railways in Italy are (or were) mainly built with 950 mm (3 ft 1 3/8 in) gauge, with some 1,000 mm (3 ft 3 3/8 in) gauge lines in the north, Bosnian gauge 760 mm (2 ft 5 15/16 in) in the north-east and a few other gauges.

== Isle of Man ==
Both main railways in the Isle of Man are of 3 ft (914 mm) gauge. The Isle of Man Steam Railway to the southwest is operated largely as a tourist attraction but the Manx Electric Railway to the northeast is a commercially operated railway system though its operation is closer to that of a tramway than a railway. The Snaefell Mountain Railway, climbs the island's main peak and has a gauge of 3 ft 6 in (1,067 mm); it is the sole operating Fell Incline Railway System in the world.

== Latvia ==
Around 1935 narrow-gauge railways consisted of 536 km (335 miles) of 600 mm (1 ft 11 5/8 in) gauge, 432 km (270 miles) of 750 mm (2 ft 5 1/2 in) gauge and 48 km (30 miles) of 1,000 mm (3 ft 3 3/8 in) gauge.

One public, one museum and some industrial peat railways survive.

== Lithuania ==
158.8 km of 750 mm (2 ft 5 1/2 in) narrow-gauge lines remain, although only 68.4 km of them (serving five stations) are regularly used, employing 12 locomotives. They are included in the Registry of Immovable Cultural Heritage Sites of Lithuania.

== Netherlands ==
Numerous industrial narrow-gauge lines were built for peat extraction, clay extraction for brickworks and construction sites. The dominant gauge for industrial lines was 700 mm (2 ft 3 9/16 in), contrary to the 600 mm (1 ft 11 5/8 in) gauge used in neighbouring countries.

Nowadays, a lot of this industrial rail heritage is preserved in museums or in theme parks, such as the Efteling Steam Train Company.

A lot of tram lines were also constructed in narrow gauge, the majority in 3 ft 6 in (1,067 mm) gauge.

== Norway ==
Thamshavn Line Locomotive 3, relocated to the NTNU campus in Trondheim, Norway

In Norway, a number of main lines were in the 19th century built with narrow gauge, 3 ft 6 in (1,067 mm). Some secondary railways also had this gauge. These railways have been rebuilt to standard gauge or closed down. Some private railways had 750 mm (2 ft 5 1/2 in) and one had 1,000 mm (3 ft 3 3/8 in). A few railways partly still are operated as museum railways.

== Poland ==
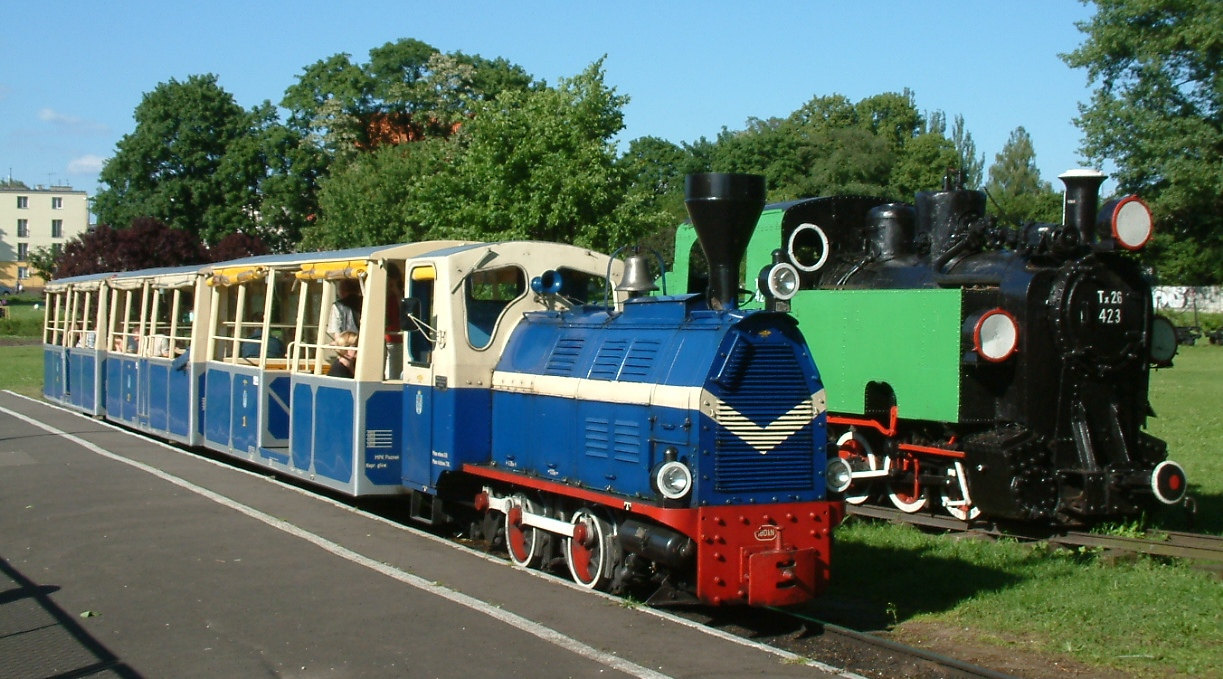
Kolejka Parkowa Maltanka – 600 mm (1 ft 11 5/8 in) gauge in Poznań

There are hundreds of kilometres of 600 mm (1 ft 11 5/8 in), 750 mm (2 ft 5 1/2 in), 785 mm (2 ft 6 29/32 in), and 1,000 mm (3 ft 3 3/8 in) narrow-gauge lines in Poland. The metre-gauge lines are mostly found in the northwest part of the country in Pomerania, while 785 mm (2 ft 6 29/32 in) lines are found only in the Upper Silesia region. 750 mm (2 ft 5 1/2 in) is the most commonly used narrow gauge.

In the past, there have also been 760 mm (2 ft 5 15/16 in), 800 mm (2 ft 7 1/2 in) and 900 mm (2 ft 11 7/16 in) lines.

== Portugal ==
Portugal once had hundreds of kilometres of 1,000 mm (3 ft 3 3/8 in) gauge railways.

Most of them were closed or converted to broad gauge.

== Romania ==
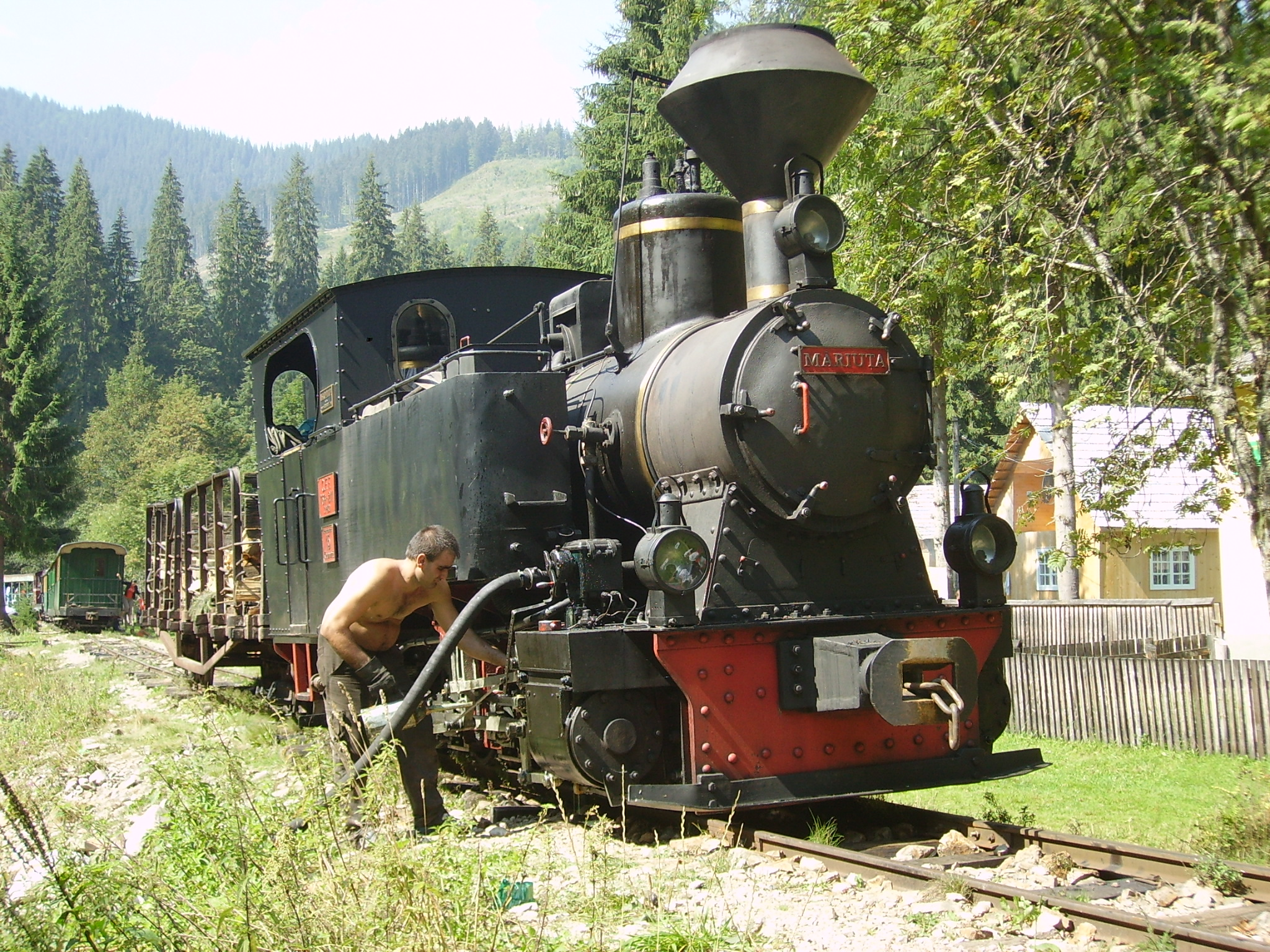
Vaser Valley Mocăniţă Mariuţa

Romanian narrow-gauge tracks usually use a 760 mm (2 ft 5 15/16 in) gauge, though there were also some 700 mm (2 ft 3 9/16 in) gauge locomotives manufactured at Reşita. Several old narrow-gauge railways in Romania are being renovated for tourist purposes: the one in the Vaser Valley (Maramureș County) is now well known, the line from Abrud to Campeni is sporadically operating and other renovation projects have made tentative steps and may commence regular operations in the near future, such as the Agnita railway line, which has been declared as a historical monument and is now starting to be restored by volunteers. Other forestry narrow-gauge lines with sporadically steam traffic are CFF Moldoviţa (Suceava County)or CFF Covasna-Comandău (Covasna County). More information can be found under "mocăniţă", the term by which such railways are often called in Romanian.

== Russia ==
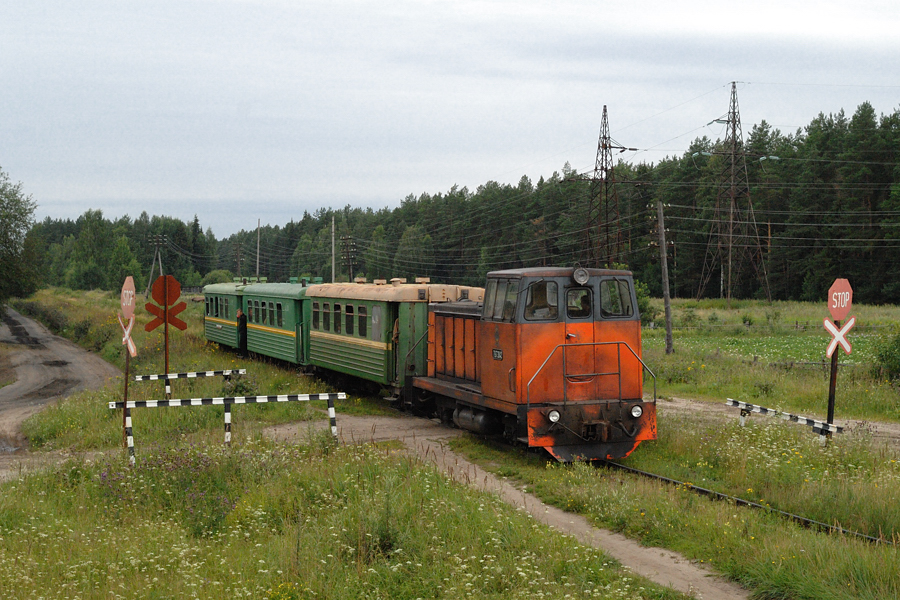
Diesel Locomotive TU7A – No.3042

The Imperial Russian narrow-gauge railway track gauge was 3 ft 6 in (1,067 mm), the current track gauge is predominantly 750 mm (2 ft 5 1/2 in).

Of the Russian 3 ft 6 in (1,067 mm) railways, only the Sakhalin Railway still exists. This railway was built by Japan who occupied southern Sakhalin after the Russo-Japanese War. The network was extended to the northern part of the island in the Soviet era. It was the last Russian railway in 3 ft 6 in (1,067 mm) and is currently converted to 1,520 mm (4 ft 11 27/32 in).

There are numerous 750 mm (2 ft 5 1/2 in) railways serving local industries and communities.

== Serbia ==
The narrow-gauge railway line in Mokra Gora on the northern slopes of mountain Zlatibor in Serbia climbs a 300-metre ascent using an unusual loop in the form of the figure 8 – the popular "Šargan Eight".

== Slovakia ==
Bratislava municipal transport system uses 1,000 mm (3 ft 3 3/8 in) gauge for trams, while Košice transport system uses standard gauge 1,435 mm (4 ft 8 1/2 in). Railways, however use standard gauge 1,435 mm (4 ft 8 1/2 in) making Bratislava tram and railways networks incompatible with each other. There is a discussion regarding transforming Bratislava's tram gauge to standard gauge to allow trams to use the railways tracks to increase transportation capabilities of Bratislava's public transportation system. The most notable tourist lines in operation are the 760 mm (2 ft 5 15/16 in) gauge Čiernohronská železnica and Oravsko-kysucká lesná železnica – Vychylovka. Another notable narrow-gauge tracks include: the Štrbské Pleso - Štrba rack railway and the Tatra Electric Railway (both 1,000 mm (3 ft 3 3/8 in) gauge) in the Tatra Mountains and the 760 mm (2 ft 5 15/16 in) gauge railway from Trenčianska Teplá to Trenčianske Teplice.

== Slovenia ==
A steam locomotive of the Parenzana

The narrow-gauge railway line was built in the valley of Dravinja, connecting Poljčane–Slovenske Konjice–Zreče (dismantled 1962).

In formerly Italian Istria, a narrow-gauge railway line called Parenzana, a.k.a. Trieste–Buje–Parenzo, connected Trieste (Italy) – Capodistria Koper, Isola d'Istria Izola (Slovenia) – Parenzo Poreč (Croatia) (dismantled).

== Spain ==
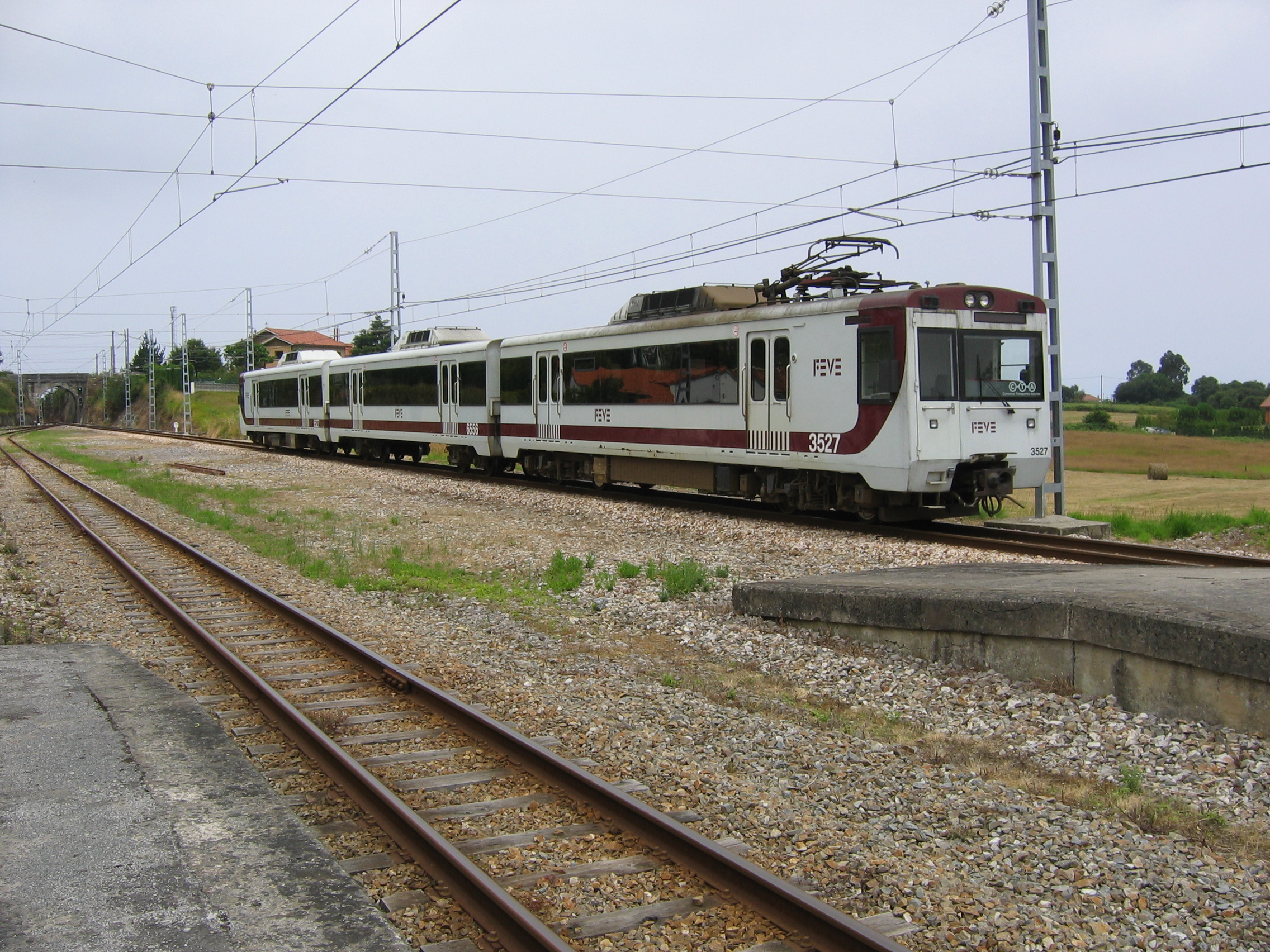
Electric unit 3500, operated by FEVE, arriving to the Muros de Nalón station, on the way to Oviedo

In Spain there is an extensive 1,250 km (780 mi) system of 1,000 mm (3 ft 3 3/8 in) gauge railways, in the north of the country, operated by Renfe (until 2013 by FEVE) and EuskoTren. The former FEVE and EuskoTren form the longest narrow-gauge network in Europe.

Near Madrid, on the mountain range of Guadarrama runs a mountain train through a short but extremely sinuous track, operated by Renfe.

Separate metre-gauge railways are operated by the FGC (Ferrocarrils de la Generalitat de Catalunya, Catalan regional government railways), the FGV (Ferrocarrils de la Generalitat Valenciana, Valencian regional government railways).

The SFM (Serveis Ferroviaris de Mallorca) operates on the island of Mallorca. Also on the island of Mallorca, the FS (Ferrocarril de Sóller) operates a 3 ft (914 mm) gauge electrified railway and connecting tramway.

== Sweden ==
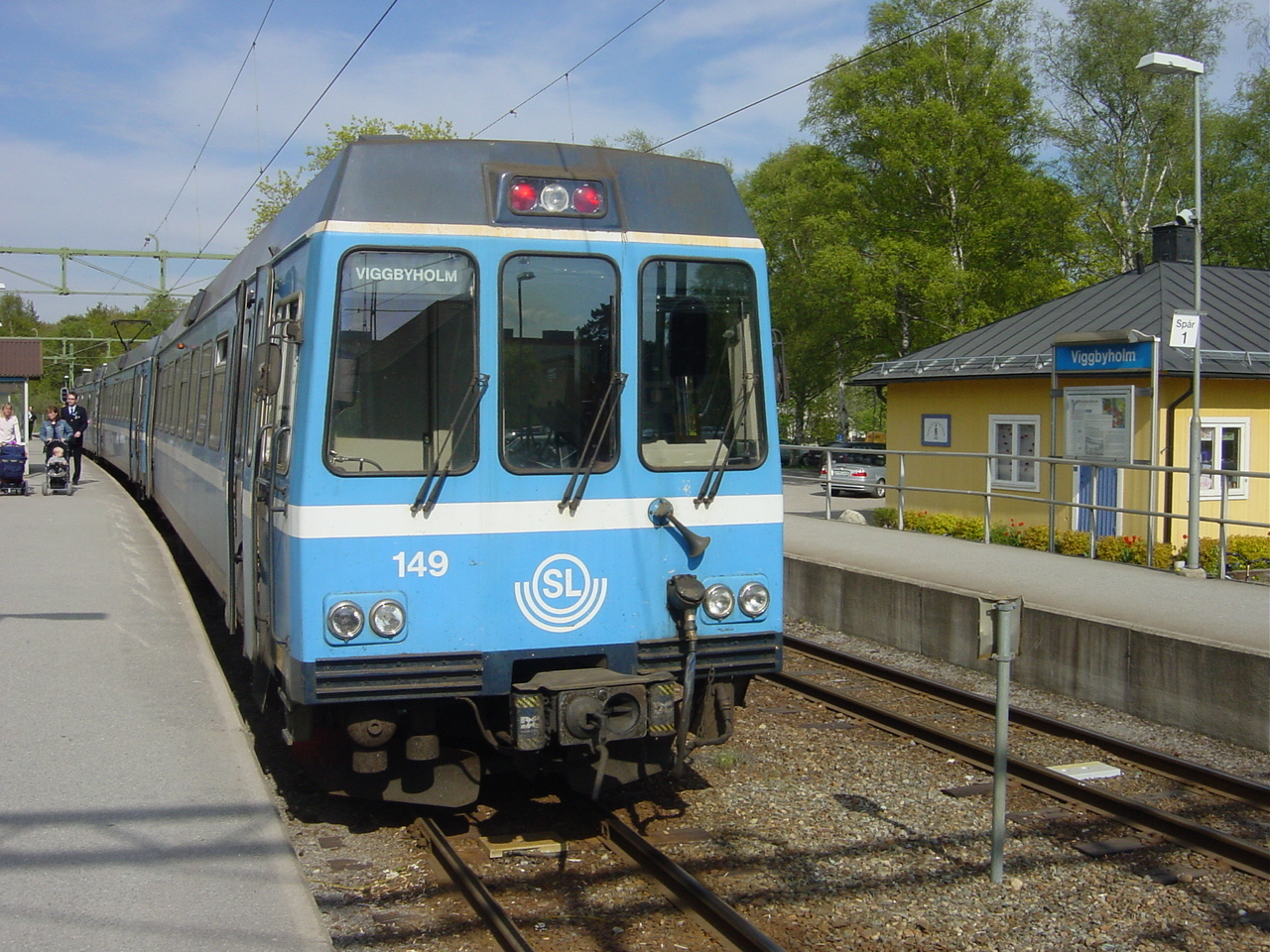
The Roslagsbanan railway, Stockholm

Sweden once had some fairly extensive narrow-gauge networks, but most narrow-gauge railways are now closed. Some were converted to standard gauge (the latest one the line between Berga and Kalmar in the 1970s) and some remain as heritage railways. The most common narrow gauge, 891 mm (2 ft 11 3/32 in) (3 Swedish feet), existed only in Sweden. A smaller 3 ft 6 in (1,067 mm) gauge network existed, and 600 mm (1 ft 11 5/8 in) gauge was used mostly by smaller, industrial railways. Still other but lesser used gauges in the country were 802 mm (2 ft 7 9/16 in), 1,188 mm (3 ft 10 25/32 in) and 1,217 mm (3 ft 11 29/32 in), all converted or removed.

== Switzerland ==
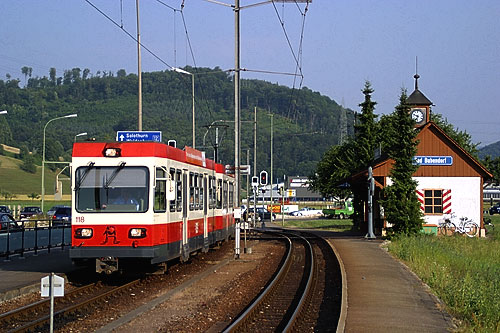
A train at Bad Bubendorf station on the Waldenburg railway

Switzerland boasts extensive networks of 1,000 mm (3 ft 3 3/8 in) metre-gauge railways, many of which interchange traffic (most prominent is the Rhaetian Railway). The Jungfraubahn terminates at the highest station in Europe. Dual gauge (combined metre- and standard-gauge trackway) also exists in some areas. Also, nearly all street tramways in Switzerland are metre gauge.

Some railway lines are of a narrower gauge, for example the 800 mm (2 ft 7 1/2 in) Wengernalp railway in the Bernese Oberland. The 750 mm (2 ft 5 1/2 in) gauge Waldenburg railway between Liestal and Waldenburg was converted to metre gauge between 2021 and 2022.

== Ukraine ==
There are three operating passenger 750 mm (2 ft 5 1/2 in) gauge lines in Ukraine: Vynohradiv–Khmilnyk (in Zakarpattia Oblast), Rudnytsia–Holovanivsk (Haivoron line in Vinnytsia Oblast and Kirovohrad Oblast, 130 km or 81 mi), Antonivka–Zarichne (in Rivne Oblast).

Various Children's railways of 750 mm (2 ft 5 1/2 in) gauge are operational.

== United Kingdom ==
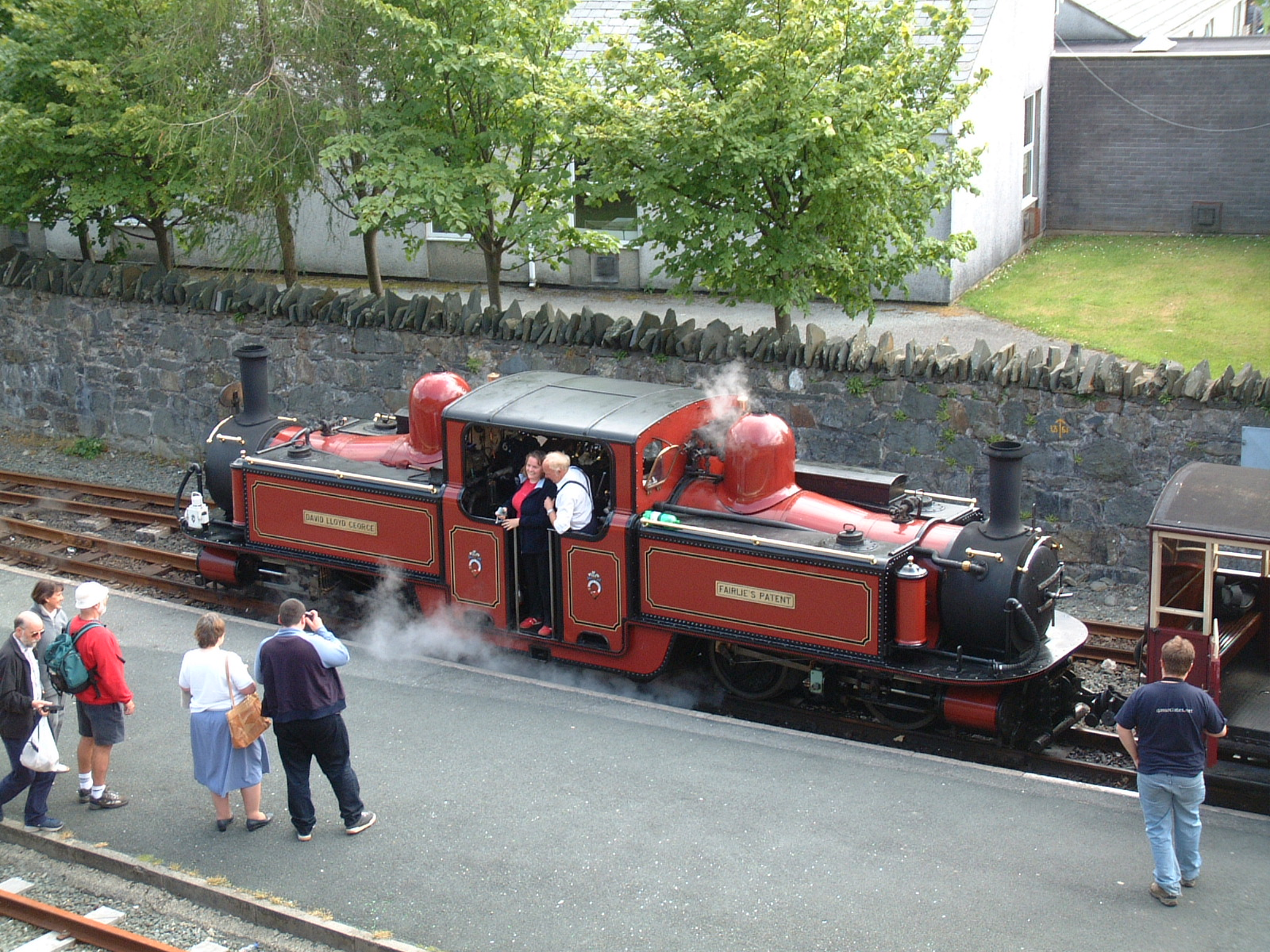
Double Fairlie locomotive David Lloyd George on the Ffestiniog Railway.

The United Kingdom once had a large number of narrow-gauge railways which were mostly isolated from each other. The first locomotive-hauled railway in the world was the narrow-gauge Penydarren Tramway in south Wales. Most of the lines were originally built to haul minerals or agricultural products over short distances, though many also carried passengers. The longest passenger line was the combined Welsh Highland and Ffestiniog railways at 36 miles or 58 kilometres. The Welsh Highland was completely re-opened in 2011 giving a total length (together with the Ffestiniog) of about 40 miles (64 km).

Only a few of these lines survive as commercial common carriers. The great majority of the remaining narrow-gauge lines operate purely as tourist attractions, and a number of new narrow-gauge tourist lines have been built in recent years. The sole passenger-carrying exception is the Glasgow Subway, an underground metro line that operates on a 4 ft (1,219 mm) gauge. The Talyllyn Railway holds the distinction of being the first railway in Britain to be passed by an act of parliament for carrying passengers, and the first railway in the world of any gauge to be preserved and run entirely by volunteers. In addition a few private industrial narrow-gauge railways remain, mainly serving the coal and peat extraction industries.

Amongst the most well-known narrow-gauge lines in Britain are the Ffestiniog – one of the earliest railway organisations in the world – the Vale of Rheidol, and the Welshpool & Llanfair in Wales, the Lynton & Barnstaple, Amerton Railway, the Ravenglass and Eskdale and the Romney, Hythe and Dymchurch, in England. Unique amongst British railways is the rack-and-pinion Snowdon Mountain Railway which climbs to just below the summit of Wales' highest peak.
