= Bool =

Bool may refer to:

== People ==
- Al Bool (1897–1981), American baseball player
- Henry Bool (1846–1922), American anarchist
- Sarah Bool (born 1987/8), British politician

== Places ==
- Bool (Ludhiana East), a village in Punjab, India
- Bool, Tagbilaran, a barangay (suburb) in the Philippines
- Bool Island, Sulawesi, Indonesia
- Bool Lagoon, a freshwater lagoon in South Australia
- Bool Lagoon Game Reserve, a protected area in South Australia
- Bool Lagoon, South Australia, a locality
- Mount Bool, Antarctica

== Computer programming ==
- Boolean data type in computer programming

== See also ==
- Boole (disambiguation)
- Boul (disambiguation)
- Boule (disambiguation)
