= Puru River =

Puru River may refer to:

- Izvorul Purului, tributary of the Lotru in Vâlcea County, Romania
- Puru, tributary of the Vaser in Maramureș County, Romania
