= Pârâul Boului =

Pârâul Boului may refer to the following rivers in Romania:

- Pârâul Boului (Moldovița), a tributary of the Moldovița in Suceava County
- Pârâul Boului, a tributary of the Briheni in Bihor County
- Pârâul Boului, the alternative name of Valea Boului (Buzău)

== See also ==
- Boul (disambiguation)
- Valea Boului (disambiguation)
