= Mocăniță =

Type of narrow-gauge railway in Romania

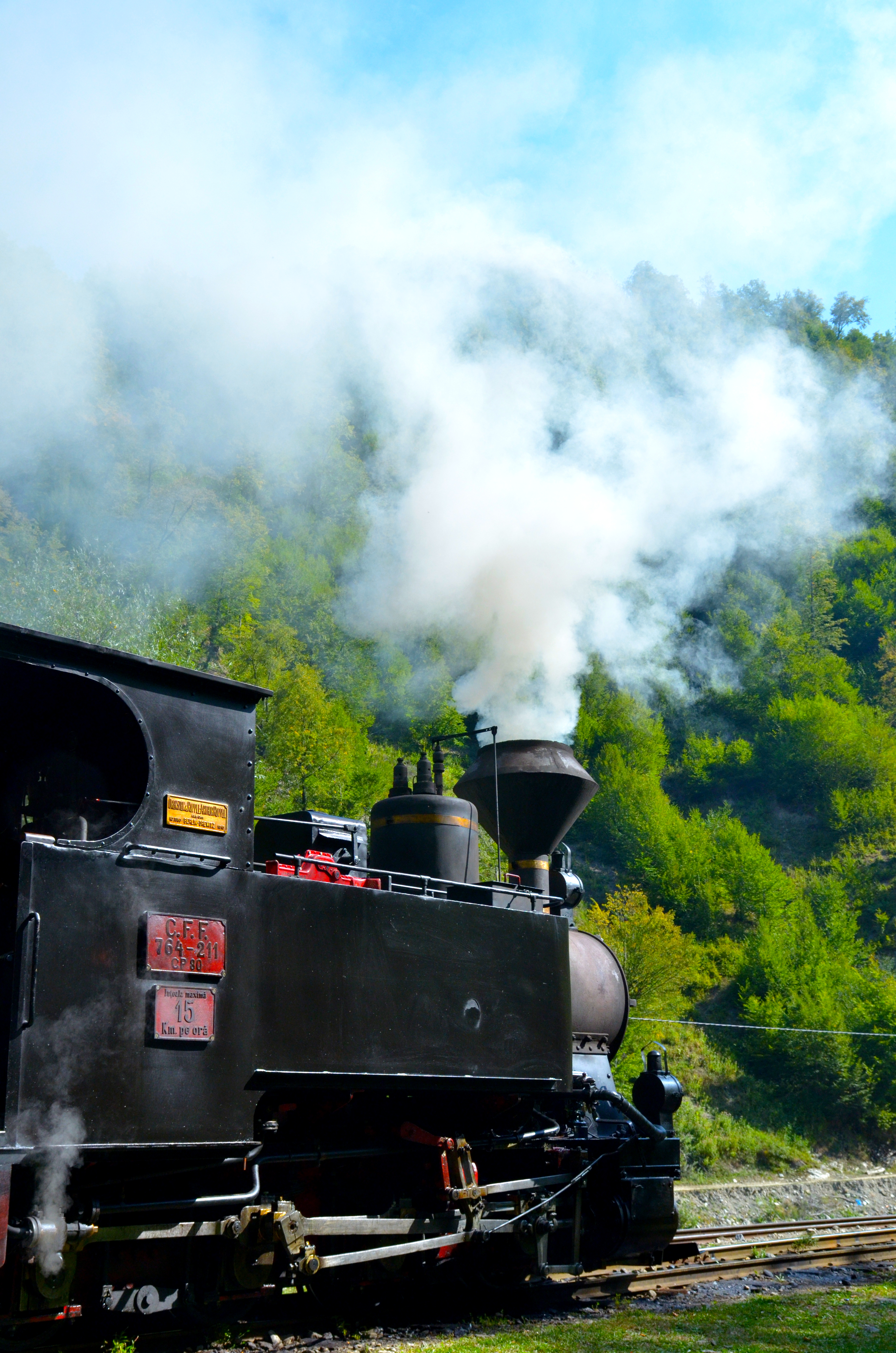
Mocăniță on Valea Vaserului

A Mocăniță (Romanian pronunciation: [mokəˈnit͡sə]) is a narrow-gauge railway in Romania, most notably in Maramureș, Transylvania, and Bukovina. Archetypically, they are situated in mountainous areas and the locomotives operating on them (which themselves can also be referred to as mocănițăs) are steam-powered. These railways were built for cargo and passenger service, but fell into disrepair over the years. Some are now being rehabilitated for the purposes of tourism.

== Etymology ==
The word mocăniță is a term of endearment, derived from the Romanian word mocan, meaning shepherd or one who lives in the mountains, and suffixed as feminine and diminutive in keeping with the tradition of naming conveyances and indicating small size. It's also been suggested that it means "coffee machine", as one of the little locomotives is reminiscent of one of these in action.

== Vaser Valley Mocănița ==
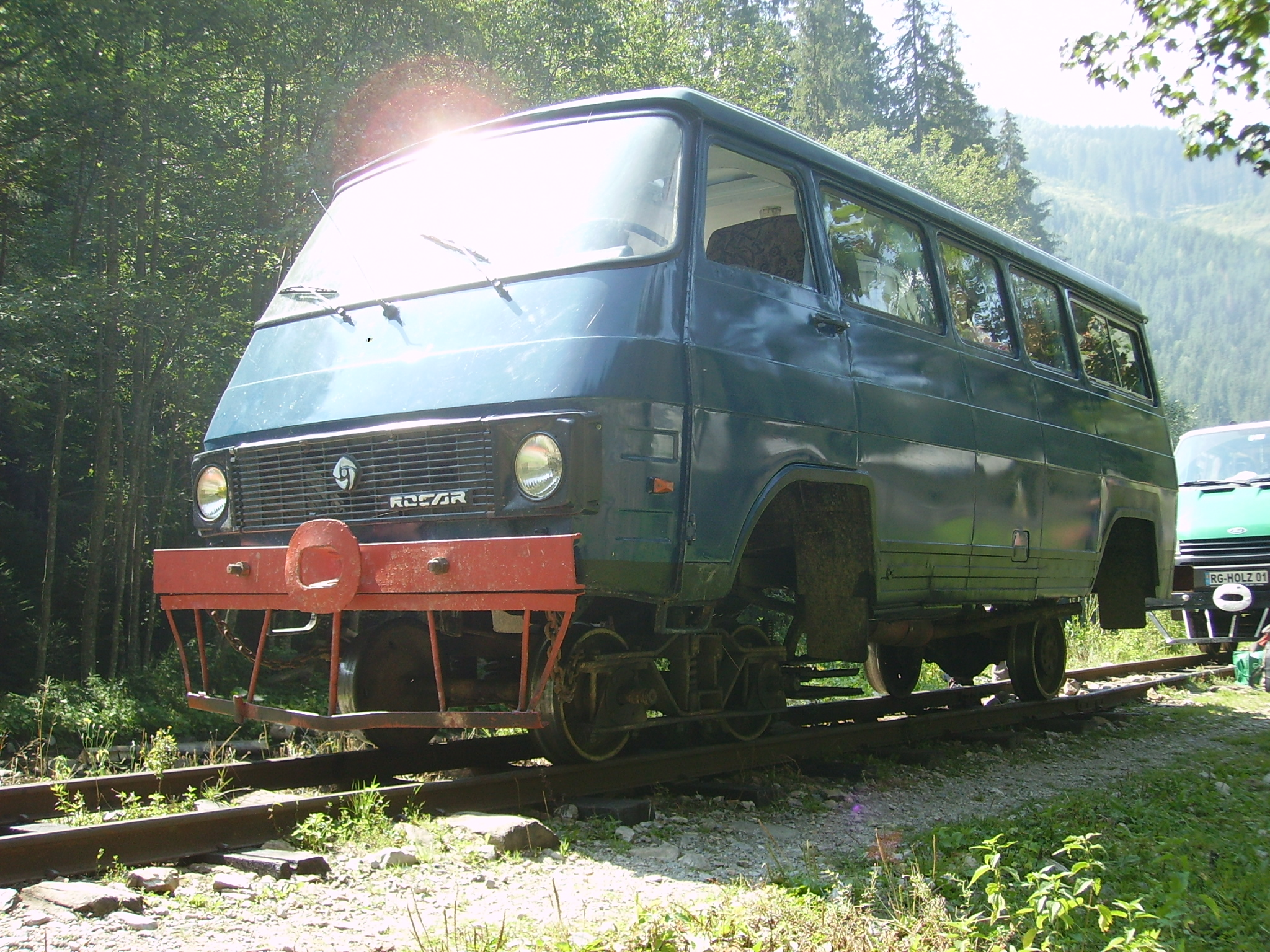
A Rocar minivan on rails

The most well-known mocăniță runs in the Vaser Valley in Maramureș County. This railway was constructed in the period 1933-1935 and uses a gauge of 760 mm (2 ft 5 15/16 in). It was partially destroyed by German troops during World War II, but was rebuilt again. It has primarily been used for logging, and is still used for this purpose, but in 2004 work began on rehabilitating it as a tourist attraction. A Swiss enthusiast who came to Romania in 1987 helped this greatly by starting an organisation for saving the railway: "Hilfe für die Wassertalbahn in Rumänien".

Several steam engines are used: 764-211 (Măriuța) was built in Berlin by Orenstein & Koppel in 1910; 763-193 (Krauss) was also built in Germany, in 1921; and there are five Romanian locomotives built at Reșița between 1953 and 1955. Diesel engines (built in 1960s-1970s) and other vehicles such as converted minivans also run on the lines. The latter are used by border police, rangers, and others for getting quickly up the mountains.

The tracks run from Vișeu de Sus, from a yard on Strada A. I. Cuza, 1.5 km (0.93 mi) north from the town centre. The main line is 43 km (27 mi) long, from Vișeu de Sus to Comanu, near the Ukrainian (former Polish) border, though the service may terminate before then at Faina. This trip usually takes between 3 and 4 hours each way.

There are two other branches: along the Novăț Valley (13 km (8.1 mi)) and towards Stevioara (3 km (1.9 mi)). The train can occasionally come off the rails, but at a speed of 10 km/h (6.2 mph) this poses no danger, and experienced passengers help to get the train back on the rails! The Vaser Valley is an exceptionally scenic location, the habitat of many bears and deer, along with many cattle and sheep. The line is run by a private company, Căile Ferate Forestiere (CFF). As well as regular services, trains can be charted by tourists; special services are also run, for instance on New Year's Eve.

The railway, and the Măriuța engine complete with rolling stock featured in episode 3 of "Wild East" ("From the Dniestr to the Danube" in the US version) of Michael Palin's New Europe.

== Other mocănițăs ==
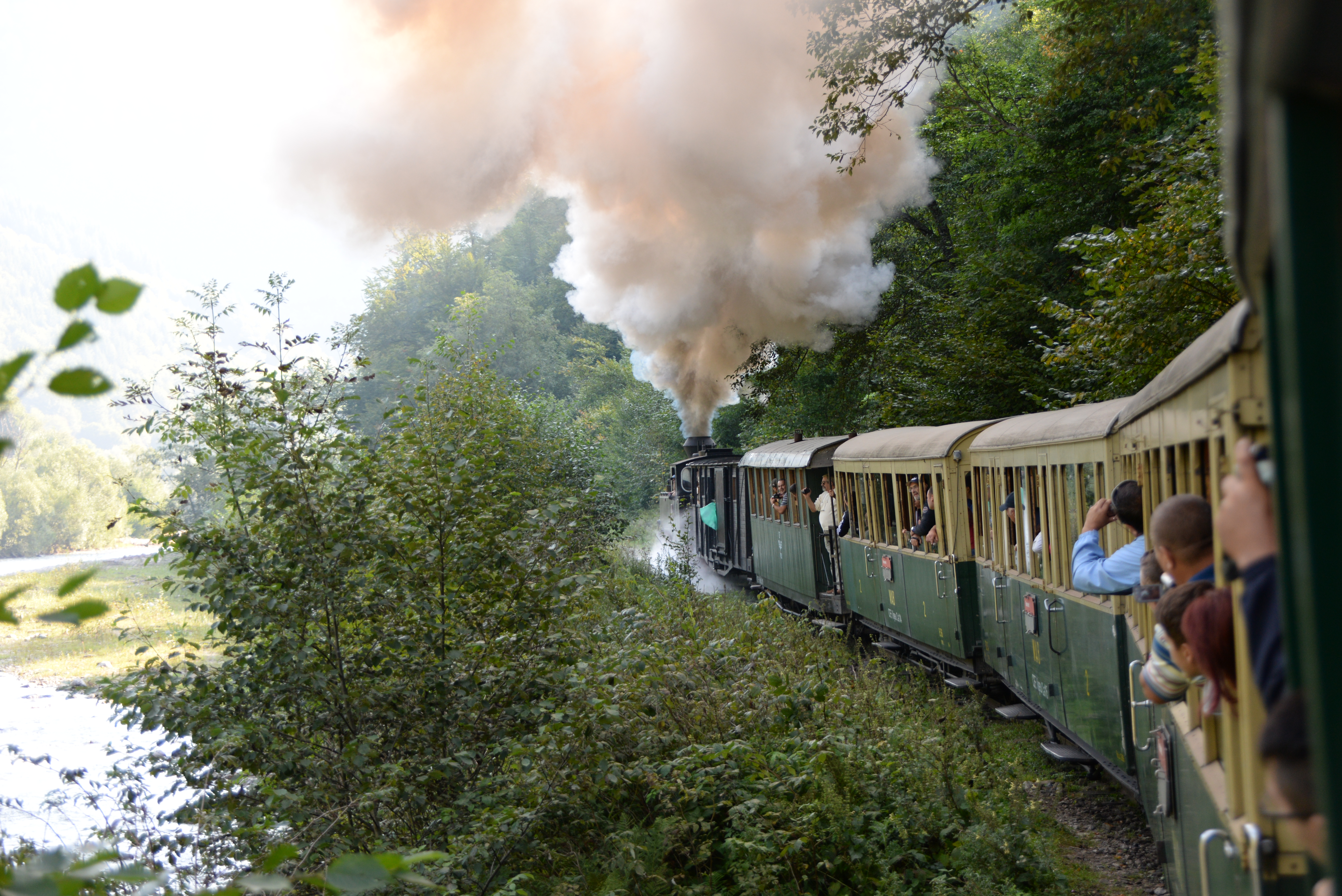
Narrow-gauge mixed train in Vișeu de Sus, September 2014

- Within the Apuseni Mountains, in the Arieș Valley region of Alba County. Trains are now operating on the Abrud to Câmpeni section of this line; it is planned that in the future they will run from Abrud to Turda. When operated as a non-tourist railway the journey time for the 93 km (58 mi) trip from Turda to Abrud took some six and a half hours. (CFR timetable 1988).
- The Agnita railway line is now designated as a historical monument, so it is saved from being scrapped and the plans to revive it may now go ahead.
- From Covasna to Comandău in Covasna County. Regular journeys last occurred here in 1999, but an association was formed in 2002 to save the train and a number of trips have since been made.
- From Crișcior to Brad in Hunedoara County. The line is currently classed as a historical heritage line and used for tourism on holidays.
- Other lines have been suggested as candidates for conversion into "mocăniță" tourist attractions, and some activity has been attempted on some of these though the situation may not be stable. These include the lines Târgu Mureș to Band, Dornești to Nisipitu, and Moldovița, though some of these lines may run on standard-gauge track.

== See also ==
- Rail transport in Romania
