= Boole (disambiguation) =

George Boole (1815–1864) was a British mathematician and philosopher, and originator of Boolean algebra.

Boole may also refer to:

- Boole (band), an electronic music group from the United States
- Boole (crater), a lunar crater
- Boole (tree), a giant sequoia tree in Sequoia National Forest

== People with the name ==
- Alicia Boole or Alicia Boole Stott (1860–1940), mathematician and daughter of Mary Everest and George Boole
- Mary Everest Boole (1832–1916), mathematician and wife of George Boole
- Sasha Boole (born 1988), Ukrainian singer and songwriter
- William H. Boole (1827–1896), pastor and prohibitionist in New York

== See also ==
- Bool (disambiguation)
- Boolean (disambiguation)
- Boule (disambiguation)
