= Dustards =

- English theatrical release poster
- Directed by: Stanislav Gurenko
- Produced by: Yana Altukhova; Alexander Kamenets; Dmitry Karpenko
- Starring: Igor Kaluh; Sergey Dozer; Alexander Popko; Volodymyr Cheremys
- Cinematography: Red Glass Production
- Music by: Alexander Bulich
- Distributed by: MMD
- Release date: November 3, 2016
- Running time: 56 minutes
- Country: Ukraine
- Languages: Russian, Ukrainian, English

Dustards is the first Ukrainian feature-length documentary film about motorcycle travel to Western Ukraine. The film premiered in November 2016.

== About the film ==
The story takes place in summer 2015, when four friends and a small film crew go on a journey to explore the Carpathian Mountains region.

«Dust, rain, lack of sleep and exhaustion were just a small part of everything we have experienced during our journey. However, the emotions which I have personally experienced and continue to feel while working on film have inspired and motivated me through all the process of creating this movie. I am sure that every person who lives in Ukraine and other countries around the world should know what an amazing country we live in»

— says Stanislaw Gurenko, the director of the documentary

The film was produced and launched by the company Red Glass Production known promotional shots for famous brands and collaborations with artists such as Pianoboy, O.Torvald, LOBODA and others. This is the first film project which engaged a team of Red Glass.

== Awards ==
- 2017 — Platinum award / International Independent Film Festival (Los Angeles)
- 2017 — Best documentary / London Independent Film Awards
- 2017 — Remi Award / Worldfest — Houston International Film Festival
- 2017 — Berlin International Filmmaker Festival of the World 2017 - Official selection
