= Boulle =

Boulle is a French surname. Notable people with the surname include:

- Jean Boulle, the father of André Charles Boulle, a cabinetmaker to the King of France
- Jean-Pierre Boullé (1753–1816), French politician
- André Charles Boulle (1642–1732), French cabinetmaker to the Sun King
- Étienne-Louis Boullée (1728–1799), French neoclassical architect
- Francis Boulle (born 1988) Comedian, entrepreneur and creator of Made in Chelsea
- Jean-Philippe Boulle (1678–1744), French cabinetmaker to the King of France and the oldest son of André-Charles Boulle
- Jean-Raymond Boulle (born 1950), mining entrepreneur, founder and principal shareholder of Titanium Resources Group
- Pierre Boulle (1912–1994), French novelist
- Rémy Boullé (born 1988), French paracanoeist

== See also ==
- Boulle work, marquetry process made famous by the French cabinetmaker André Charles Boulle
