= Sasha Boole =

Sasha Boole Олександр Буліч
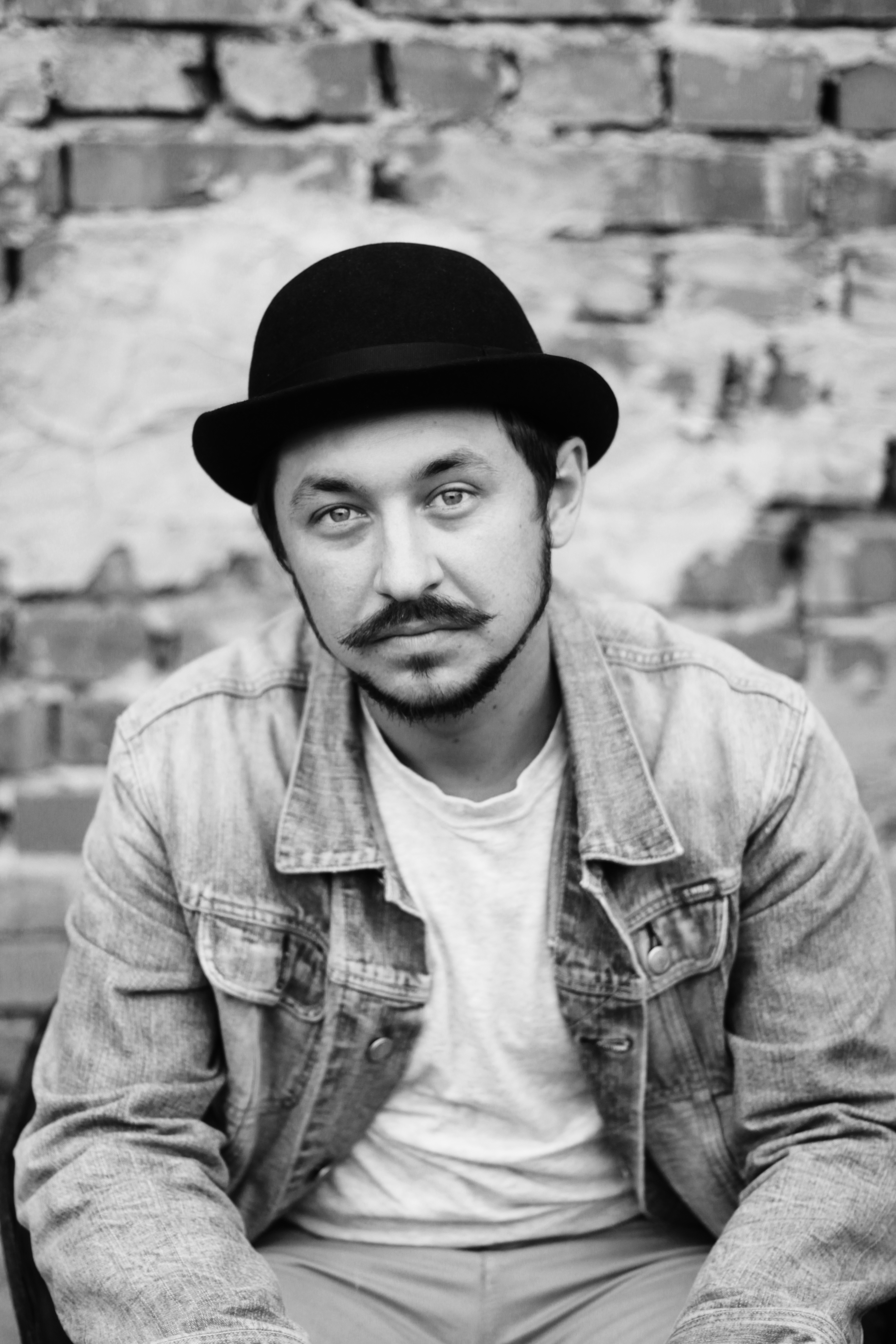
- Sasha Boole in 2014

Background information
- Born: Oleksandr Bulich; 21 March 1989 (age 37); Zhytomyr, Ukraine
- Origin: Ukraine
- Genres: Country; Indie folk
- Instruments: Guitar, banjo, harmonica
- Years active: 2012-present
- Labels: AbyShoMusic, Borowka Music, COMP Music/Universal

Oleksandr Bulich (born 21 March 1989), known by his stage name Sasha Boole, is a Ukrainian country and folk musician, singer and songwriter based in Chernivtsi, Ukraine.

== Early years ==
Bulich was born in Zhytomyr but raised in Chernivtsi. While studying in Chernivtsi University he learned to play guitar and started to write music and songs.

When thinking of his alias at one moment porn actress Sasha Grey came up to his mind and then English scientist George Boole showed up. So he decided to call himself Sasha Boole as a compiled name of both persons.

He searched his style from new stuff to old one. Learning The White Stripes he dug deeper and found out The Rolling Stones, then deeper again and he saw The Beatles; he was digging unless he found the music from Mississippi.

== Career ==
In 2013 he wrote several songs and recorded his first album Vol.1. It contained 11 tracks, most of them in the Ukrainian language. At the moment when the album was released Sasha Boole didn't know what sound he needed. Although his uncertainty Vol.1 was accepted really good, so it allowed him to make himself known at Ukrainian folk stage.

In support of this album he started touring Ukraine, Belarus and Moldova. At that time Euromaidan happened and under its influence, Bulich wrote a new album Survival Folk — much more adult than the previous one. While recording it he used just a guitar, harmonica and violin.

In 2016 he appeared as the soundtracks author for the movie Dustards.

In April 2017 he took part in his own marathon performing at 24 gigs per 24 hours.

On May 23, 2017, his third album Golden Tooth was released.

In October 2021, Boole released a post-apocalyptic novel titled Ivy. Boole cites American author Cormac McCarthy as an influence.

== Discography ==
=== Albums ===
- Vol. 1 — 2013
- Survival Folk — 2014
- Golden Tooth — 2017
- Too Old To Sell My Soul — 2020

=== Singles ===
- Golden Tooth — 2017

== Videos ==
- Would You Give Me A Hand (directed by Stas Puzdriak) — 2013
- Дорога (The Road, directed by Stat Hurenko) — 2014
