= Jean-Pierre Boullé =

French politician (1753–1816)

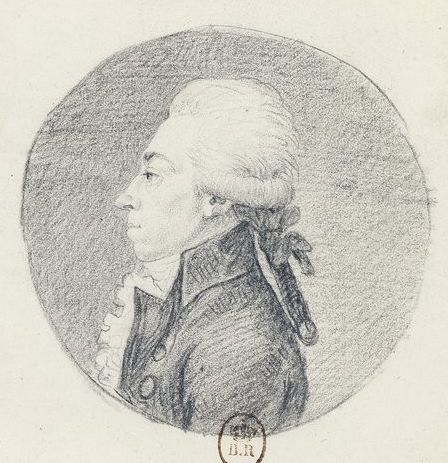
An undated sketch of Jean-Pierre Boullé

Jean-Pierre Boullé (July 29, 1753 – June 13, 1816) was a French politician who sat in the Estates General of 1789 and was a member of the Council of Five Hundred under the Constitution of the Year III. During the Napoleonic era, he was the prefect of Côtes-du-Nord.
