= Boully =

Boully or de Boully is a surname. Notable people with the surname include:

- Harry Boully (1879–1970), Australian rules footballer
- Jenny Boully (born 1976), American author
- Monny de Boully (1904–1968), Franco-Serbian writer and poet
