= Novăț =

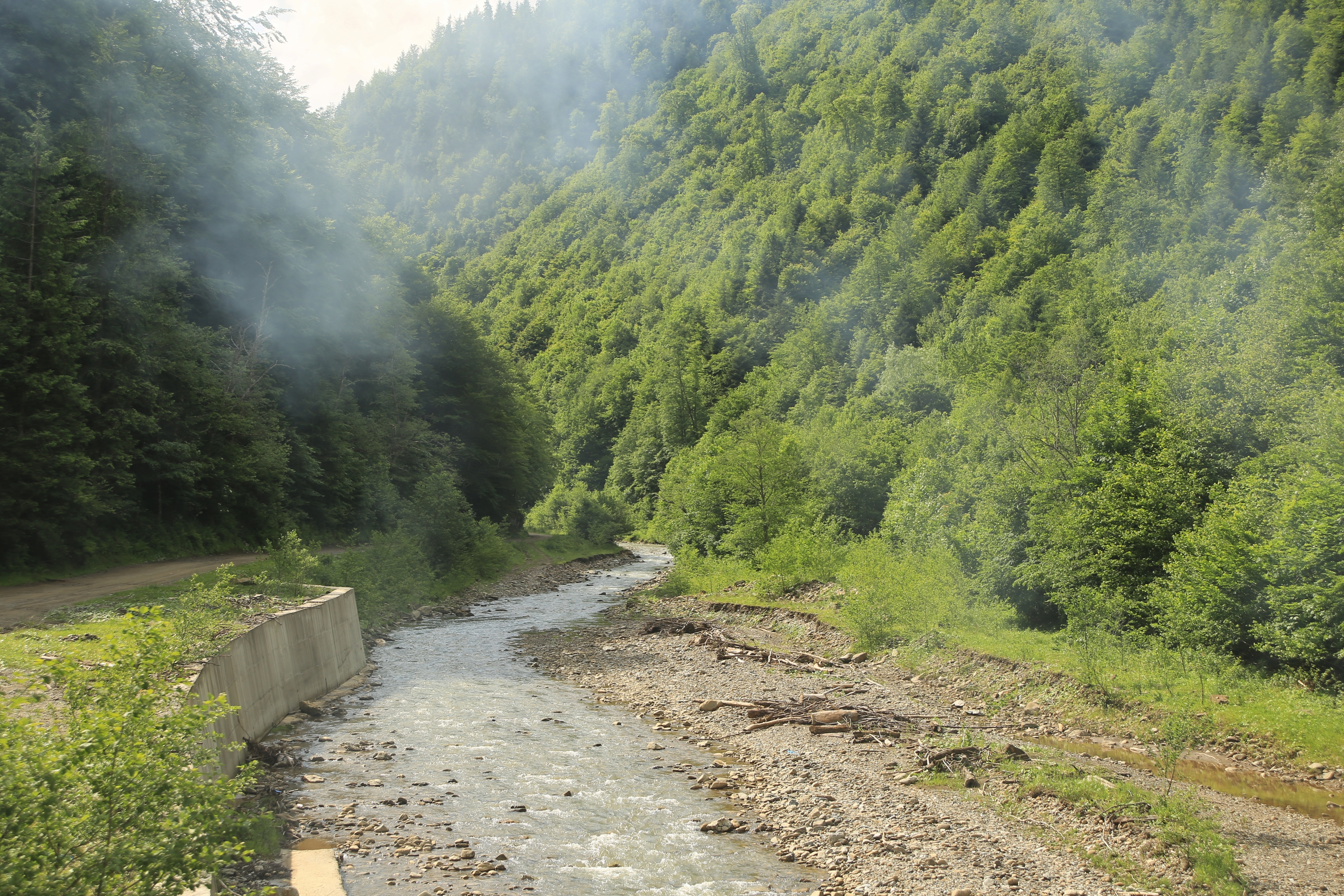

- Location within Romania

Location
- Country: Romania
- Counties: Maramureș County

Physical characteristics
- Mouth: Vaser
  - coordinates: 47°44′26″N 24°32′17″E
- Length: 16 km (9.9 mi)
- Basin size: 88 km^{2} (34 sq mi)

Basin features
- Progression: Vaser→ Vișeu→ Tisza→ Danube→ Black Sea
- Tributaries
  - left: Izvorul Cailor, Valea Boului

The Novăț is a left tributary of the Vaser in Maramureș County, Romania. Its length is 16 km (9.9 mi), and its basin size is 88 km^{2} (34 sq mi). There is an abandoned narrow-gauge railway (Mocăniță) in the Novăț valley, a branch line of the Vaser valley railway.
