= Boule bretonne =

Boule bretonne is a sport popular in Brittany, France, similar to boule lyonnaise and to a lesser extent, pétanque. The method of playing varies widely among those that play it.

== Rules ==
Boule bretonne is very similar to bocce in that it involves one team tossing out a jack, known as the 'petit', and following it with tossing of boules, points being scored for having balls ending up closest to the jack. Games are played with varying teams of various sizes, from one to four players per team.

Balls used to play are 92 to 110 mm diameter and weigh 600 grams to 1 kg. In the past, wooden balls were common, but since the 1960s, resin balls have come into favor.

The game can be played on grass, gravel, or in a courtyard. During the 20th century, courts consisting clay walkways clay two to three feet wide by fifteen to twenty feet long surrounded by a wooden border were installed in many cafes. Boules can be bounced off the side borders but are out of play if they touch the backboard.
