= Henry Bool =

American anarchist (1846–1922)

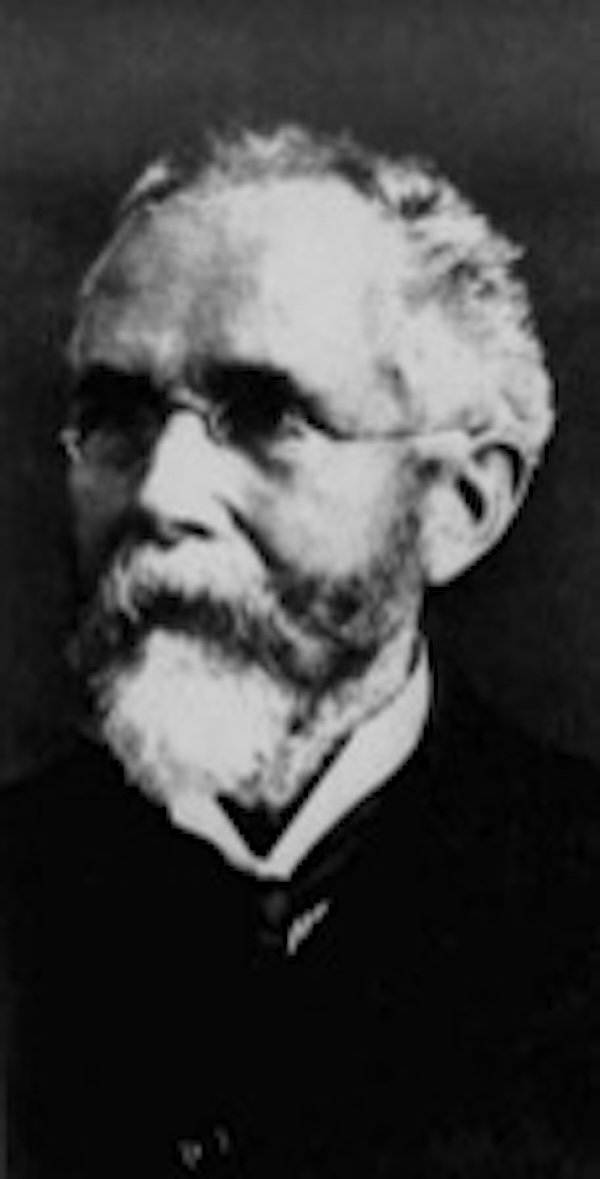
- Born: 1846; Montacute, Somerset, England
- Died: March 27, 1922 (aged 75–76); Montacute, Somerset, England
- Occupations: Anarchist and Businessman
- Years active: 1872-1922
- Spouse: Elizabeth Reed (m. 1879) (died 1910)

Henry Bool (1846 – March 27, 1922) was an English-American individualist anarchist.

Bool was born in England and in mid 1872 emigrated to Ithaca, NY. In Ithaca, he worked initially as a carpenter, helping to build the house of Ezra Cornell. But he soon became wealthy by selling magazine subscriptions to The Golden Age and The Independent on the side. In 1873 Bool opened a store that sold furniture, frames, and general goods. In 1879, he married Ithaca native Elizabeth Reed, 18 years his senior.

Bool’s business activities in Ithaca expanded significantly in the late nineteenth century. His operations, based in the Forest Home area, included furniture manufacturing, picture framing, and the production of scientific supplies, including entomological slides and custom sewing machine parts for the Singer Corporation.

His commercial activities also extended into floriculture. The Bool Floral Company was established in 1894 in cooperation with his nephew Arthur. Their greenhouses, located both to Ithaca's northeast (Booltown) and southwest (Floral Ave.), were later noted as a prominent feature of Ithaca’s landscape into the mid-twentieth century.

In 1890, Bool reorganized his home goods business into a cooperative enterprise employing approximately thirty workers; contemporary accounts describe him as paying comparatively high wages and implementing a 50-percent profit-sharing system with employees.

Around this time he began withdrawing from active commercial life, selling much of his business property and devoting himself increasingly to reading and reform activity. As one account states, "And then one day he woke up to a realization of the usefulness and folly of spending any more of his time at the money-making game." He devoted himself to reading, writing, and the wide circulation of anarchist and reform literature, reportedly distributing tens of thousands of pamphlets and maintaining a private lending library.

In 1899, Bool reflected on the contradictions of his own economic position, writing:

I have been search assiduously from my 'teens up for some halfway house from complete slavery to complete freedom, but have failed to find any logical stopping place yet. If we had a perfectly open market I should never have considered it my duty to disburse to my people, but being fully alive to that fact that I had benefitted by the unjust conditions and feeling the complete impossibility for me to have made much material progress without others to help me, I was goaded on to a measurable sop towards what they must perforce command when the dice of life come not loaded.

After the 1901 assassination of William McKinley by self-declared anarchist Leon Czolgosz, Bool came under scrutiny for his beliefs, with The Ithaca Journal recommending a boycott of his businesses. In response, he published a defense of anarchism that condemned Czolgosz, titled Henry Bool’s Apology for His Jeffersonian Anarchism. The journal Liberty noted that Bool, "well-nigh single-handed, almost alone even among Anarchists, made heroic efforts to stem the tide of [anti-Anarchist] insanity that swept the country."

Bool's anarchism was utopian and pacifist; in Ithaca he was called "our local Thoreau." He wrote, “I am a believer in the doctrines of the individualistic school of Anarchists, to which Garrison, Emerson, Proudhon, Thoreau, Spooner, Andrews, Warren and Tucker belong.” He maintained a close relationship with editor Benjamin Tucker, corresponding with him in 1899 regarding the publication of Oscar Wilde’s The Ballad of Reading Gaol and contributing $500 to Tucker’s efforts. Bool also funded the republication of works by Stephen Pearl Andrews. He opposed both propaganda by the deed and communist anarchism.

In his later years, Bool spent winters in Florida, first establishing a residence in Coconut Grove around 1904 and maintaining connections there, including property purchases associated with Joseph Labadie. Following the death of his wife in 1910, he returned to England and settled in Montacute, Somerset, though he continued to hold property interests. Reports suggest that the couple had spent increasing periods apart in the years preceding her death.

Bool remained an active public voice into the twentieth century, writing in defense of anarchism, corresponding with public figures including Theodore Roosevelt, and advocating for causes such as free speech and the defense of controversial reformers including Ida Craddock and Moses Harman. During World War I, his opposition to U.S. participation reportedly led to surveillance and censorship.

Bool died at his birthplace of Montacute on March 27, 1922, following a ten-day illness attributed to bronchial pneumonia; he was cremated.

His papers are held in the Labadie Collection at the University of Michigan.
