= Jack Boul =

American painter (1927–2024)

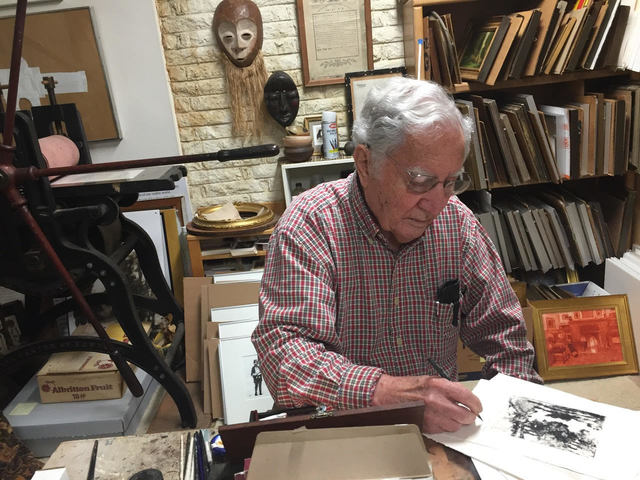
- Boul in 2020
- Born: February 8, 1927; New York City, New York, U.S.
- Died: November 8, 2024 (aged 97); Washington, D.C., U.S.
- Spouse: Vivian Boul m. 1948; died 2020
- Website: http://jackboul.com

Jack Boul (February 8, 1927 – November 8, 2024) was an American artist and teacher based in Washington, D.C., whose oil paintings, monotypes and sculpture are included in museums including the National Gallery of Art and the Phillips Collection.

His work has also been exhibited at the Corcoran Gallery of Art, the Baltimore Museum of Art, the Mint Museum, and Stanford University's Art Gallery in Washington. He taught for many years at American University and was one of the founding members of the non-profit Washington Studio School.

== Background ==
Boul was born in Brooklyn, New York, on February 8, 1927 to Russian and Romanian parents and raised in the South Bronx. He attended the American Artists School in New York before serving in the United States Army. In 1945–46 he served as a sergeant in an Engineer's battalion as part of the U.S. Occupational Forces in and around Pisa, Italy. After the war he moved to Seattle, Washington, where he studied at the Cornish School of Art, graduating in 1951. Later that year, he moved to Washington, D.C. to continue his studies at American University.

Boul died at his home in Washington D.C., on November 8, 2024, at the age of 97.

== Exhibitions ==
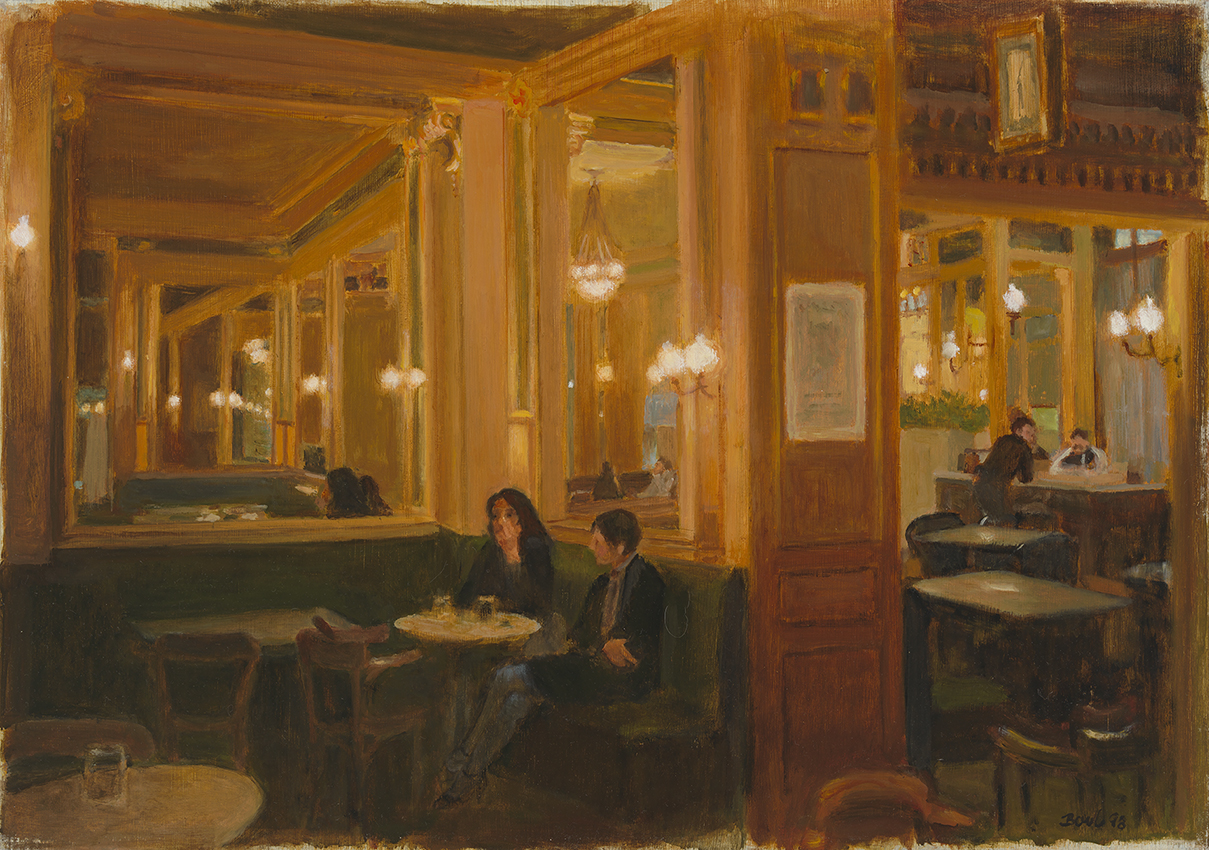
Reflections, Cafe Interior, 1998 (Private Collection)

Boul exhibited in the Annual Area Exhibition at the Corcoran Gallery of Art in 1951 and again in 1954, 1956, and 1958. In 1957, he received his first solo exhibition at the Franz Bader Gallery attracting positive reviews that cited him as a promising young artist. In 1960, he had a one man show at the Watkins Gallery of Art at American University. Boul had his first museum exhibition in 1974 at the Baltimore Museum of Art. In 1986, he was part of a two-person exhibition at the Mint Museum in Charlotte North Carolina with his friend, Pete DeAnna. That exhibition was later shown at the University of Maryland.

In 2000, the Corcoran Gallery of Art featured a large retrospective of Boul's work in an exhibition "Intimate Impressions: Monotypes and Paintings by Jack Boul" that was curated by Dr. Eric Denker.

That Corcoran show garnered positive reviews including one by Paul Richard, the longtime art critic at The Washington Post. In his review of that show, Richard wrote of Boul: "His subjects are as unthreatening as a stroll in the country or a visit to the Phillips. He sees an empty wheelbarrow bright in the back yard, glowing in the sunshine of a summer afternoon, and in a few strokes captures the essence of that vision. His monotype technique evokes Edgar Degas’. The modernists of Paris liked to walk through neighborhoods and record the quotidian. Boul sees a bald man in a barbershop getting a haircut, and, through a flurry of his dispersed markings, so do we. He sees a couple dining in Baltimore at Haussner’s, or his wife reading the newspaper in the living room, or cows. Nice bucolic cows. The man makes pleasant pictures. And they are pictures with an unexpected kick. Boul’s retrospective at the Corcoran delivers to the brain bracing little jolts of a strong emotion sensed seldom in contemporary art."

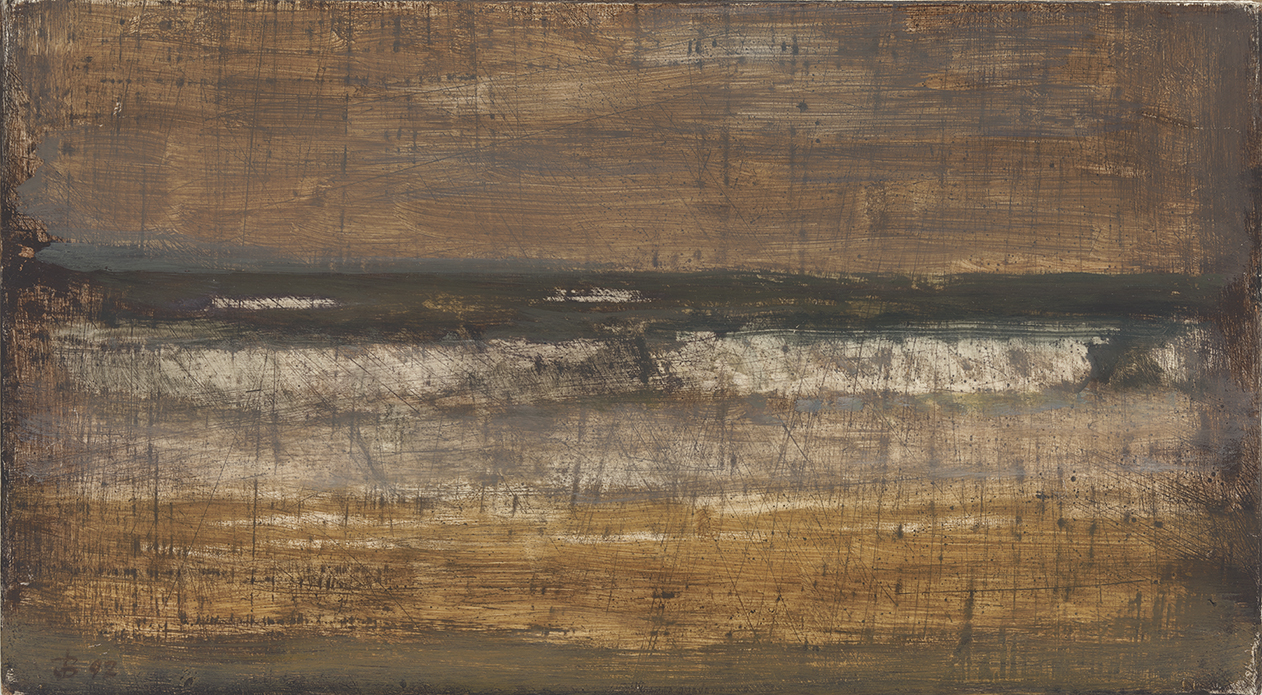
Waves, 1992 (the Phillips Collection)

In 2017, Stanford University's Art Gallery in Washington featured a large retrospective of Boul's work in an exhibition titled "Jack Boul at 90". Stanford's director there, Adrienne Jamieson, wrote in the exhibition's catalogue: "Throughout his over six decades of making art in Washington and its environs, Jack Boul has captured the quotidian: the gently illuminated interior of a cafe or his own studio; the geometric shapes that compromise a cityscape; a pastoral scene anchored by beautifully painted cows. His singular talent shines through each piece, as gentle gradations of color emerge from his deft handling of brush and paint."

In June 2022, the works of Jack Boul were exhibited in Paris at the Salle Paul Rosenberg, the legendary gallery of the art dealer of Picasso. In 2025, Jack Boul had exhibitions at both the Blowing Rock Art and History Museum in North Carolina and the National Sporting Library Museum in Middleburg, Va.

In 2026, a suite of classical music based on eight of Jack Boul's paintings was performed at the Kreeger Museum in Washington. That performance was broadcast on WETA-FM.

== Teaching ==
Boul has taught art at many varied venues from the Scuola Internazionale di Grafica in Venice, Italy, to Montgomery College in Takoma Park, Maryland, and the Chestnut Lodge psychiatric institution in Rockville, Maryland. In 1969, he was appointed to the art faculty at American University and during his 15-year tenure there showed regularly at the school's Watkins Gallery. In 1984, he was one of the founding faculty members at the Washington Studio School where he taught painting, drawing and monotype for more than a decade. He retired from the Studio School in 1994 to devote his time to printmaking and painting.

== Collections ==
Jack Boul’s works are included in many private and public collections in America. Boul has paintings, monotypes and sculpture in museums that include the National Gallery of Art, The San Francisco Art Museum Legion of Honor, the Phillips Collection of Washington DC, the Corcoran Legacy Collection at American University, the Los Angeles Museum of the Holocaust, and the Stanford University collection in Washington DC. In addition, Boul's works have been added to the Library of Congress Prints and Photographs division and the Smithsonian Institution's National Museum of American History.

In 2021, Maryland First Lady Yumi Hogan selected two of Jack Boul's works to add to the Maryland State Art Collection. One of the paintings, "Maryland Landscape" was placed in the governor's mansion's Drawing Room on the first floor.

== Holocaust series of monotypes ==
While serving in the US Army as a young soldier in Italy at the end of World War II, Boul has said he was profoundly affected by official government photos of the atrocities at Nazi concentration camps. Years later, he created a series of 17 monoprints depicting stark images of Holocaust victims. He has said it was important to memorialize this dark moment in history. Boul's Holocaust series was first exhibited at the Corcoran Gallery of Art in 2000. It was later donated to Los Angeles Museum of the Holocaust in 2008. “Jack Boul’s series is more than simply about the Holocaust as a pictorial record,” wrote Dr. Eric Denker, Senior Lecturer at the National Gallery of Art in Washington. “It transcends that, in the way that great art always transcends the immediacy of its subject…As with Kahlo, as with Goya, it’s an anti-war tract of great power."

== Selected oil paintings ==
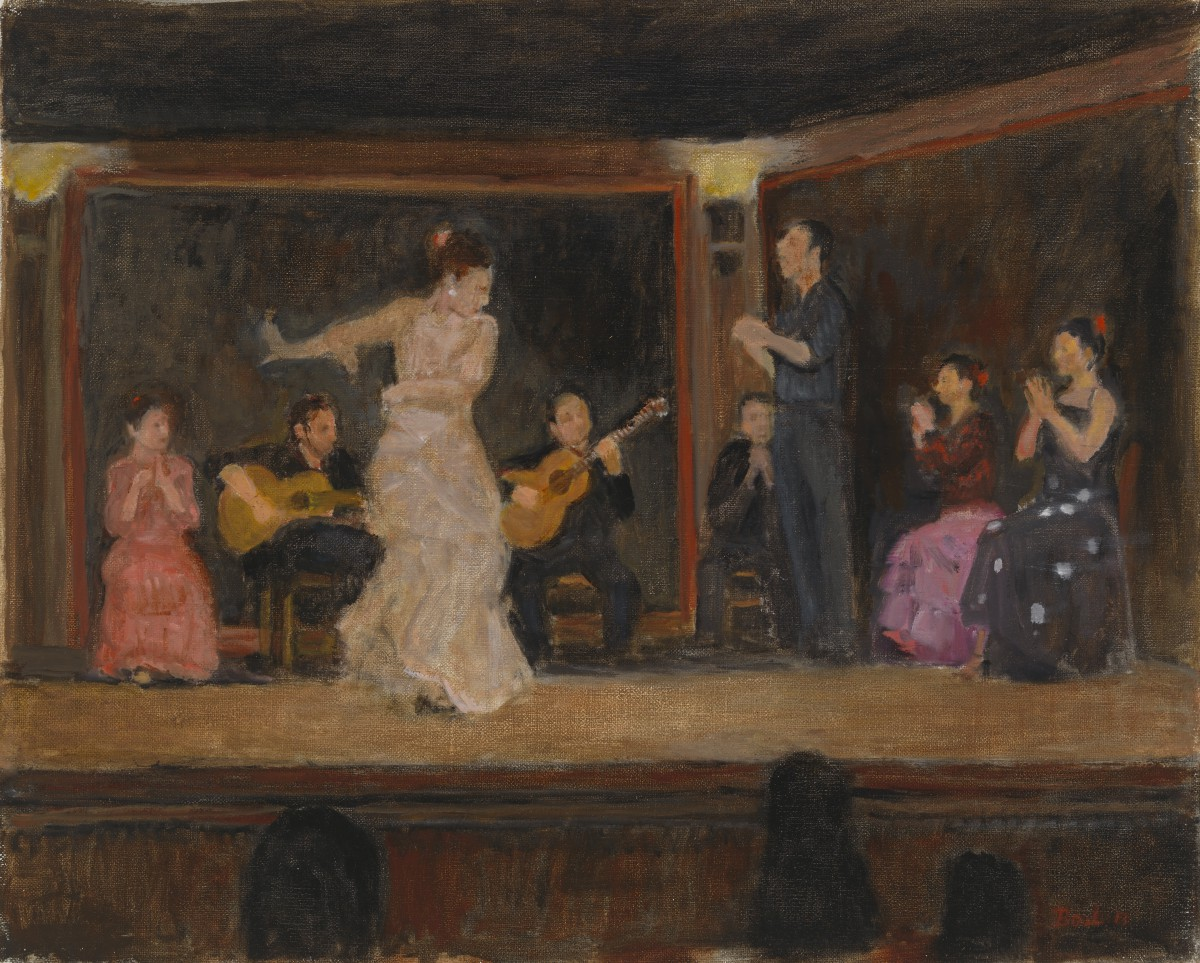
Flamenco Dancers, 2013 (Personal Collection)

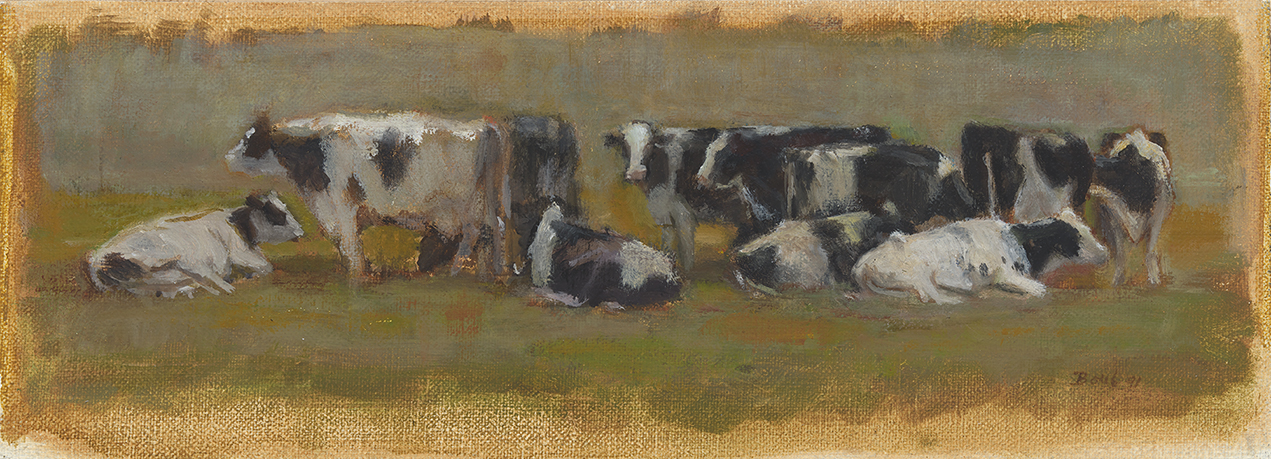
Ten Cows, 1991 (Kyropoulos/Tenney Collection)

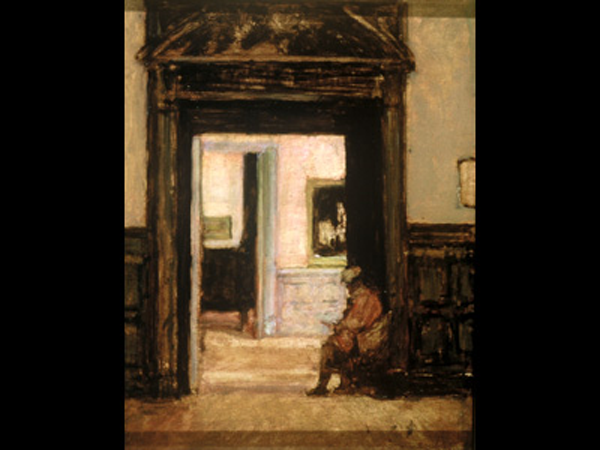
Gallery Guard, 2017 (the Phillips Collection)

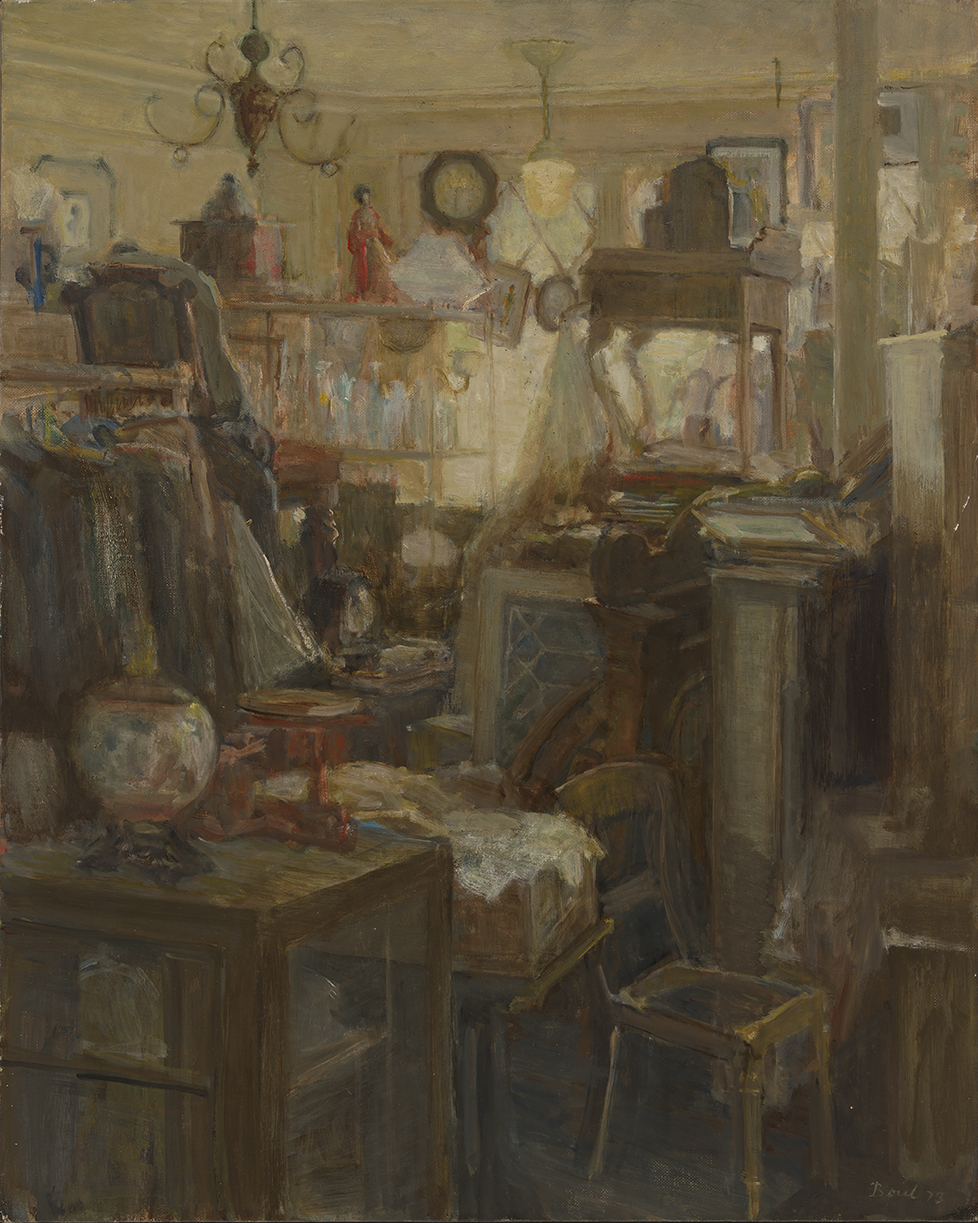
Antiques on the Hill, 1973 (Private Collection)

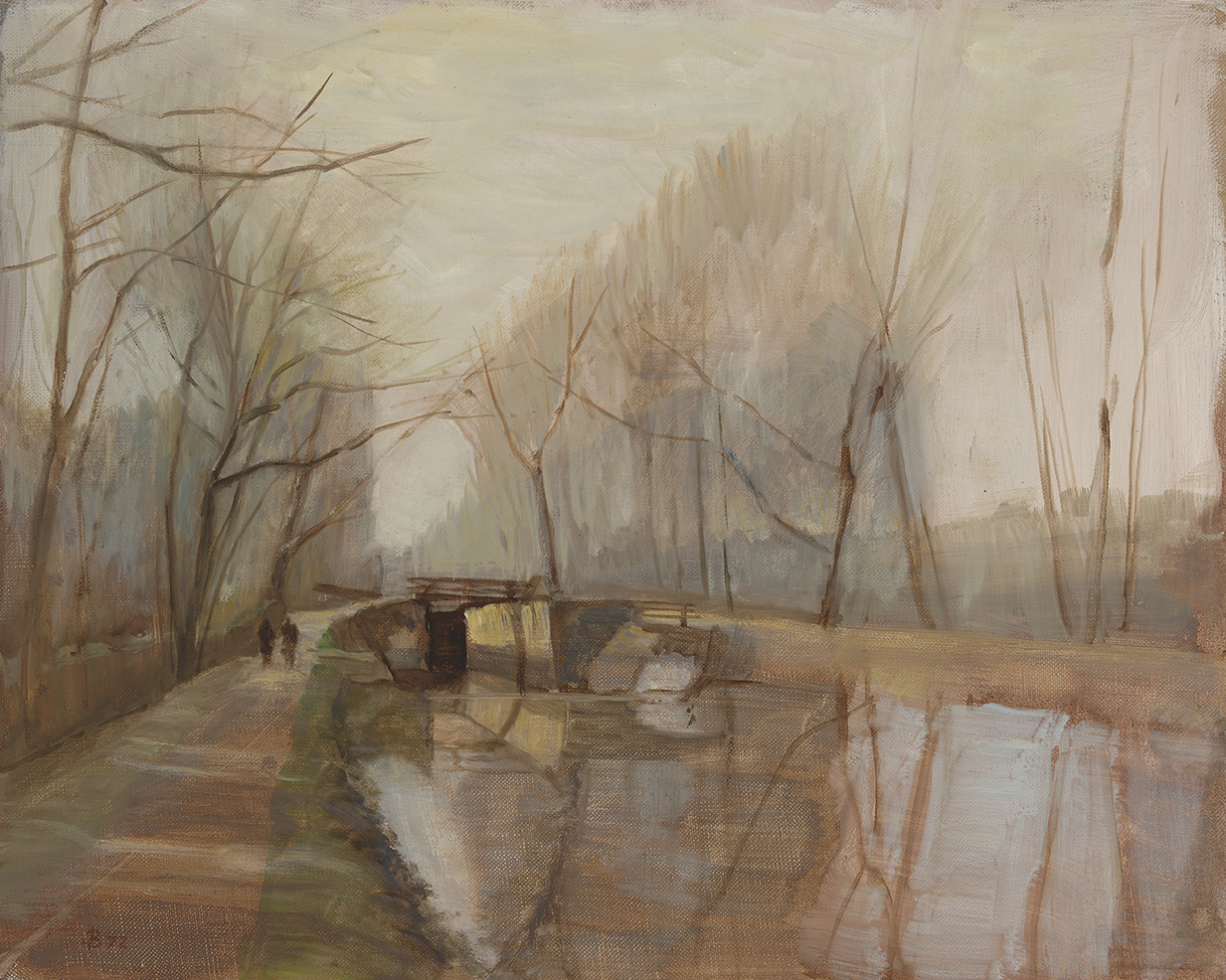
C&O Canal, 1972 (Personal Collection)

== Selected monotypes ==
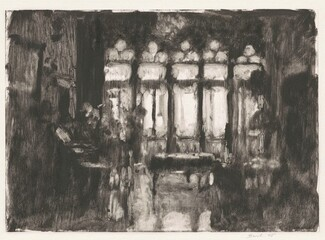
Venetian Interior, 1995 (National Gallery of Art)

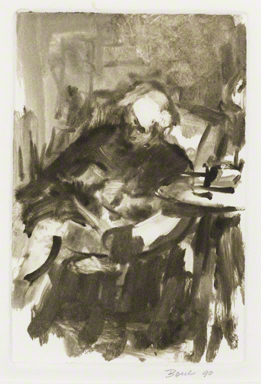
Woman with a Book, 1990 (the Phillips Collection)

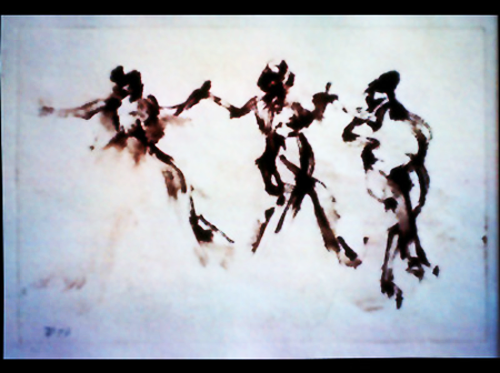
Three Dancers, 1976 (Personal Collection)

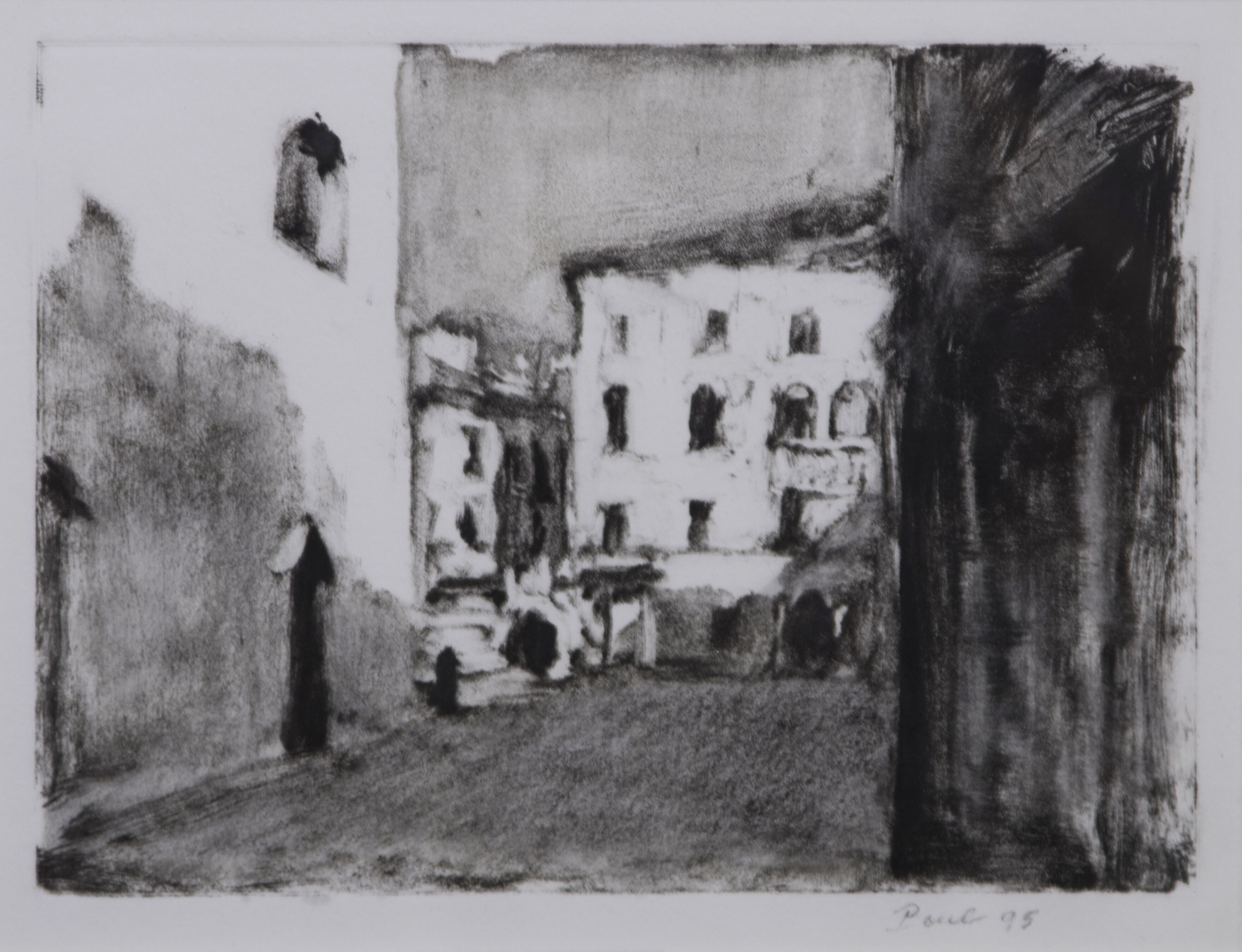
Street Scene, 1995 (Private Collection)

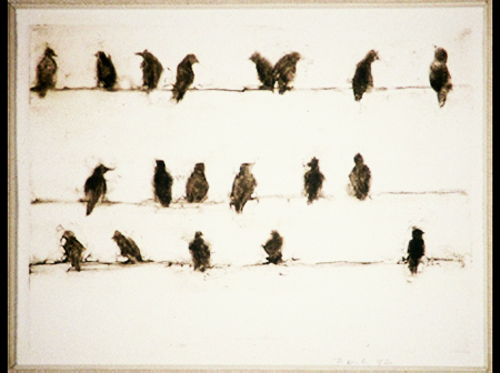
Nineteen Birds, 1992 (Personal Collection)
