= Valea Boului =

Valea Boului may refer to the following rivers in Romania:

- Valea Boului, a tributary of the Amaradia in Gorj County
- Valea Boului, a tributary of the Arieșul Mic in Alba County
- Valea Boului (Buzău), a tributary of the Buzău in Buzău and Brăila Counties
- Valea Boului, a tributary of the Galbena in Hunedoara County
- Valea Boului, a tributary of the Homorod in Brașov County
- Valea Boului, a tributary of the Jiul de Vest in Hunedoara and Gorj Counties
- Valea Boului, a tributary of the Novăț in Maramureș County
- Valea Boului, a tributary of the Peștiș in Hunedoara County
- Valea Boului, a tributary of the Podriga in Botoșani County
- Valea Boului, a tributary of the Șușița in Gorj County
- Valea Boului, a tributary of the Vasilat in Vâlcea County

and to:

- Valea Boului, the former name of Păltiniș, Caraș-Severin
- Valea Boului, the former name of Paltinu, a village in the commune of Vatra Moldoviței, Suceava county, Romania
