= Vaser =

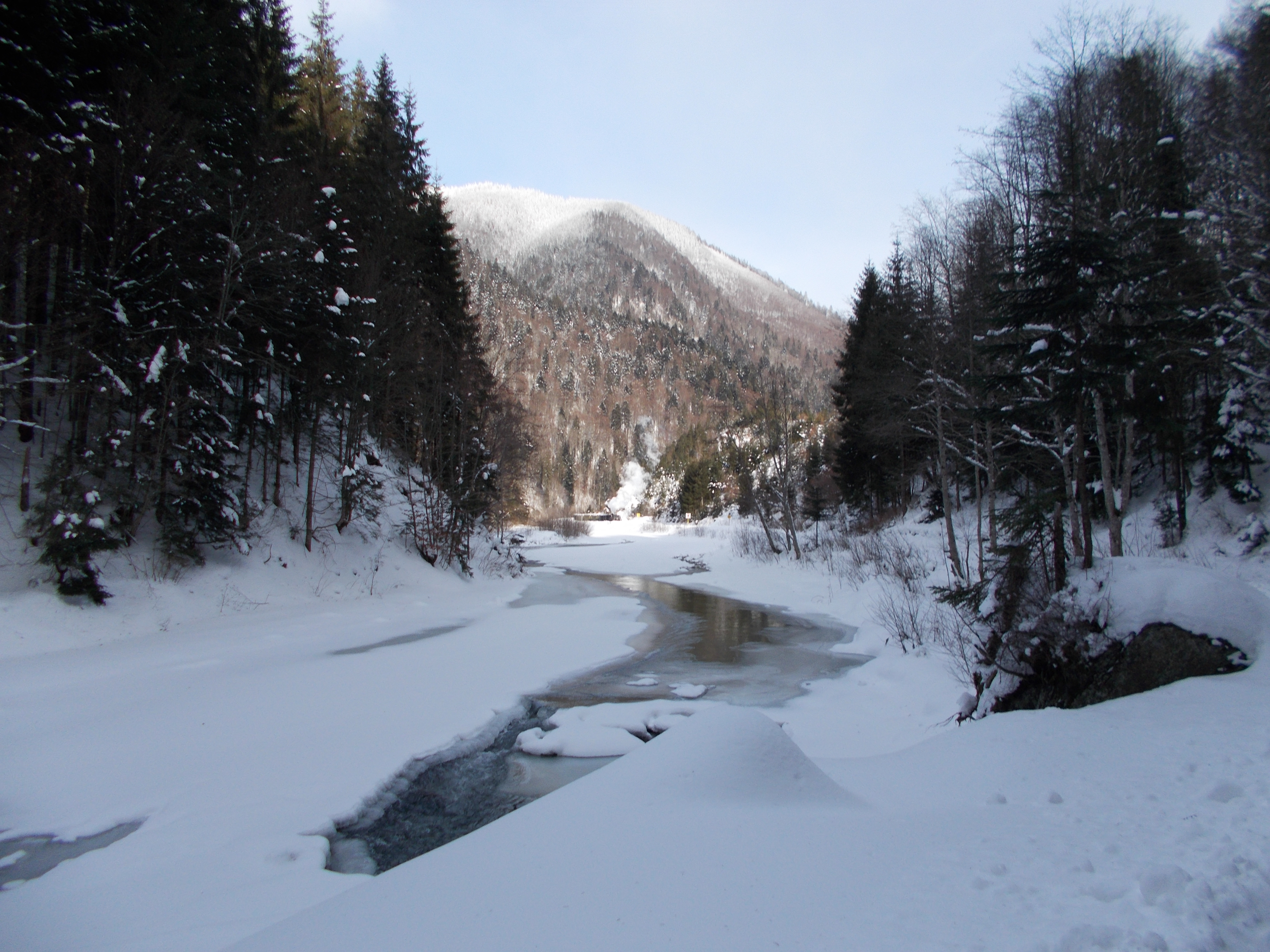

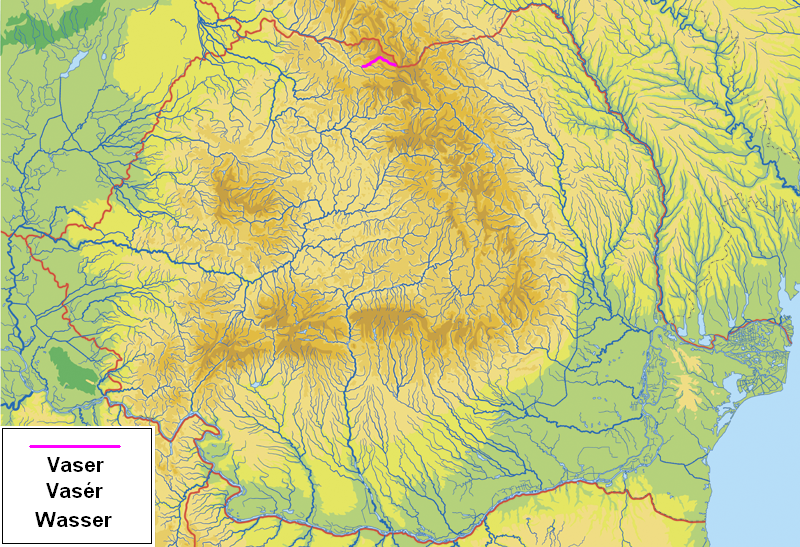

- Location within Romania

Location
- Country: Romania
- Counties: Maramureș County

Physical characteristics
- Mouth: Vișeu
  - location: Vișeu de Sus
  - coordinates: 47.7113°N 24.4203°E
- Length: 48 km (30 mi)
- Basin size: 410 km^{2} (160 sq mi)

Basin features
- Progression: Vișeu→ Tisza→ Danube→ Black Sea

The Vaser (Hungarian: Vasér) is a right tributary of the river Vișeu in Romania. Its length is 48 km (30 mi) and its basin size is 410 km^{2} (160 sq mi). It flows into the Vișeu in Vișeu de Sus.

== Tributaries ==
The following rivers are tributaries to the river Vaser:

- Left: Măcârlău, Novicior, Novăț
- Right: Puru, Lostun, Făina, Botiza, Valea Peștilor
