= Bouleț =

- Location within Romania

Location
- Country: Romania
- Counties: Neamț County

Physical characteristics
- Source: Confluence of headwaters Boulețul Mare and Boulețul Mic
- Mouth: Cracăul Alb
  - coordinates: 47.1131°N 26.1717°E
- Length: 8 km (5.0 mi)
- Basin size: 30 km^{2} (12 sq mi)

Basin features
- Progression: Cracăul Alb→ Cracău→ Bistrița→ Siret→ Danube→ Black Sea
- Tributaries
  - left: Boulețul Mare, Sas
  - right: Boulețul Mic

The Bouleț is a right tributary of the river Cracăul Alb in Romania. It starts at the confluence of headwaters Boulețul Mare and Boulețul Mic. It flows into the Cracăul Alb in Mitocu Bălan. Its length is 8 km (5.0 mi) and its basin size is 30 km^{2} (12 sq mi).

== Maps ==
- Harta turistică, Parcul Vânători-Neamț
