= Cracăul Alb =

- Location within Romania

Location
- Country: Romania
- Counties: Neamț County

Physical characteristics
- Mouth: Cracău
  - coordinates: 47.1004°N 26.2511°E
- Length: 15 km (9.3 mi)
- Basin size: 77 km^{2} (30 sq mi)

Basin features
- Progression: Cracău→ Bistrița→ Siret→ Danube→ Black Sea

The Cracăul Alb is a river in the Vânători-Neamț Natural Park in Neamț County, Romania. At its confluence with the Cracăul Negru in Magazia, the river Cracău is formed. Its length is 15 km (9.3 mi) and its basin size is 77 km^{2} (30 sq mi).

== Tributaries ==
The following rivers are tributaries to the river Cracăul Alb (from source to mouth):

- Left: Bilbor, Pietrosu, Sofica, Pârâul Platonești, Bolătău, Izvorul Alb, Pârâul Adânc
- Right: Alunul, Pârâul Popii, Frasinu, Bouleț
