= Magazia =

Magazia may refer to several places:

- Magazia, a village in Răchitoasa Commune, Bacău County, Romania
- Magazia, a village in Crăcăoani Commune, Neamţ County, Romania
- Magazia, Paxoi, a village in the island Paxoi, Greece
