= Porcești =

Porcești is the former name of three places in Romania:

- Moldoveni, Neamț
- Turnu Roșu, Sibiu County
- Vălenii de Mureș, a village in Brâncovenești, Mureș
