= Vânători-Neamț Natural Park =

Protected area in Romania

- Parcul Natural Vânători Neamț
- IUCN category V (protected landscape/seascape)
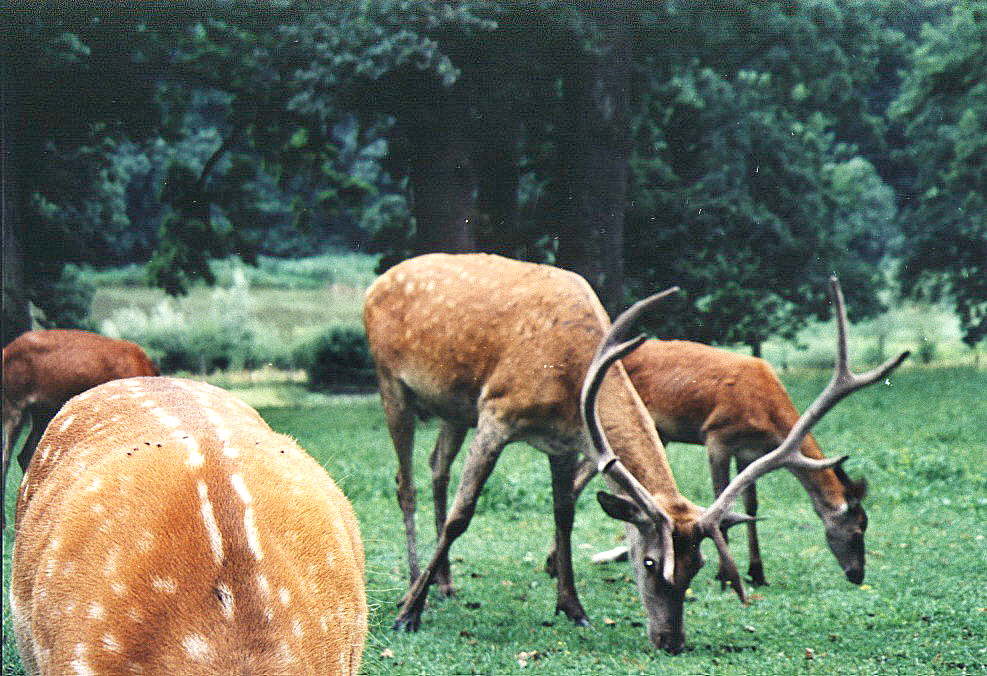
- Vânători Park

- Location within Romania
- Location: Neamț County, Romania
- Nearest city: Târgu Neamț
- Coordinates: 47.155°N 26.202°E
- Area: 306.31 km^{2} (118.27 sq mi)
- Established: 2003
- Website: www.vanatoripark.ro

The Vânători-Neamț Natural Park (Romanian: Parcul Natural Vânători-Neamț) is situated in north-east Romania, in Neamț County, on the border with Suceava County. It lies on the administrative territories of the communes Agapia, Bălțătești, Brusturi, Crăcăoani, Vânători-Neamț, Răucești, Boroaia (Suceava), and the town of Târgu Neamț.

The park is situated in the Eastern Carpathian Foothills, at the foot of the Stânișoara Mountains, and is crossed by the rivers Cracău and Ozana.

Vânători Park is one of the few places where the European bison (Bison bonasus) can be seen. There are 17 such zimbrii in a protected 180 ha (440 acres) area in Vânători-Neamț commune. The aurochs head ("cap de bour" in Romanian) is the heraldic symbol of the historical province of Moldavia, although the aurochs (now extinct) was a separate species from the European bison.

== Gallery ==
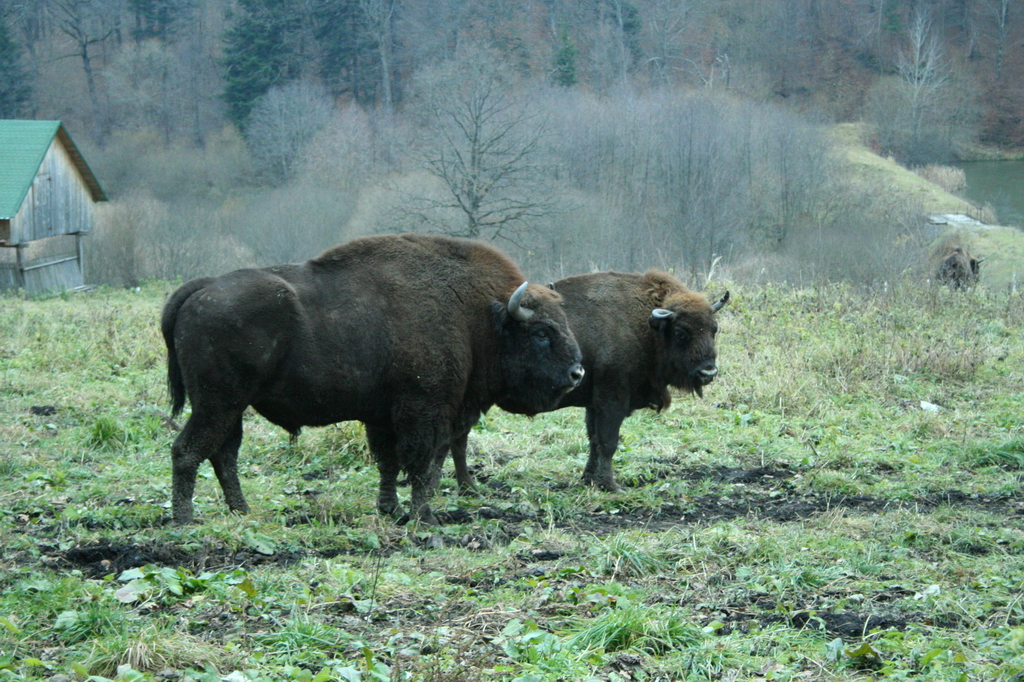
European bison

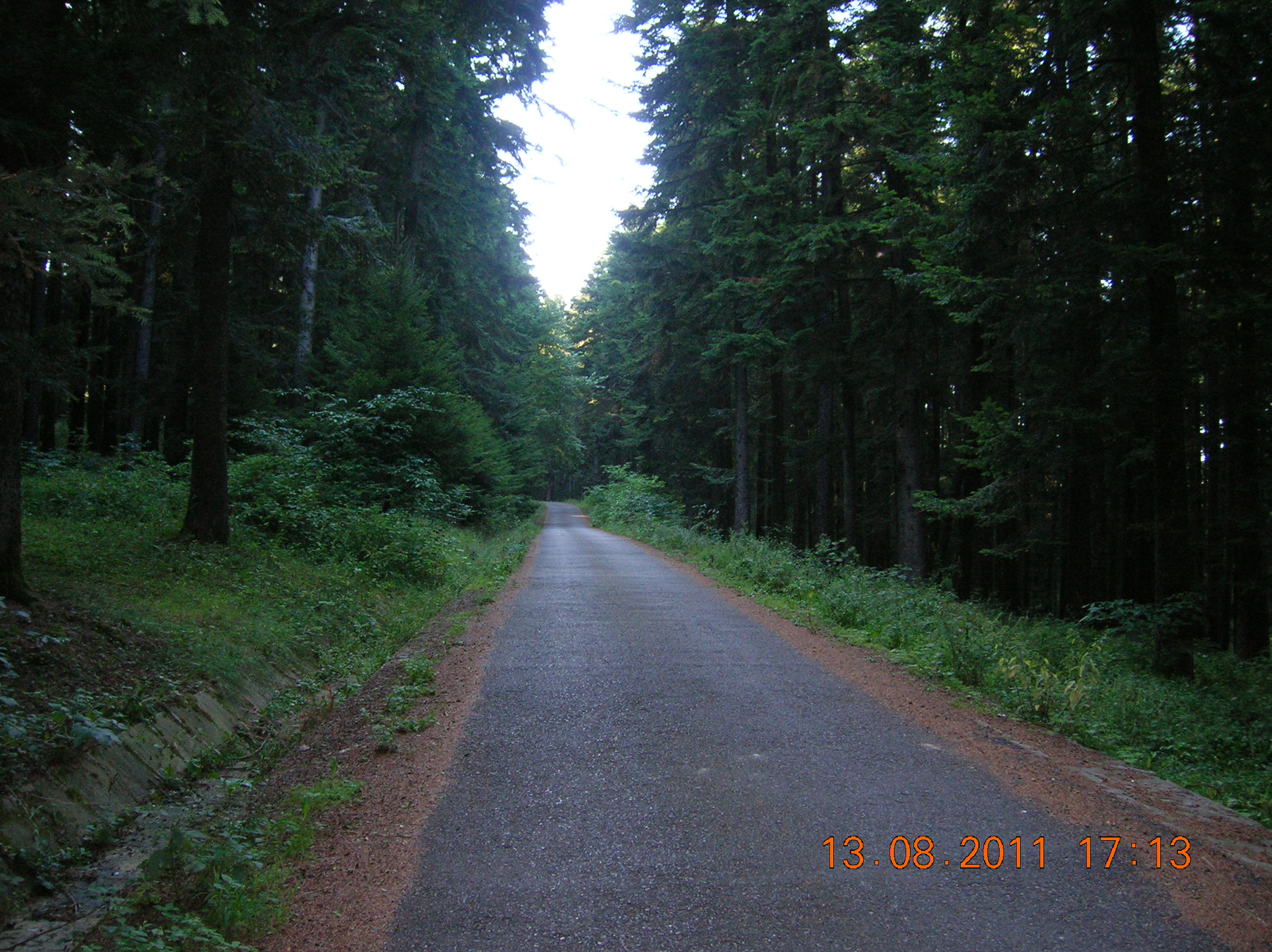

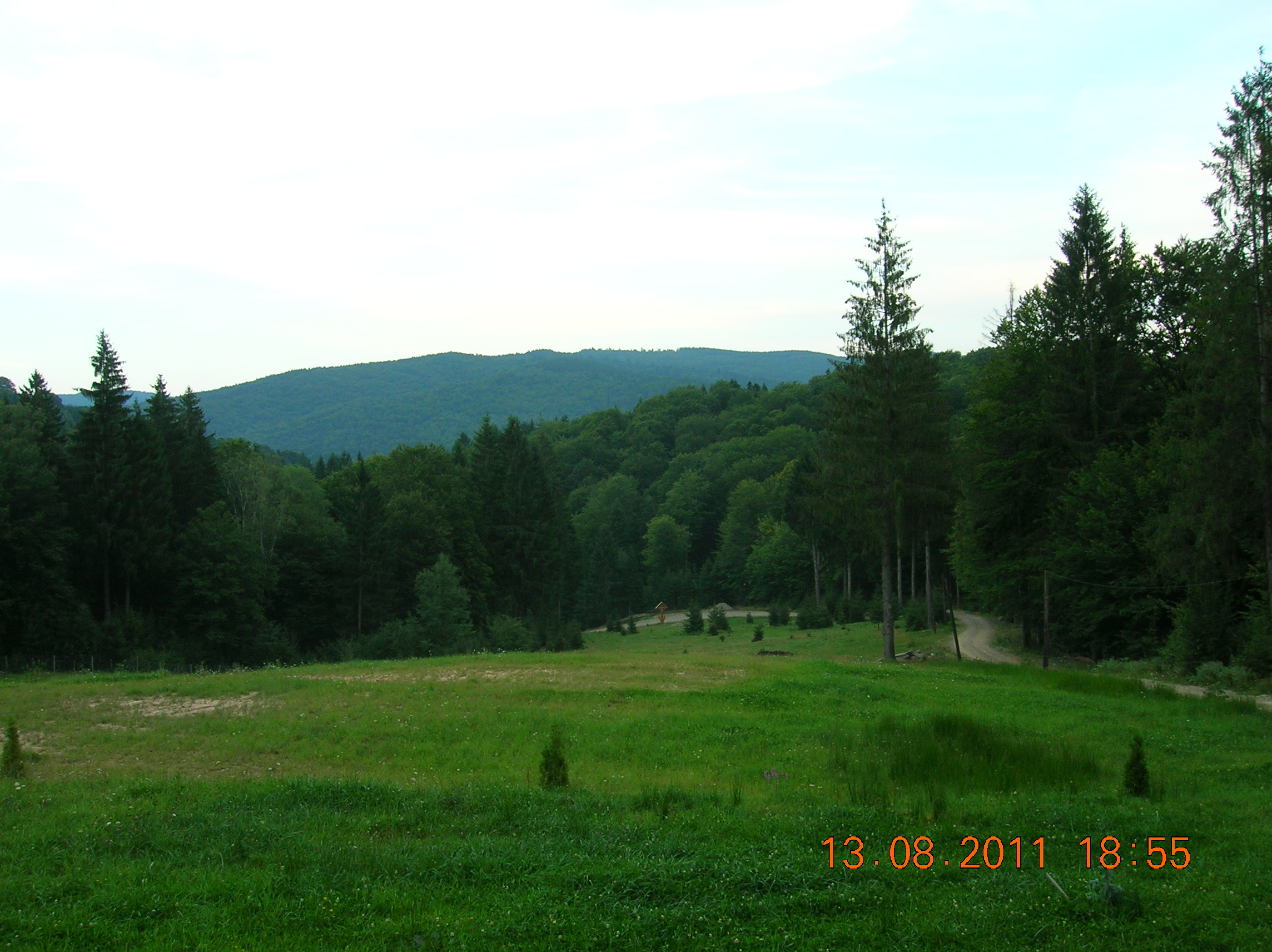
