= Tamásfalva =

Tamásfalva is the Hungarian name of:

- Tămășeni in Romania
- Hetin in Serbia
