= Gheorghe Răscănescu =

Romanian soldier (1900–1967)

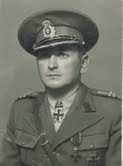
- Born: January 30, 1900; Crăcăoani, Neamț County, Kingdom of Romania
- Died: June 3, 1967 (aged 67); Ploiești, Romanian People's Republic
- Education: Military School for Infantry Officers
- Military career
- Allegiance: Kingdom of Romania
- Branch: Army
- Service years: 1922–1946
- Rank: Colonel
- Commands: 1st Battalion of 15th Regiment; 3rd Regiment of 2nd Armored Division
- Conflicts: World War II; Siege of Odessa; Battle of Stalingrad; Second Jassy–Kishinev Offensive
- Awards: Order of the Crown (Romania); Order of Michael the Brave; Knight's Cross of the Iron Cross

Gheorghe Răscănescu (30 January 1900 – 3 June 1967) was a Romanian officer during World War II.

He was born in Crăcăoani, Neamț County. After completing elementary school in his native village, he attended from 1912 to 1918 the Petru Rareș High School in Piatra Neamț. In 1920 he enrolled in the Military School for Infantry Officers in Sibiu, graduating in 1922 with the rank of second lieutenant. In 1924 he married Maria Iosub; their only child, Magda Maria Rășcănescu, was born two years later. In 1926 he was promoted to lieutenant, and in 1935 to captain. In 1940 he received the command of the 1st Battalion of the 15th Dorobanți Regiment, being promoted to the rank of major.

After Romania entered World War II on the side of the Axis, Răscănescu fought on the Eastern Front against the Soviet Red Army. During the Siege of Odessa, his battalion was one of the first units that entered the city, on October 16, 1941. He then fought with the 6th Division of the Romanian Third Army, under the command of General Mihail Lascăr. After the Romanian front was broken in November 1942 at the Battle of Stalingrad, Răscănescu and his battalion managed to escape encirclement, being the only formation of Lascăr's division to do so. Covering a distance of 140 km (87 mi) in three nights and one day, the battalion succeeded in getting to the Chir River with all its soldiers and equipment, and prevented the Soviet 8th Cavalry Division from capturing the vital German airfield at Oblivskaya from November 26 to December 3. He was a recipient of the Knight's Cross of the Iron Cross of Nazi Germany and of the Order of Michael the Brave, 3rd Class for his actions at the Battle of Stalingrad.

In June 1943 he was promoted to lieutenant-colonel and assigned to the 3rd Vânători de munte Regiment of the 2nd Armored Division. During the Second Jassy–Kishinev offensive of August 1944, he fought to defend the Pașcani–Roman railway against the Red Army onslaught. After Romania switched sides in the wake of the coup d'état of August 23, 1944, he fought in the fall of 1944 in Transylvania against the retreating German troops. He was promoted to the rank of colonel in February 1946, backdated to June 1945.

In July 1958 he was arrested by the Communist authorities, and he was sentenced in February 1959 to 10 years of forced labor for "trying to overthrow the political order." Incarcerated at Gherla Prison, he was released in November 1960. He died of a heart attack in Ploiești in 1967.

Răscănescu's memoirs were published posthumously, in 2017.

== Awards ==
- Order of the Crown of Romania, Knight rank (8 June 1940)
- Order of the Crown of Romania, Officer rank (5 August 1941)
- Knight's Cross of the Iron Cross (4 December 1942) (the lowest in rank foreign recipient of this decoration)
- Order of Michael the Brave, 3rd Class (31 March 1943), Romania's highest military decoration
