= Zahorna (Cracău) =

- Location within Romania

Location
- Country: Romania
- Counties: Neamț County
- Villages: Verșești

Physical characteristics
- Mouth: Cracău
  - coordinates: 46.9629°N 26.4815°E
- Length: 11 km (6.8 mi)

Basin features
- Progression: Cracău→ Bistrița→ Siret→ Danube→ Black Sea

The Zahorna is a left tributary of the river Cracău in Romania. It flows into the Cracău near Girov. Its length is 11 km (6.8 mi).
