= Cracăul Negru =

River in Romania

- Location within Romania

Location
- Country: Romania
- Counties: Neamț County

Physical characteristics
- Mouth: Cracău
  - coordinates: 47.1004°N 26.2511°E
- Length: 8 km (5.0 mi)
- Basin size: 29 km^{2} (11 sq mi)

Basin features
- Progression: Cracău→ Bistrița→ Siret→ Danube→ Black Sea

The Cracăul Negru is a river in Neamț County, Romania. At its confluence with the Cracăul Alb in Magazia, the river Cracău is formed. Its length is 8 km (5.0 mi) and its basin size is 29 km^{2} (11 sq mi).

== Tributaries ==
The following rivers are tributaries to the river Cracăul Negru (from source to mouth):

- Left: Aluniș, Tisa
- Right: Șoimul, Pârâul Răchitelor, Pârâul Gradului, Bălmuș
