= Nicolae Dăscălescu =

Romanian general (1884–1969)

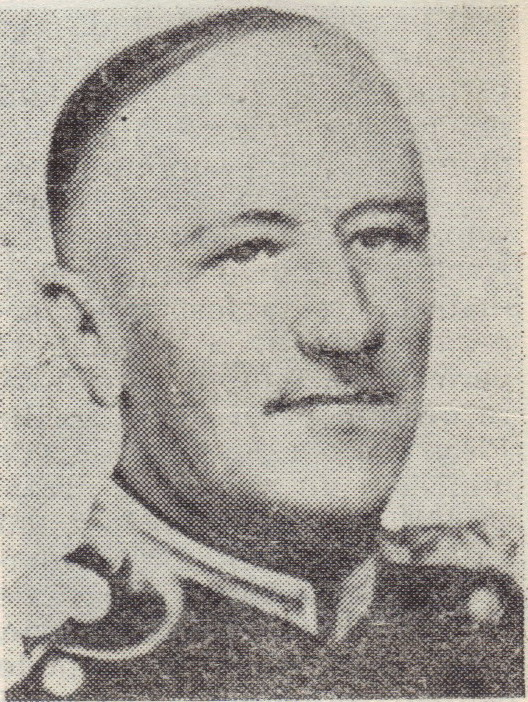
- Born: 29 June 1884; Căciulești, Neamț County, Kingdom of Romania
- Died: 28 September 1969 (aged 85); Piatra Neamț, Socialist Republic of Romania
- Burial place: Heroes Cemetery, Piatra Neamț
- Education: Carol I National Defence University
- Military career
- Allegiance: Romania
- Branch: Romanian Army
- Service years: 1908–1945
- Rank: Lieutenant general
- Commands: Fourth Army
- Conflicts: Second Balkan War; World War I; Hungarian–Romanian War; World War II; Eastern Front; Operation München; Siege of Odessa; Battle of Stalingrad; Western Carpathian Offensive; Bratislava–Brno Offensive; Prague Offensive
- Awards: Order of the Crown; Order of the Star of Romania; Order of Michael the Brave; Order of Saint Anna; Czechoslovak War Cross 1939–1945

Nicolae I. Dăscălescu (29 June 1884 – 28 September 1969) was a Romanian general during World War II.

== Biography ==
He was born in a poor peasant family in Căciulești, Neamț County, Kingdom of Romania. After completing elementary school in nearby Gura Văii village, he attended Petru Rareș High School in Piatra Neamț, and in 1906 went to study at the Military School in Bucharest, graduating in 1908 with the rank of second lieutenant. After being promoted to lieutenant in 1911, Dăscălescu served with an artillery regiment in the Second Balkan War in 1913, and then advanced to the rank of captain in the spring of 1916. He fought in World War I and the Hungarian–Romanian War and reached the rank of Major. In 1921 he was admitted to the Higher War School and by 1940 he had reached the rank of Major-General. He commanded the 25th Division (August 1939) and the 20th Division (June 1940), and 8 days after the start of Operation Barbarossa, he took over the command of the 21st Division.

With his Division, he fought bloody battles against the Soviets, including the Battle of Țiganca in Bessarabia and the Siege of Odessa (1941). Dăscălescu had distinguished himself and was promoted to lead the 2nd Romanian Corps, which was part of in the Third Army. His Corps was present at the Battle of Stalingrad and was overrun by numerical superior forces during Operation Uranus. The remnants of the Corps were withdrawn to Romania to be rebuilt and to protect the northern border.

After King Michael's Coup on 23 August 1944, the 2nd Corps turned against its former German allies, took 10,500 prisoners, and participated in the advance in Transylvania as part of the Fourth Army under command of general Gheorghe Avramescu. He temporarily replaced Avramescu at the head of the Army, when he was dismissed in January–February 1945. He became the new commander of the Fourth Army on 3 March, when Avramescu was eliminated by the NKVD. With the Fourth Army, under the command of Soviet general Rodion Malinovsky, he fought in the Bratislava–Brno Offensive and the Prague Offensive. He was gravely wounded on 25 March in the battle for Banská Bystrica, but he did not quit, and stayed on with his troops.

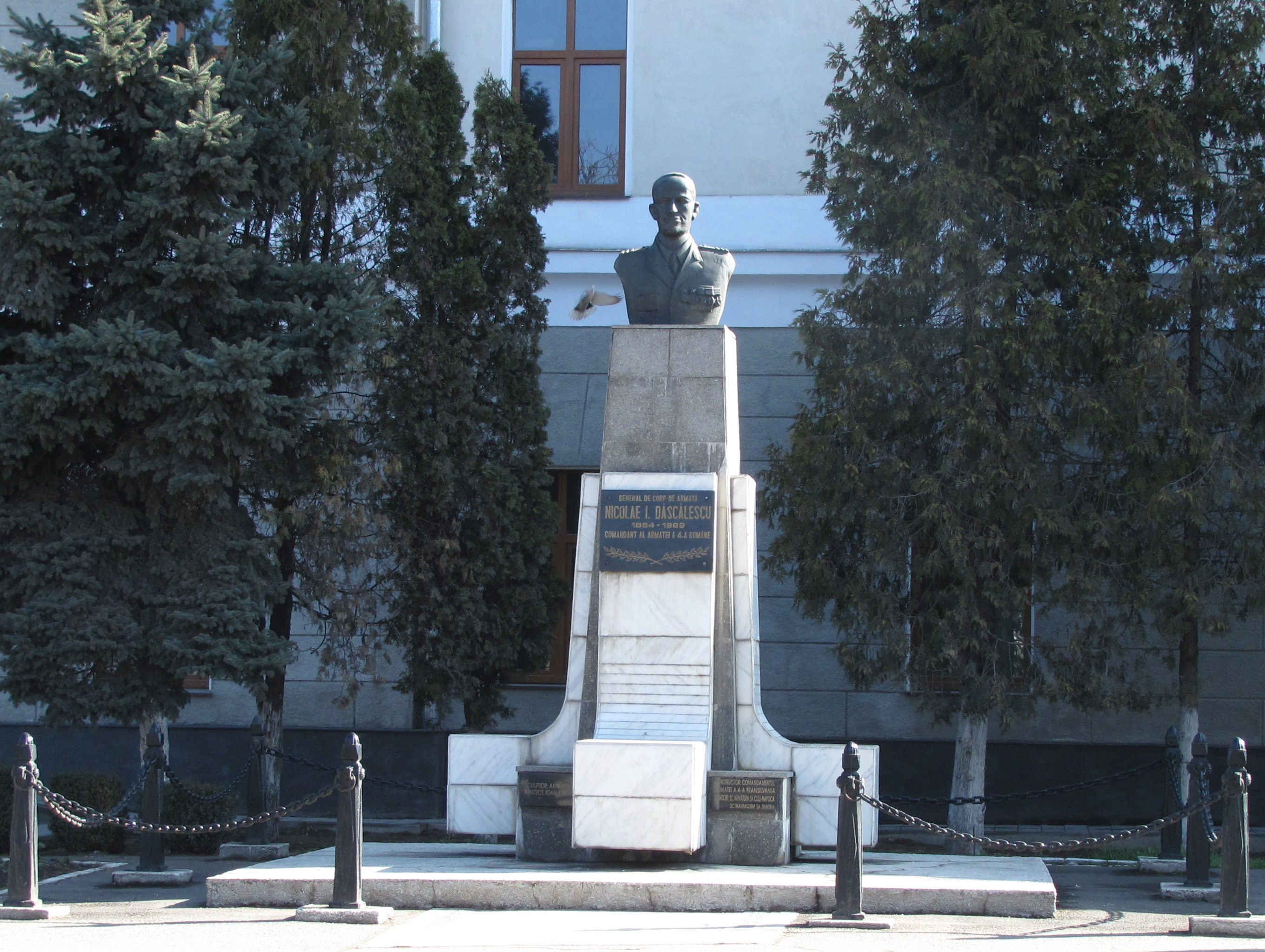
Bust of Dăscălescu in Ștefan cel Mare Plaza, Cluj-Napoca

At the end of the war, in June 1945, Dăscălescu was relieved of command and retired. In 1946, he was put on trial as a war criminal, but the court dismissed the accusations and cleared his name. Not a friend of the new Communist regime, he was further harassed until 1951, when he was thrown in the Jilava Prison for "agricultural sabotage". He was released in October 1955, and moved to Piatra Neamț. He lived the rest of his years away from public life, despite being promoted to lieutenant general. He died in 1969 in Piatra Neamț, and is buried in the city's Heroes Cemetery.

== Legacy ==
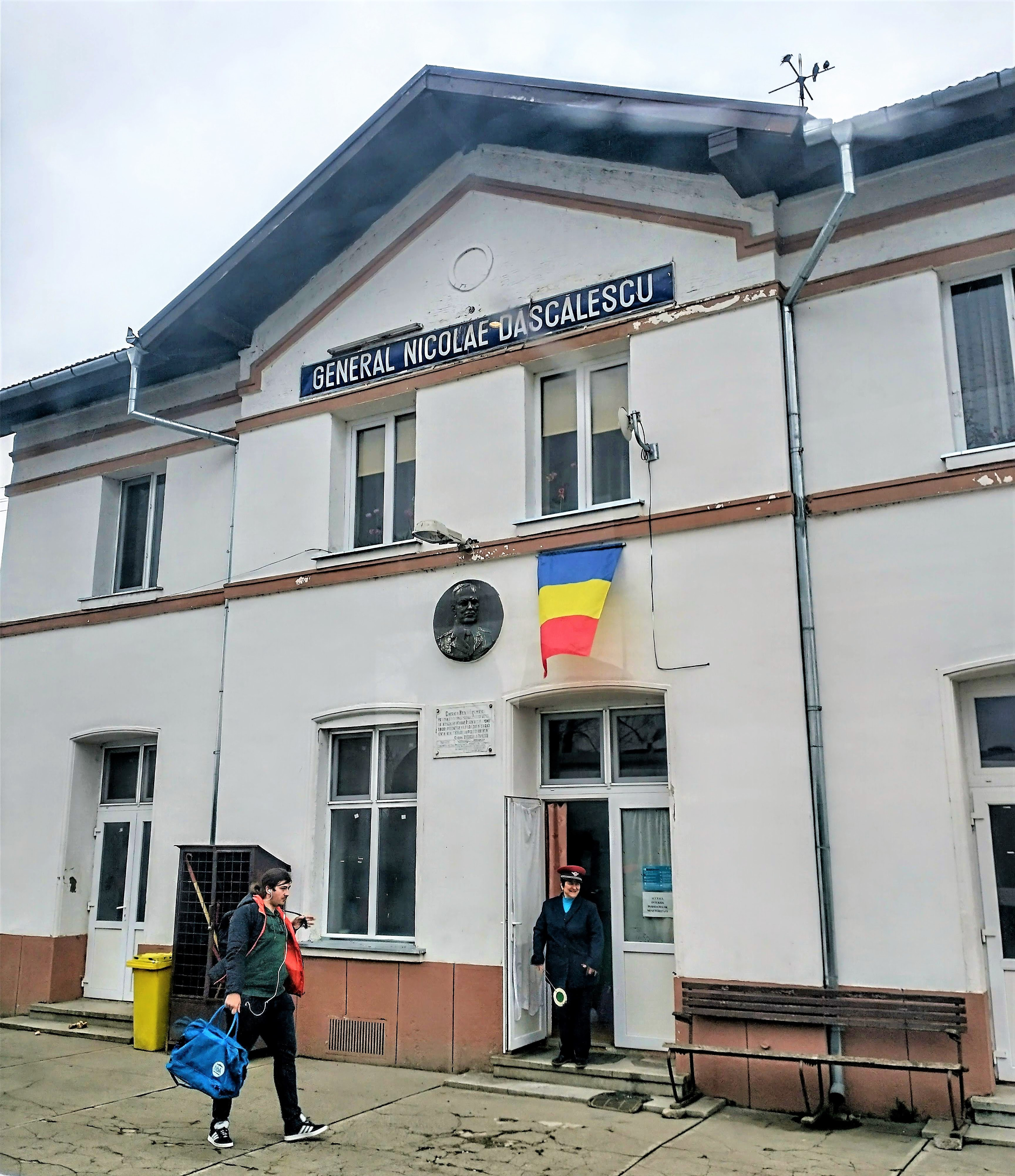
The General Nicolae Dăscălescu train station in Ungheni, Mureș

The train station in the town of Ungheni, Mureș is named after Dăscălescu. A boulevard in Piatra Neamț bears his name, and so does a street in Cluj-Napoca. A bust of Dăscălescu (commissioned by the Romanian Fourth Army) has been erected in Ștefan cel Mare Plaza, Cluj-Napoca.
