= Balmus =

Balmus may refer to:

- Bălmuș, a tributary of the river Cracăul Negru in Romania
- Balmoș or balmuș, a mămăligă-like traditional Romanian dish
- Balmus, another name for Siegfried's legendary sword, Gram (mythology)
