= Zahorna =

Zahorna may refer to several places:

- Zahorna, a village in Chițcani Commune, Căușeni district, Moldova
- Zahorna, a village in Dobrușa Commune, Șoldănești district, Moldova
- Zahorna (Cracău), a tributary of the river Cracău in Neamț County, Romania
- Zahorna, a tributary of the river Bistrița in Neamț County, Romania
