= Third Army (Romania) =

3rd Army
- Armata a 3-a
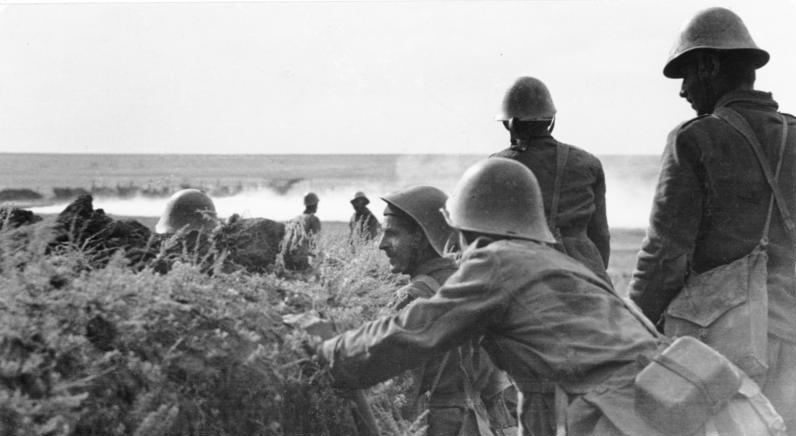
- Romanian soldiers at Stalingrad, 1942
- Active: 1916 – 1947; 1960 – 1990s?
- Country: Kingdom of Romania
- Branch: Royal Romanian Army
- Type: Field army
- Size: 70,000-100,000
- Engagements: World War I; Battle of Bazargic; First Battle of Cobadin; Second Battle of Cobadin; Flămânda Offensive; World War II; Operation München; Battle of Uman; Crimean campaign; Battle of the Sea of Azov; Siege of Sevastopol; Battle of Rostov; Battle of the Caucasus; Battle of Stalingrad; Dnieper–Carpathian offensive; Second Jassy–Kishinev offensive

Commanders
- Notable commanders: Mihail Aslan; Alexandru Averescu; Petre Dumitrescu; Dumitru I. Popescu; Nicolae Dăscălescu

The 3rd Army (Romanian: Armata a 3-a) was a field army of the Romanian Land Forces active from 1916 to the 1990s. It fought as part of the German Army Group B during World War II, in Ukraine, the Crimea, and the Caucasus. General Petre Dumitrescu commanded the 3rd Army for much of that time.

The 3rd Army contained the only Romanian divisions trained by the Germans, and as a result, it was a significantly better fighting force than the fellow 4th Army during the Battle of Stalingrad.

== World War I ==
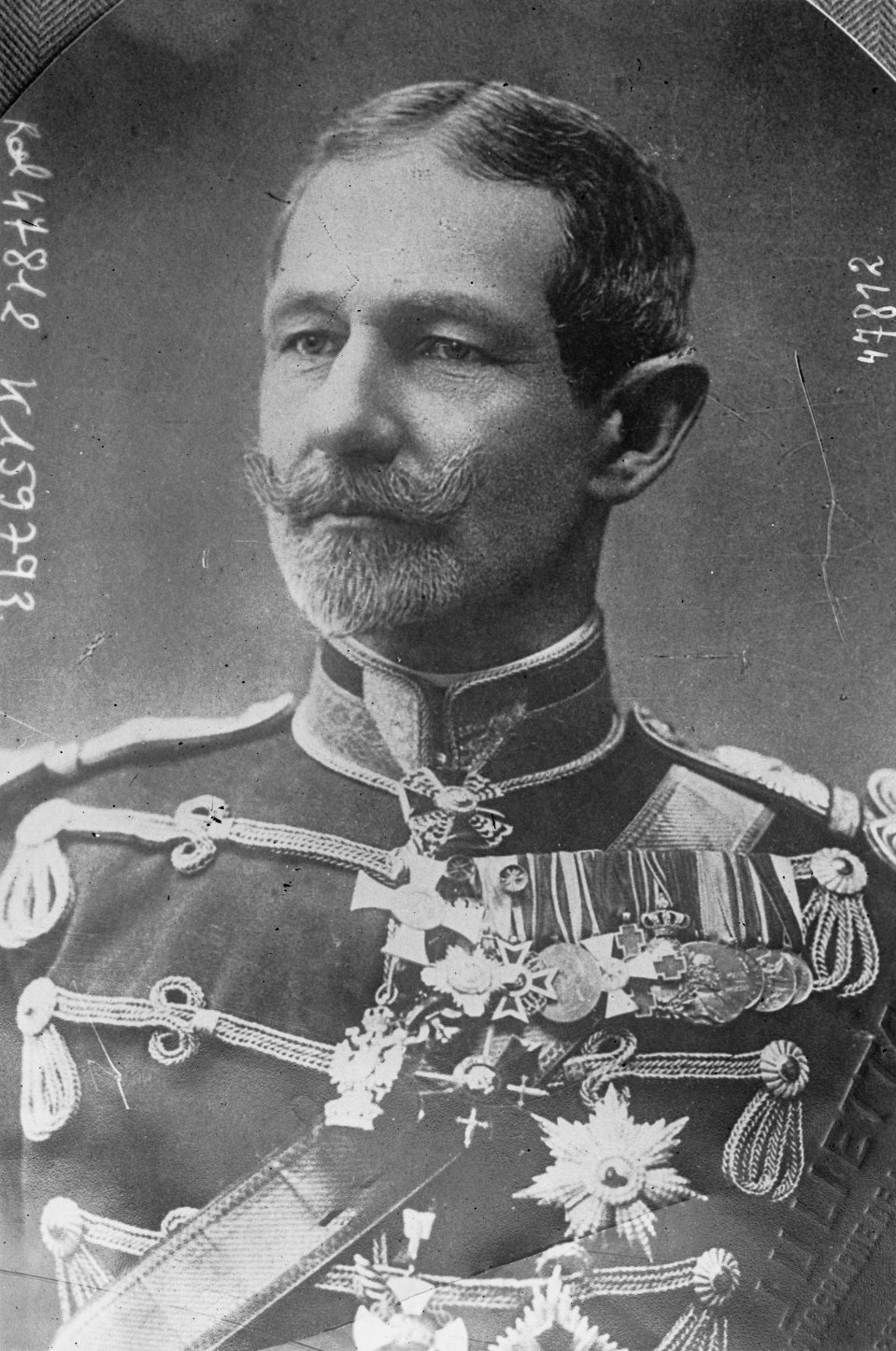
General Alexandru Averescu

After Romania entered World War I in August 1916 on the side of the Allies, the Third Army defended the border with Bulgaria, while the rest of the Romanian Army engaged in the Battle of Transylvania. When a Bulgarian-German army under August von Mackensen invaded Romania in September 1916, the Third Army made attempts to withstand the enemy offensive at Silistra, Bazargic, Amzacea and Topraisar, but had to withdraw under the pressure of superior enemy forces after the Second Battle of Cobadin. After the Flămânda Offensive, the Third Army was disbanded.

The commanders of the 3rd Army during that time were :

- Divisional General Mihail Aslan: 27 August 1916 – 7 September 1916
- Divisional General Alexandru Averescu: 7 September 1916 – 7 October 1916
- Divisional General Constantin Iancovescu: December 1916 - 24 July 1917

== World War II ==
On 22 June 1941 the 3rd Army comprised the 4th Army Corps (6th and 7th Infantry Divisions), the Cavalry Corps (5th and 8th Cavalry Brigades), the Mountain Corps (1st, 2nd, and 4th Mountain Brigades), two separate artillery battalions, a target acquisition battery, and the Air Forces's 3rd Army Cooperation Command.

For Operation München, in the north, the 3rd Army was reduced only to the Mountain Corps (the 1st, 2nd and 4th Mountain Brigades, 8th Cavalry Brigade and 7th Infantry Division), because the Cavalry Corps (5th and 6th Cavalry Brigades) had been subordinated directly to the German Eleventh Army. In fact the 3rd Army command did not have any operative attributes until 2 July 1941, when the ground offensive started also in the Romanian sector.

In 1942 in the Battle of the Caucasus, the 3rd Army initially consisted of the Cavalry Corps (5th, 6th and 9th Cavalry Divisions) and the 1st Army Corps (2nd Mountain Division and German 298th Infantry Division). The 3rd Army was subordinated to the German 17th Army. It also had 3 observation squadrons assigned to it. However, after reorganization, on 7 August, only the Cavalry Corps remained with it.

== Battle of Stalingrad ==
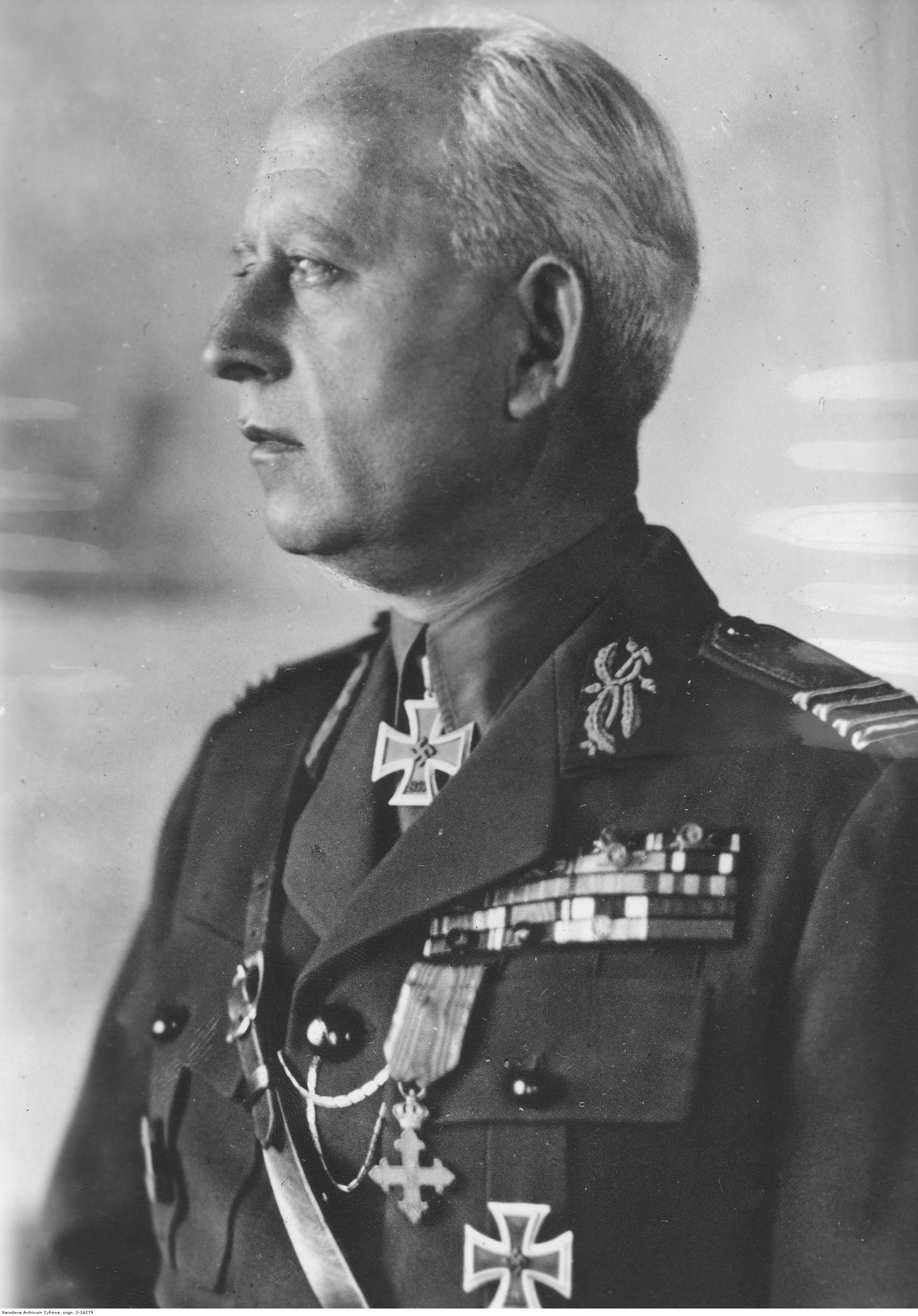
General Petre Dumitrescu in 1944

Along with the Romanian Fourth Army, the Third Army bore the brunt of the Soviet Operation Uranus, which saw the German Sixth Army encircled and destroyed during the Battle of Stalingrad.

The Romanian Third Army, commanded by General Petre Dumitrescu, was transferred from the Caucasus and replaced five Italian and two German divisions between Blij Perekopa and Bokovkaya, with the task of defending a front 138 km (86 mi) long, far beyond its capabilities. To make things worse, the Soviets had two bridgeheads over the Don River, at Serafimovich and Kletskaya, which the German High Command ignored, despite repeated requests by General Dumitrescu for permission to eliminate them. At the start of the Soviet offensive in November 1942, the Third Army had a nominal strength of 152,492 Romanian troops and 11,211 German troops, being made up from 1st, 2nd, 4th, and 5th Corps in a single echelon (1st Cavalry, 5th, 6th, 7th, 9th, 11th, 13th, and 14th Infantry Divisions) from West to East, with 7th Cavalry and 15th Infantry Divisions in reserve. The Long Range Recon (DO-17M) and the 112th Liaison Squadrons (Fleet 10G) were also at its disposal. In November came the German XLVIII Panzer Corps, composed of the 22nd German Panzer Division and the 1st Romanian Armored Division, which also was put in reserve. It also had the 2nd, 4th, 5th, and 8th Motorized Heavy Artillery Regiments and the 41st Independent Motorized Heavy Artillery Battalion. Opposite the 3rd Army was the Southwestern Front, comprising the Soviet 1st Guards Army, 5th Tank Army, and 21st Army, with a force of 5,888 artillery pieces, 728 tanks, and 790 planes.

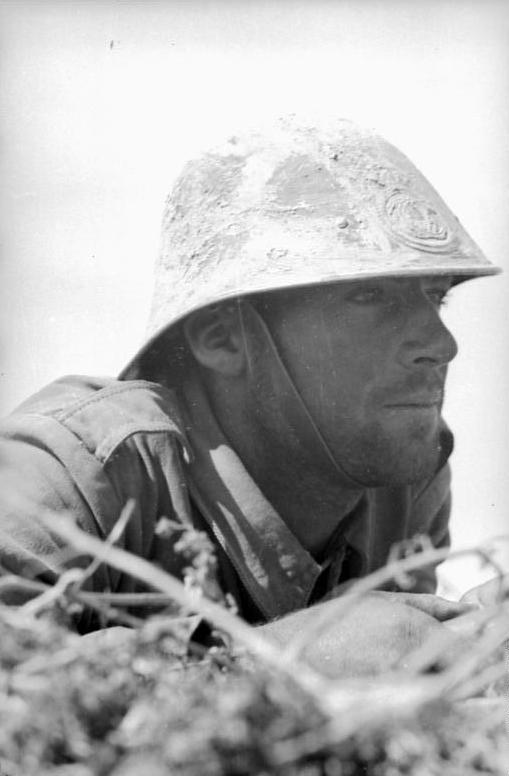
Romanian soldier at Stalingrad

On 19 November at 0530, in the sector of the Third Romanian Army, a violent artillery barrage battered the entire front line. The weather conditions were harsh: blizzards, snow, −20 °C (−4 °F), which made close air support impossible. The Soviets assaulted the positions of the 14th Infantry Division with the 5th Tank Army and the junction between the 13th Infantry Division and the 1st Cavalry Division with the 21st Army, with a total of 338,631 men against three weak divisions. The 37mm and 47mm AT guns were useless against Soviet T-34 tanks, so the Romanian troops had to use grenades, anti-tank mines and Molotov cocktails. In the first hours, they managed to delay the advance and destroy some tanks, but later they had to retreat or face encirclement. The Soviets also attacked west of Sarisa Valley and at Raspopinskaya, but were repulsed. In response to the situation that developed south of Kletskaya, the German 48th Panzer Corps was ordered to move towards the Soviet main thrust and shortly afterwards, the 22nd Panzer Division was redirected to the northwest towards Bolsoy and, reaching Petshany, it engaged Soviet armor. By evening, the 1st Romanian Armored Division reached Sirkovsky, making preparations to attack Bolsoy the next day.

In the first day of the offensive, the Soviet forces succeeded in making two large breaches in the defences of the Third Romanian Army: one in the center, 16–18 kilometres (9.9–11.2 miles) wide and 15 km (9.3 mi) deep and one in the right wing, between the Third Romanian Army and the German Sixth Army, 10–12 km wide and 35–40 km deep.

Soviet advance at Stalingrad from 19 to 28 November 1942

On 20 November, the Soviet armored and motorized forces advanced towards Kalach, with the intention of encircling the 6th Army embroiled in ferocious fighting at Stalingrad. The 22nd Panzer Division, overwhelmed at Petshany by the large number of Soviet tanks, withdrew north to Bol. Donschynka. The Romanian 1st Armored Division, without any available radio contact, tried to advance to Petshany in order to make the junction with the 22nd Panzer Division, but was forced to stop a few kilometers west of Korotovsky by stiff Soviet resistance and numerous counterattacks by Soviet tanks, flowing between the German 22nd and the Romanian 1st, occupying the Varlamovsky and Peralasovsky villages and making the junction with forces coming from Gromsky, thus encircling the 5th Corps. In the 4th Corps' sector, 40 Soviet tanks attacked the 15th Infantry Division but were repulsed by evening with heavy losses. Meanwhile, the 7th Cavalry Division unsuccessfully tried to block the enemy's advance; the right wing of the division, which had fully received the blow, retreated south while the left wing was reassigned to the 9th Infantry Division. Also, the 1st Cavalry Division had to retreat towards Stalingrad and was subordinated to the 6th Army.

At the end of the day, the defensive position of the Third Romanian Army had a 70 km wide gap in the centre. In this pocket were encircled the 1st Armored Division, three infantry divisions (5th, 6th, and 15th), and remains of other two infantry divisions (13th and 14th). The former commander of the 6th Infantry Division, Major General Mihail Lascăr, took command of the troops from the infantry divisions and formed the "General Lascăr" Group (40,000 men). At this point, the command point of the Third Army began moving to Morozovskaya.

On 21 November, the 22nd Panzer Division tried to advance towards Perelasovsky in order to make the junction with the 1st Armored Division and to relieve the "General Lascăr" Group, but failed and was stopped the next day between Bol. Donschynka and Perelasovky. The 1st Romanian Armored Division advanced towards Bol. Donschynka, where it was hoping to find the German division, but the village was under Soviet control and then headed south and, after grim fighting, crossed the Chir River on 25 November.

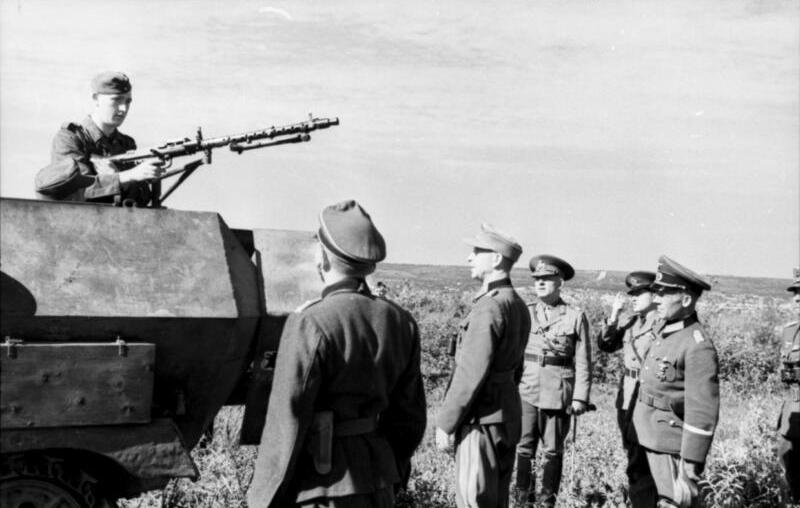
Romanian soldiers in 1944, demonstrating Maschinengewehr 34

On 22 November, the encircled "General Lascăr" Group, which had been ordered to resist at any cost, was attacked and transmitted its last message. They had run out of food and each gun had only 40 rounds left and after refusing the Soviet proposal to surrender they were entirely destroyed. Only the 1st Battalion of the 15 Infantry Regiment (6th infantry Division), commanded by Major Gheorghe Răscănescu, succeeded in getting to the Chir River with all its soldiers and equipment. His battalion had managed to prevent the Soviet 8th Cavalry Division from capturing the vital German airfield at Oblivskaya from 26 November to 3 December.

On 23 November, the Soviet troops of the South-Western Front and of the Stalingrad Front met at Kalach-na-Donu, completing the encirclement of the German 6th Army, parts of the Romanian 4th Army, and six other Romanian infantry divisions as well as one cavalry division.

=== World War II Commanders ===
No.	Portrait	Commander	Took office	Left office	Time in office	Defence branch	Ref.
1	Petre Dumitrescu	General lieutenant Petre Dumitrescu (1882–1950)	25 March 1941	20 March 1943	1 year, 360 days	Royal Romanian Army	–
2	Dumitru I. Popescu [ro]	General lieutenant Dumitru I. Popescu (1883–1970)	21 March 1943	20 April 1943	30 days	Royal Romanian Army	–
(1)	Petre Dumitrescu	General; Petre Dumitrescu (1882–1950)	21 April 1943	29 August 1944	2 years, 130 days	Royal Romanian Army	–
4	Nicolae Dăscălescu	General lieutenant Nicolae Dăscălescu (1884–1969)	29 August 1944	10 September 1944	12 days	Royal Romanian Army	

== Later in the war and postwar ==
It later fought as part of a Soviet Front after Romania changed sides.

From 1947, all four Armies of Romania were transformed into "Military Regions". The 3rd Military Region was headquartered in Cluj. In 1960 the Military Regions were reorganized in two armies: the 2nd and the 3rd Army. Following the 1980 restructure of the Romanian Army, four armies were once again created from the previous two, with the 3rd Army being headquartered in Craiova. The 1989 order of battle of the Third Army was:

3rd Army Command – Craiova with General Dumitru Roșu as Army Commander, had:

- 2nd Mechanised Division "Mihai Viteazul" (Cat B) – Craiova: with TR-85 and T-34 tanks, TAB-71M and BTR-60PB APCs, ABC-79M and BRDM-2 Recce. Armd. Vehicles, S-60 57mm and Md.1980 30mm AA Guns, M-30 122mm and Md.1981 152mm howitzers, APR-40 122mm MRLs.
- 18th Mechanized Division "Decebal" (Cat B) – Timișoara with T-55 and T-34 tanks, TAB-71 & BTR-60PB APCs, TABC-79 & BRDM-2 Recce. Armd. Vehicles, S-60 57mm and Md.1980 30mm AA Guns, M-30 122mm and Md.1981 152mm howitzers, APR-21 122mm MRLs, 9K52 Luna-M rocket systems.
- 7th Tank Brigade – Slatina: with TR-85 tanks, TAB-71M APCs, MLI-84 IFVs, TABC-79 Recce. Armd. Vehicles, Md.1980 30mm AA Guns, M-30 122mm and Md.1981 152mm howitzers, APR-40 122mm MRLs.
- 5th Mountain Brigade – Alba Iulia.
