= Mihail Aslan =

Romanian general (1857-1936)

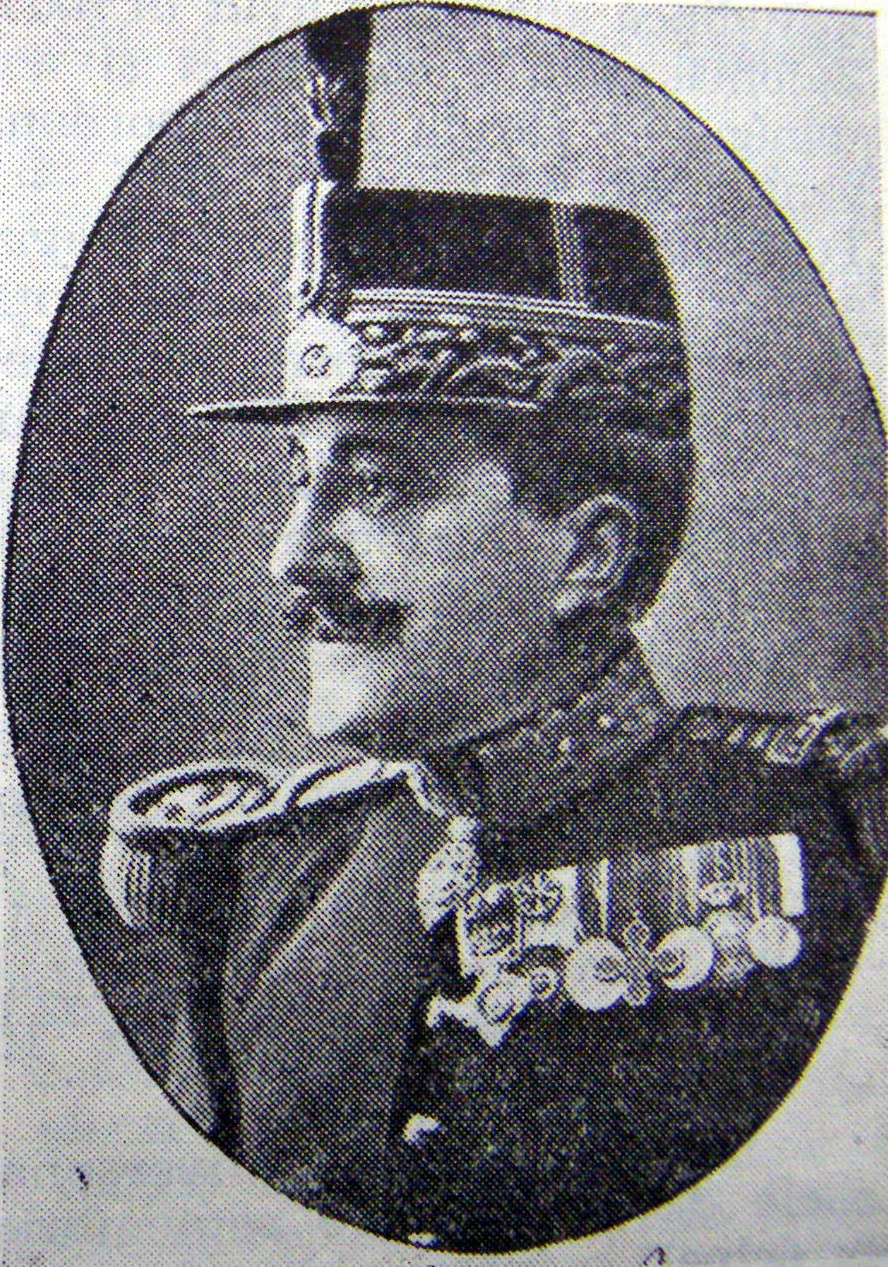
- Born: 10 August 1857; Onești, Bacău, Moldavia
- Died: 1936 (aged 79); Bucharest, Romania
- Military career
- Allegiance: Romania
- Service years: 1877 — 1918
- Rank: Lieutenant (1877); Lieutenant (1880); Captain (1882); Major (1890); Lieutenant-Colonel (1896); Colonel (1901); Brigadier General (1908); Major General (1914)
- Commands: Third Army
- Conflicts: Russo-Turkish War (1877–1878); Second Balkan War; World War I; Romanian Campaign

Mihail Ceaur-Aslan was one of the generals of the Romanian Army in the First World War.

He served as commander of the 3rd Army between 14/27 August - 25 August / 7 September 1916, when his command was lifted due to the defective way in which he led military actions that resulted in the serious defeat at the Battle of Turtucaia.

== Early life and family ==
Mihail Aslan was born in Onești, in the family of the hetman Alecu Ceaur-Aslan, being the eleventh son of the twelve of the hetman and the sixth of his second marriage to Felicia Moser. He was of Armenian descent.

He was married to Eliza Olănescu.

== Military career ==
After graduating from the military school of officers with the rank of lieutenant, Mihail Aslan was assigned to the 2nd Hunters Battalion, a unit in which he participated in the military actions of the war of independence from 1877 to 1878. In 1880 he was moved to the 27th Dorobanti Bacau Regiment, and after advancing to the rank of captain, in 1882, he was moved to the School of Sons of Soldiers in Craiova. He also held various positions in Regiments 10 (1883-1885), 3 (1886-1889) and 26 Dorobanti (1890-1893). Between 1893 and 1896 he was commander of the 2nd Hunters Battalion, from where he was moved as director of studies and professor at the Military School of Infantry and Cavalry (1897-1901)

He was commander of: 22nd Dâmbovița Regiment (1901-1903), 27th Bacău Regiment (1903-1907) and 15th Infantry Brigade (1907-1910).

He later worked in the central administration of the Ministry of War as senior director of personnel (1910-1912), senior director of infantry (1912-1913) and technical inspector of the same weapon (1914).

During the Second Balkan War he commanded the 3rd Infantry Division, and in October 1913 he was appointed commander of the 3rd Army Corps.

During the First World War he served as commander of the 3rd Army, and after his dismissal from command, he commanded, from 1 January 1917, with the 2nd Territorial Corps. On 30 April 1918 he resigned and was transferred to the reserves.

== Other works ==
- Regulation of Infantry Exercises, Bucharest, 1906 (translation, 1909)
- Memorandum on the fall of the bridgehead Turtucaia, Iași (1918)
- Turtucaia. Strategic study, Bucharest, 1921

== Awards ==
- Order of the Star of Romania (Knight in 1895 and Officer in 1907)
- Order of the Crown
- Cross of the Danube Crossing
- Russian War Commemorative Medal of 1877-1878

=== Foreign Awards ===
- Austria-Hungary Order of Franz Joseph
- Empire of Japan: Order of the Sacred Treasure

== Bibliography ==
- Falkenhayn, Erich von, The 9th Army Campaign against Romanians and Russians, Atelierele Grafice Socec & Co SA, Bucharest, 1937
- Kiritescu, Constantin, History of the war for the unification of Romania, Scientific and Encyclopedic Publishing House, Bucharest, 1989
- Ioanițiu Alexandru (Lt.-Colonel), The Romanian War: 1916–1918, vol 1, Genius Printing House, Bucharest, 1929
    - , Romania in the World War 1916–1919, Documents, Annexes, Volume 1, Official Gazette and State Printing, Bucharest, 1934
    - , The General Headquarters of the Romanian Army. Documents 1916 - 1920, Machiavelli Publishing House, Bucharest, 1996
    - , Military History of the Romanian People, vol. V, Military Publishing House, Bucharest, 1989
    - , Romania during the First World War, Military Publishing House, Bucharest, 1987
    - , Romania in the First World War, Military Publishing House, 1979
