= Dochia, Neamț =

Dochia
- Commune
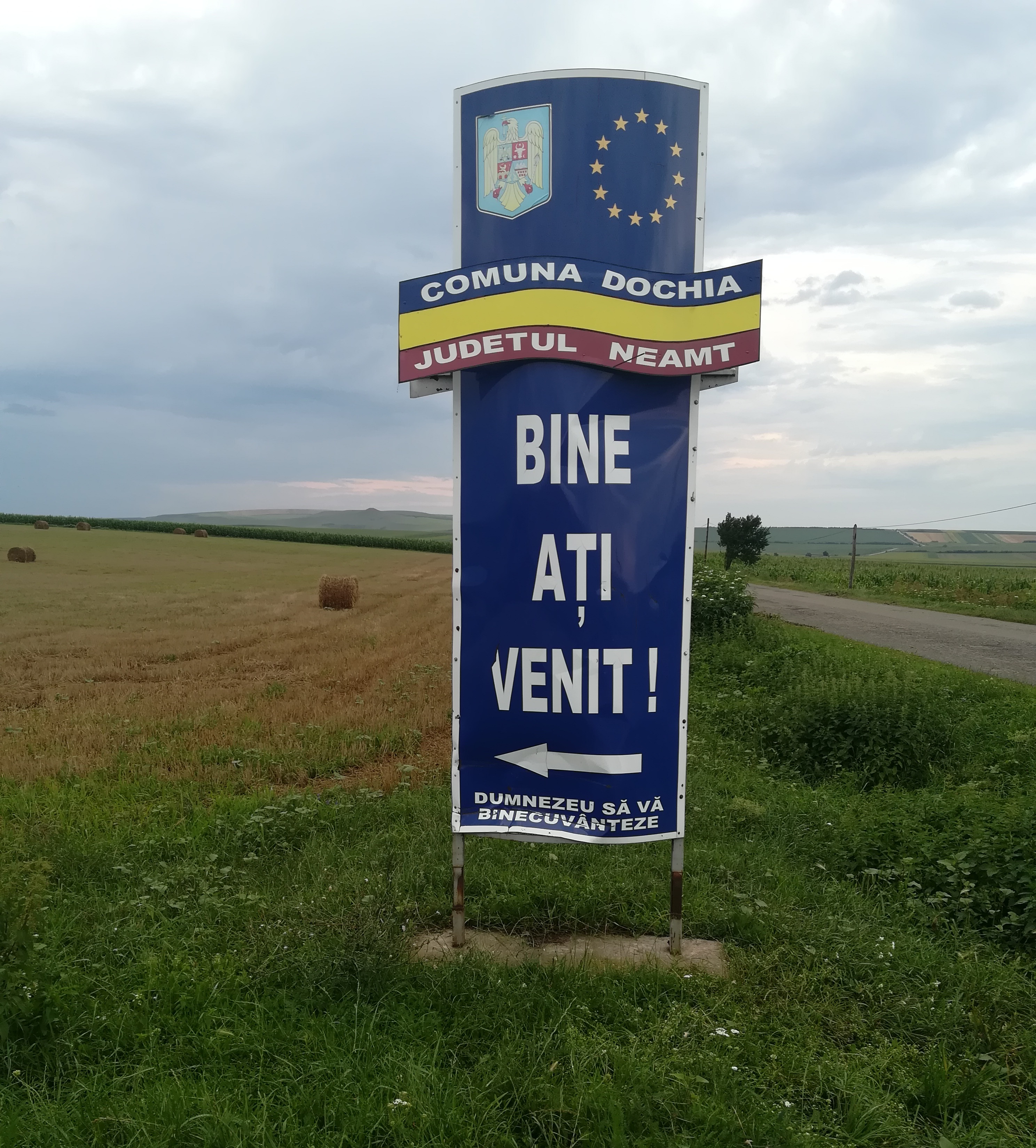
- Entrance sign to Dochia

- Location in Neamț County

- Location in Romania
- Coordinates: 46°54′N 26°33′E
- Country: Romania
- County: Neamț

Government
  - Mayor (2024–2028): Constantin Păduraru (PSD)
- Area: 31.24 km^{2} (12.06 sq mi)
- Elevation: 315 m (1,033 ft)
- Population (2021-12-01): 2,051
  - Density: 65.65/km^{2} (170.0/sq mi)
- Time zone: UTC+02:00 (EET)
  - Summer (DST): UTC+03:00 (EEST)
- Postal code: 617216
- Area code: (40) 233
- Vehicle reg.: NT
- Website: comunadochia.ro

Dochia is a commune in Neamț County, Western Moldavia, Romania. It is composed of two villages, Bălușești and Dochia. These were part of Bahna Commune from 1864 to 1880, an independent commune from 1880 to 1968, part of Girov Commune from 1968 to 2003, and independent again since that year.

The commune is located in the central part of Neamț County, 18 km (11 mi) east of the county seat, Piatra Neamț. La Its neighbors are Ștefan Cel Mare commune to the north, the city of Roznov to the south, Mărgineni commune to the east, and Săvinești commune to the west.

Historical population
| Year | Pop. | ±% |
|---|---|---|
| 1992 | 2,394 | — |
| 2002 | 2,427 | +1.4% |
| 2011 | 2,187 | −9.9% |
| 2021 | 2,051 | −6.2% |
Source: Census data

== Natives ==
- Elena Avram (born 1954), rower
