= Răucești =

- Commune
- Location in Neamț County

- Location in Romania
- Coordinates: 47°15′N 26°25′E
- Country: Romania
- County: Neamț

Government
  - Mayor (2020–2024): Dumitru Bălăjel (PNL)
- Area: 77.1 km^{2} (29.8 sq mi)
- Elevation: 325 m (1,066 ft)
- Population (2021-12-01): 7,588
  - Density: 98.4/km^{2} (255/sq mi)
- Time zone: UTC+02:00 (EET)
  - Summer (DST): UTC+03:00 (EEST)
- Postal code: 617370
- Area code: +(40) 233
- Vehicle reg.: NT
- Website: primariaraucesti.ro

Răucești is a commune in Neamț County, Western Moldavia, Romania. It is composed of four villages: Oglinzi, Răucești, Săvești, and Ungheni.

The commune is situated on the Moldavian Plateau, at an altitude of 325 m (1,066 ft), on the banks of the Moldova River and its right tributary, the Râșca. It is located in the northern part of the county, just north of the town of Târgu Neamț and 45 km (28 mi) from the county seat, Piatra Neamț, on the border with Suceava County.

The Vânători-Neamț Natural Park is partly located on the administrative territory of the commune.

Historical population
| Year | Pop. | ±% |
|---|---|---|
| 1992 | 8,205 | — |
| 2002 | 8,263 | +0.7% |
| 2011 | 7,781 | −5.8% |
| 2021 | 7,588 | −2.5% |
Source: Census data
