= Bodești =

- Commune
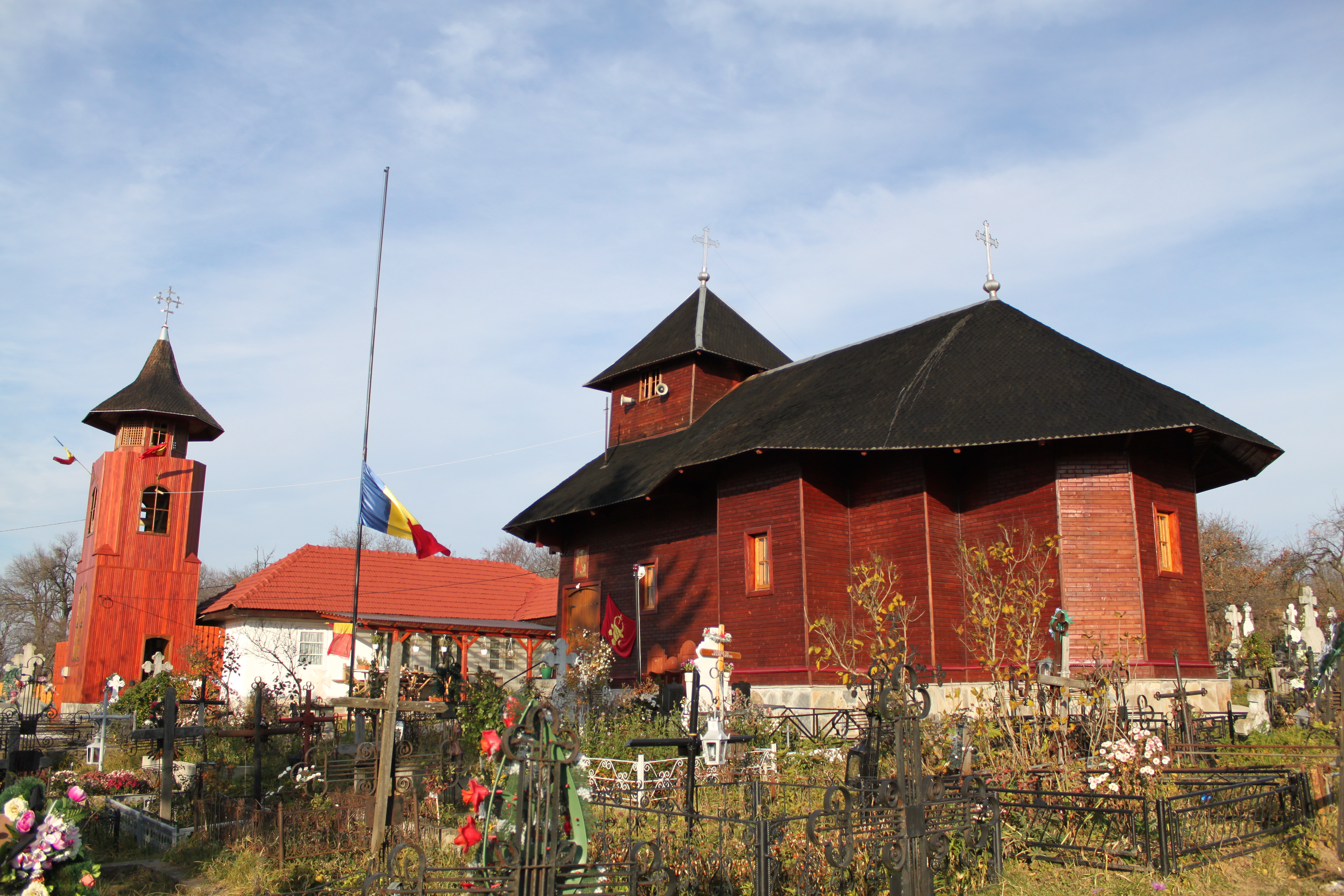
- Wooden church in Corni

- Location in Neamț County

- Location in Romania
- Coordinates: 47°01′N 26°26′E
- Country: Romania
- County: Neamț

Government
  - Mayor (2024–2028): Marinel Barna (PSD)
- Area: 63.43 km^{2} (24.49 sq mi)
- Elevation: 413 m (1,355 ft)
- Population (2021-12-01): 4,286
  - Density: 67.57/km^{2} (175.0/sq mi)
- Time zone: UTC+02:00 (EET)
  - Summer (DST): UTC+03:00 (EEST)
- Postal code: 617070
- Area code: +(40) 233
- Vehicle reg.: NT
- Website: www.bodesti.ro

Bodești is a commune in Neamț County, Western Moldavia, Romania. It is composed of four villages: Bodești, Bodeștii de Jos, Corni, and Oșlobeni.

The commune is located in the central part of the county, on the banks of the river Cracău.

Historical population
Year	Pop.	±%
2002	5,163	—
2011	4,472	−13.4%
2021	4,286	−4.2%
Source: Census data
