= Moldoveni, Neamț =

Moldoveni
- Commune
- Location in Neamț County

- Location in Romania
- Coordinates: 46.8292°N 26.7973°E
- Country: Romania
- County: Neamț

Government
  - Mayor (2024–2028): Marcel-Ioan Bârjoveanu (PNL)
- Area: 40.37 km^{2} (15.59 sq mi)
- Elevation: 266 m (873 ft)
- Population (2021-12-01): 1,972
  - Density: 48.85/km^{2} (126.5/sq mi)
- Time zone: UTC+02:00 (EET)
  - Summer (DST): UTC+03:00 (EEST)
- Postal code: 617275
- Area code: +(40) 233
- Vehicle reg.: NT
- Website: www.comunamoldoveni.ro

Moldoveni is a commune in Neamț County, Western Moldavia, Romania. It is composed of two villages, Hociungi and Moldoveni.

Historical population
Year	Pop.	±%
1992	2,854	—
2002	2,536	−11.1%
2011	2,207	−13.0%
2021	1,972	−10.6%
Source: Census data

== Natives ==
- Panait Donici (1825–1905), engineer and politician
