= Cracău =

River in Romania

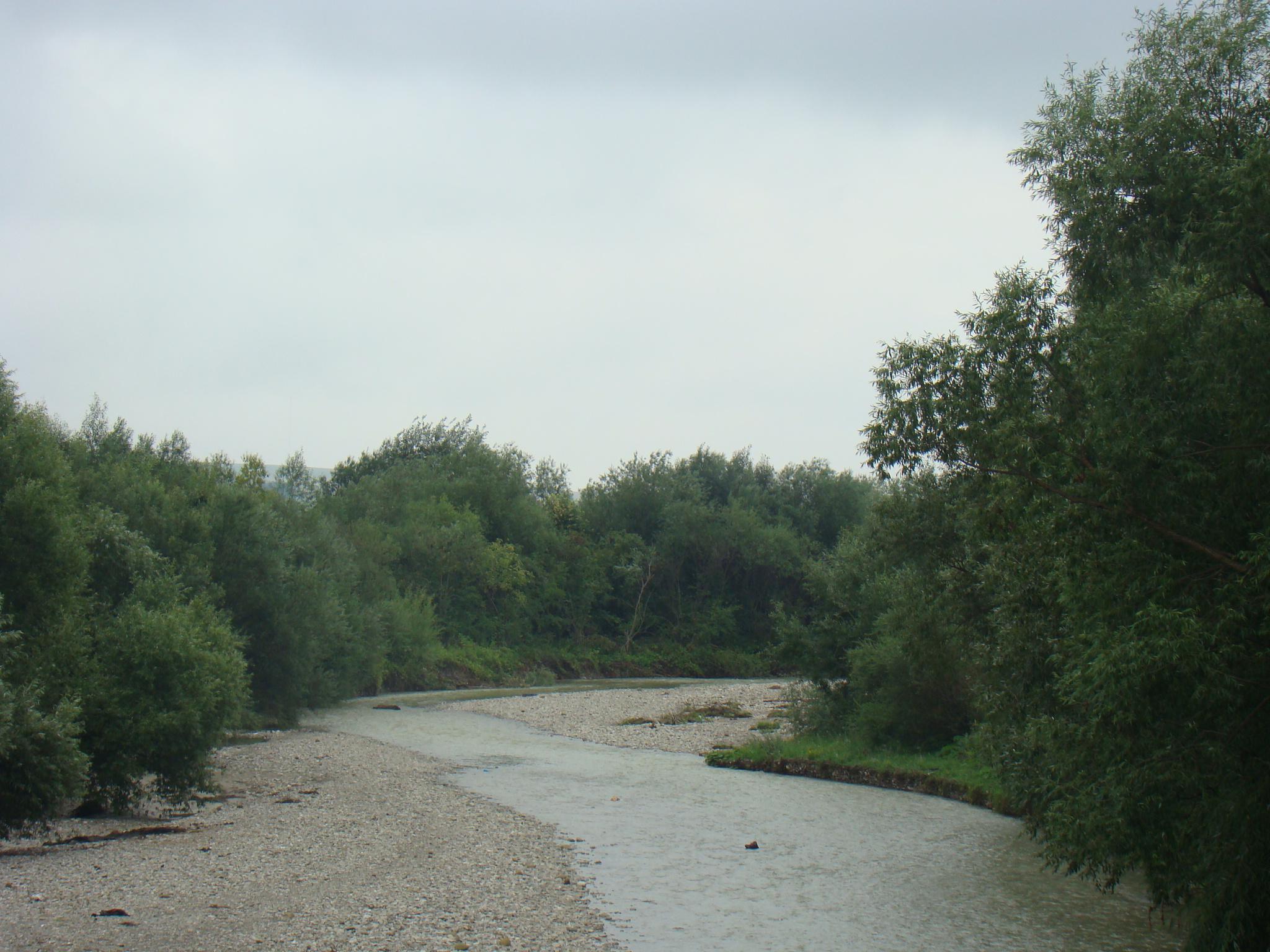

- Location within Romania

Location
- Country: Romania
- Counties: Neamț County
- Villages: Crăcăoani, Bodești, Girov, Roznov

Physical characteristics
- Source: Confluence of headwaters Cracăul Alb and Cracăul Negru
  - location: Magazia
  - coordinates: 47.1004°N 26.2511°E
- Mouth: Bistrița
  - location: Roznov
  - coordinates: 46.8181°N 26.5259°E
- Length: 66 km (41 mi)
- Basin size: 447 km^{2} (173 sq mi)

Basin features
- Progression: Bistrița→ Siret→ Danube→ Black Sea

The Cracău is a left tributary of the river Bistrița in Romania. It is formed at the confluence of its headwaters Cracăul Alb and Cracăul Negru in Magazia. It discharges into the Bistrița in Roznov. Its length is 66 km (41 mi) (including its source river Cracăul Alb) and its basin size is 447 km^{2} (173 sq mi).

== Tributaries ==
The following rivers are tributaries to the river Cracău (from source to mouth):

- Left: Cracăul Alb, Burloaia, Zahorna, Bahna
- Right: Cracăul Negru, Purcăroaia, Burdaleuca, Almaș
