= Girov =

- Commune
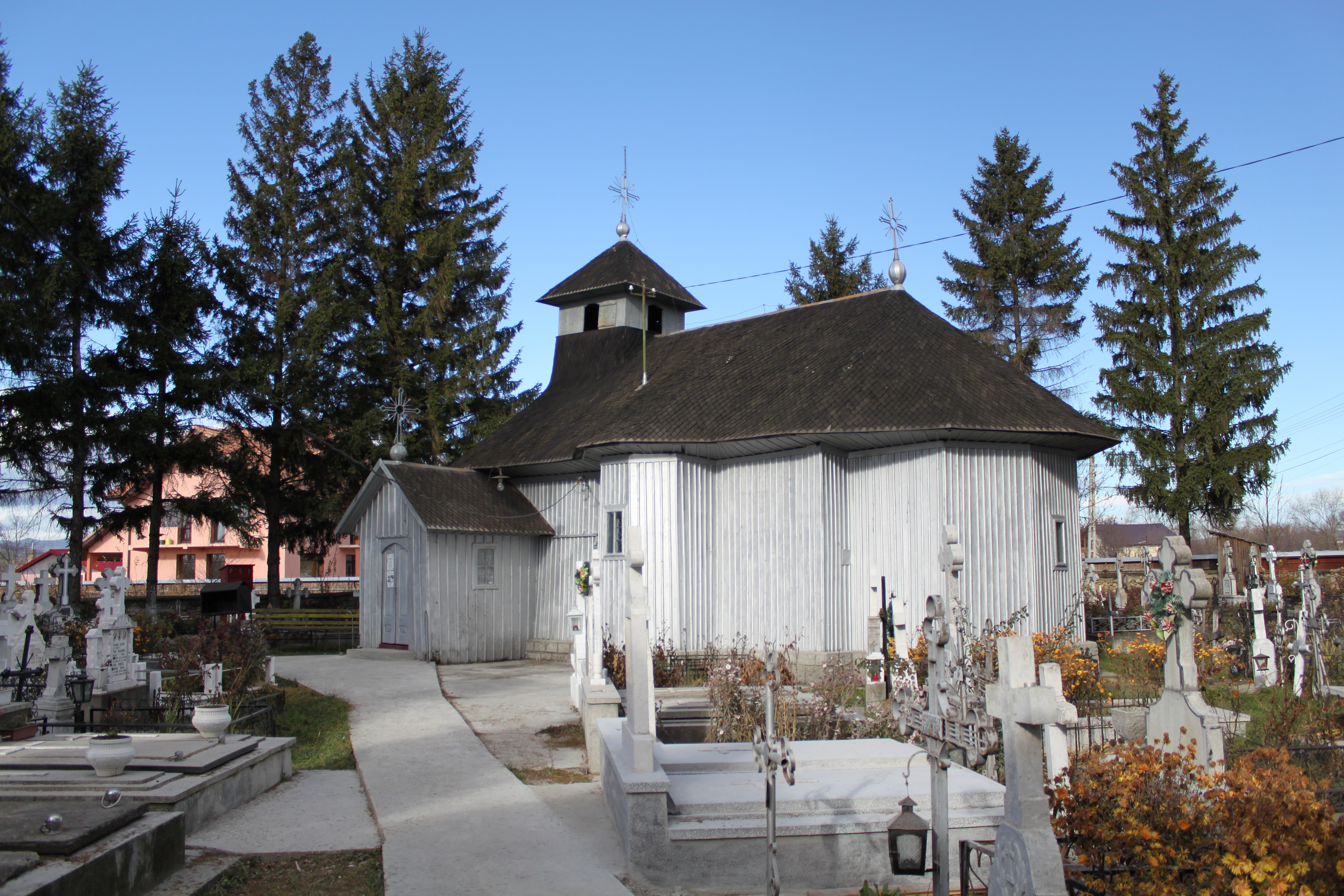
- Wooden church in Girov (Conțești)

- Location in Neamț County

- Location in Romania
- Coordinates: 46°57′N 26°31′E
- Country: Romania
- County: Neamț

Government
  - Mayor (2020–2024): Vasile Ciubotaru (PSD)
- Area: 77.49 km^{2} (29.92 sq mi)
- Elevation: 334 m (1,096 ft)
- Population (2021-12-01): 4,760
  - Density: 61.4/km^{2} (159/sq mi)
- Time zone: UTC+02:00 (EET)
  - Summer (DST): UTC+03:00 (EEST)
- Postal code: 617208
- Area code: +(40) 233
- Vehicle reg.: NT
- Website: www.girov.ro

Girov is a commune in Neamț County, Western Moldavia, Romania. It is composed of nine villages: Boțești, Căciulești, Dănești, Doina, Girov, Gura Văii, Popești, Turturești, and Verșești. It also included Bălușești and Dochia villages from 1968 to 2003, when these were split off to form Dochia Commune.

The commune is located 11 km (6.8 mi) east of Piatra Neamț, on the road DN15D from Piatra Neamț to Roman, in the Cracău river valley.

Historical population
Year	Pop.	±%
1890	1,903	—
1992	4,698	+146.9%
2002	4,988	+6.2%
2011	4,645	−6.9%
2021	4,760	+2.5%
Source: Census data

== Natives ==
- Nicolae Dăscălescu (1884 – 1969), general during World War II
- Ovidiu Marc (born 1968), footballer
