= Tămășeni =

- Commune
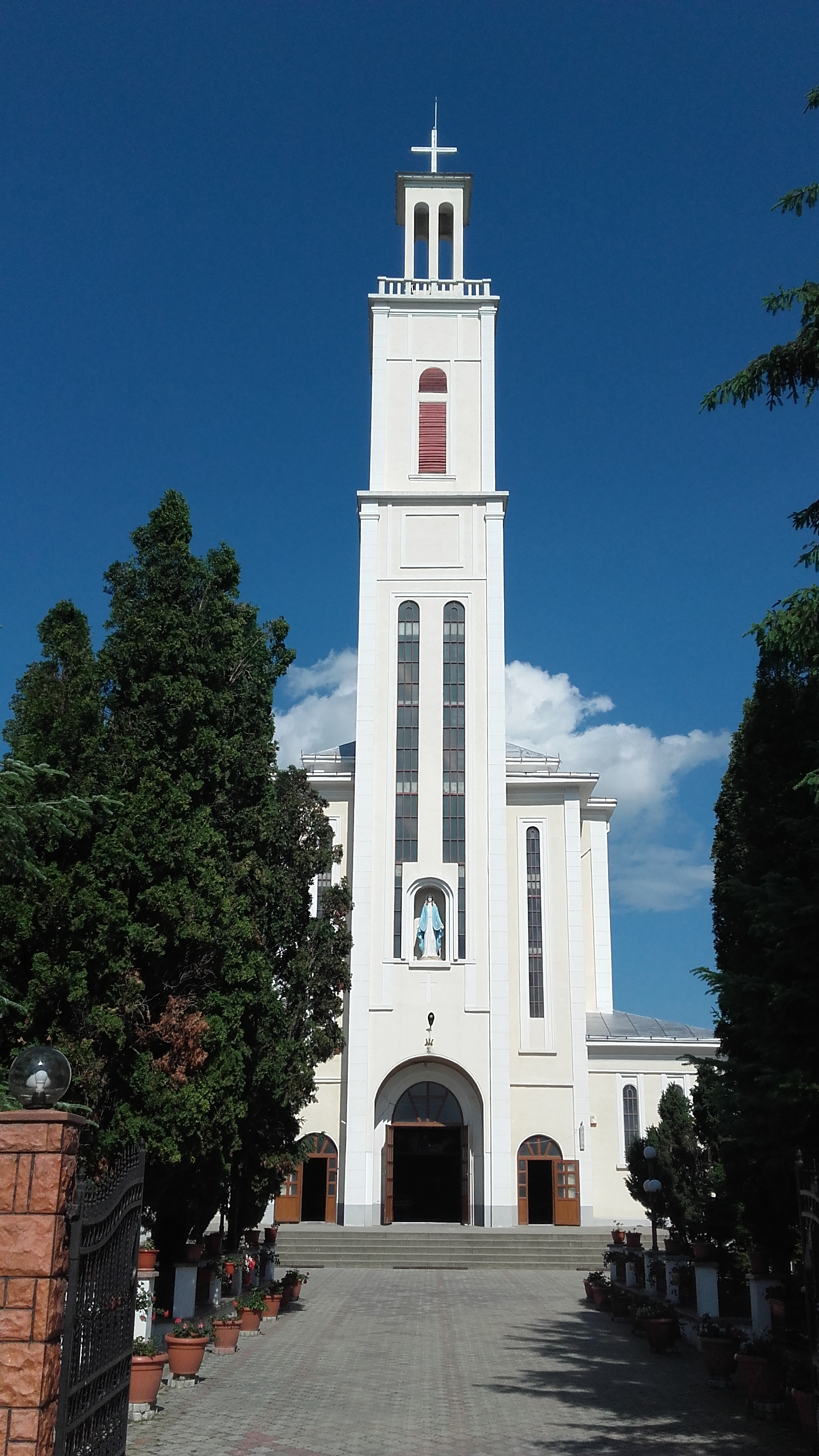
- Roman Catholic church in Tămășeni

- Location in Neamț County

- Location in Romania
- Coordinates: 46.994°N 26.9505°E
- Country: Romania
- County: Neamț

Government
  - Mayor (2024–2028): Ștefan Lucaci (PNL)
- Area: 23.48 km^{2} (9.07 sq mi)
- Elevation: 186 m (610 ft)
- Population (2021-12-01): 6,958
  - Density: 296.3/km^{2} (767.5/sq mi)
- Time zone: UTC+02:00 (EET)
  - Summer (DST): UTC+03:00 (EEST)
- Postal code: 617465
- Area code: +(40) 233
- Vehicle reg.: NT
- Website: comunatamaseni.ro

Tămășeni (Hungarian: Tamásfalva) is a commune in Neamț County, Western Moldavia, Romania. It is composed of two villages, Adjudeni (Dzsidafalva) and Tămășeni.

The commune is situated on the Moldavian Plateau, at an altitude of 186 m (610 ft), on the right bank of the Siret River. It is located in the eastern part of Neamț County, 8 km (5 mi) north of Roman and 57 km (35 mi) east of the county seat, Piatra Neamț, on the border with Iași County. Tămășeni is crossed by county road DJ201C, which connects it to the city of Roman and to national road DN2 (part of European route E85).

Historical population
Year	Pop.	±%
1992	9,062	—
2002	8,263	−8.8%
2011	6,493	−21.4%
2021	6,958	+7.2%
Source: Census data

At the 2002 census, the commune had 8,263 inhabitants, 99.9% being ethnic Romanians; 99% were Roman Catholic and 0.8% Romanian Orthodox. At the 2011 census, Tămășeni had a population of 6,493, with 94.79% Romanians, while at the 2021 census, the population was 6,958, with 92.31% Romanians.

Adjudeni village is the site of a monumental Roman Catholic church.
