= Crăcăoani =

- Commune
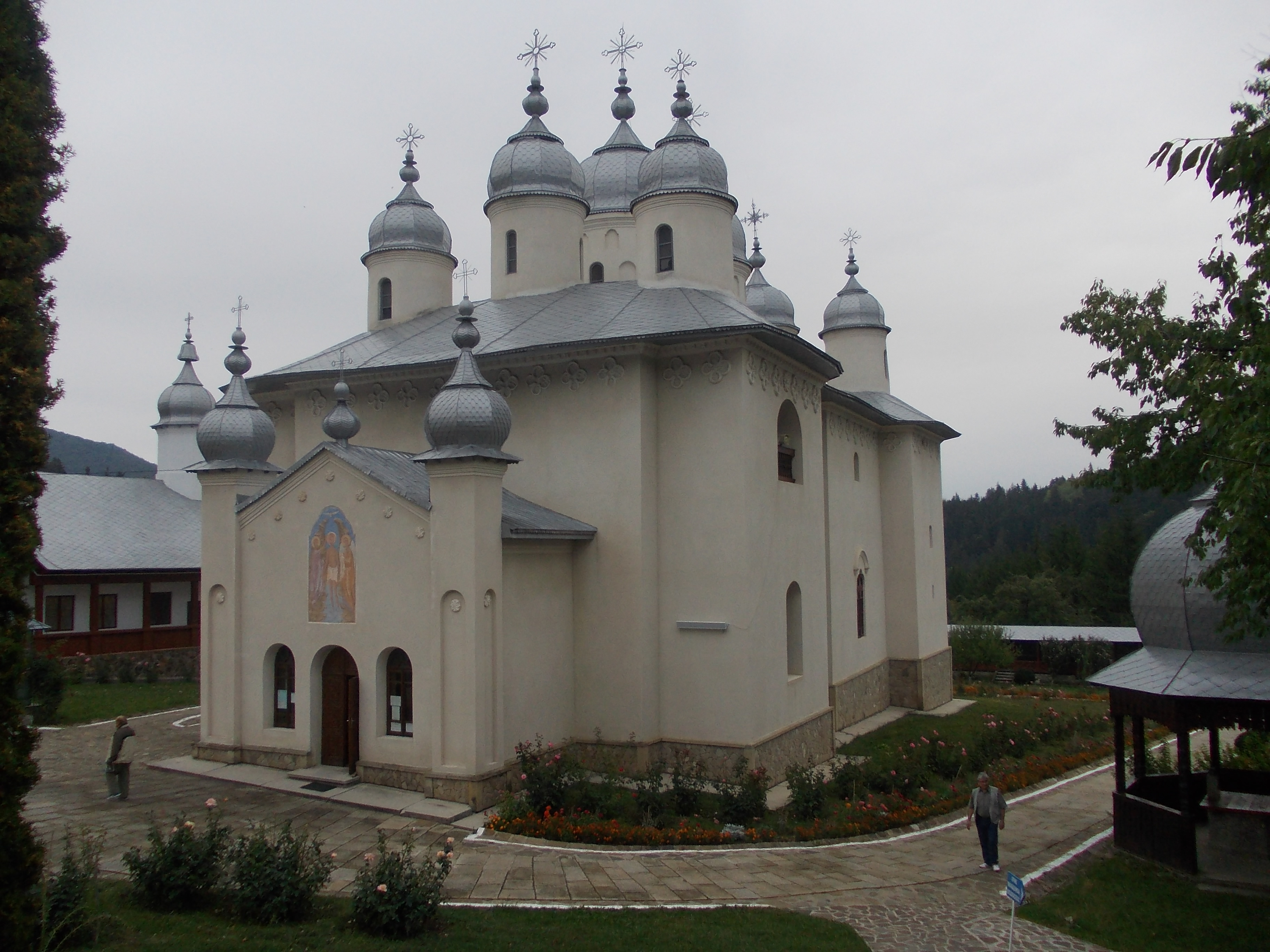
- Horaița Monastery in Crăcăoani

- Location in Neamț County

- Location in Romania
- Coordinates: 47°5′58″N 26°18′18″E
- Country: Romania
- County: Neamț

Government
  - Mayor (2024–2028): Alexandrina Raclariu (PNL)
- Area: 90 km^{2} (35 sq mi)
- Elevation: 518 m (1,699 ft)
- Population (2021-12-01): 3,670
  - Density: 41/km^{2} (110/sq mi)
- Time zone: UTC+02:00 (EET)
  - Summer (DST): UTC+03:00 (EEST)
- Postal code: 617145
- Area code: +(40) 233
- Vehicle reg.: NT
- Website: www.comunacracaoani.ro

Crăcăoani is a commune in Neamț County, Western Moldavia, Romania. It is composed of five villages: Cracăul Negru, Crăcăoani, Magazia, Mitocu Bălan, and Poiana Crăcăoani. To the east lies Ghindăoani and to the north lies Bălțătești. The name is derived from the name of the river Cracău that runs through the village.

== Culture ==
A traditional Moldavian folk music dance, performed with a fiddle and folk lute, is often performed in Crăcăoani.

Historical population
Year	Pop.	±%
2002	4,542	—
2011	3,944	−13.2%
2021	3,670	−6.9%
Source: Census data

== Natives ==
- Gheorghe Răscănescu (1900 – 1967), officer during World War II
