= Neamț County =

County of Romania

Neamț County Județul Neamț
- County
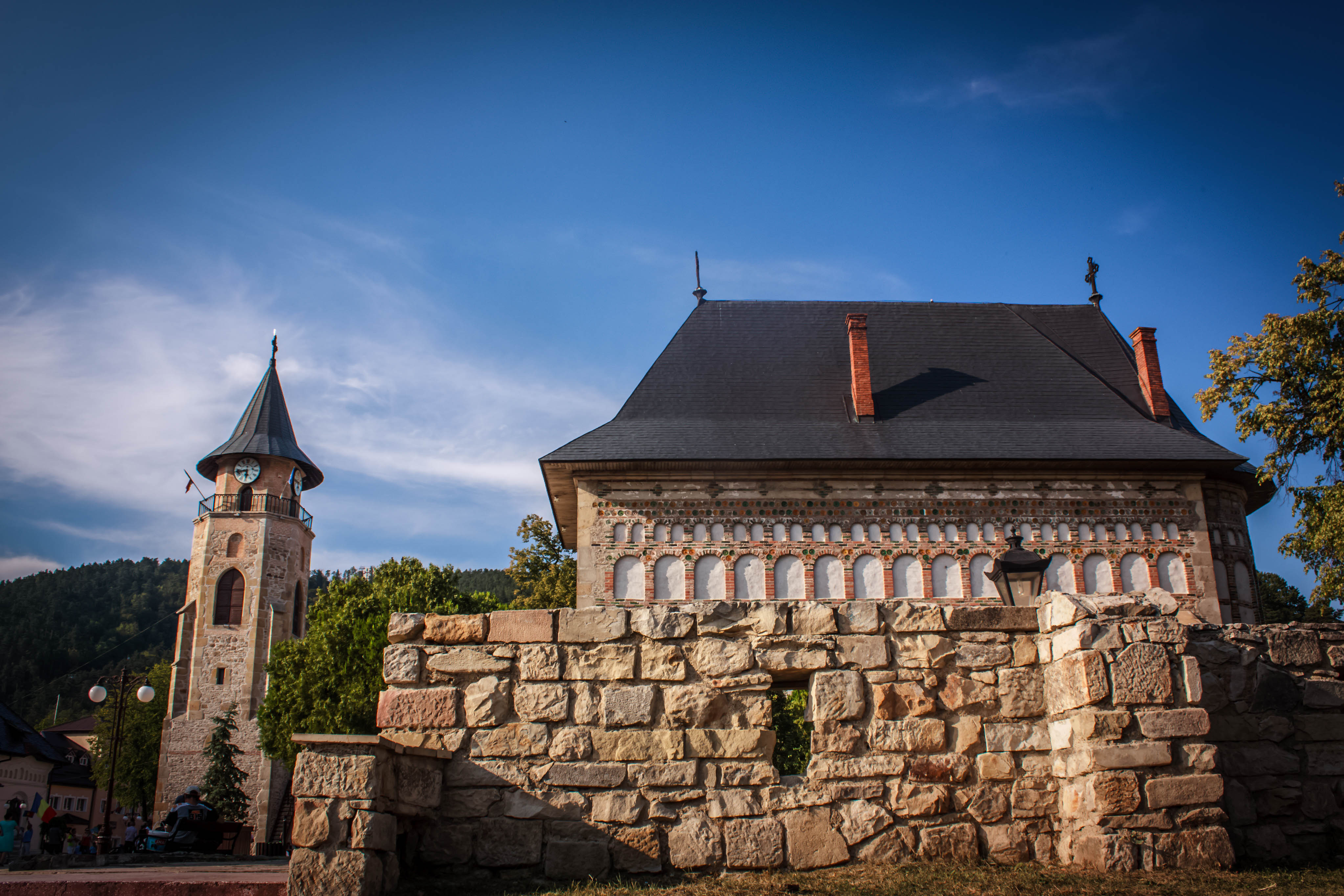
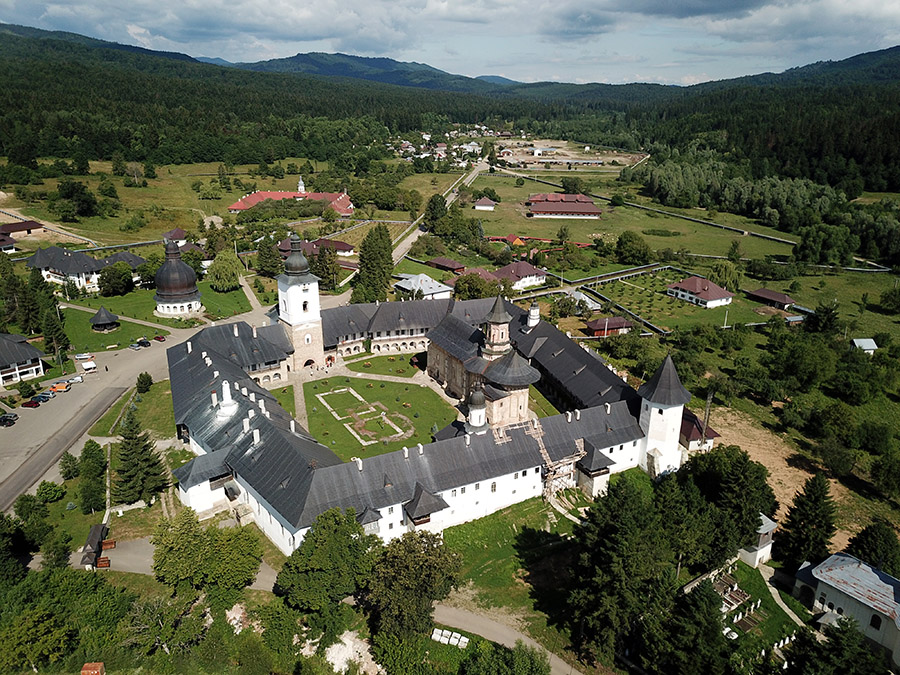
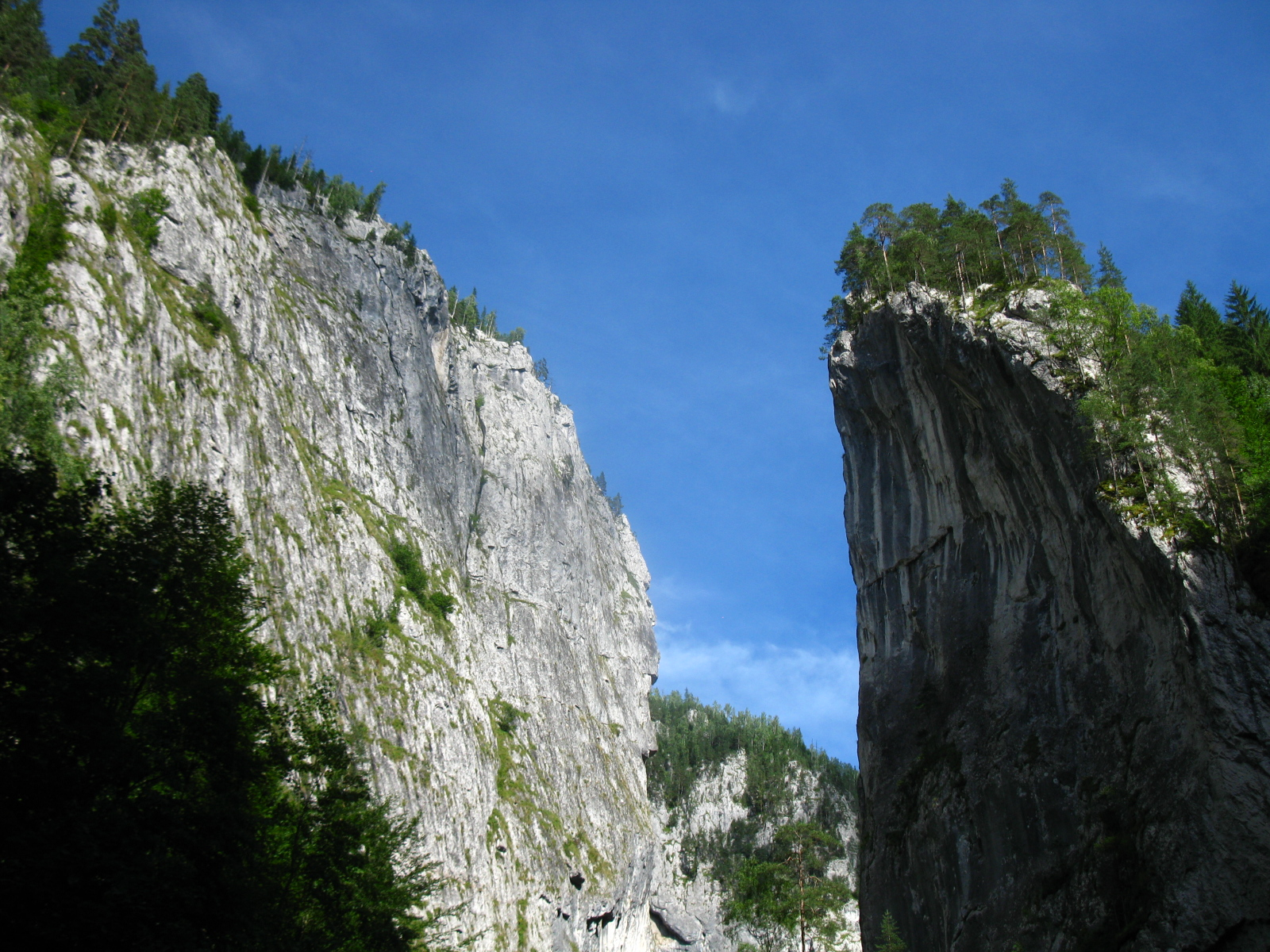
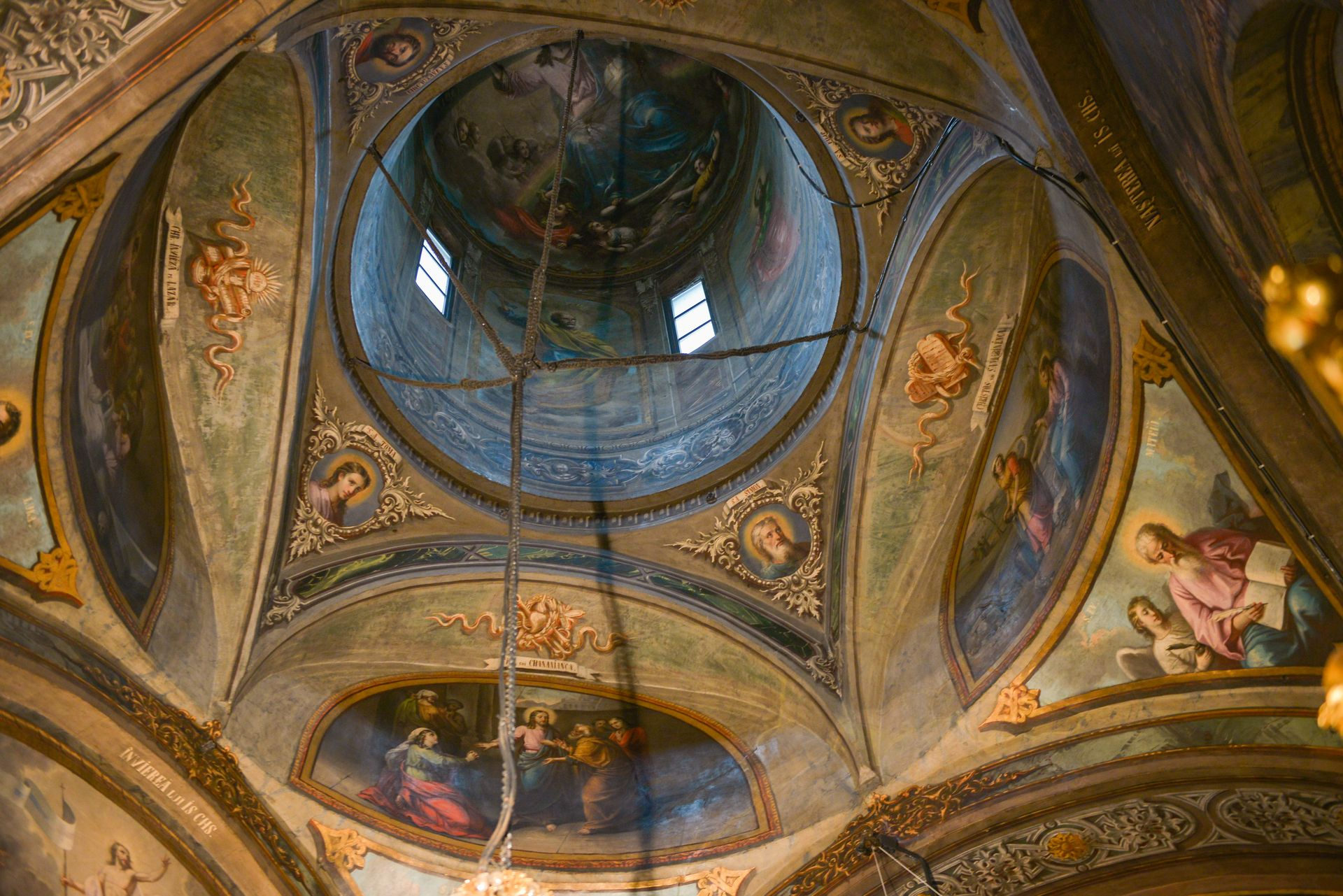
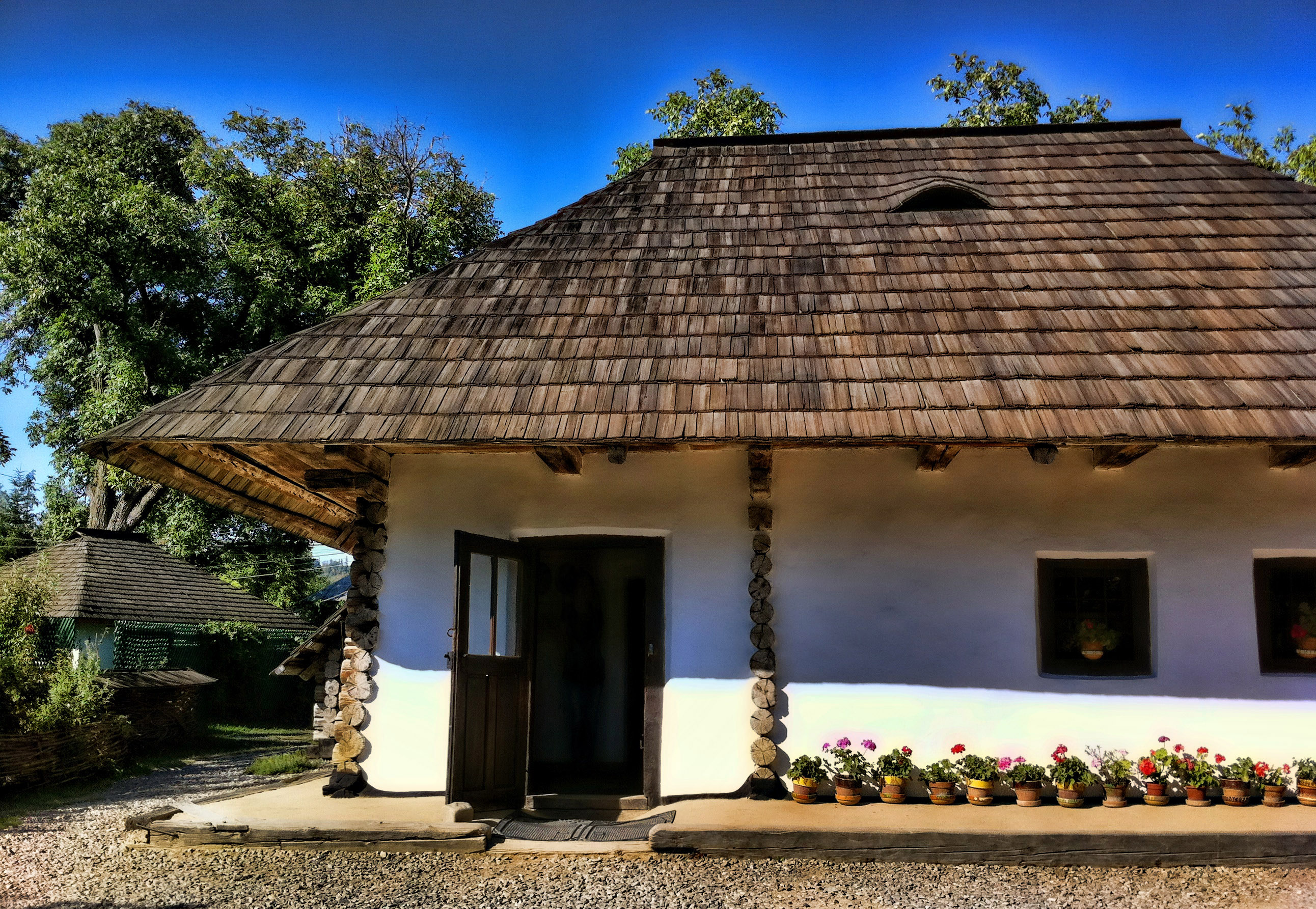
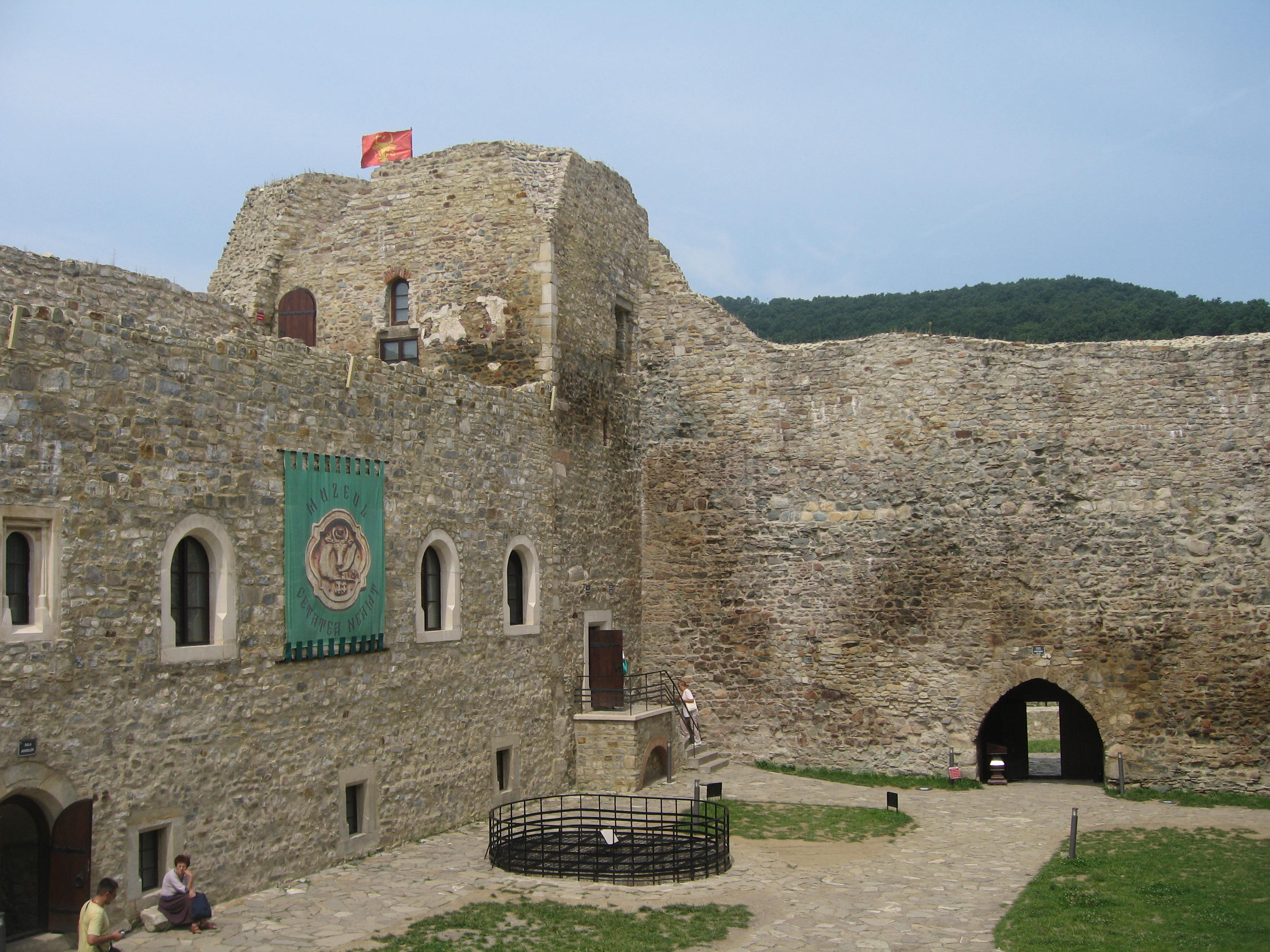
- Piatra Neamț Neamț Monastery Bicaz Gorge Agapia Monastery Ion Creangă House Neamț Citadel

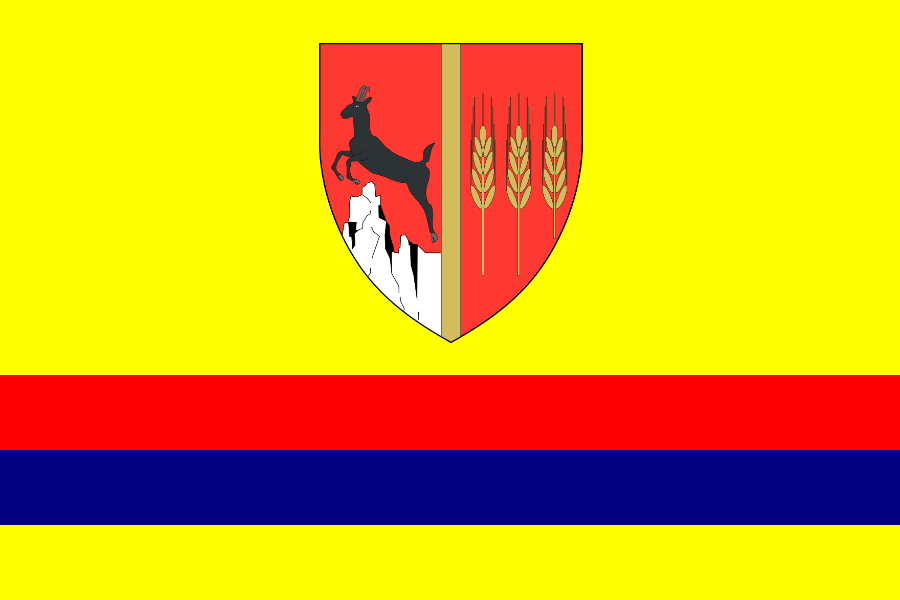
- Flag Coat of arms

- Coordinates: 46.97°N 26.4°E
- Country: Romania
- Development region: Nord-Est
- Historical region: Western Moldavia
- Capital: Piatra Neamț

Government
  - President of the County Council: Vasilică-Daniel Harpa (PSD)
  - Prefect: Adrian Bourceanu

Area
  - Total: 5,897 km^{2} (2,277 sq mi)
  - Rank: 18th

Population (2021-12-01)
  - Total: 454,203
  - Rank: 17th
  - Density: 77.02/km^{2} (199.5/sq mi)
- Telephone code: (+40) 233 or (+40) 333
- ISO 3166 code: RO-NT
- GDP (nominal): US$ 2.430 billion (2015)
- GDP per capita: US$ 5,161 (2015)
- Website: County Council; Prefecture

Neamț County (Romanian pronunciation: [ne̯amt͡s]) is a county (județ) of Romania, in the historic region of Western Moldavia, with the county seat at Piatra Neamț. The county takes its name from the Neamț River.

== Demographics ==
=== Population ===
In 2011, it had a population of 470,766 and a population density of 80/km^{2}.

- Romanians - 98.25%
- Lipovans - 0.05%
- Hungarians (more specifically Csángós) - 0.04%
- Roma - 1.48%, and others

Year	County population
1948	357,348
1956	419,949 ▲
1966	470,206 ▲
1977	532,096 ▲
1992	577,619 ▲
2002	554,516 ▼
2011	470,766 ▼
2021	454,203 ▼

=== Religion ===
Religion in Neamț County (2011)
Eastern Orthodox	83.2%
Catholic	9.6%
Unknown	5.0%
Other faiths (e.g. Seventh-day Adventists, Pentecostalism, Islam)	2.2%

== Geography ==
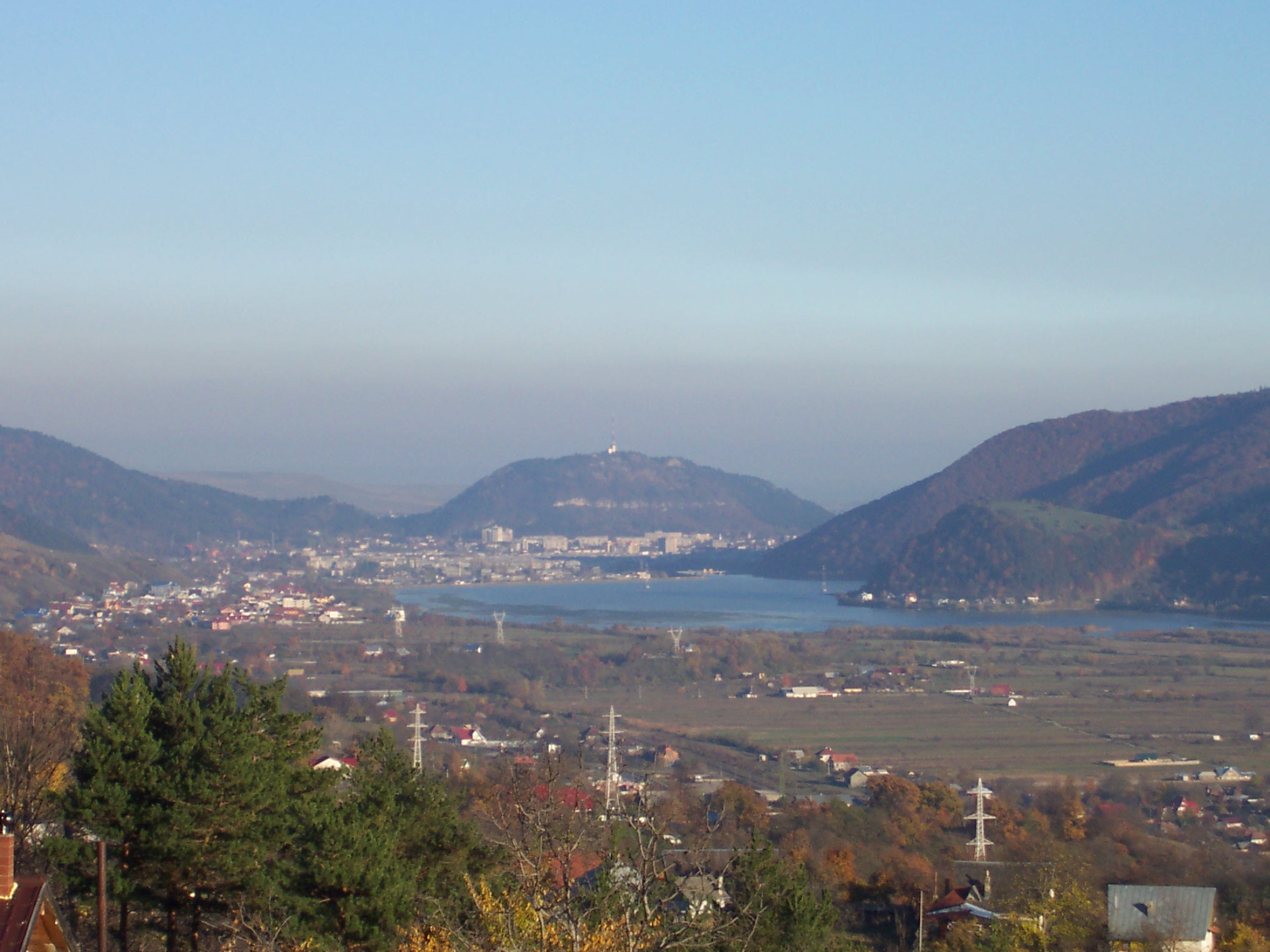
Bistrița Valley

Neamț County has an area of 5,897 km^{2} (2,277 sq mi).

The relief decreases from west to east. In the western part, there are mountains, the Eastern Carpathians, with heights of over 1,800 m (5,900 ft) and the impressive peak of Ceahlău Massif. Along the Bicaz River lies the canyon of Cheile Bicazului. Construction of the Bicaz Dam in the 1950s on the Bistrița River led to the formation of Lake Bicaz (Lake Izvorul Muntelui), the largest artificial lake completely in Romania.

On the western side, the lowest point, at about 160 m (520 ft), is found along the Siret River's valley.

=== Neighbours ===
- Iași County and Vaslui County in the East.
- Harghita County in the West.
- Suceava County in the North.
- Bacău County in the South.

== Economy ==
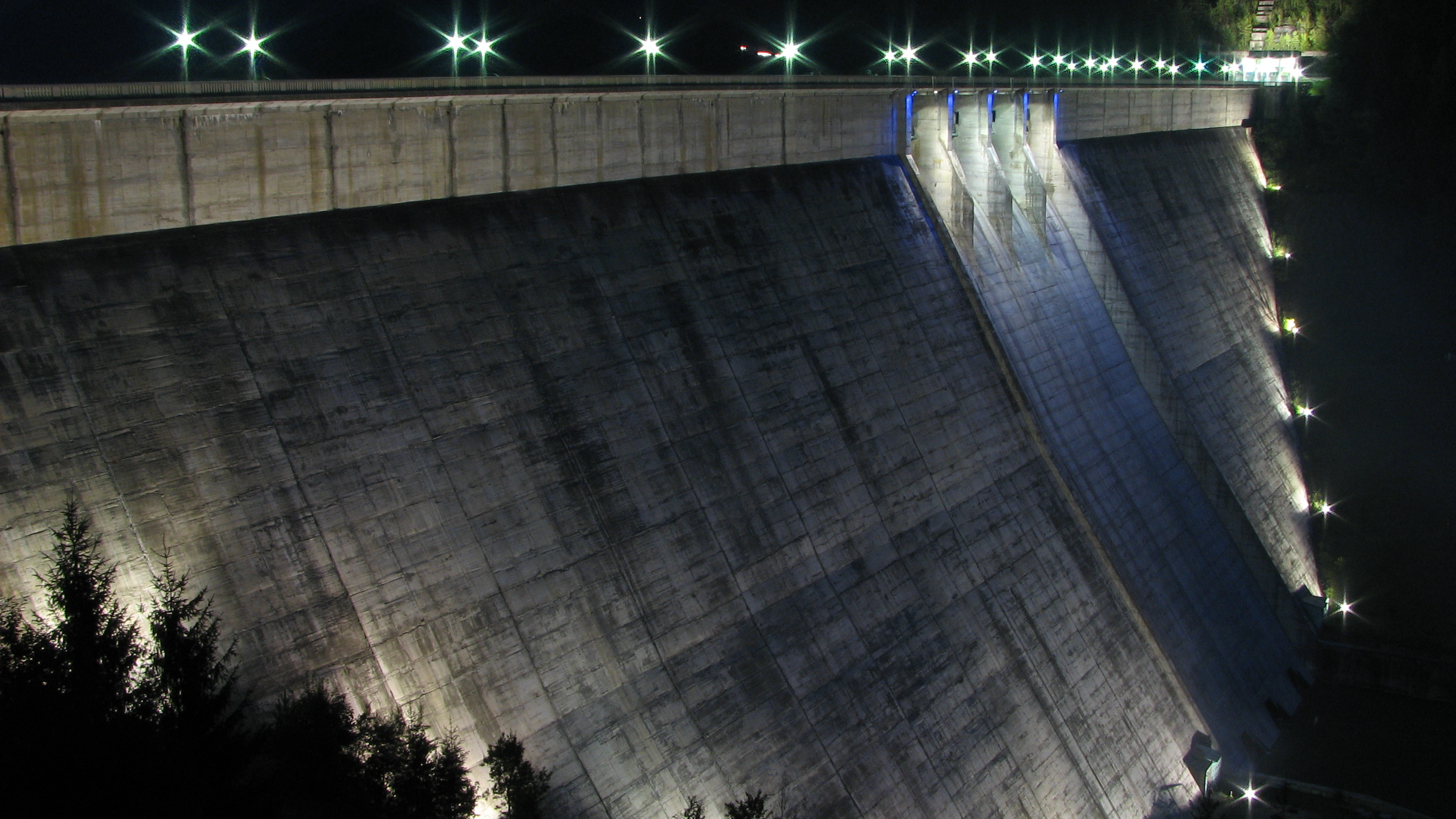
The Bicaz Dam

The county's main industries are

- Chemical industry
- Mechanical parts
- Textiles
- Food stuffs
- Construction materials

One of the greatest dams in Romania, the Bicaz Dam is built along the Bistrița River, forming the Bicaz Lake; the water of the lake is used for electricity production at Bicaz-Stejaru Hydroelectric Power Station.

== History ==
In 2025 researchers using LiDAR in the forests of Neamț County discovered a 5,000-year-old fortification which roughly dates back to the transition from the Neolithic period to the Bronze Age.

== Tourism ==
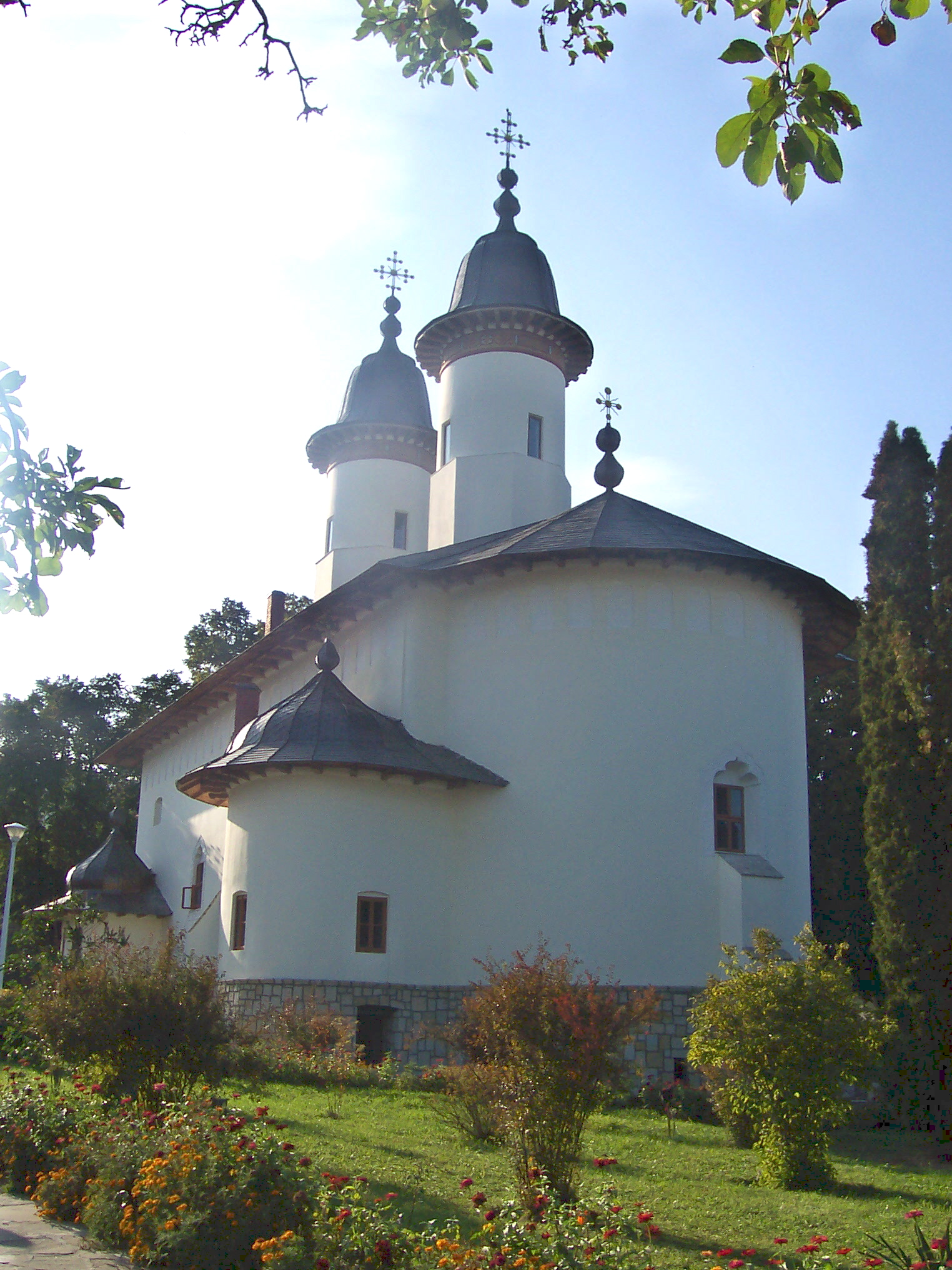
The church of Văratec Monastery

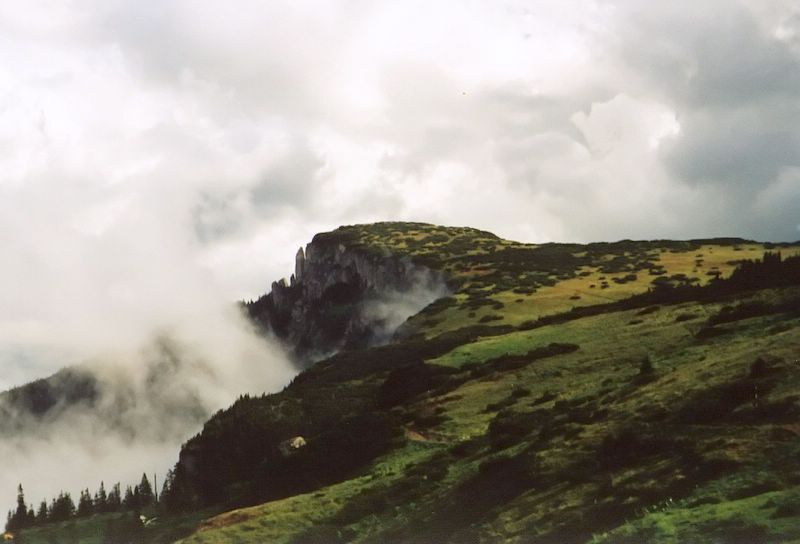
Ceahlău Massif

Neamț County is known as the region with the most monasteries to be found per square kilometer in the world. The monumental church of Neamț Monastery has been a model for Moldavian churches and monasteries. The Moldavian art style, of great originality and stylistic unity, was developed by blending Gothic elements with Byzantine motifs.

The county is host to two of Romania's 9 national parks: the Ceahlău Massif and the Vânători-Neamț Natural Park.

The county's main tourist attractions include

- The city of Piatra Neamț, with its medieval square and ski facilities;
- The city of Roman
  - Agapia Monastery
  - Bistrița Monastery
  - Durău Monastery
  - Horaița Monastery
  - Neamț Monastery
  - Pângărați Monastery
  - Petru Vodă Monastery
  - Războieni Monastery
  - Secu Monastery
  - Sihăstria Monastery
  - Sihla Monastery
  - Văratec Monastery
- Vânători-Neamț Natural Park
- Neamț Citadel in Târgu Neamț
- Ceahlău National Park
- Bicaz Canyon - "Cheile Bicazului"
- Durău Ski Resort
- Hanu Ancuței

== Politics ==
The Neamț County Council, renewed at the 2024 local elections, consists of 34 councilors, with the following party composition:

Party	Seats	Current County Council
Social Democratic Party (PSD)	16	
National Liberal Party (PNL)	14	
Alliance for the Union of Romanians (AUR)	4	

== Administrative divisions ==
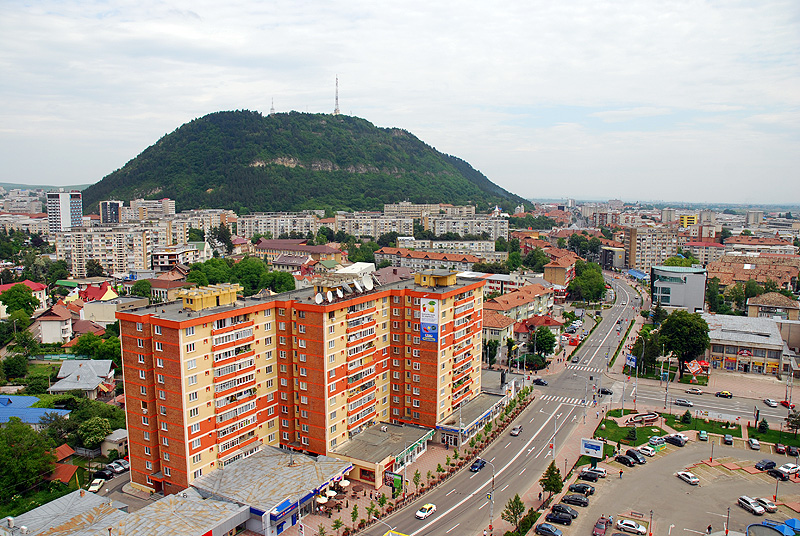
Piatra Neamț (German: Kreuzburg an der Bistritz)

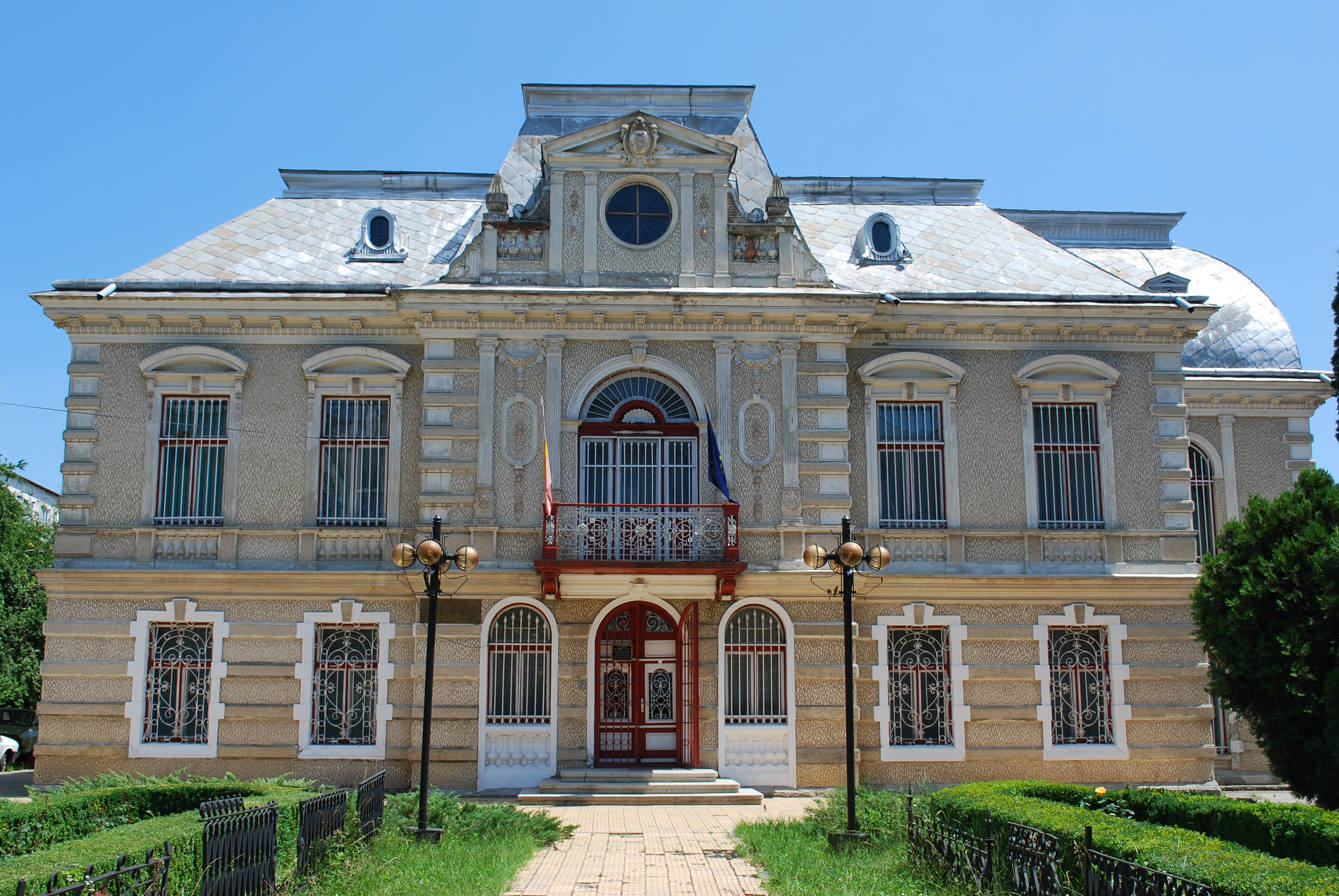
The History Museum in Roman

Neamț County has 2 municipalities, 3 towns and 78 communes.

- Municipalities
  - Piatra Neamț - capital city; population: 77,393 (as of 2011 census)
  - Roman - population: 45,344 (as of 2011 census)
- Towns
  - Bicaz
  - Roznov
  - Târgu Neamț
- Communes
  - Agapia
  - Alexandru cel Bun
  - Bahna
  - Bălțătești
  - Bârgăuani
  - Bicaz-Chei
  - Bicazu Ardelean
  - Bâra
  - Bodești
  - Boghicea
  - Borca
  - Borlești
  - Botești
  - Bozieni
  - Brusturi
  - Cândești
  - Ceahlău
  - Cordun
  - Costișa
  - Crăcăoani
  - Dămuc
  - Dobreni
  - Dochia
  - Doljești
  - Dragomirești
  - Drăgănești
  - Dulcești
  - Dumbrava Roșie
  - Farcașa
  - Făurei
  - Gâdinți
  - Gârcina
  - Gherăești
  - Ghindăoani
  - Girov
  - Grințieș
  - Grumăzești
  - Hangu
  - Horia
  - Icușești
  - Ion Creangă
  - Mărgineni
  - Moldoveni
  - Negrești
  - Oniceni
  - Păstrăveni
  - Pâncești
  - Pângărați
  - Petricani
  - Piatra Șoimului
  - Pipirig
  - Podoleni
  - Poiana Teiului
  - Poienari
  - Răucești
  - Războieni
  - Rediu
  - Români
  - Ruginoasa
  - Sagna
  - Săbăoani
  - Săvinești
  - Secuieni
  - Stănița
  - Ștefan cel Mare
  - Tarcău
  - Tașca
  - Tazlău
  - Tămășeni
  - Timișești
  - Trifești
  - Tupilați
  - Țibucani
  - Urecheni
  - Valea Ursului
  - Văleni
  - Vânători-Neamț
  - Zănești

=== Natives ===
- Sergiu Celibidache, conductor
- Vasile Conta, philosopher
- Ion Creangă, writer
- Virgil Gheorghiu, writer
- Ștefan Macovei, contemporary sculptor
- Nicodim Munteanu, patriarch

== Historical county ==
Județul Neamț
- County (Județ)
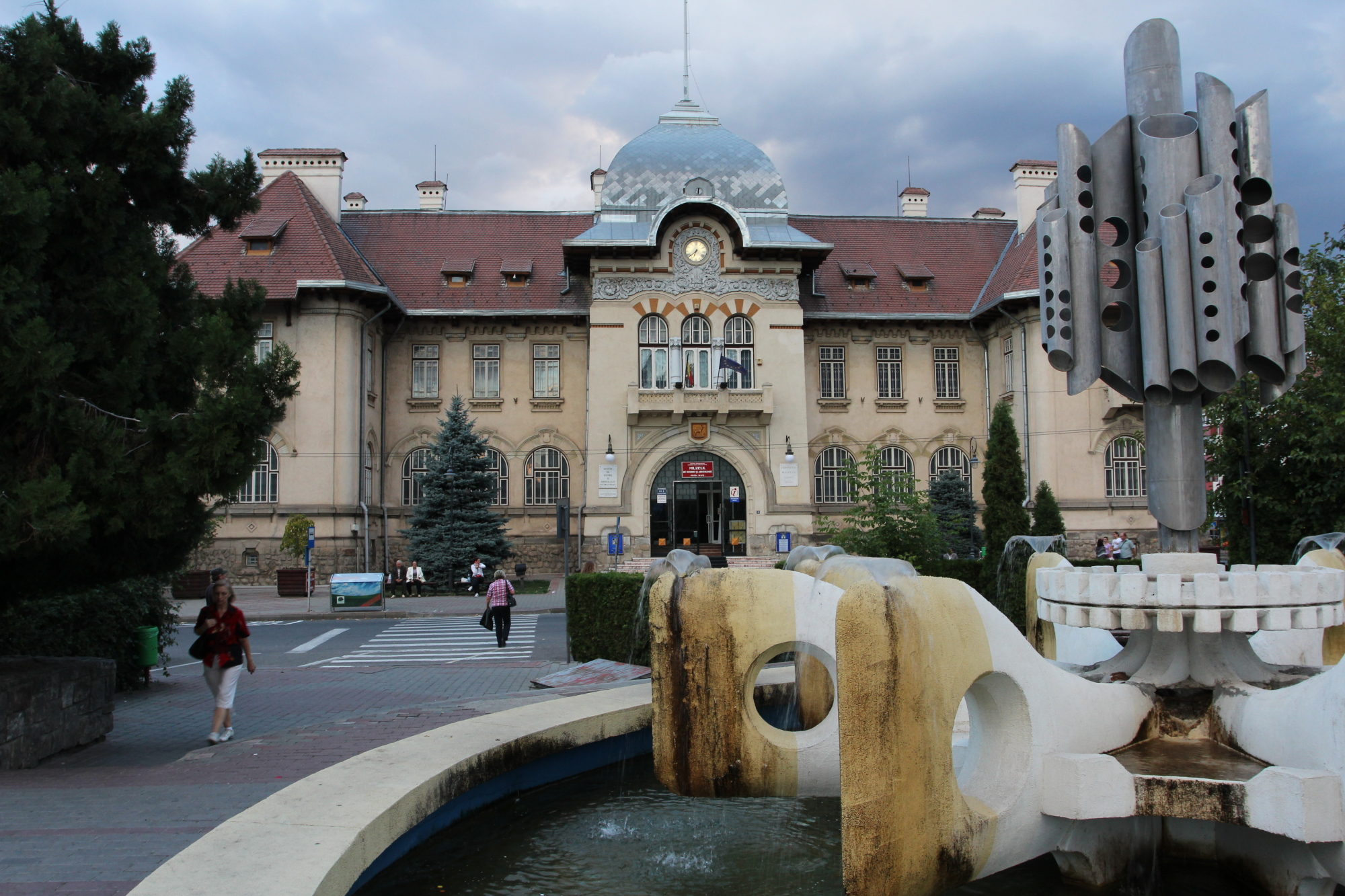
- The Neamț County Prefect's building from the interwar period, currently the county museum.

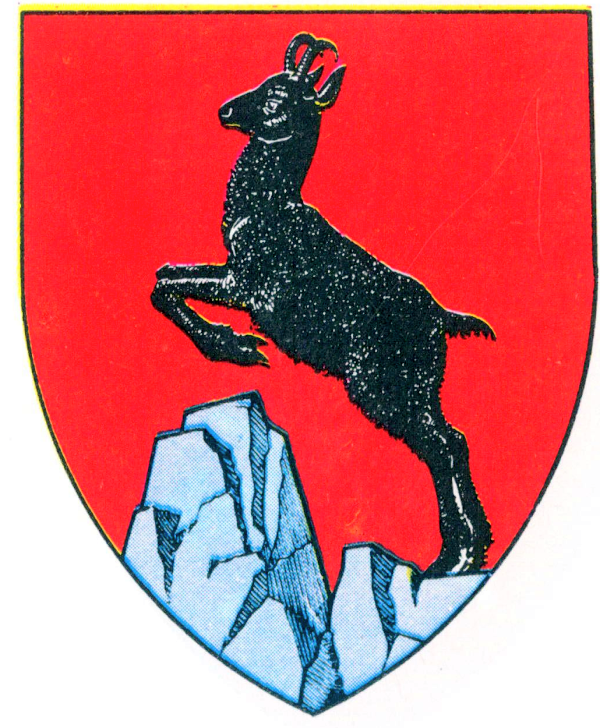
- Coat of arms

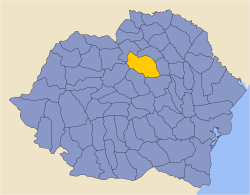
- Country: Romania
- Historic region: Western Moldavia
- Capital city (Reședință de județ): Piatra Neamț

Area
  - Total: 3,977 km^{2} (1,536 sq mi)

Population (1930)
  - Total: 198,223
  - Density: 49.84/km^{2} (129.1/sq mi)
- Time zone: UTC+2 (EET)
  - Summer (DST): UTC+3 (EEST)

The county was located in the north-eastern part of Romania, in the north-west of the region of Moldavia. Today, most of the territory of the former county is part of the current Neamț County. It was bordered on the north by Câmpulung County, to the north-east by Baia County, to the east by Roman County, to the south by Bacău County, to the southwest by Ciuc County, and to the west by Mureș County.

=== Administration ===
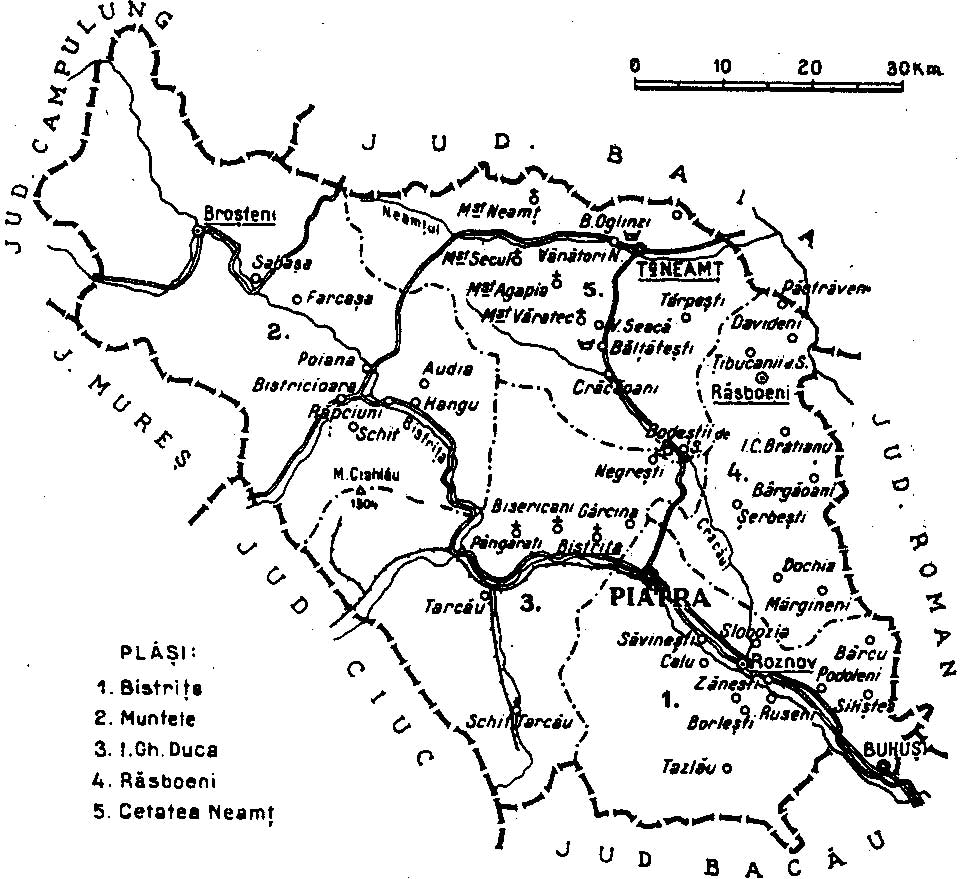
Map of Neamț County as constituted in 1938.

In 1930, the county had four districts (plăși):

1. Plasa Bistrița
2. Plasa De Mijloc
3. Plasa Muntele
4. Plasa Neamț

In 1938, the county had five districts:

1. Plasa Bistrița, with 45 villages and headquartered in Roznov
2. Plasa Muntele, with 53 villages and headquartered in Broșteni
3. Plasa I.Gh. Duca, with 39 villages
4. Plasa Răsboeni, with 56 villages and headquartered in Răsboeni
5. Plasa Cetatea Neamț, with 15 villages and headquartered in Târgu Neamț

Apart from Piatra Neamț, the county had two urban municipalities (cities): Târgu Neamț and Buhuși.

=== Population ===
According to the 1930 census data, the county population was 198,223 inhabitants, 90.3% Romanians, 6.3% Jews, 1.2% Hungarians, as well as other minorities. From the religious point of view, the population was 90.5% Eastern Orthodox, 6.7% Jewish, 2.3% Roman Catholic, as well as other minorities.

==== Urban population ====
In 1930, the county's urban population was 47,957 inhabitants, comprising 69.6% Romanians, 24.7% Jews, 1.3% Hungarians, as well as other minorities. From the religious point of view, the urban population was composed of 69.7% Eastern Orthodox, 25.2% Jewish, 3.4% Roman Catholic, as well as other minorities.
