= Păstrăveni =

- Commune
- Location in Neamț County

- Location in Romania
- Coordinates: 47°10′N 26°34′E
- Country: Romania
- County: Neamț

Government
  - Mayor (2020–2024): Anton-Nicolai Gorea (PSD)
- Area: 37.36 km^{2} (14.42 sq mi)
- Elevation: 274 m (899 ft)
- Population (2021-12-01): 3,709
  - Density: 99.28/km^{2} (257.1/sq mi)
- Time zone: UTC+02:00 (EET)
  - Summer (DST): UTC+03:00 (EEST)
- Postal code: 617300
- Area code: +(40) 233
- Vehicle reg.: NT
- Website: www.pastraveni.ro

Păstrăveni is a commune in Neamț County, Western Moldavia, Romania. It is composed of four villages: Lunca Moldovei, Păstrăveni, Rădeni, and Spiești.

The commune is situated on the Moldavian Plateau, at an altitude of 274 m (899 ft), on the banks of the river Topolița. It is located in the northeastern part of Neamț County, 25 km (16 mi) southeast of Târgu Neamț and 45 km (28 mi) northeast of the county seat, Piatra Neamț, on the border with Iași County, and neighbors the following communes: Urecheni to the north, Țibucani to the south, Miroslovești to the east, and Petricani to the west.

Historical population
Year	Pop.	±%
2002	3,836	—
2011	3,595	−6.3%
2021	3,709	+3.2%
Source: Census data
