= Valea Mare (Netezi) =

- Location within Romania

Location
- Country: Romania
- Counties: Neamț County

Physical characteristics
- Mouth: Netezi
  - coordinates: 47.1476°N 26.4030°E
- Length: 10 km (6.2 mi)
- Basin size: 40 km^{2} (15 sq mi)

Basin features
- Progression: Netezi→ Topolița→ Moldova→ Siret→ Danube→ Black Sea
- Tributaries
  - left: Temnic

The Valea Mare is a right tributary of the river Netezi in Romania. It flows into the Netezi in Grumăzești. Its length is 10 km (6.2 mi) and its basin size is 40 km^{2} (15 sq mi).
