= Rusi =

Rusi or RUSI may refer to:

== Places in Romania ==
- Ruși River, Romania
- Ruși, a district in the town of Zlatna, Alba County
- Ruși, a village in Bretea Română, Hunedoara County
- Ruși, a village in Slimnic, Sibiu County
- Ruși, a village in Forăști, Suceava County
- Ruși, a village in Puiești, Vaslui

== People ==
- Alpo Rusi (born 1949), Finnish diplomat
- Jukka Rusi (1935–2004), Finnish journalist and spy
- Lin Rusi, better known as Adet Lin (1923–1971), Chinese-American novelist and translator

== Other uses ==
- Royal United Services Institute, a British defence and security think tank
- Republic of the United States of Indonesia, a former federal state
- Rusi (film), a 1984 Tamil-language Indian feature film

== See also ==
- Ruși-Ciutea, a village in Letea Veche Commune, Bacău County, Romania
- Rușii-Munți, a commune in Mureș County, Romania
