= Moisea =

- Location within Romania

Location
- Country: Romania
- Counties: Suceava County

Physical characteristics
- Mouth: Seaca
  - location: Moișa
  - coordinates: 47.3305°N 26.2999°E
- Length: 10 km (6.2 mi)
- Basin size: 13 km^{2} (5.0 sq mi)

Basin features
- Progression: Seaca→ Moldova→ Siret→ Danube→ Black Sea

The Moisea is a left tributary of the river Seaca in Romania. It flows into the Seaca in the village Moișa. Its length is 10 km (6.2 mi) and its basin size is 13 km^{2} (5.0 sq mi).
