= Topolița =

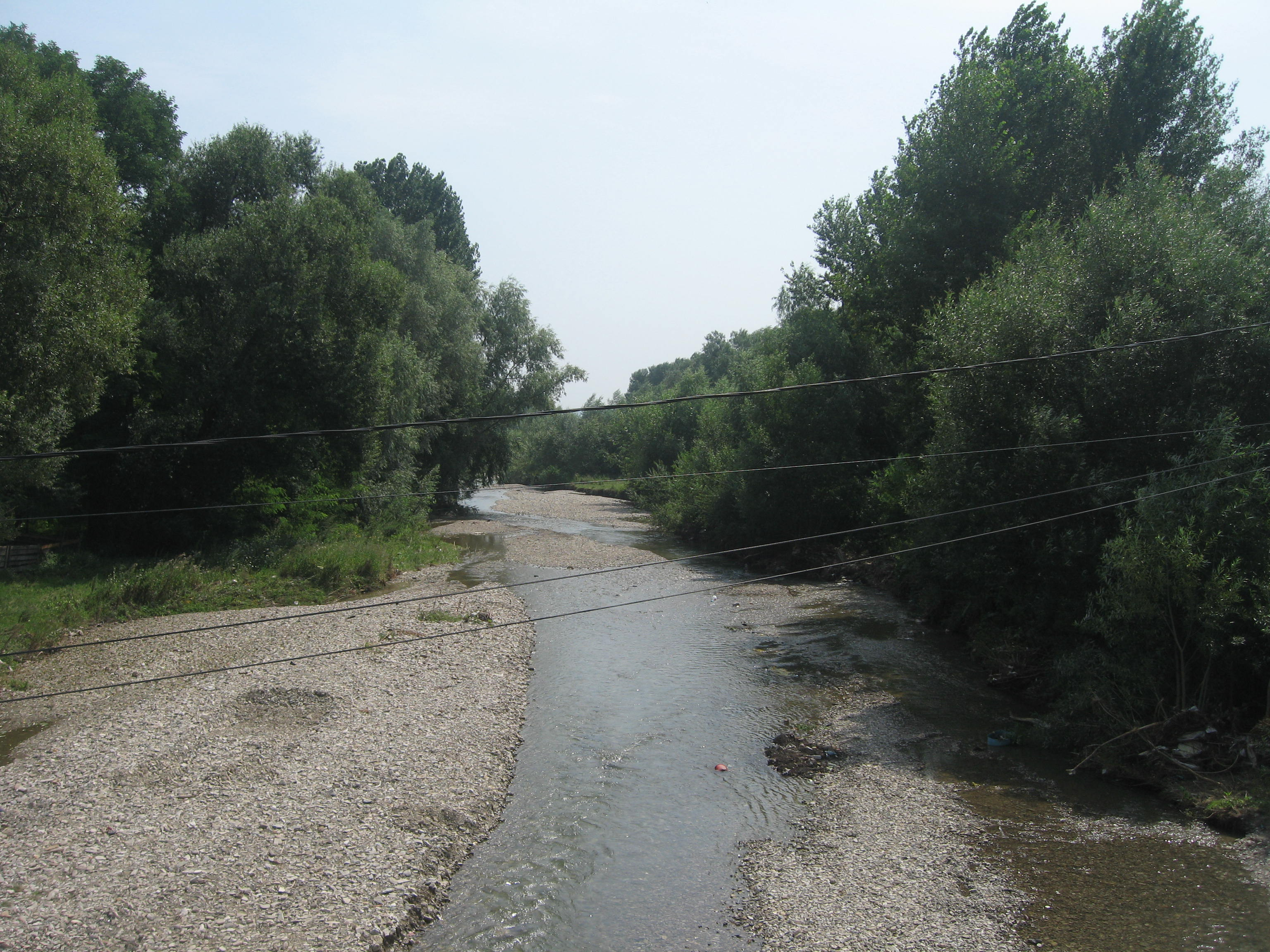

- Location within Romania

Location
- Country: Romania
- Counties: Neamț County
- Villages: Topolița, Petricani, Urecheni, Păstrăveni

Physical characteristics
- Mouth: Moldova
  - location: Miroslovești
  - coordinates: 47.1399°N 26.6228°E
- Length: 36 km (22 mi)
- Basin size: 268 km^{2} (103 sq mi)

Basin features
- Progression: Moldova→ Siret→ Danube→ Black Sea
- Tributaries
  - left: Agapia, Valea Seacă
  - right: Netezi, Țolici, Rădeanca

The Topolița (also: Toplița) is a right tributary of the river Moldova in Romania. It discharges into the Moldova in Spiești. Its length is 36 km (22 mi) and its basin size is 268 km^{2} (103 sq mi).
