= Netezi =

- Location within Romania

Location
- Country: Romania
- Counties: Neamț County
- Villages: Bălțătești, Netezi

Physical characteristics
- Mouth: Topolița
  - coordinates: 47.1541°N 26.4148°E
- Length: 15 km (9.3 mi)
- Basin size: 81 km^{2} (31 sq mi)

Basin features
- Progression: Topolița→ Moldova→ Siret→ Danube→ Black Sea
- Tributaries
  - right: Pârâul Sărat, Valea Mare

The Netezi is a right tributary of the river Topolița in Romania. It flows into the Topolița near Grumăzești. Its length is 15 km (9.3 mi) and its basin size is 81 km^{2} (31 sq mi).
