= Șomuz =

- Location within Romania

Location
- Country: Romania
- Counties: Suceava County
- Villages: Lucăcești, Cornu Luncii, Baia, Fântâna Mare, Vadu Moldovei

Physical characteristics
- Mouth: Moldova
  - coordinates: 47.3448°N 26.4077°E
- Length: 32 km (20 mi)
- Basin size: 101 km^{2} (39 sq mi)

Basin features
- Progression: Moldova→ Siret→ Danube→ Black Sea
- Tributaries
  - left: Șomuzul Mic

The Șomuz is a left tributary of the river Moldova in Romania. It flows into the Moldova near Roșiori. Its length is 32 km (20 mi) and its basin size is 101 km^{2} (39 sq mi). For much of its length it flows parallel to the north of the Moldova.
