= Valea Seacă (Topolița) =

- Location within Romania

Location
- Country: Romania
- Counties: Neamț County

Physical characteristics
- Mouth: Topolița
  - coordinates: 47.1713°N 26.3789°E
- Length: 12 km (7.5 mi)
- Basin size: 11 km^{2} (4.2 sq mi)

Basin features
- Progression: Topolița→ Moldova→ Siret→ Danube→ Black Sea

The Valea Seacă is a left tributary of the river Topolița in Romania. It flows into the Topolița in the village Topolița. Its length is 12 km (7.5 mi) and its basin size is 11 km^{2} (4.2 sq mi).
