= Țolici =

River in Romania

- Location within Romania

Location
- Country: Romania
- Counties: Neamț County
- Villages: Țolici

Physical characteristics
- Mouth: Topolița
  - location: Târpești
  - coordinates: 47.1560°N 26.4422°E
- Length: 13 km (8.1 mi)
- Basin size: 45 km^{2} (17 sq mi)

Basin features
- Progression: Topolița→ Moldova→ Siret→ Danube→ Black Sea

The Țolici is a right tributary of the river Topolița in Romania. It flows into the Topolița in Târpești. Its length is 13 km (8.1 mi) and its basin size is 45 km^{2} (17 sq mi).
