= Agapia (river) =

River in Neamț, Romania

- Location within Romania

Location
- Country: Romania
- Counties: Neamț County
- Villages: Agapia

Physical characteristics
- Mouth: Topolița
  - coordinates: 47.1655°N 26.3204°E
- Length: 14 km (8.7 mi)
- Basin size: 34 km^{2} (13 sq mi)

Basin features
- Progression: Topolița→ Moldova→ Siret→ Danube→ Black Sea

The Agapia is a left tributary of the river Topolița in Romania. It flows into the Topolița near Săcălușești. Its length is 14 km (8.7 mi) and its basin size is 34 km^{2} (13 sq mi).
