= Pârâul Frumos =

Pârâul Frumos may refer to the following rivers in Romania:

- Pârâul Frumos (Olt), tributary of the Olt River
- Pârâul Frumos (Putna), tributary of the Putna River
