= Giulești (disambiguation) =

Giulești may refer to several places in Romania:

- Giulești, a neighborhood of Bucharest
- Giulești, a commune in Maramureș County
- Giulești, a village in Pietroasa Commune, Bihor County
- Giulești, a village in Secuieni Commune, Neamț County
- Giulești, a village in Boroaia Commune, Suceava County
- Giulești and Giuleștii de Sus, villages in Fârtățești Commune, Vâlcea County
