= Seaca (Moldova) =

- Location within Romania

Location
- Country: Romania
- Counties: Suceava County
- Villages: Săcuța, Moișa, Boroaia

Physical characteristics
- Mouth: Moldova
  - coordinates: 47.3578°N 26.3720°E
- Length: 14 km (8.7 mi)
- Basin size: 33 km^{2} (13 sq mi)

Basin features
- Progression: Moldova→ Siret→ Danube→ Black Sea
- Tributaries
  - left: Moisea

The Seaca is a right tributary of the river Moldova in Romania. It flows into the Moldova near Giulești. Its length is 14 km (8.7 mi) and its basin size is 33 km^{2} (13 sq mi).
