= Cordun =

- Commune
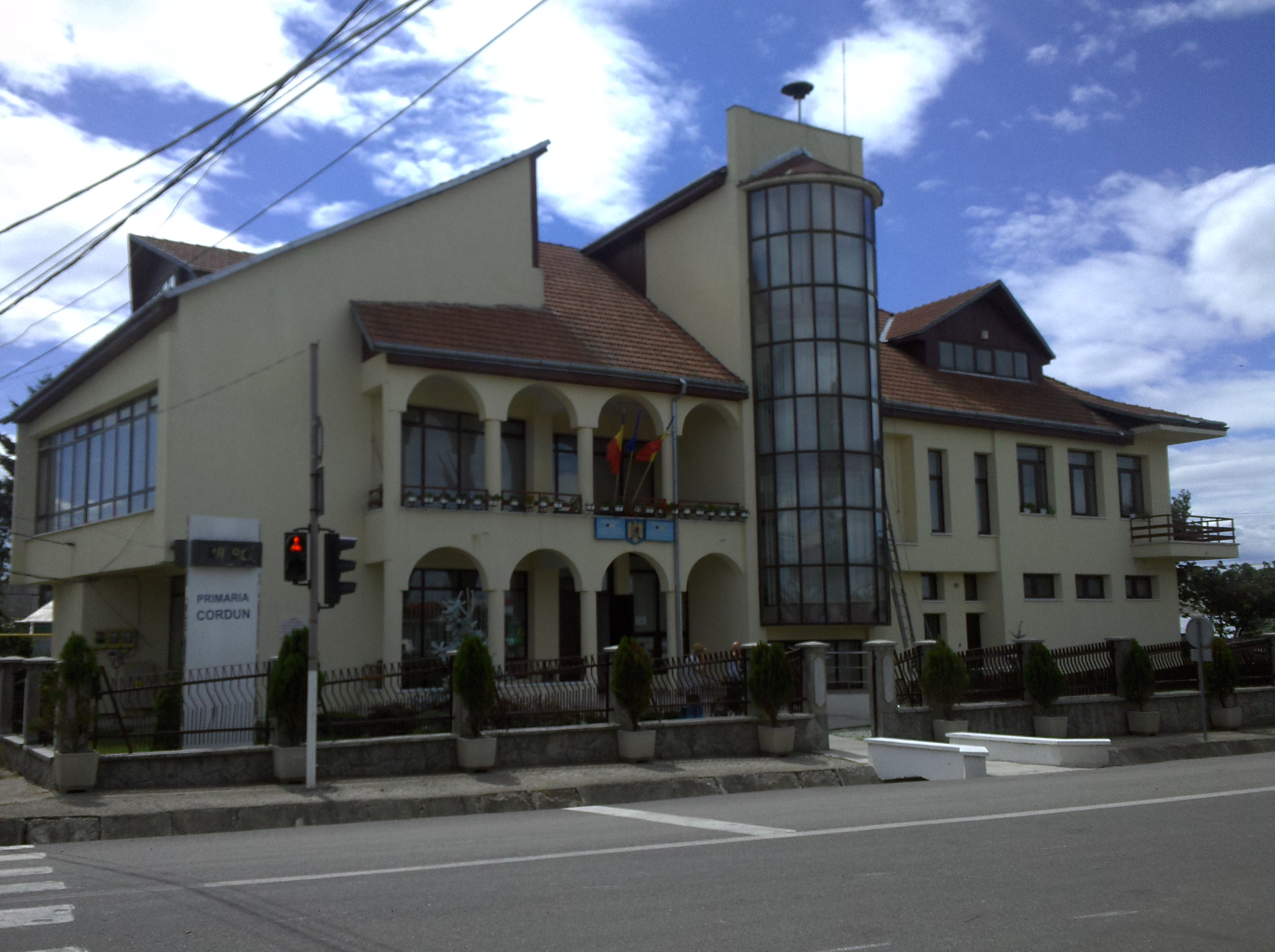
- Cordun town hall

- Location in Neamț County

- Location in Romania
- Coordinates: 46°57′N 26°54′E
- Country: Romania
- County: Neamț

Government
  - Mayor (2020–2024): Adrian Ciobanu (PNL)
- Area: 42.24 km^{2} (16.31 sq mi)
- Elevation: 203 m (666 ft)
- Population (2021-12-01): 6,842
  - Density: 162.0/km^{2} (419.5/sq mi)
- Time zone: UTC+02:00 (EET)
  - Summer (DST): UTC+03:00 (EEST)
- Postal code: 617135
- Area code: +(40) 233
- Vehicle reg.: NT
- Website: www.primariacordun.ro

Cordun is a commune in Neamț County, Western Moldavia, Romania. It is composed of three villages: Cordun, Pildești, and Simionești.

The commune is situated on the Moldavian Plateau, at an altitude of 203 m (666 ft), on the banks of the Moldova River and its left tributary, the Ciurlac. It is located in the eastern part of Neamț County, 4 km (2.5 mi) northwest of Roman and 52 km (32 mi) east of the county seat, Piatra Neamț. Cordun is crossed by county road DJ207B, which connects Roman to Săbăoani, where it ends in DN2.

Historical population
Year	Pop.	±%
1992	6,869	—
2002	7,174	+4.4%
2011	6,333	−11.7%
2021	6,842	+8.0%
Source: Census data

In 2002, the commune had a population of 7,174, of whom all but seven were ethnic Romanians; 52.8% of residents were Roman Catholic and 46.6% Romanian Orthodox. At the 2011 census, Cordun had a population of 6,333, and at the 2021 census it had a population of 6,842.
