= Găinești =

Găineşti may refer to several villages in Romania:

- Găineşti, a village in Slatina Commune, Suceava County
- Găineşti, a village in Făurești Commune, Vâlcea County
