= Suha Mică =

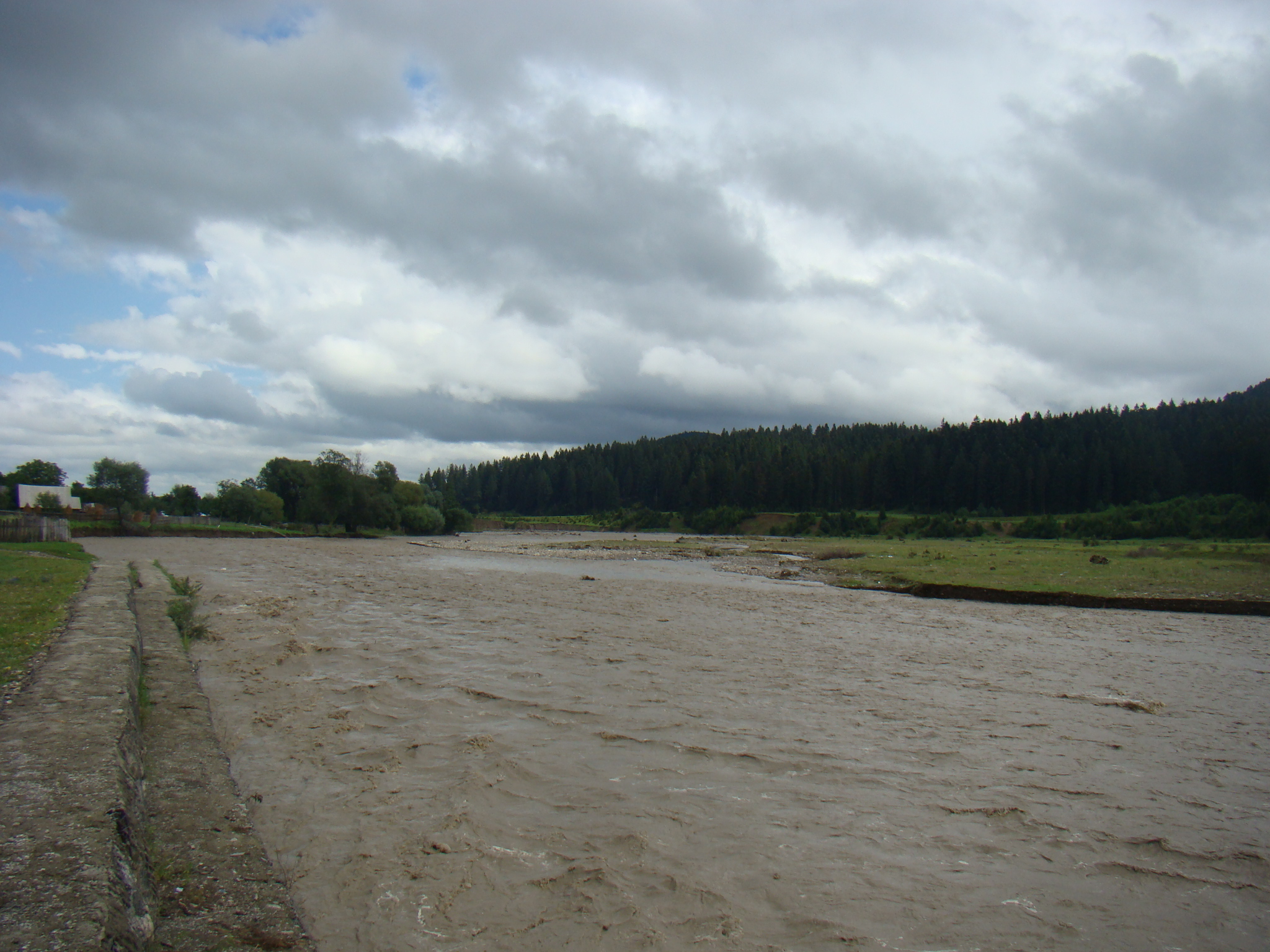

- Location within Romania

Location
- Country: Romania
- Counties: Suceava County
- Villages: Găinești, Slatina

Physical characteristics
- Source: Stânișoara Mountains
- Mouth: Moldova
  - location: Mălini
  - coordinates: 47.4822°N 26.0862°E
- Length: 26 km (16 mi)
- Basin size: 125 km^{2} (48 sq mi)

Basin features
- Progression: Moldova→ Siret→ Danube→ Black Sea

The Suha Mică is a right tributary of the river Moldova in Romania. It discharges into the Moldova near Mălini. Its length is 26 km (16 mi) and its basin size is about 125 km^{2} (48 sq mi).
