= Iezeru =

Iezeru may refer to several places in Romania:

- Iezeru, a village in Jegălia Commune, Călărași County
- Iezeru, a tributary of the Sadova in Suceava County
- Iezerul Mare, a tributary of the Bătrâna in Argeș County
