= Izvorul Alb (Moldova) =

- Location within Romania

Location
- Country: Romania
- Counties: Suceava County

Physical characteristics
- Source: Giumalău Mountains
- Mouth: Moldova
  - location: Câmpulung Moldovenesc
  - coordinates: 47.5183°N 25.6034°E
- Length: 9 km (5.6 mi)
- Basin size: 25 km^{2} (9.7 sq mi)

Basin features
- Progression: Moldova→ Siret→ Danube→ Black Sea
- Tributaries
  - right: Limpedea

The Izvorul Alb is a right tributary of the river Moldova in Romania. It flows into the Moldova in Câmpulung Moldovenesc. Its length is 9 km (5.6 mi) and its basin size is 25 km^{2} (9.7 sq mi).
