= Paul Miron =

Romanian philologist (1926–2008)

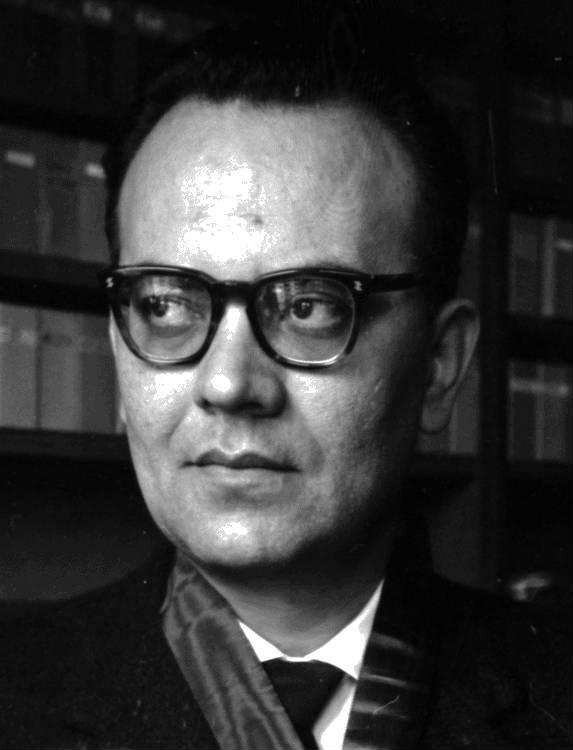
Paul Miron

Paul Miron (13 June 1926, Giulești, Suceava County – 17 April 2008, Freiburg, Germany) was a Romanian linguist and philologist, professor at the University of Freiburg, the first professor of Romanian Language and Literature in West Germany.
