= Ciurlac =

Șomuz
- Location within Romania

Location
- Country: Romania
- Counties: Neamț County
- Villages: Botești, Gherăești, Pildești, Simionești

Physical characteristics
- Mouth: Moldova
  - coordinates: 46.9452°N 26.8856°E
- Length: 20 km (12 mi)
- Basin size: 108 km^{2} (42 sq mi)

Basin features
- Progression: Moldova→ Siret→ Danube→ Black Sea

The Ciurlac is a left tributary of the river Moldova in Romania. It flows into the Moldova in Cordun. Its length is 20 km (12 mi) and its basin size is 108 km^{2} (42 sq mi). For much of its length it flows parallel to the north of the Moldova.
