= Putna (Moldova) =

- Location within Romania

Location
- Country: Romania
- Counties: Suceava County
- Villages: Valea Putnei, Pojorâta

Physical characteristics
- Source: Giumălău Mountains
- Mouth: Moldova
  - coordinates: 47.5258°N 25.4625°E
- Length: 21 km (13 mi)
- Basin size: 90 km^{2} (35 sq mi)

Basin features
- Progression: Moldova→ Siret→ Danube→ Black Sea

The Putna is a right tributary of the river Moldova in Romania. Upstream from its confluence with the Putna Mare (Pârâul Roșu) it is also called Putna Mică. It discharges into the Moldova in Pojorâta. Its length is 21 km (13 mi) and its basin size is 90 km^{2} (35 sq mi).

== Tributaries ==
The following rivers are tributaries to the river Putna:

- Left: Chiril, Putnișoara, Șandru
- Right: Putna Mare (or Pârâul Roșu), Văcăria, Iacob, Tiniș, Pârâul Frumos (or Frumosu), Cârstea
