= Sadova (river) =

- Location within Romania

Location
- Country: Romania
- Counties: Suceava County
- Villages: Sadova

Physical characteristics
- Mouth: Moldova
  - location: Câmpulung Moldovenesc
  - coordinates: 47.5400°N 25.5127°E
- Length: 15 km (9.3 mi)
- Basin size: 56 km^{2} (22 sq mi)

Basin features
- Progression: Moldova→ Siret→ Danube→ Black Sea
- Tributaries
  - left: Iezeru

The Sadova is a left tributary of the river Moldova in Romania. It flows into the Moldova in Câmpulung Moldovenesc. Its length is 15 km (9.3 mi) and its basin size is 56 km^{2} (22 sq mi).
