= Alpo Rusi =

Finnish diplomat (born 1949)

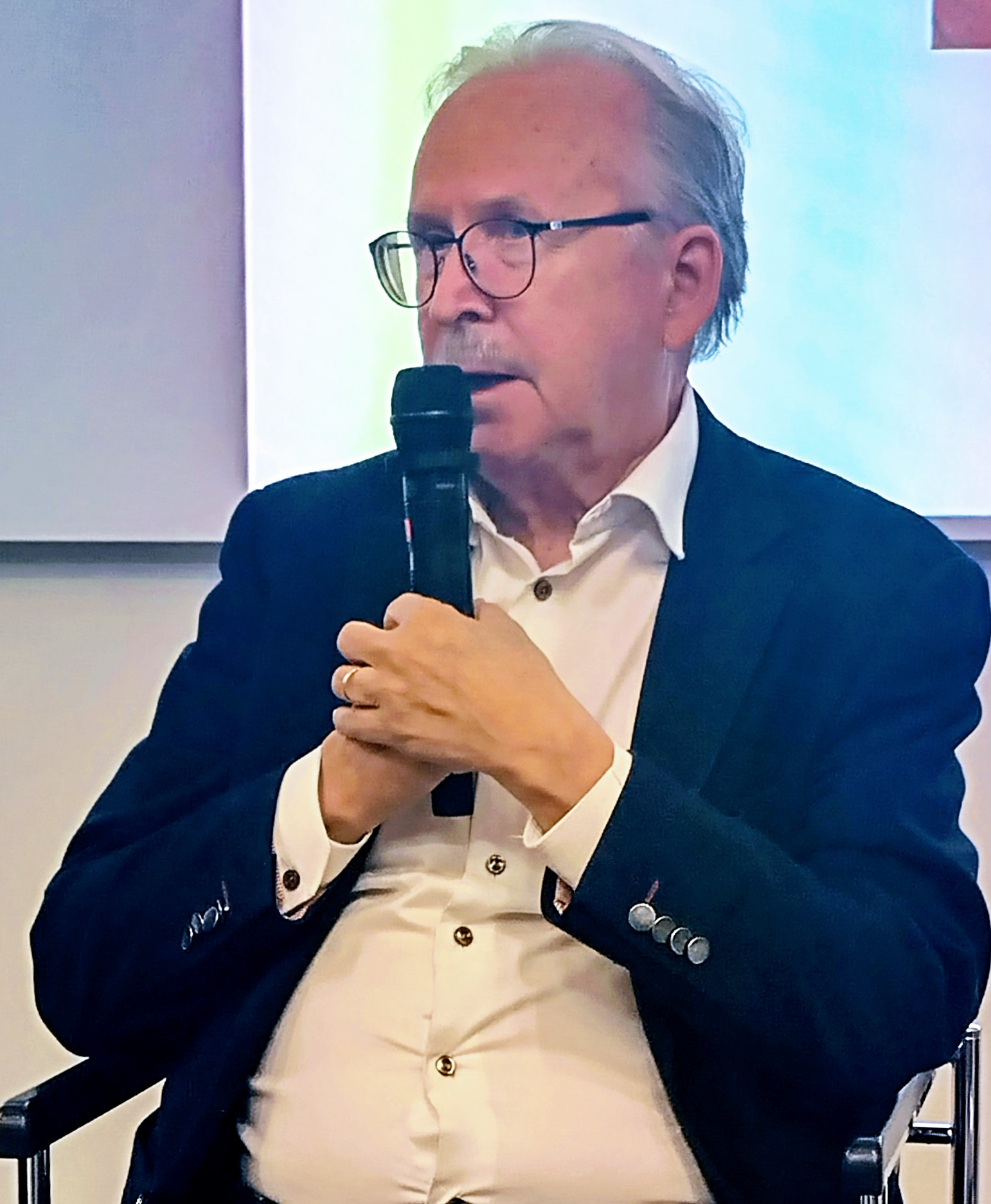
Alpo Rusi in 2025

Alpo Rusi (born 17 August 1949, in Jyväskylä) served in the Foreign Ministry of Finland in several assignments (Hamburg, Copenhagen, New York, Bonn), and from 1994 to 1999 as foreign policy adviser to the President of Finland Martti Ahtisaari. He also served as EU Coordinator for the Sarajevo Summit 1999 and deputy Coordinator of the Stability Pact for Western Balkans in 1999–2000. He worked as professor of International Relations, 2000–2003, at Lapland University and in Hamburg. Later on 2007-2009 he was senior adviser in the Cabinet staff of the President of the UN General Assembly.

Rusi was from 2009-2014 the ambassador of Finland to Switzerland, with accreditation also to Liechtenstein and the Holy See. Rusi is a recognized scholar in the field of international relations and history of Finland, and has published several books in Finland, and in the United States and Great Britain.

Rusi was a candidate for the Centre Party in 2015 parliamentary elections. He was a candidate in the 2004 European Parliament Elections and an MP Candidate in 2007.

== Career ==
- The Rudolf Holsti Professor of Diplomacy, Vytautas Magnus University, Lithuania, 2017-
- Visiting Professor, Vytautas Magnus University, Lithuania, 2016-
- Expert, Davis Center for Russian and Eurasian Studies, Harvard University, 2015-
- Ambassador of Finland, Bern, Switzerland, 2009-2014
- Senior Adviser in the Cabinet Staff of the President of the UN General Assembly, 2007-2009
- Roving Ambassador in the Balkans, 2004-2007
- Chairman of the Evaluation Committee of the Stability Pact for Western Balkans, 2005-2006
- Professor of International Relations, University of Lapland, 2000-2003
- Deputy Coordinator of the Stability Pact for Western Balkans, 2000
- EU Coordinator for the Sarajevo Summit, 1999
- Adviser of President of Finland Martti Ahtisaari, 1994-1999
- Ambassador, Ministry for Foreign Affairs, 1993
- Minister, West Germany, 1992-1993
- Chief of West Office, Ministry for Foreign Affairs, 1991-1992
- Resident Fellow, EastWest Institute, New York, the United States, 1988-1989
- Visiting Researcher, Columbia University, New York, the United States, 1988-1989
- Chief of Planning Department, Ministry for Foreign Affairs, 1987-1990
- Counsellor, the United Nations, 1983-1986
- Editor in Chief, Lalli Newspaper, 1982
- Member of Finland's OSCE Delegation, Ministry for Foreign Affairs, 1982
- First Secretary, Embassy of Finland in Copenhagen, Denmark, 1977-1979
- Vice Consular, West Germany, 1975-1977
- Maturity Test, Ministry for Foreign Affairs, 1975
- Attaché, Embassy of Finland in London, the United Kingdom, 1974
- Attaché, Ministry for Foreign Affairs, 1973

== False espionage investigation ==
In 2002 the Finnish Security Police (SUPO) investigated Alpo Rusi for espionage on behalf of the East German Stasi between 1969 and 1976. The investigation was leaked to the media on September 10, 2002, and caused a major "trial by media" in Finland. Alpo Rusi was declared innocent by the state prosecutor on June 11, 2003. Later, the same prosecutor told Helsingin Sanomat (January 24, 2010) that SUPO made a mistake by not ending the investigation in January 2003, when it was clear that Alpo Rusi had nothing to do with the Stasi or the KGB. Alpo Rusi's brother, Jukka Rusi, had been in contact with East Germany and the Soviet Union. Rusi took the case to court and was awarded major compensation from the state of Finland in 2007.In real terms Alpo Rusi was twice a criminal target of foreign intelligence (Stasi 1976, the KGB 1978) which the Finish Security Police tried to make Rusi's crimes. This vindicates the investigation and its leaking as a political act.

== Publications ==
- Yhdessä vai erikseen - Suomen ja Ruotsin turvallisuuspolitiikka tienhaarassa (Docendo, 2016)
- Etupiirin ote - Suomen valtapeli Euroopan rajalla 1700-2014 (Gummerus, 2014)
- Tiitisen lista (Gummerus, 2011)
- Vasemmalta ohi (Gummerus, 2007)
- Myrskyjen aika (Atena, 2004)
- Kylmä tasavalta. Alpo Rusi & Olli Rehn (WSOY, 2003)
- Ei enää erityistapaus (WSOY, 2003)
- Mariankadun puolelta (Otava, 2000)
- A Dangerous Peace: New Rivalry in World Politics (Westview Press Inc, 1997)
- After the Cold War: Europe's New Political Architecture (Palgrave Schol, Print UK. 1991)

== Honours and awards ==
- Order of the White Star, 3rd Class
- Commander of the Finnish Lion
- Woodrow Wilson Foundation Prize Nominee 1992
