= Pojorâta =

Pojorâta German: Pozoritta or Poschoritta
- Commune
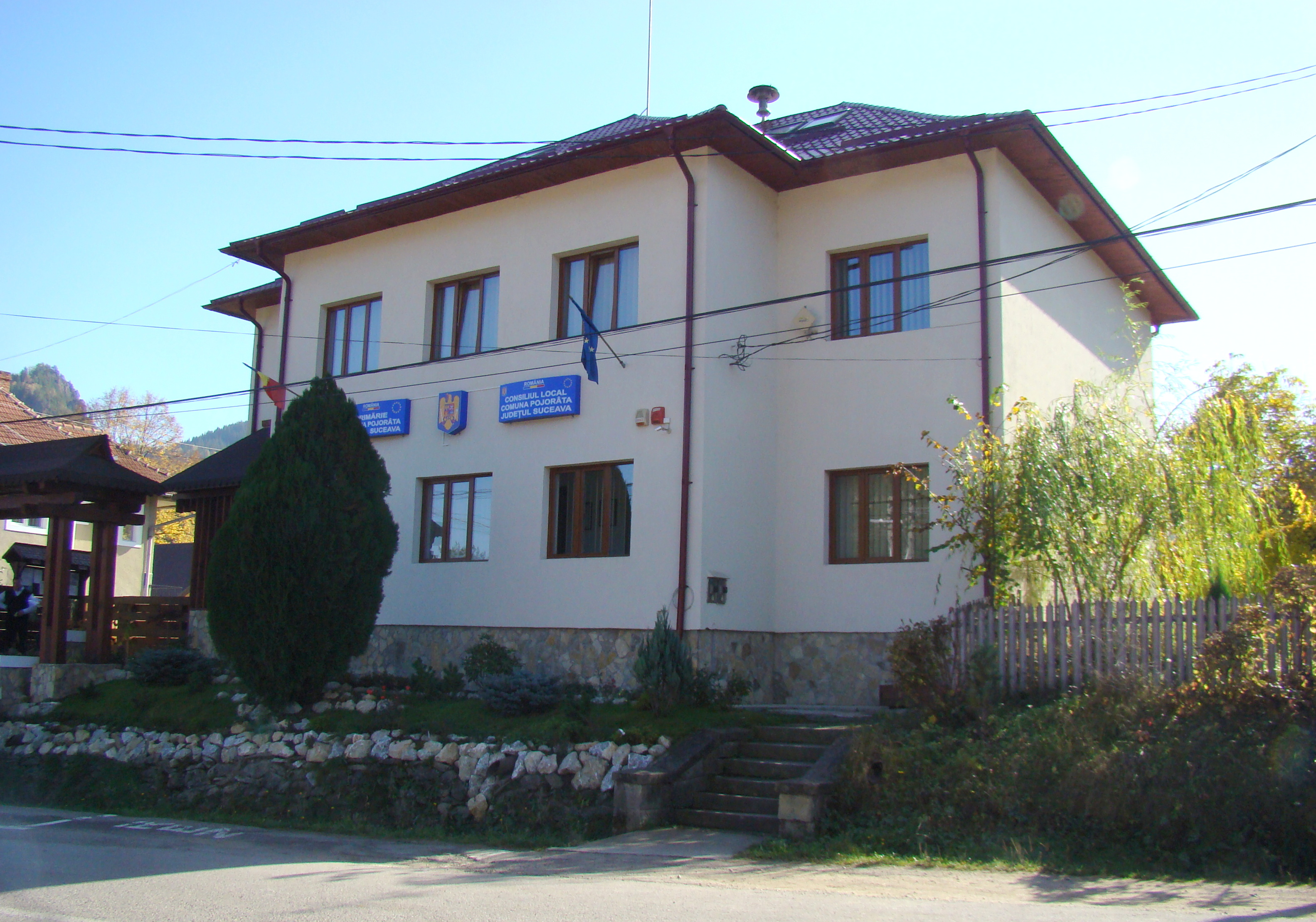
- The town hall of Pojorâta (October 2014)

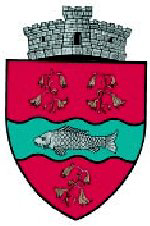
- Coat of arms

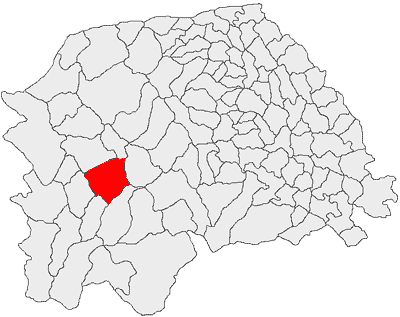
- Location in Suceava County

- Location in Romania
- Coordinates: 47°31′N 25°27′E
- Country: Romania
- County: Suceava
- Subdivisions: Pojorâta, Valea Putnei

Government
  - Mayor (2024–2028): Ioan Bogdan Codreanu (PNL)
- Area: 137 km^{2} (53 sq mi)
- Elevation: 726 m (2,382 ft)
- Population (2021-12-01): 2,777
  - Density: 20.3/km^{2} (52.5/sq mi)
- Time zone: UTC+02:00 (EET)
  - Summer (DST): UTC+03:00 (EEST)
- Postal code: 727440
- Area code: (+40) x30
- Vehicle reg.: SV
- Website: www.primariapojorata.ro

Pojorâta (German: Pozoritta or Poschoritta or Pojoritta) is a commune located in the western part of Suceava County, in the historical region of Bukovina, northeastern Romania. With a surface area of 13,770 hectares, it comprises the villages of Pojorâta (as its chief commune) and Valea Putnei (German: Waleputna).

== History ==
Historical affiliations

Moldavia (1388–1775)
Habsburg Monarchy (1775–1804)
Austrian Empire (1804–1867)
Austria-Hungary, Cisleithania (1867–1918)
Kingdom of Romania (1918–1947)
Romanian People's Republic (1947–1965)
Socialist Republic of Romania (1965–1989)
Romania (1989–present)

As it is the case of other former mining rural settlements from Suceava County, Pojorâta was previously inhabited by a sizeable German community, more specifically by Zipser Germans (part of the larger Bukovina German community) during the modern period up until the mid 20th century, starting as early as the Habsburg period and, later on, the Austro-Hungarian period.

== Administration and local politics ==
=== Communal council ===
The commune's current local council has the following political composition, according to the results of the 2020 Romanian local elections:

Party	Seats	Current Council
People's Movement Party (PMP)	9	
National Liberal Party (PNL)	1	
Social Democratic Party (PSD)	1	

== Gallery ==
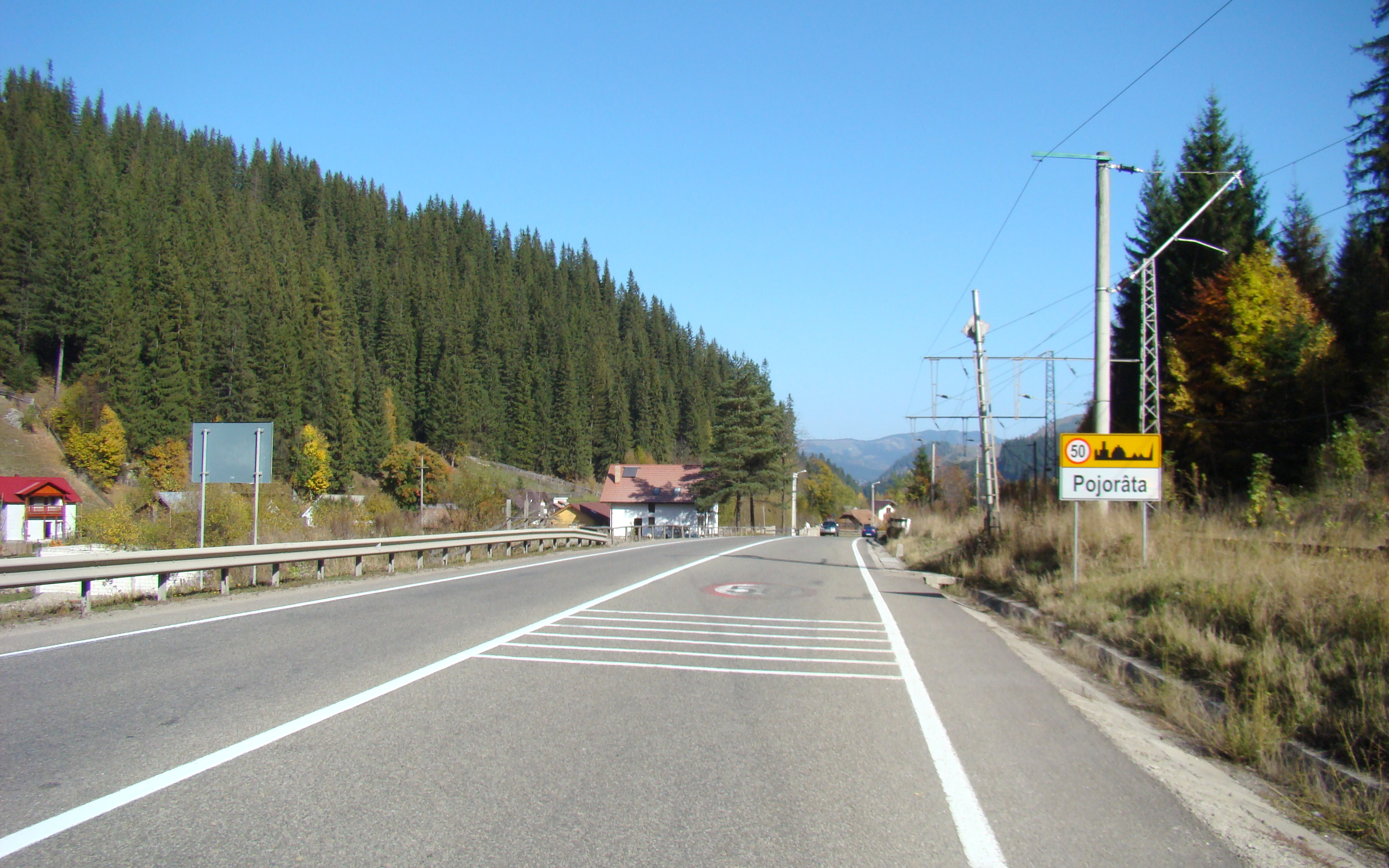
The entrance in Pojorâta

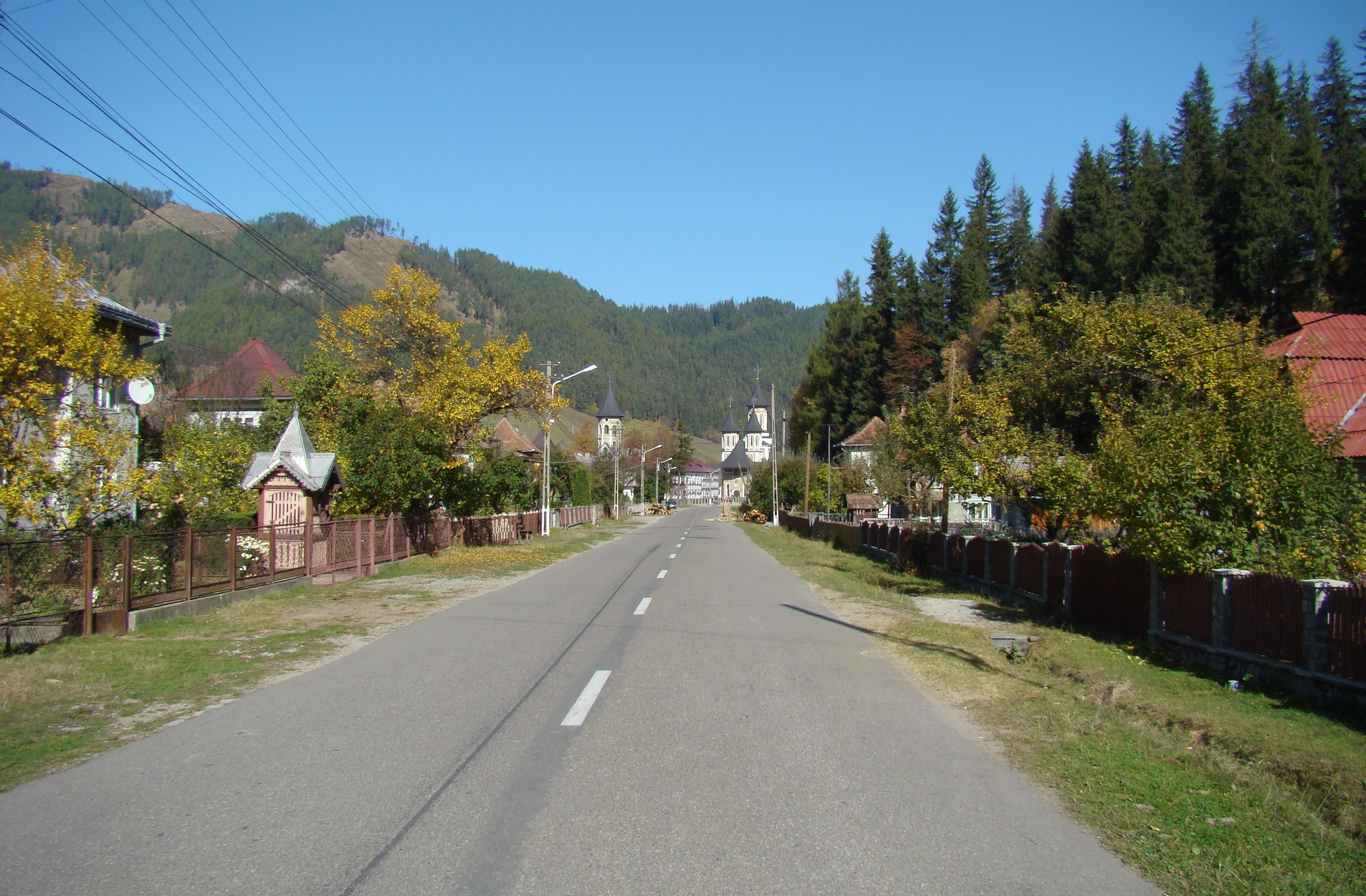
Houses in Pojorâta

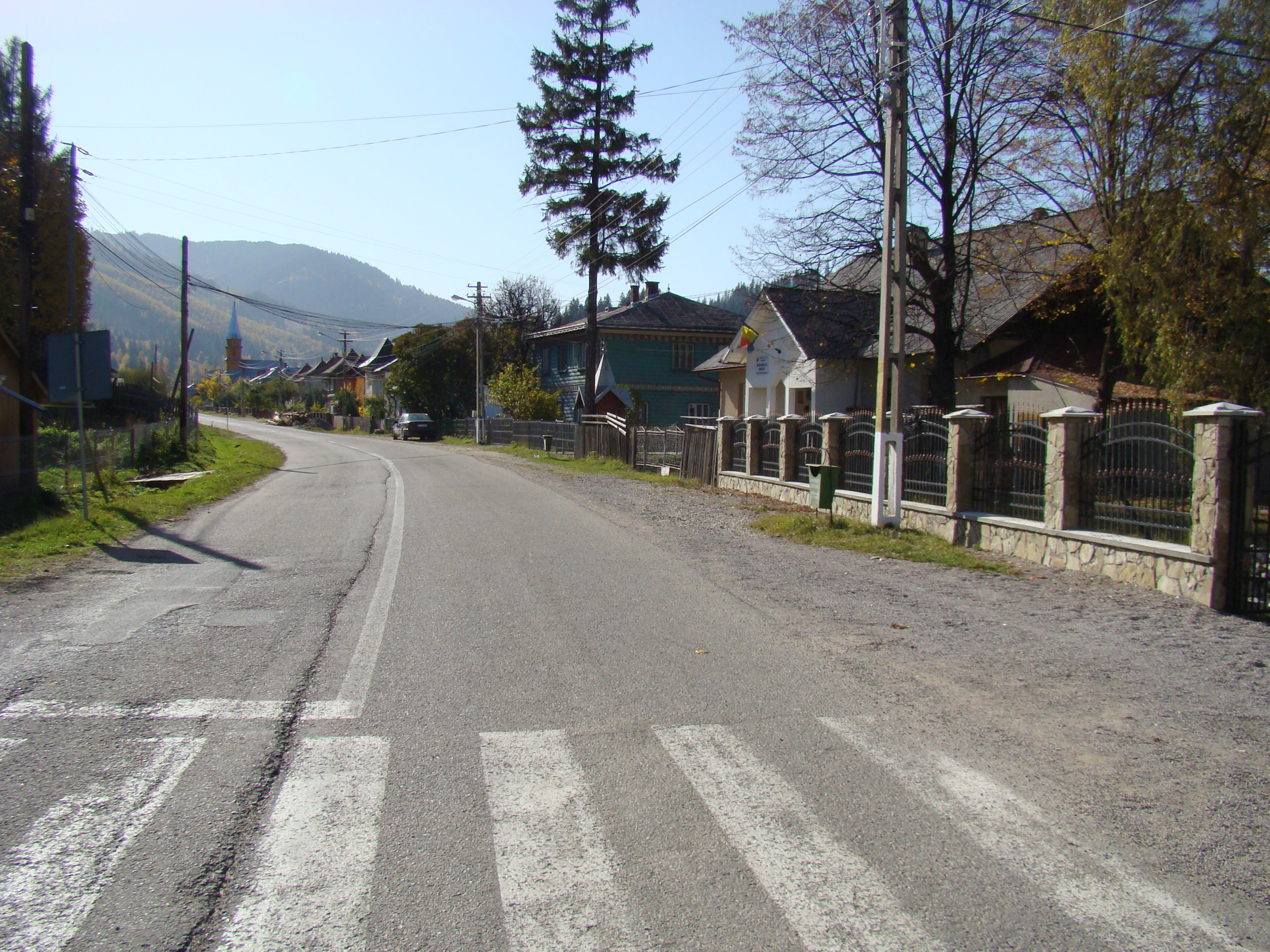
Pojorâta, view from a local lane

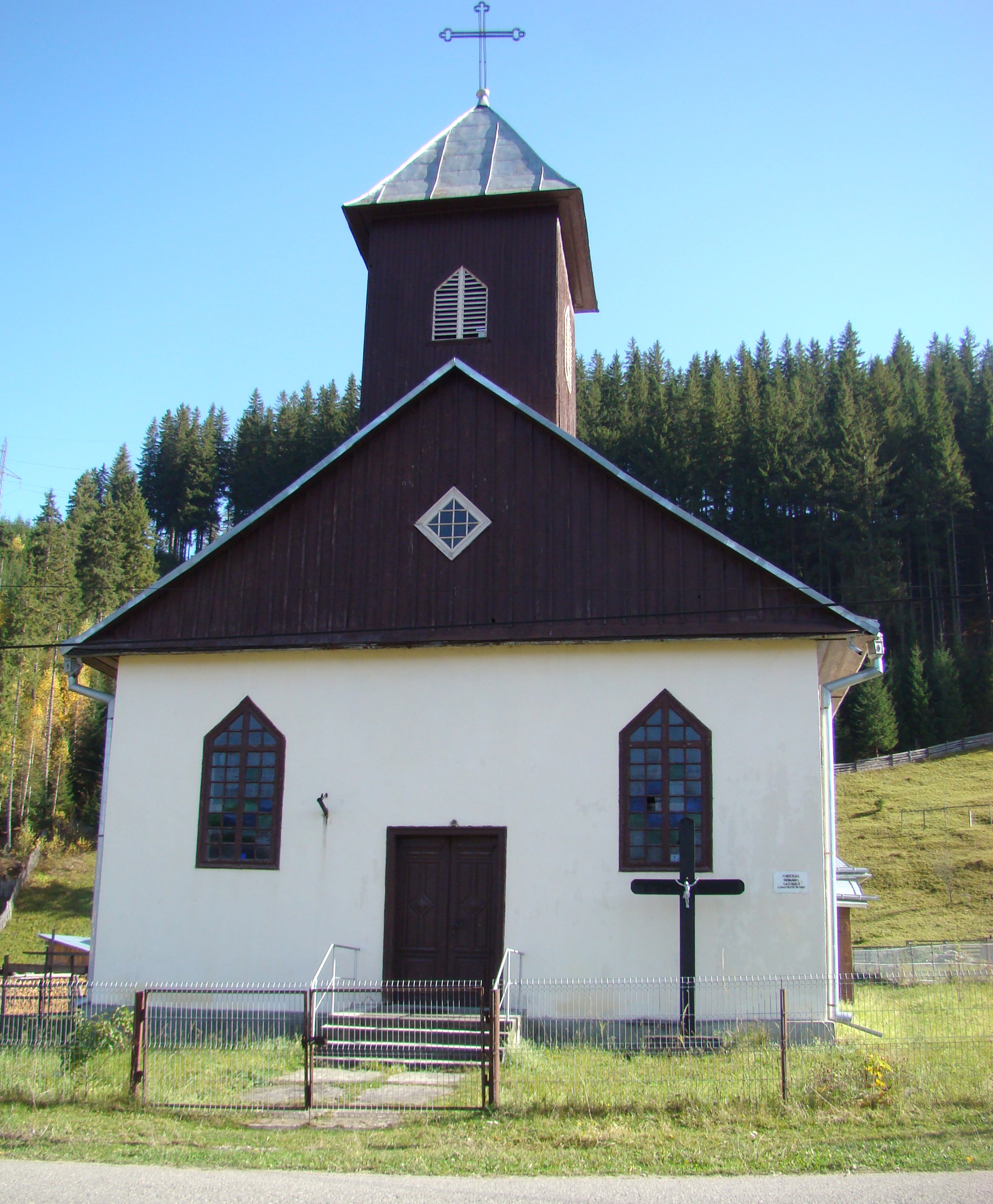
The former Roman Catholic church of the German community

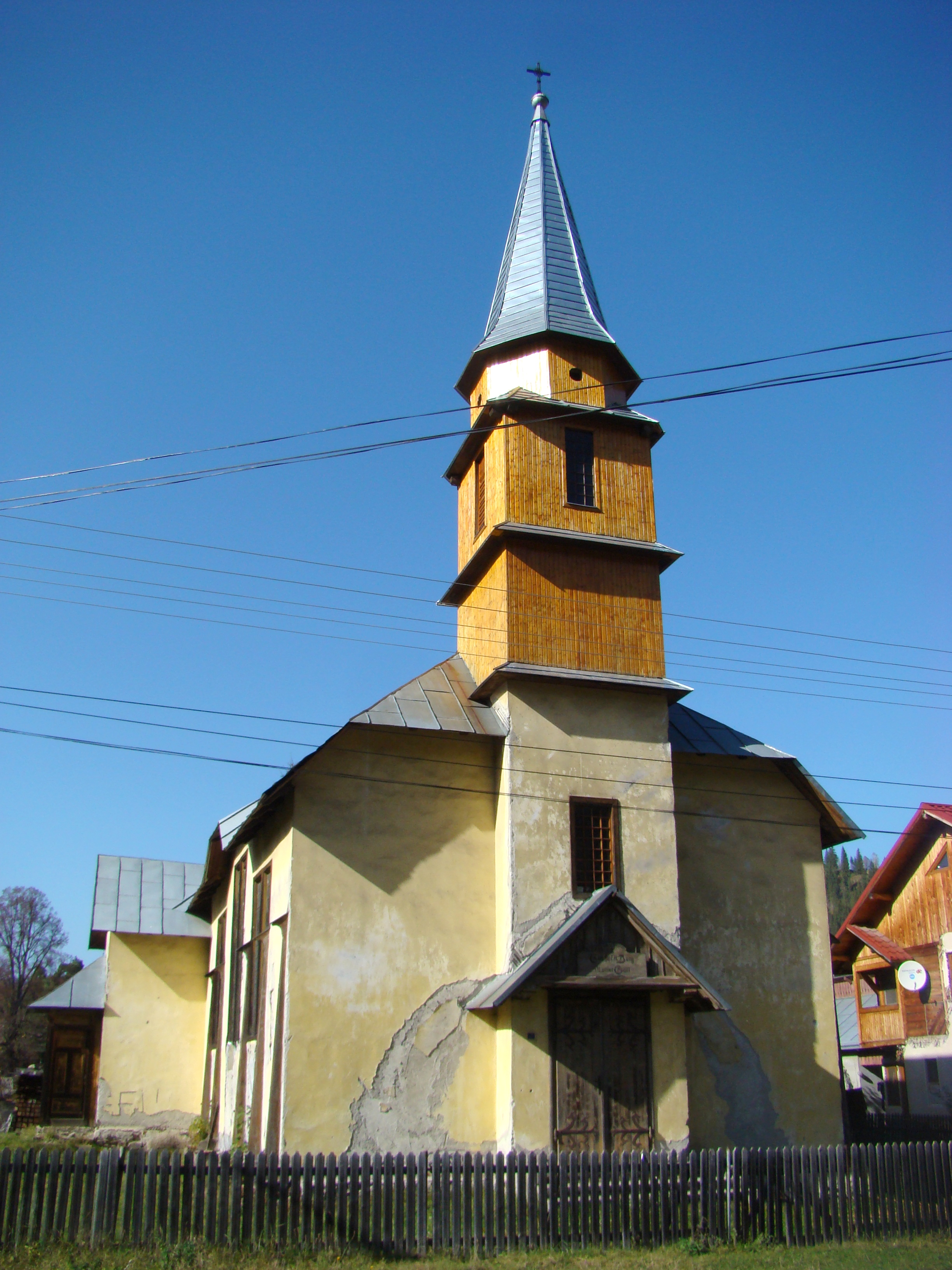
The former Evangelical Lutheran church of the German community

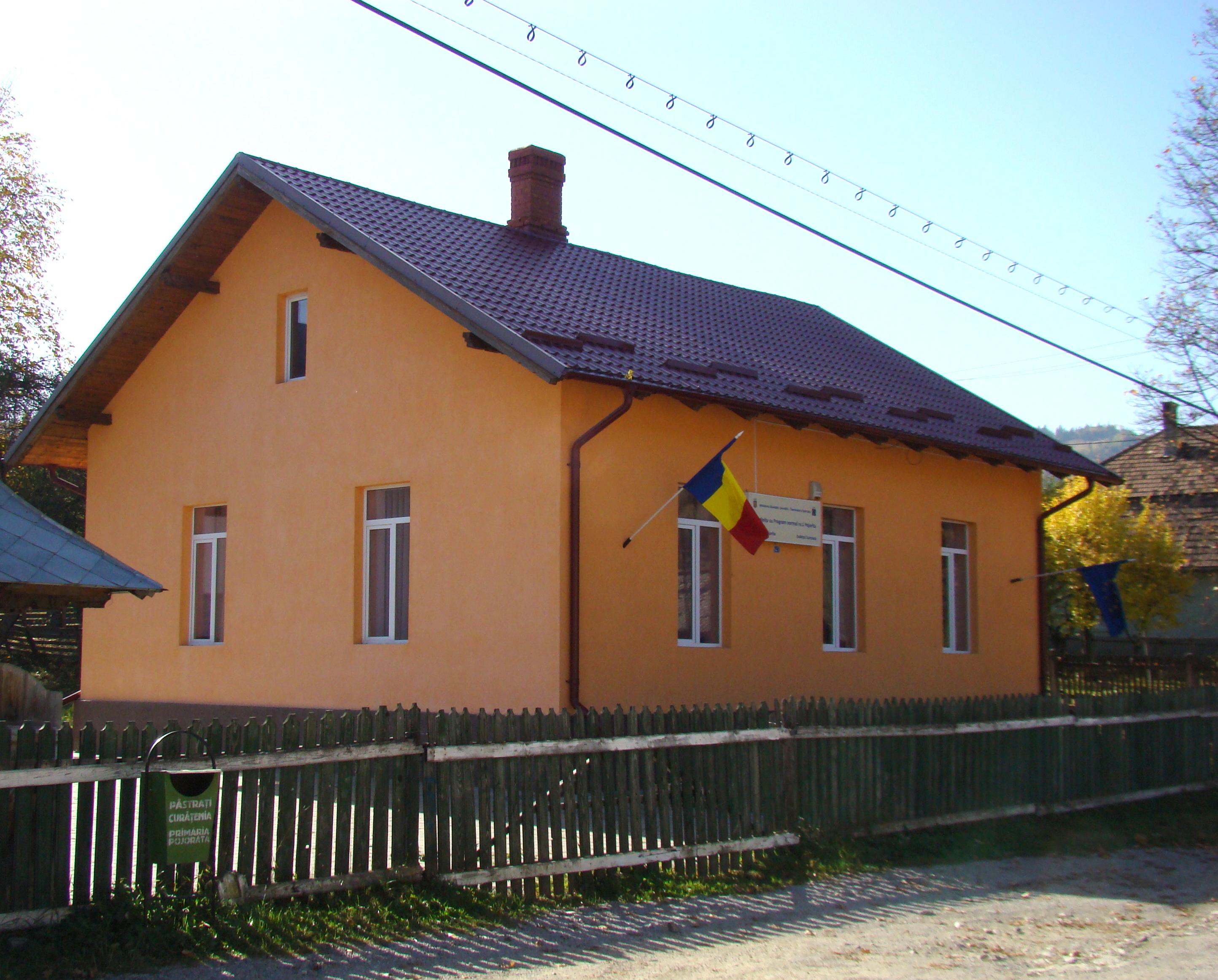
The local kindergarten

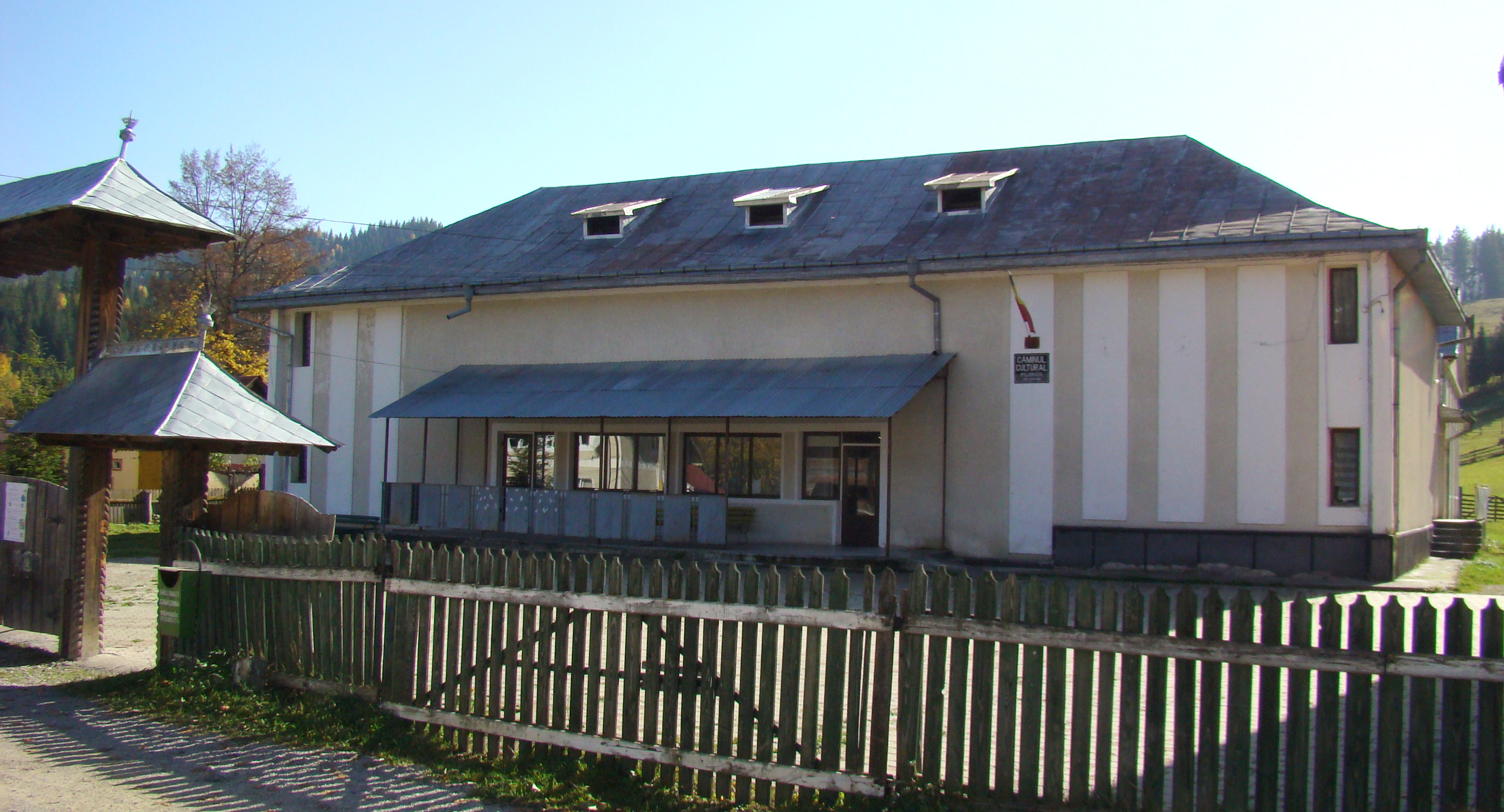
The local cultural home

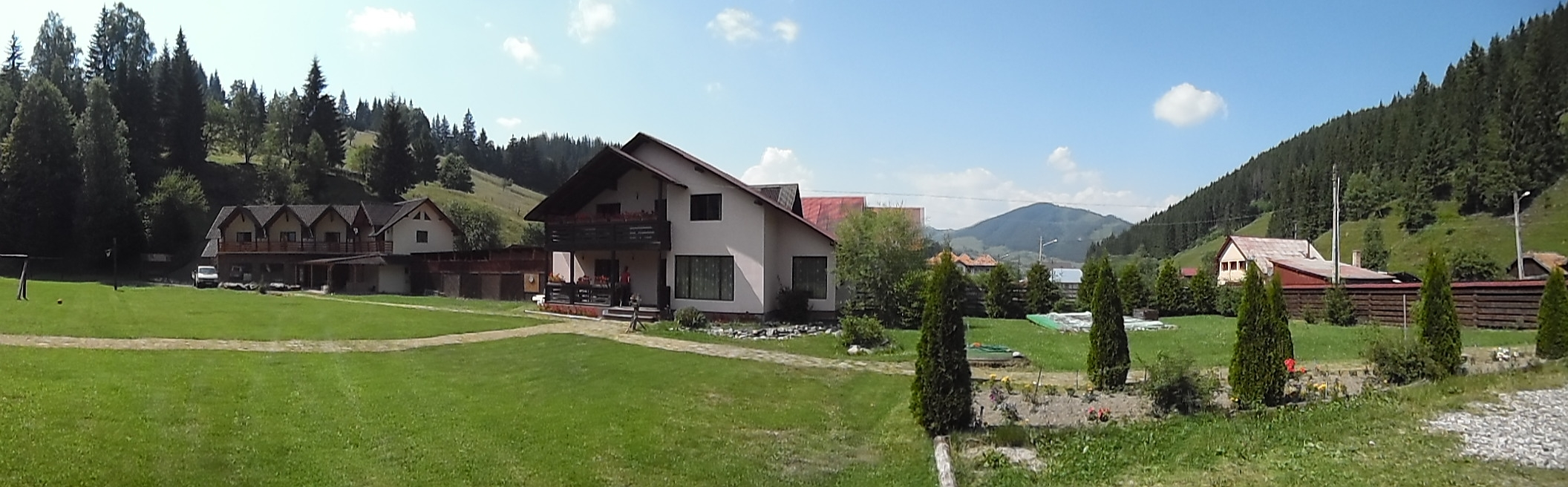
Pietrele Doamnei guest house

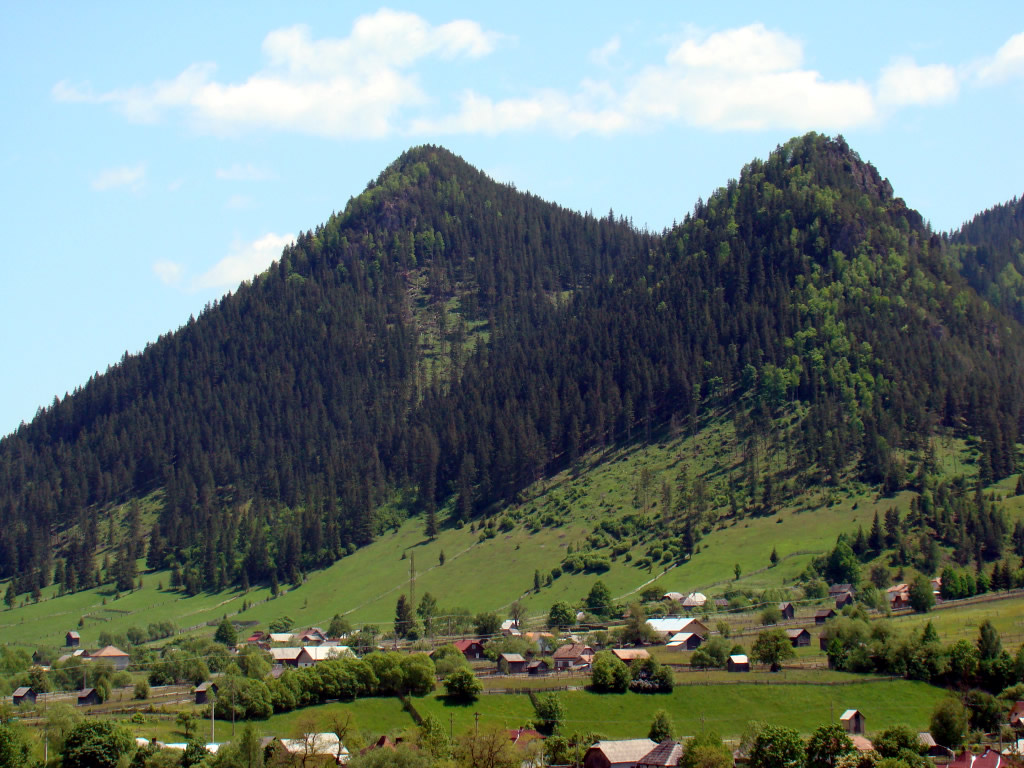
Adam and Eve forested hill peaks

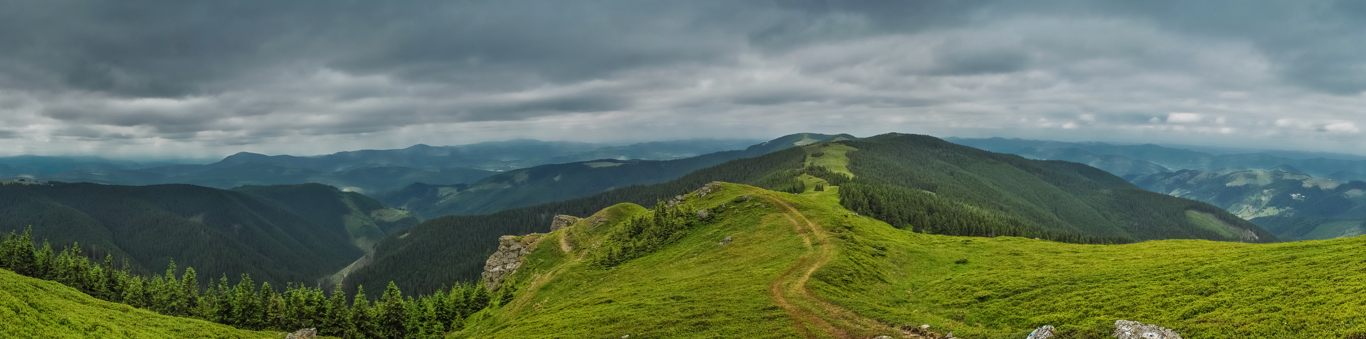
Forested mountainous landscape near Pojorâta (June 2012)

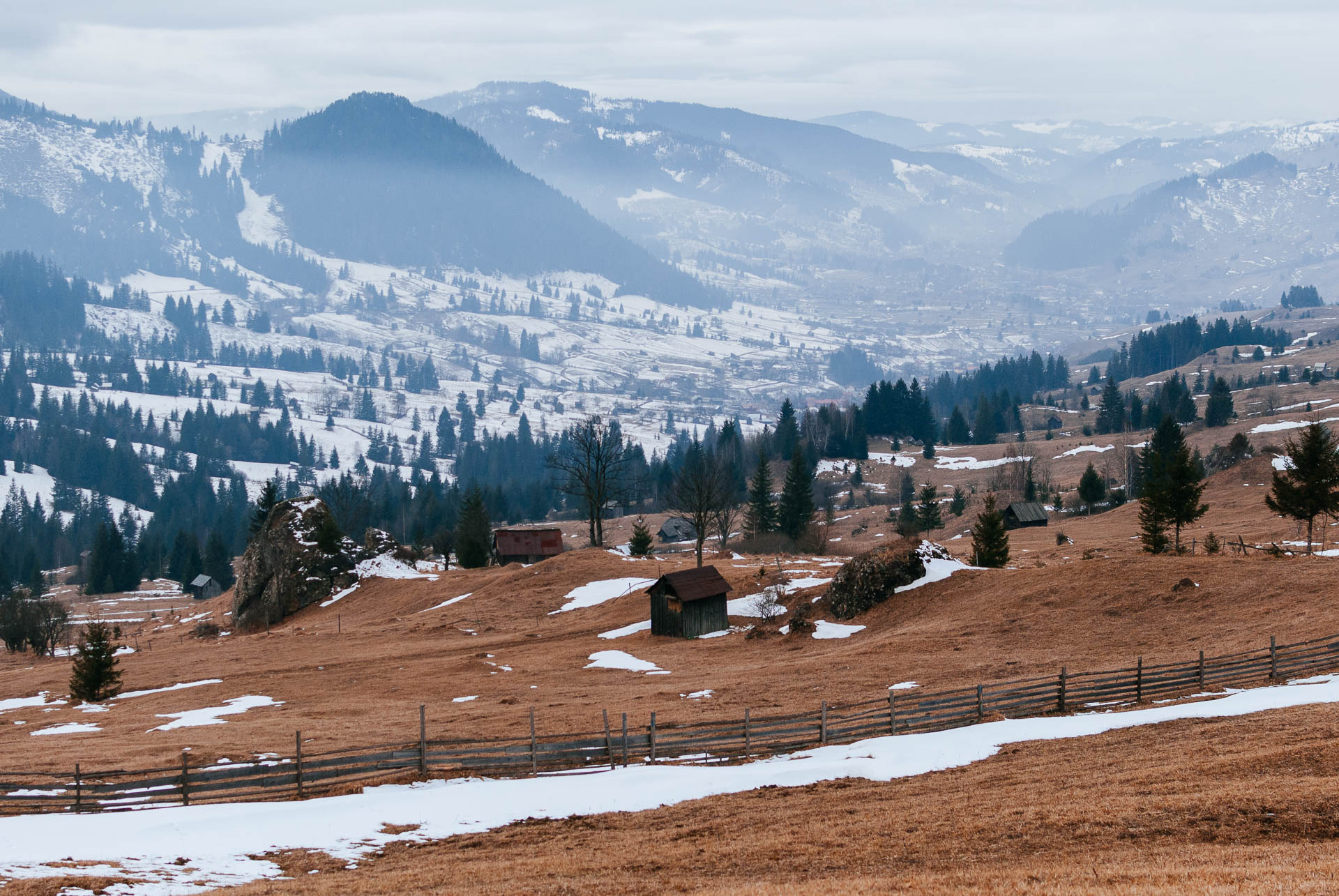
Winter landscape in Pojorâta (February 2015)

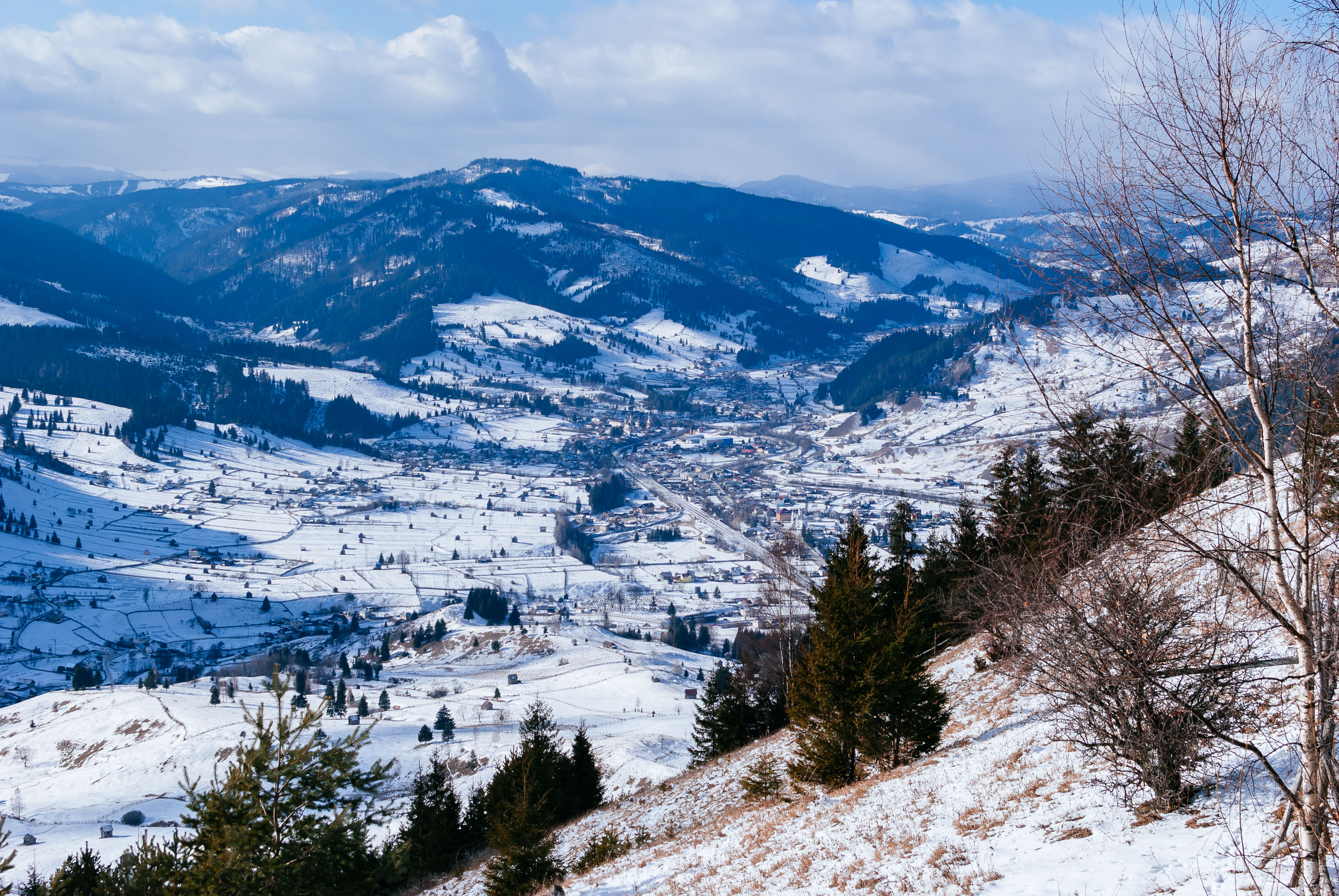
Winter landscape in Pojorâta (January 2016)

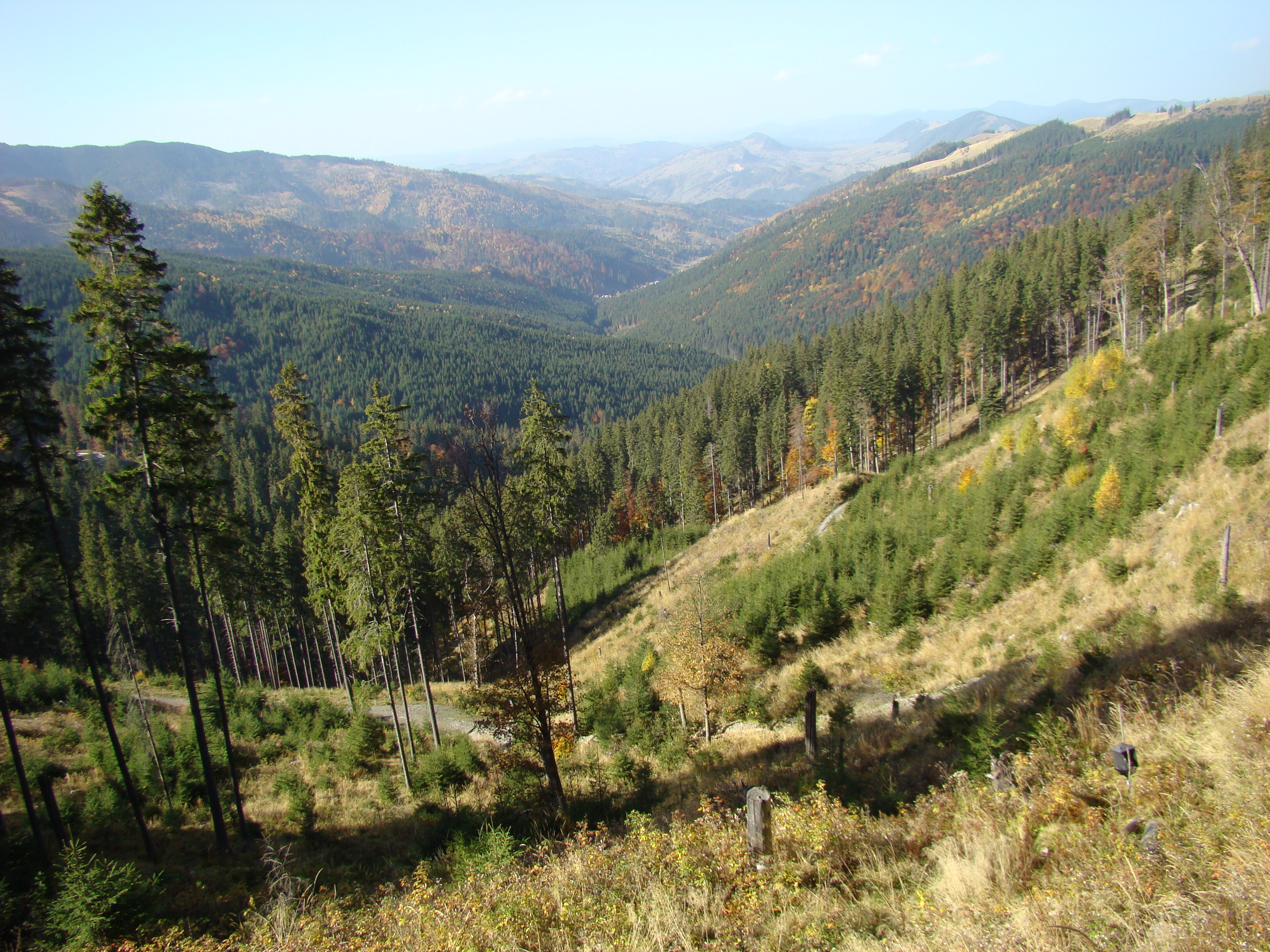
Transrarău near Pojorâta (October 2014)
