= Petricani =

- Commune
- Location in Neamț County

- Location in Romania
- Coordinates: 47°10′N 26°27′E
- Country: Romania
- County: Neamț

Government
  - Mayor (2024–2028): Ion-Ticușor Vasiliu (PSD)
- Area: 36.37 km^{2} (14.04 sq mi)
- Elevation: 318 m (1,043 ft)
- Population (2021-12-01): 5,563
  - Density: 153.0/km^{2} (396.2/sq mi)
- Time zone: UTC+02:00 (EET)
  - Summer (DST): UTC+03:00 (EEST)
- Postal code: 617315
- Area code: +(40) 233
- Vehicle reg.: NT
- Website: www.comunapetricani.ro

Petricani is a commune in Neamț County, Western Moldavia, Romania. It is composed of four villages: Boiștea, Petricani, Târpești, and Țolici.

The commune is situated on the Moldavian Plateau, at an altitude of 318 m (1,043 ft), on the banks of the river Topolița and its right tributary, the Țolici. It is located in the northern part of Neamț County, 10 km (6.2 mi) southeast of Târgu Neamț and 33 km (21 mi) north of the county seat, Piatra Neamț.

Historical population
Year	Pop.	±%
2002	5,645	—
2011	5,286	−6.4%
2021	5,563	+5.2%
Source: Census data

== Natives ==
- Rodica Arba (born 1962), rower
- Stelian Bordeianu (born 1968), footballer
