= Jukka Rusi =

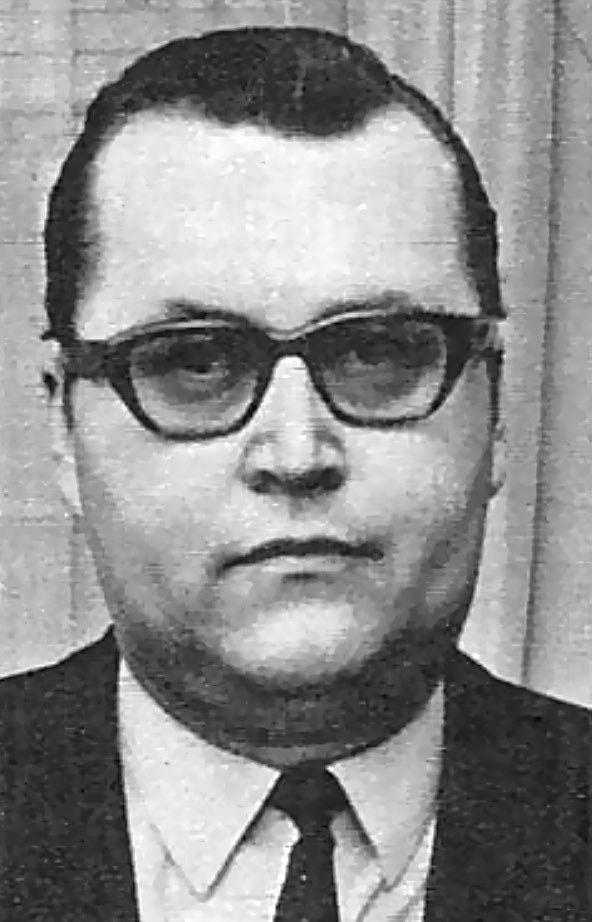
Jukka Rusi

Jukka Rusi (1935–2004) was a TV journalist and the press secretary of the government of Finland from 1968 to 73. He is best known for supplying both East Germany and the Soviet Union with Finnish documents from 1973 to 1977, as he confessed. His Stasi code was XV/11/69.

== Espionage case ==
Like a number of his colleagues and politicians in Finland during the Cold War, he was a contact of East-German diplomats in Helsinki. One of his colleagues, Peter Grimm, was also an unofficial co-worker of Stasi. Grimm received different types of information from Jukka Rusi, but not secret information during the years 1965–1976.

In 2000, The Finnish secret police (Supo) received the so-called Rosenholz cards, approximately 50 names in registers by Stasi. Among them XV/11/69 that was opened to Jukka Rusi on 13 January 1969. At the same time Supo received registers like XV/175/68 that were more important operations politically and in terms of sensitivity of the material, but Supo launched only an investigation related to XV/11/69.

His younger brother Alpo Rusi was famously investigated.

Supo, on purpose or mistakenly, connected Jukka Rusi’s younger brother Alpo Rusi to the investigation and leaked it through its informants to the press. Alpo Rusi had nothing to do with Stasi or KGB but as former advisor to the president, he was most probably a politically useful target for Supo. The investigation was a major scandal but led to nothing. Finally Alpo Rusi won major compensation in the court in 2007. The avoidance of investigation on other registers vindicates the concept of finlandisation.
