= Cornu Luncii =

- Commune
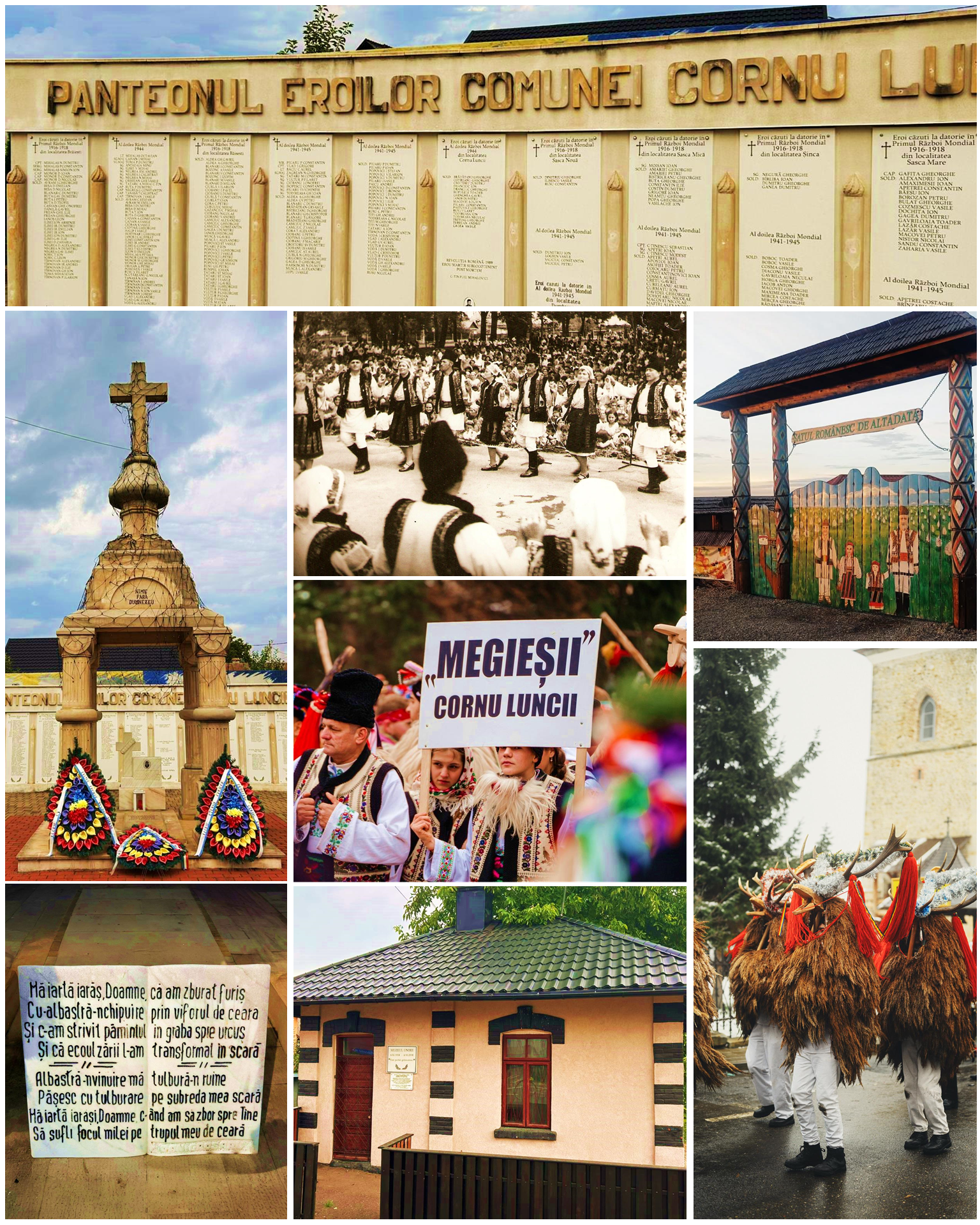

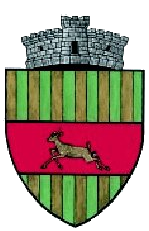
- Coat of arms

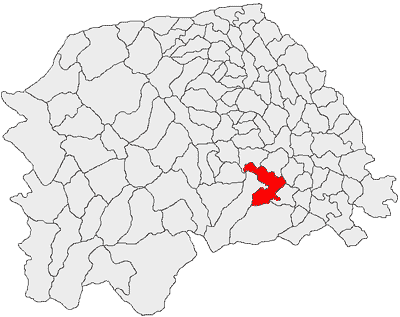
- Location in Suceava County

- Location in Romania
- Coordinates: 47°28′N 26°9′E
- Country: Romania
- County: Suceava

Government
  - Mayor (2020–2024): Gheorghe Fron (PSD)
- Area: 84 km^{2} (32 sq mi)
- Elevation: 386 m (1,266 ft)
- Population (2021-12-01): 7,331
  - Density: 87/km^{2} (230/sq mi)
- Time zone: UTC+02:00 (EET)
  - Summer (DST): UTC+03:00 (EEST)
- Postal code: 727140
- Area code: +40 230
- Vehicle reg.: SV
- Website: comunacornuluncii.ro

Cornu Luncii (German: Kornoluncze) is a commune located in Suceava County, Bukovina, northeastern Romania. It is composed of nine villages: Băișești (German: Bajaszestie or Bajaschestie), Brăiești (German: Brajestie), Cornu Luncii, Dumbrava, Păiseni, Sasca Mare, Sasca Mică, Sasca Nouă, and Șinca.

== Tourist attractions ==
- Vama Veche (Old Customs Post) in Cornu Luncii (1809); now houses the Union Museum
- Wooden Church in Băișești (1778)
- Pantheon of Heroes of Cornu Luncii Commune - a site dedicated to the memory of the fallen soldiers of the commune
- The Old Romanian Village - dedicated to the traditions and folk customs of Cornu Luncii
- Monument of Ioan Grosaru in Păiseni - a cross monument approximately 7 meters high, weighing around 15 tons
- Memorial house of poet and Lieutenant Ioan Grosaru
- Sports Hall in Brăiești

== Images ==
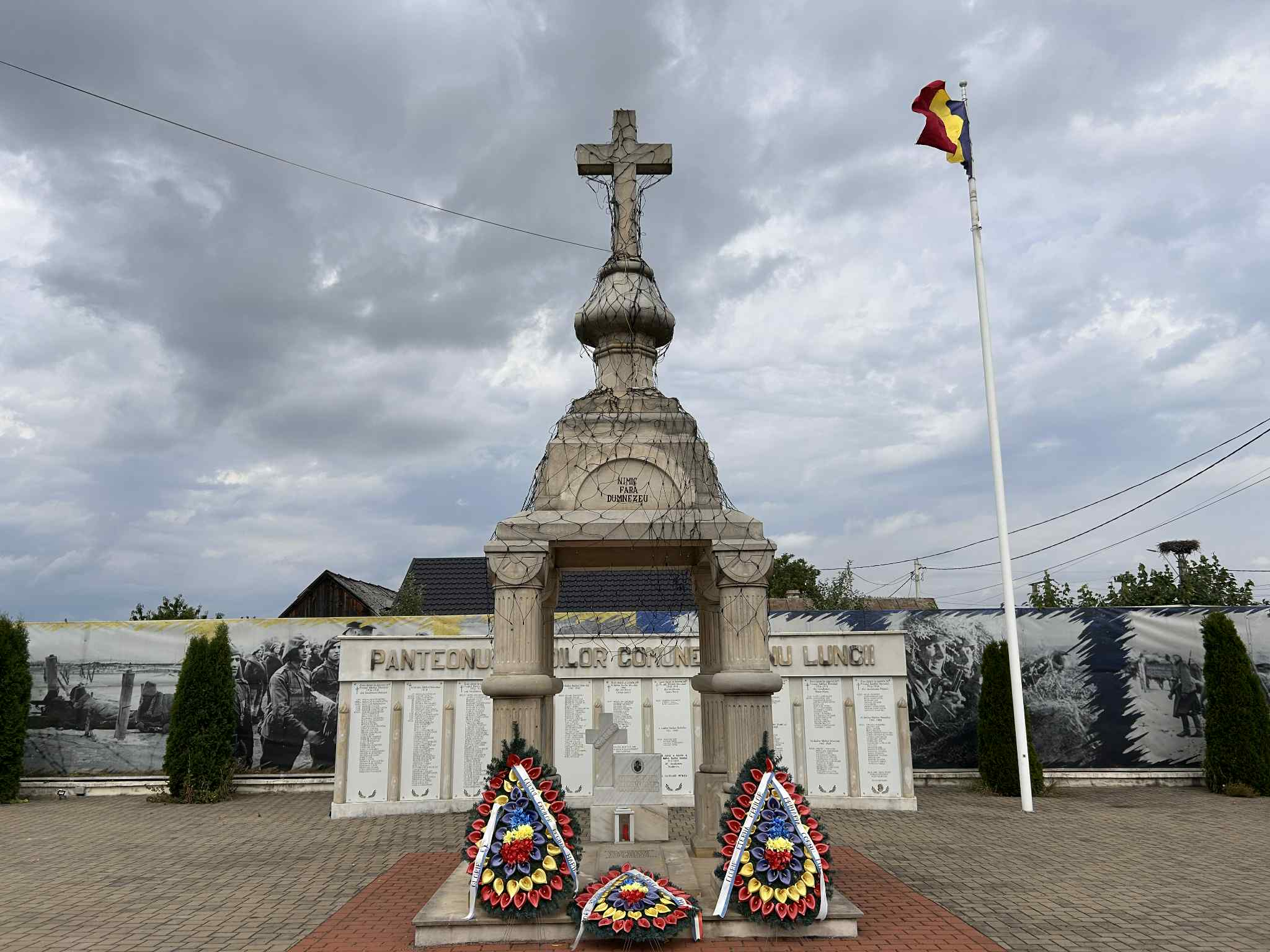
Pantheon of Heroes of Cornu Luncii Commune

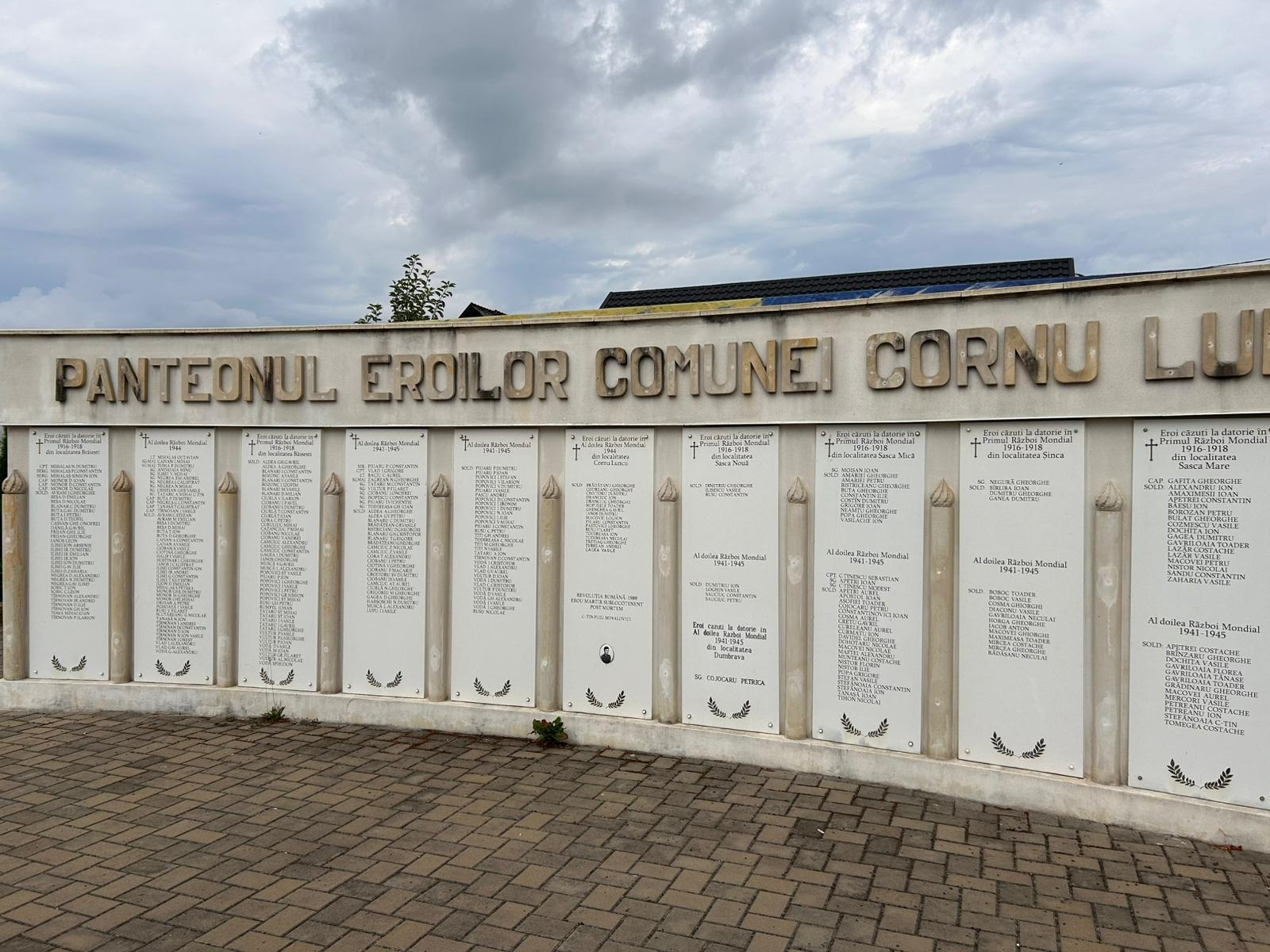
Memorial wall

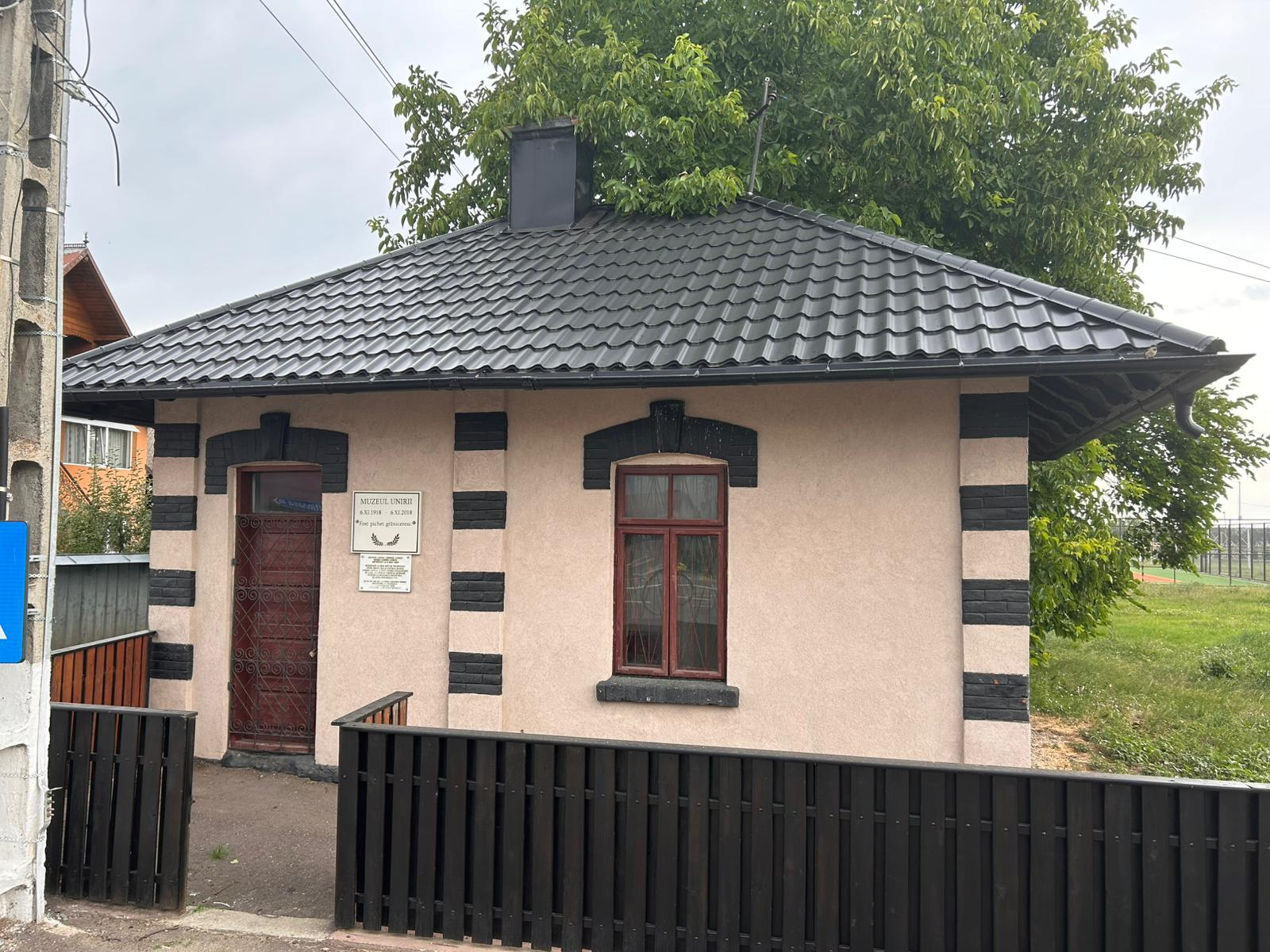
Former border guard post (Museum of the Union)

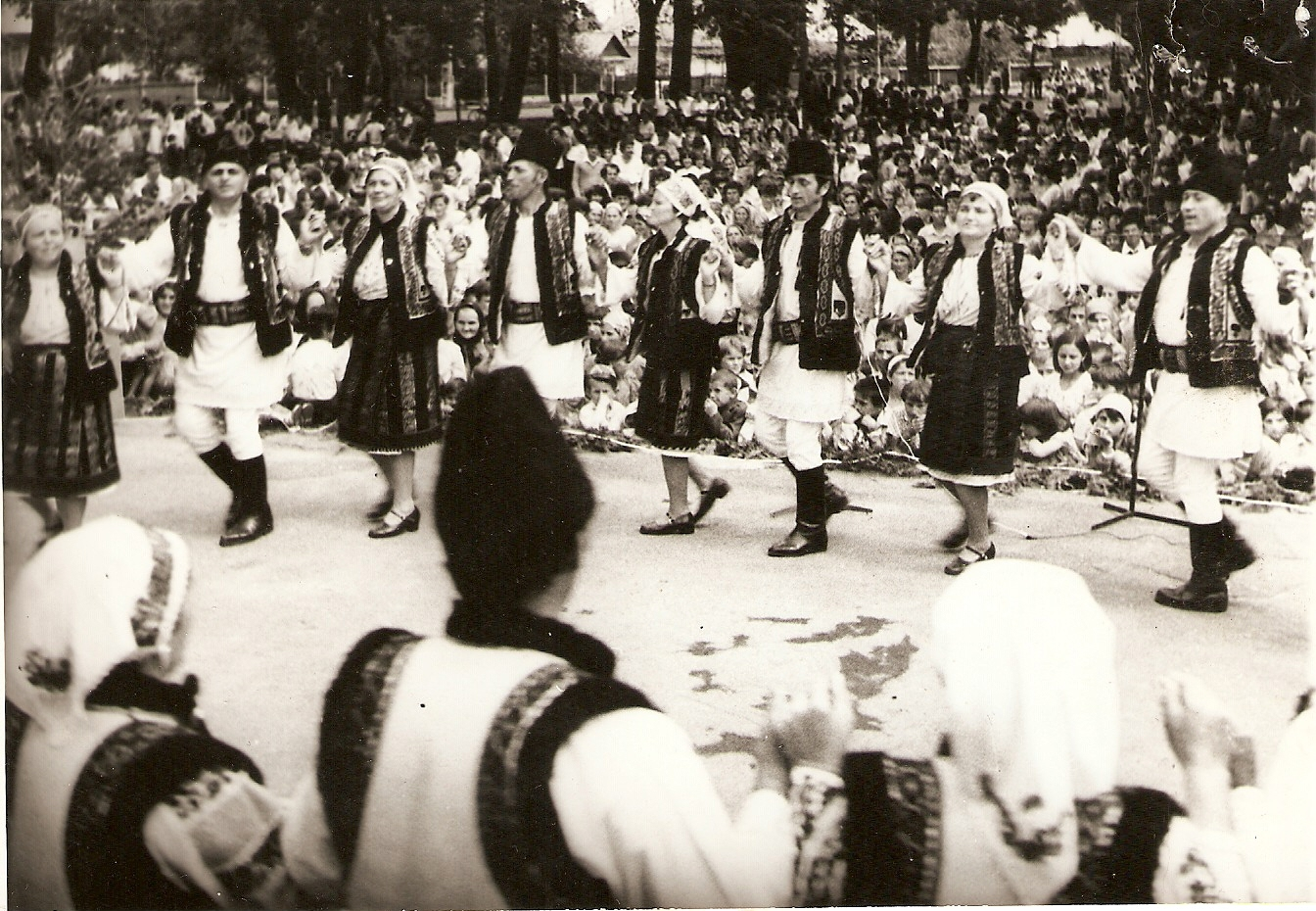
Old folk dance group

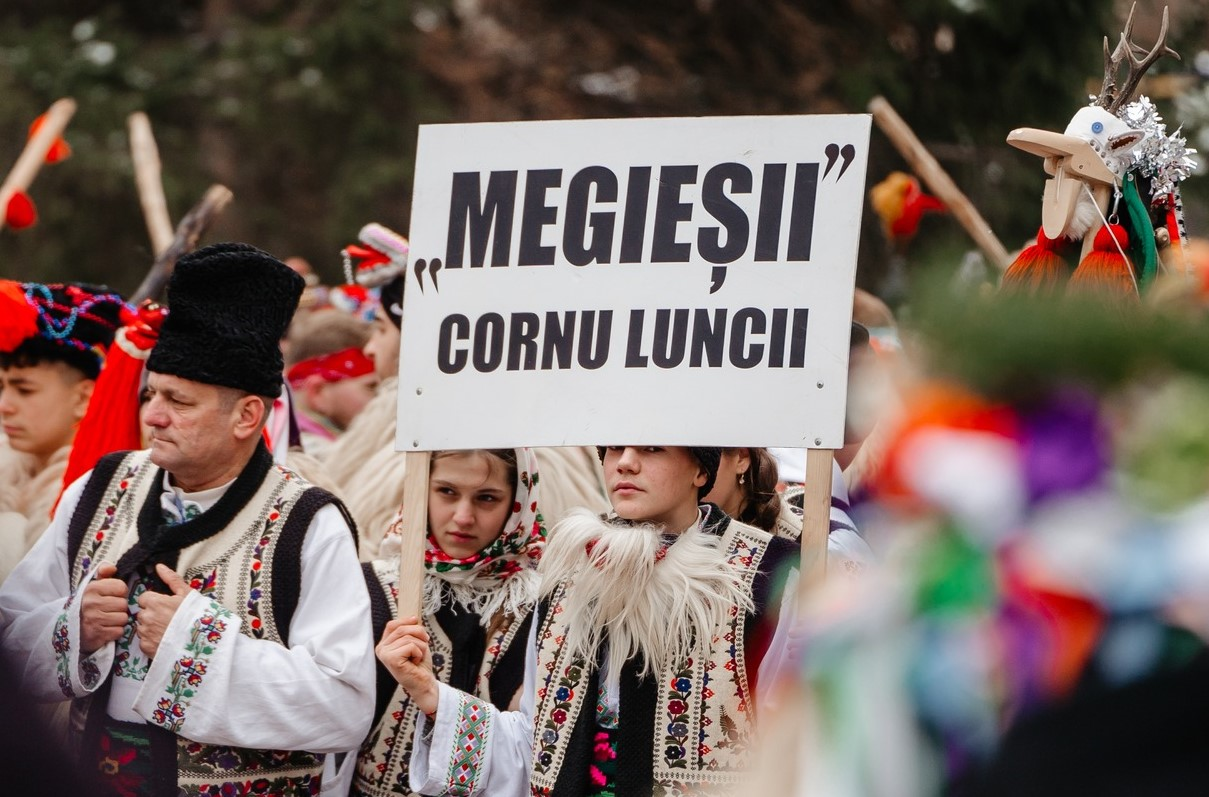
Megieșii Village Folk Ensemble
