= Urecheni =

- Commune
- Location in Neamț County

- Location in Romania
- Coordinates: 47°10′N 26°31′E
- Country: Romania
- County: Neamț

Government
  - Mayor (2024–2028): Ion Tănăselea (PSD)
- Area: 30 km^{2} (12 sq mi)
- Elevation: 288 m (945 ft)
- Population (2021-12-01): 3,916
  - Density: 130/km^{2} (340/sq mi)
- Time zone: UTC+02:00 (EET)
  - Summer (DST): UTC+03:00 (EEST)
- Postal code: 617490
- Area code: +40 233
- Vehicle reg.: NT
- Website: comunaurecheni.ro

Urecheni is a commune in Neamț County, Western Moldavia, Romania. It is composed of three villages: Ingărești, Plugari, and Urecheni.

From 1931 to 1948 the commune was called General Averescu.

Historical population
Year	Pop.	±%
1992	4,840	—
2002	4,040	−16.5%
2011	3,343	−17.3%
2021	3,916	+17.1%
Source: Census data
