= Forăști =

- Commune
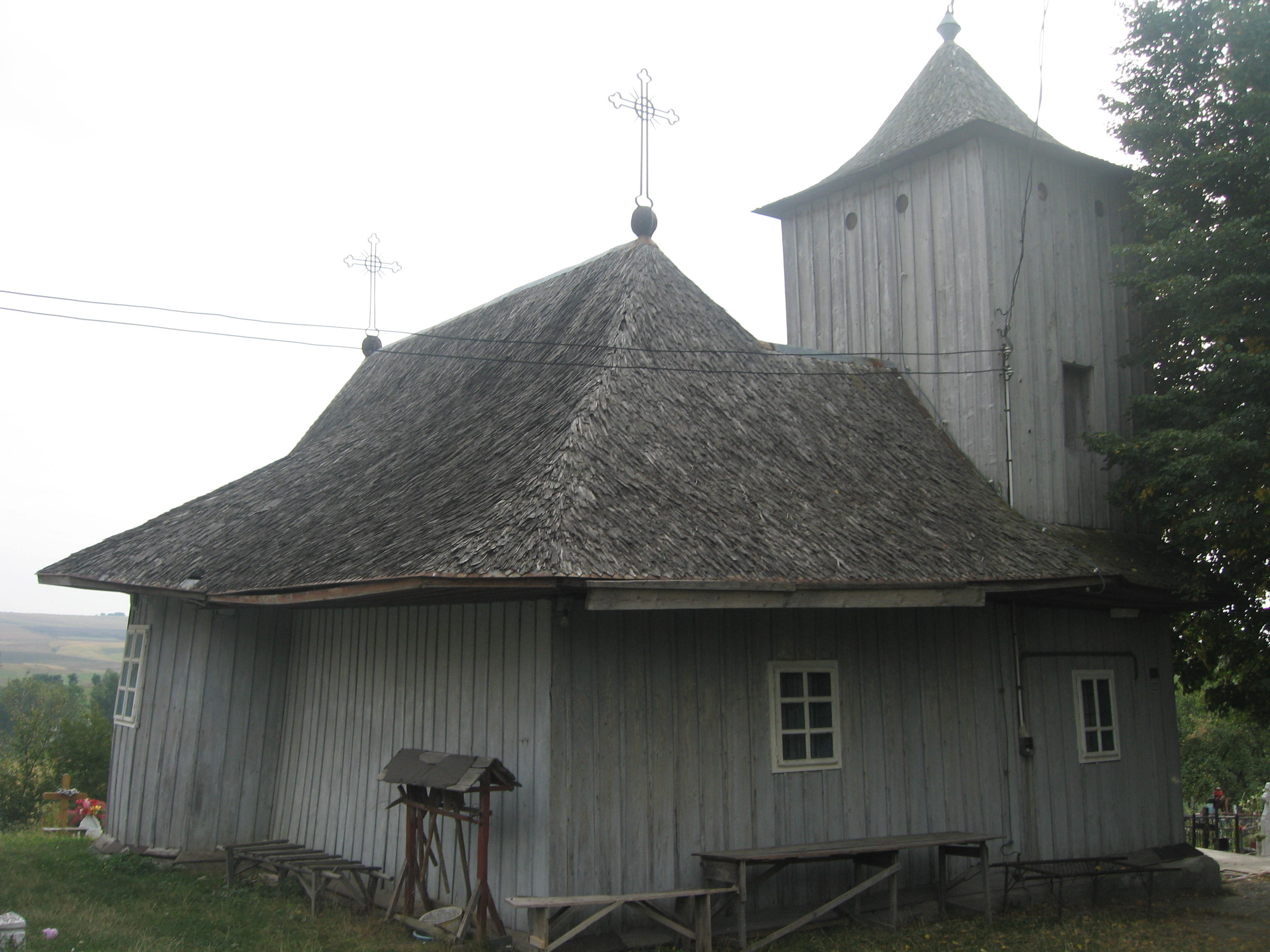
- Wooden church in Forăști

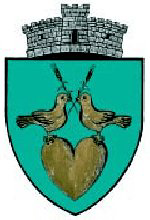
- Coat of arms

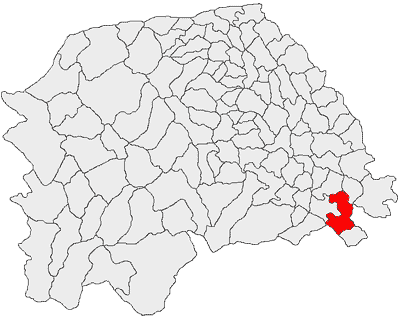
- Location in Suceava County

- Location in Romania
- Coordinates: 47°21′N 26°28′E
- Country: Romania
- County: Suceava

Government
  - Mayor (2020–2024): Brăduț Avrămia (PSD)
- Area: 65.53 km^{2} (25.30 sq mi)
- Elevation: 376 m (1,234 ft)
- Population (2021-12-01): 3,973
  - Density: 60.63/km^{2} (157.0/sq mi)
- Time zone: UTC+02:00 (EET)
  - Summer (DST): UTC+03:00 (EEST)
- Postal code: 727235
- Area code: +(40) 230
- Vehicle reg.: SV
- Website: www.primariaforasti.ro

Forăști is a commune located in Suceava County, Western Moldavia, northeastern Romania. It is composed of nine villages: Antoceni, Boura, Forăști, Manolea, Oniceni, Roșiori, Ruși, Țolești, and Uidești.

The commune is located at the southeastern extremity of Suceava County, 46 km (29 mi) south of the county seat, Suceava, on the border with Neamț and Iași counties. Its neighbors are the following communes: Preutești to the north; Drăgușeni to the south; Tătăruși, Iași and Dolhești to the east; and Drăgănești and Răucești in Neamț County to the west.
