= Miroslovești =

- Commune
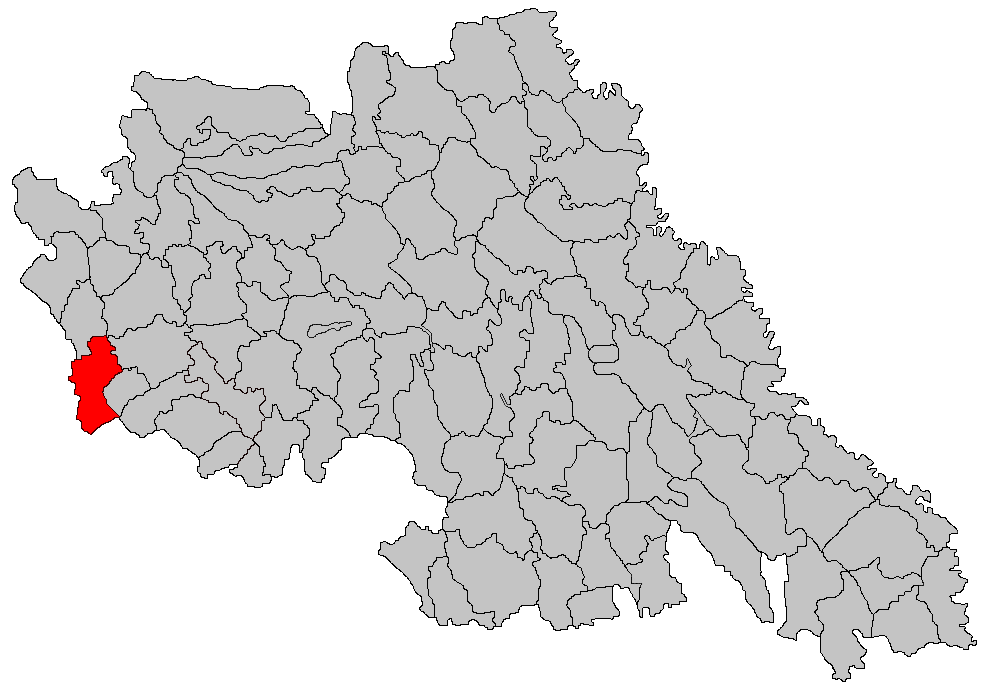
- Location in Iași County

- Location in Romania
- Coordinates: 47°9′N 26°39′E
- Country: Romania
- County: Iași
- Subdivisions: Miroslovești, Mitești, Soci, Verșeni

Government
  - Mayor (2024–2028): Constantin Cojocaru (PSD)
- Area: 45.11 km^{2} (17.42 sq mi)
- Elevation: 279 m (915 ft)
- Population (2021-12-01): 3,534
  - Density: 78/km^{2} (200/sq mi)
- Time zone: EET/EEST (UTC+2/+3)
- Postal code: 707325
- Area code: +(40) x32
- Vehicle reg.: IS
- Website: comunamiroslovesti.ro

Miroslovești is a commune in Iași County, Western Moldavia, Romania. It is composed of four villages: Miroslovești, Mitești, Soci and Verșeni. Ciohorăni was also part of Miroslovești until 2005, when it split away to form a separate commune.
