= Slatina, Suceava =

Slatina
- Commune
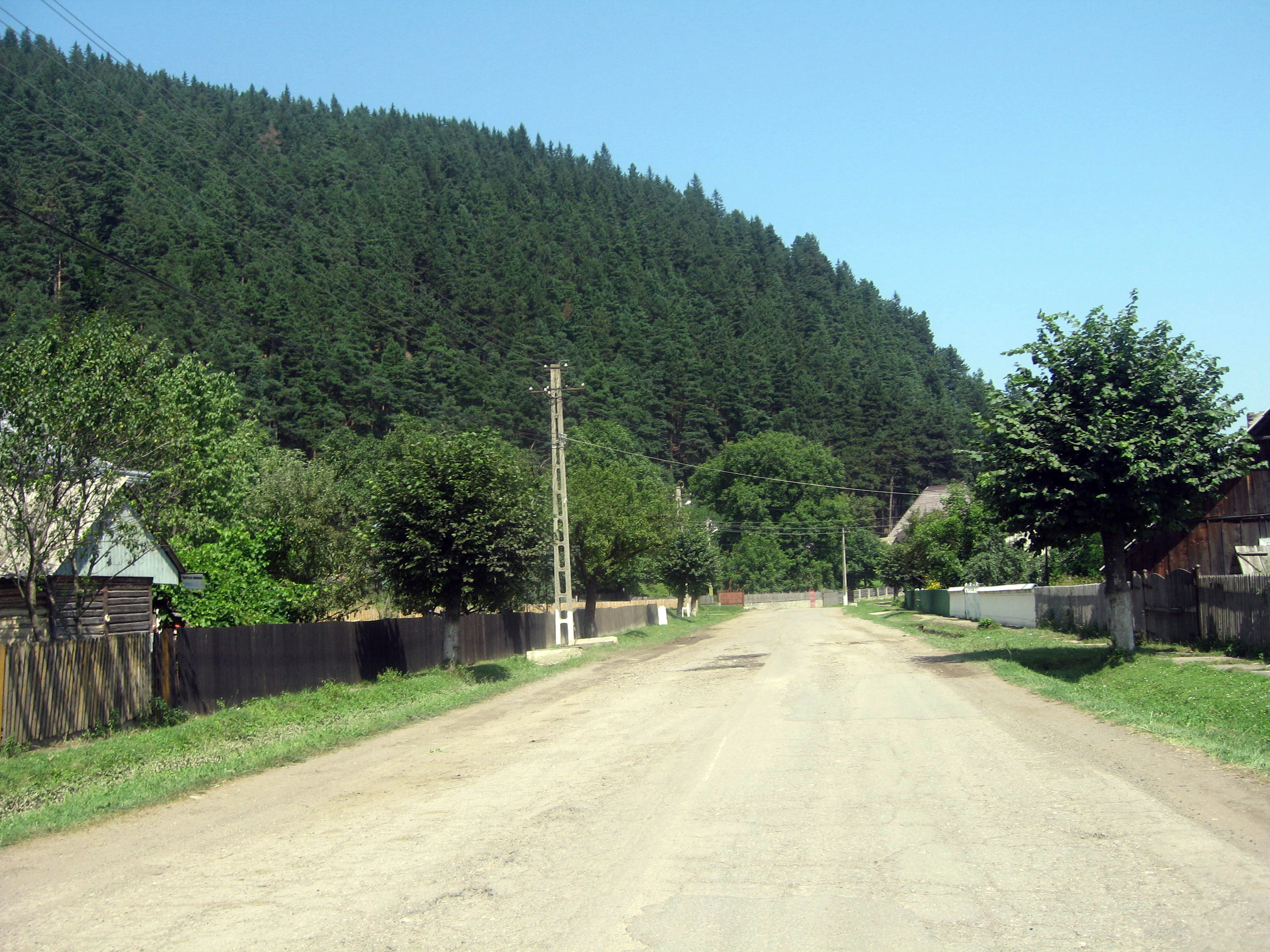
- Rural landscape in Slatina, Suceava county

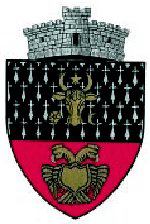
- Coat of arms

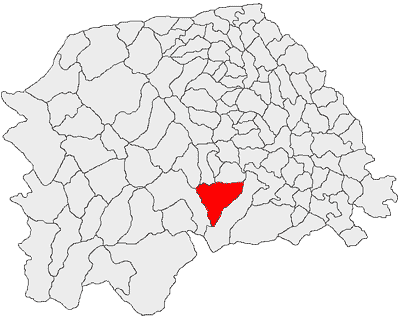
- Location in Suceava County

- Location in Romania
- Coordinates: 47°28′N 26°0′E
- Country: Romania
- County: Suceava
- Subdivisions: Slatina, Găinești, Herla

Government
  - Mayor (2024–2028): Vasile Gherman (PSD)
- Area: 119 km^{2} (46 sq mi)
- Elevation: 467 m (1,532 ft)
- Population (2021-12-01): 4,837
  - Density: 40.6/km^{2} (105/sq mi)
- Time zone: UTC+02:00 (EET)
  - Summer (DST): UTC+03:00 (EEST)
- Postal code: 727490
- Area code: (+40) x30
- Vehicle reg.: SV
- Website: www.comunaslatina.ro

Slatina is a commune located in Suceava County, Western Moldavia, Romania. It is composed of three villages: Găinești, Herla and Slatina.
