= Boroaia =

- Commune
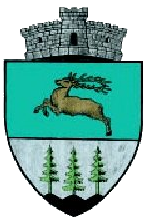
- Coat of arms

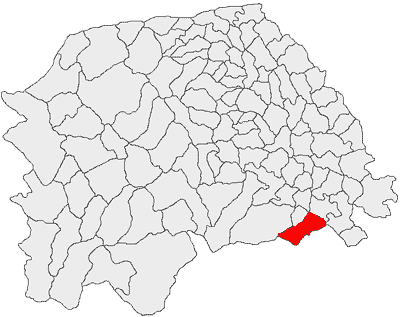
- Location in Suceava County

- Location in Romania
- Coordinates: 47°21′N 26°20′E
- Country: Romania
- County: Suceava
- Subdivisions: Boroaia, Bărăști, Giulești, Moișa, Săcuța

Government
  - Mayor (2024–2028): Vasile Berariu (PSD)
- Area: 73 km^{2} (28 sq mi)
- Elevation: 342 m (1,122 ft)
- Population (2021-12-01): 4,383
  - Density: 60/km^{2} (160/sq mi)
- Time zone: EET/EEST (UTC+2/+3)
- Postal code: 727040
- Area code: (+40) x30
- Vehicle reg.: SV
- Website: www.comunaboroaia.ro

Boroaia is a commune located in Suceava County, Western Moldavia, Romania. It is composed of five villages: Bărăști, Boroaia, Giulești, Moișa and Săcuța.

== Natives ==
- Paul Miron
