= Grumăzești =

- Commune
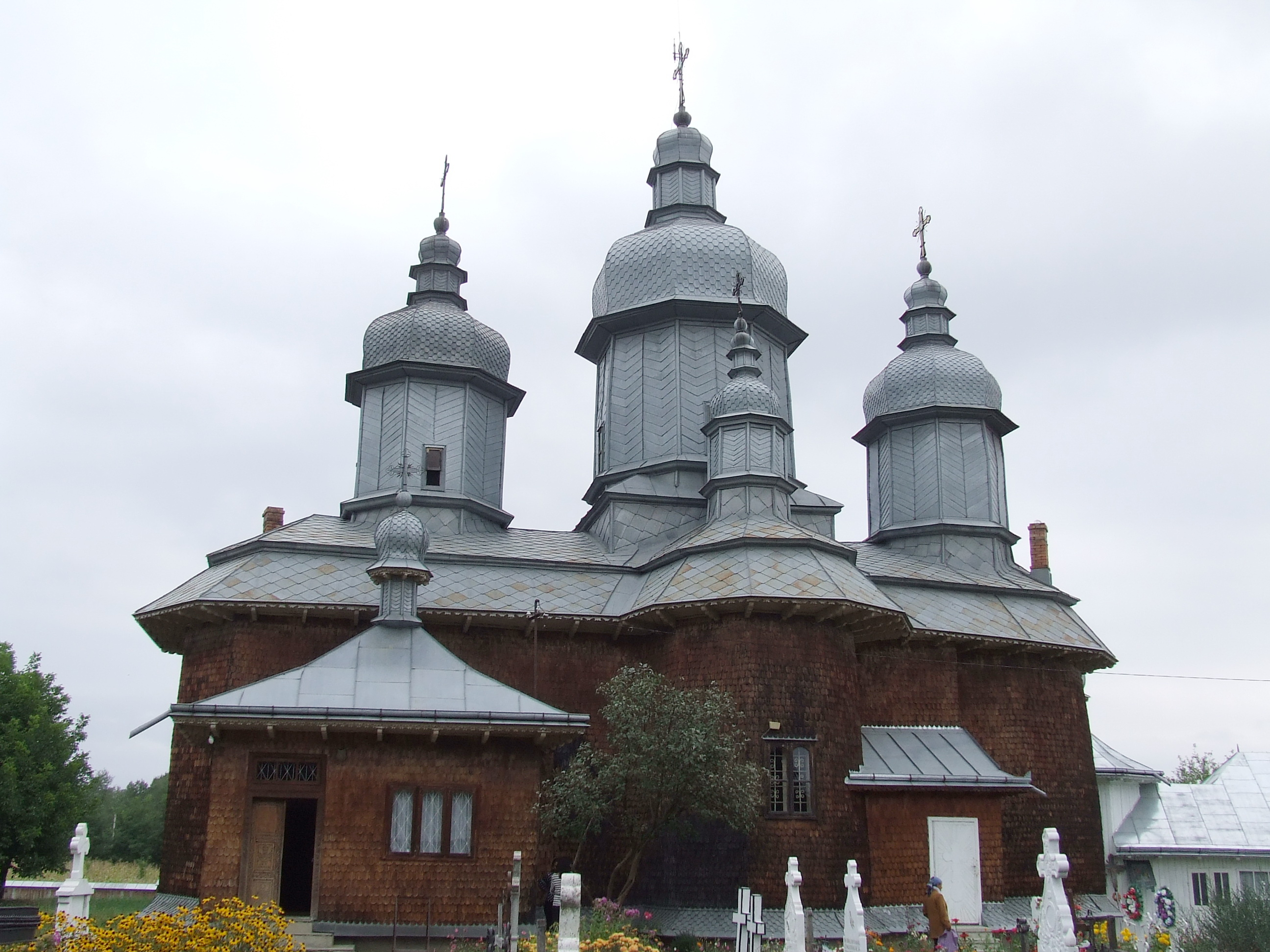
- Wooden church in Topolița

- Location in Neamț County

- Location in Romania
- Coordinates: 47°2′N 26°26′E
- Country: Romania
- County: Neamț
- Subdivisions: Grumăzești, Curechiștea, Netezi, Topolița

Government
  - Mayor (2024–2028): Constantin Matasă (PSD)
- Area: 39.76 km^{2} (15.35 sq mi)
- Elevation: 342 m (1,122 ft)
- Population (2021-12-01): 5,295
  - Density: 133.2/km^{2} (344.9/sq mi)
- Time zone: UTC+02:00 (EET)
  - Summer (DST): UTC+03:00 (EEST)
- Postal code: 617235
- Area code: +(40) x33
- Vehicle reg.: NT
- Website: www.comunagrumazesti.ro

Grumăzești is a commune in Neamț County, Western Moldavia, Romania. It is composed of four villages: Curechiștea, Grumăzești, Netezi, and Topolița.

Historical population
Year	Pop.	±%
1992	5,680	—
2002	5,440	−4.2%
2011	5,182	−4.7%
2021	5,295	+2.2%
Source: Census data
