= Moldova (river) =

River in Romania

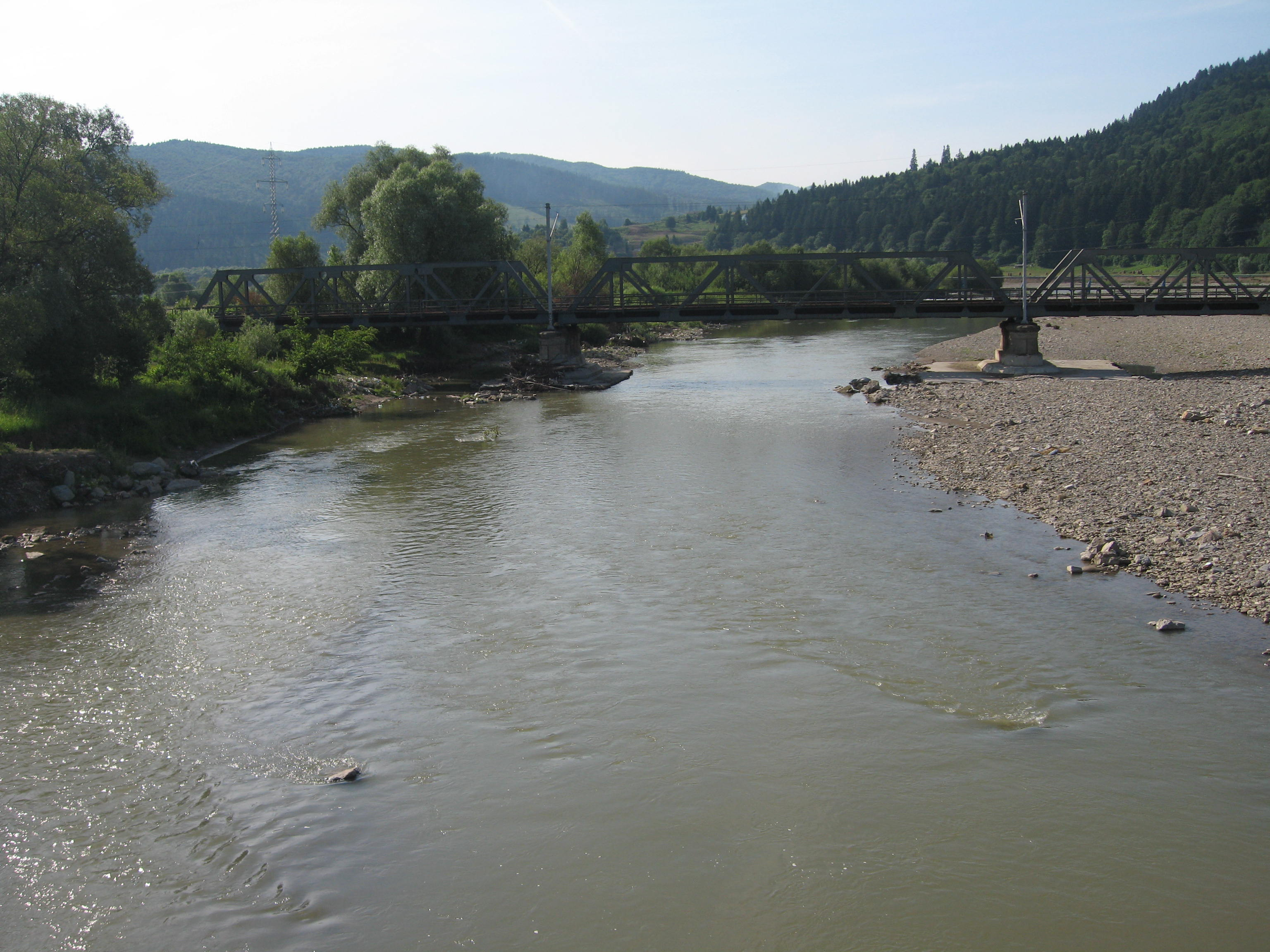
- The Moldova near Gura Humorului

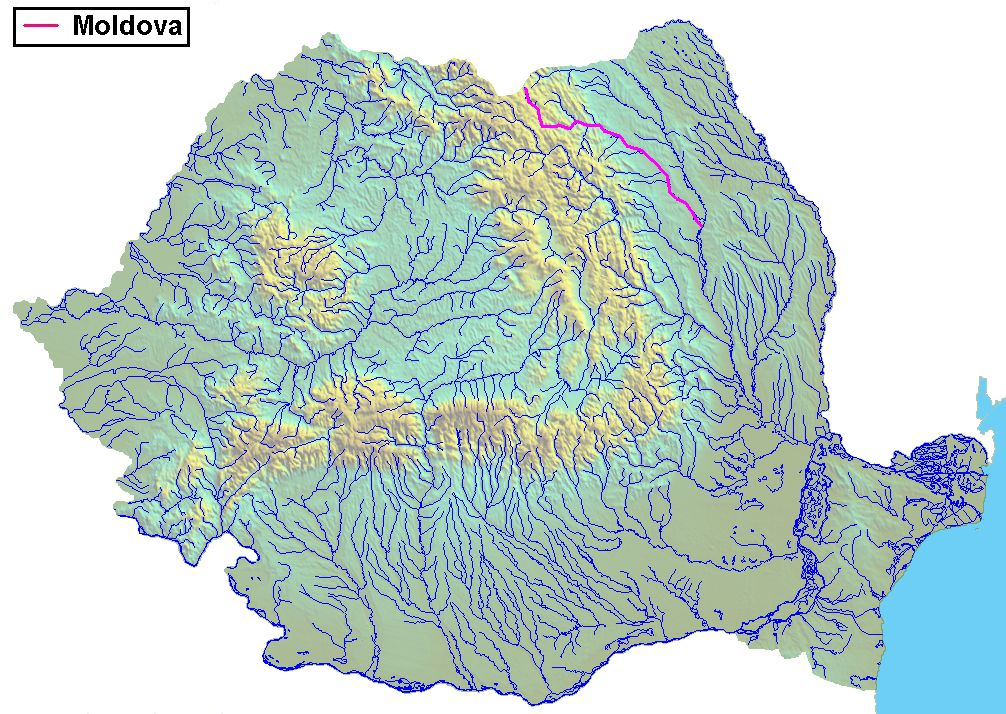
- Course of the Moldova (pink) in Romania

Location
- Country: Romania
- Counties: Suceava, Iași, Neamț
- Towns: Câmpulung Moldovenesc, Roman

Physical characteristics
- Source: Obcina Feredeu Mountains
- Mouth: Siret
  - location: near Roman
  - coordinates: 46°54′11″N 26°58′09″E
- Length: 213 km (132 mi)
- Basin size: 4,299 km^{2} (1,660 sq mi)
- Discharge
  - location: *
  - average: 32 m^{3}/s (1,100 cu ft/s)

Basin features
- Progression: Siret→ Danube→ Black Sea
- Tributaries
  - left: Moldovița
  - right: Neamț

The Moldova (Romanian: Moldova, pronounced [molˈdova]) is a river in Romania, in the historical region of Moldavia. It is a right tributary of the river Siret. The river rises from the Obcina Feredeu Mountains of Bukovina in Suceava County and joins the Siret in Cotu Vameș, east of the city of Roman in Neamț County. The total length of the Moldova from its source to its confluence with the Siret is 213 km (132 mi). Its basin area is 4,299 km^{2} (1,660 sq mi).

The river gave its name to the Principality of Moldavia, whose first capital, Târgul Moldovei (now Baia), is on the Moldova River. The etymology of the name is disputed.

== Towns and villages ==
The following towns and villages are situated along the river Moldova, from source to mouth: Moldova-Sulița, Câmpulung Moldovenesc, Vama, Voroneț, Gura Humorului, Păltinoasa, Baia and Roman.

== Tributaries ==
The following rivers are tributaries to the river Moldova (from source to mouth):

Left: Sulița, Benia, Breaza, Pârâul Negru, Moroșani, Pârâul Cailor, Timoi, Sadova, Deia, Lala, Moldovița, Doabra, Beltag, Tocila, Humor, Bucovăț, Corlata, Șomuz, Medisca, Hatia, Lețcani, Cristești, Boura, Petroaia (or Ciohoranca), Valea Baciului, and Ciurlac.

Right: Lucina, Lucava (or Lucova), Tătarca, Răchitiș, Gârbele, Orata, Delnița, Colac, Arseneasca (or Arseneasa), Putna, Colbul (or Izvorul Giumalăului), Prașca, Seaca, Izvorul Alb, Izvorul Malului, Valea Caselor, Șandru, Sălătruc, Suha, Voroneț, Isachia, Bălăcoaia, Valea Seacă, Suha Mică, Suha Mare, Sasca Mare, Bogata, Râșca, Seaca, Râșca, Sărata, Neamț (or Ozana), Topolița, Umbrari, Valea Albă (or Soci), Valea Mare, and Viar.

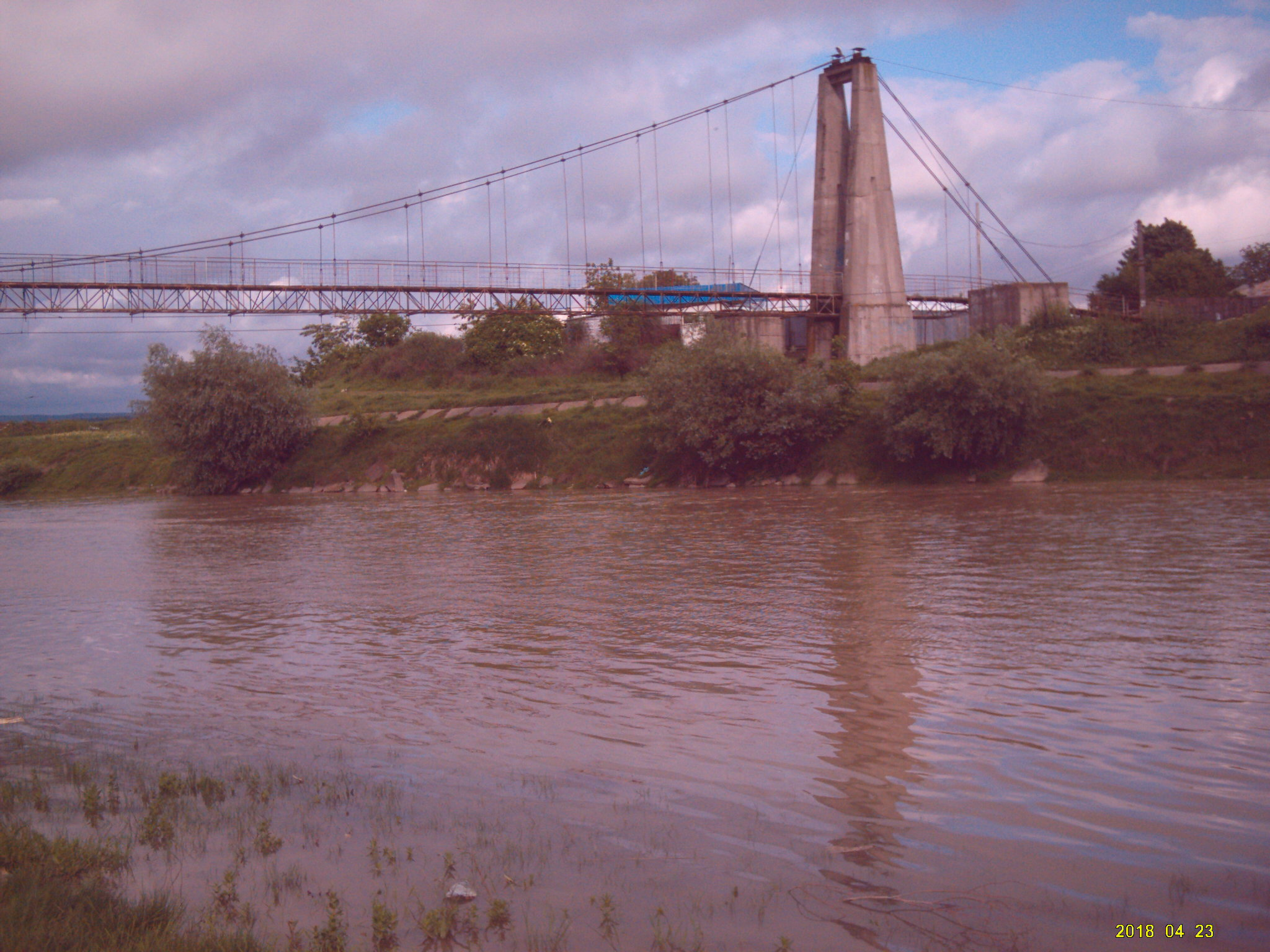
Moldova river near Roman

== Maps ==
- Maps Munceii Neamțului - Munții Stânișoarei
- Tourist map, Parcul Vânători-Neamț
