= George Enescu National University of Arts =

University in Iași, Romania

- Universitatea Națională de Arte „George Enescu”
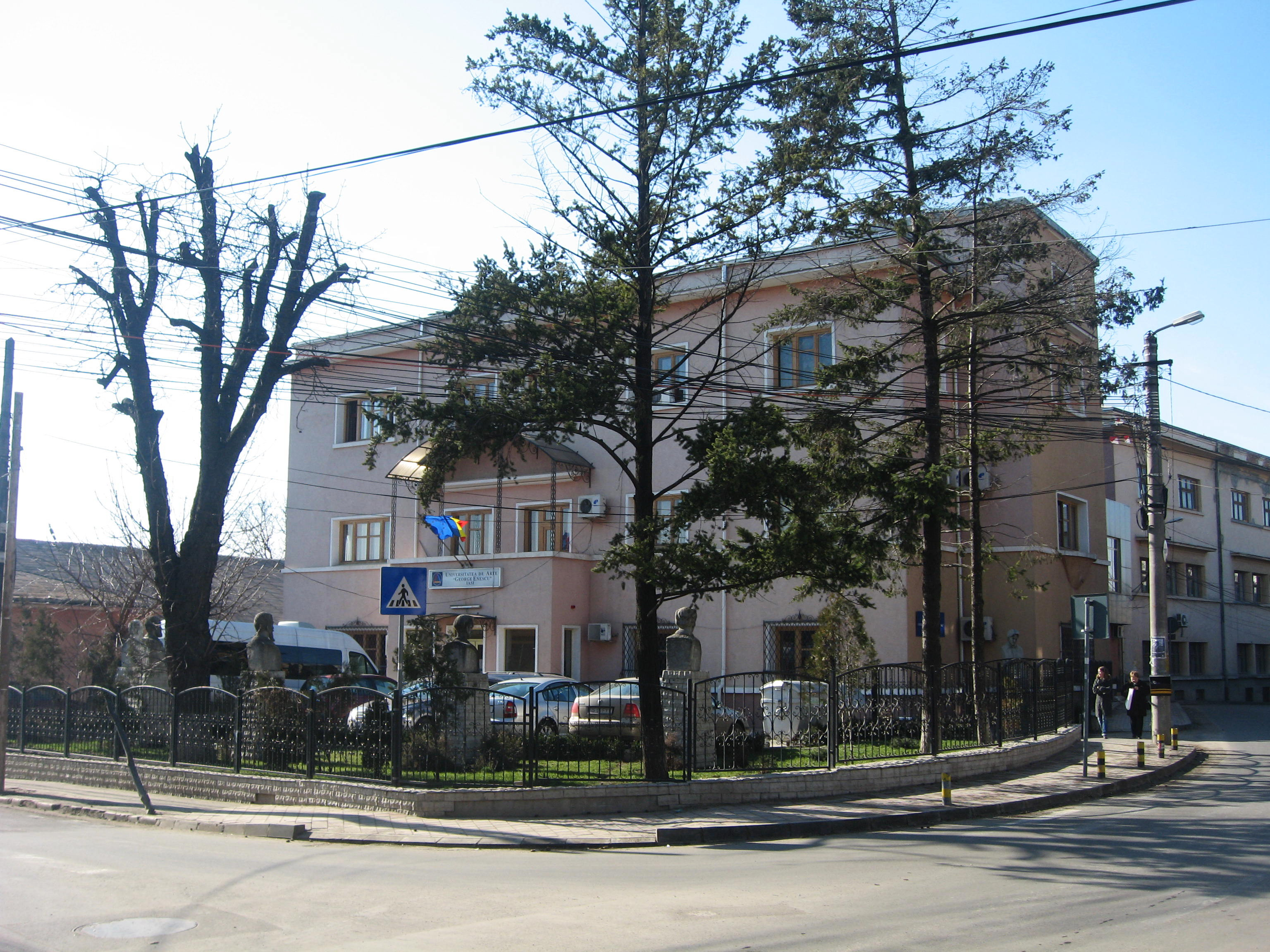
- Former names: George Enescu Conservatory, George Enescu Academy of Art
- Type: Public
- Established: 1860; 166 years ago
- Rector: Aurelian Bălăiță
- Faculty: 134
- Students: 1,276
- Undergraduates: 1,026
- Postgraduates: 250
- Location: Iași, Romania; 47.1645°N 27.5777°E
- Website: www.arteiasi.ro
- Location within Romania

The George Enescu National University of Arts (Romanian: Universitatea Națională de Arte „George Enescu”) is a public university in Iași, Romania, founded in 1860. It was named in honor of the composer George Enescu.

== History ==
The institution was established on 1 October 1860, as the Music and Declamation School, by decree of Prince Alexandru Ioan Cuza, followed 26 days later, by the foundation of the School for Sculpture and Painting. In October 1864, Cuza approved the Charter for the Music and Declamation Conservatory and the Charter for the National Schools of Fine Arts (establishing the departments of painting, sculpture, gravure, architecture and the art of landscape architecture).

In 1931, the Conservatory and the School of Fine Arts became the Academy of Music and Dramatic Art of Iași, which soon adopted the name George Enescu, and the Iași Academy of Fine Arts, respectively.

After World War II, under the communist regime, the two academies were integrated as the George Enescu Conservatory. Having reverted to the name George Enescu Academy of Art, the institution was regrouped, in 1992, to focus on visual arts, theatre, and music. In 1997, its current name, George Enescu University of Arts, was adopted.

== Structure ==
Faculties

- Faculty of Music Performance, Composition, and Music Studies
- Theatre Faculty
- Faculty of Visual Arts and Design

== Professors and alumni ==
- Călin Alupi
- Corneliu Baba
- Octav Băncilă
- Mansi Barberis
- Anda-Louise Bogza
- Ștefan Ciubotărașu
- Octavian Cotescu
- Hariclea Darclée
- Ștefan Dimitrescu
- Petre Hârtopeanu
- Ion Irimescu
- Ernest Maftei
- Gabriela Manole-Adoc
- Ion Mateescu
- Nelly Miricioiu
- Mihai Nechita
- Octavian Nemescu
- Gheorghe Panaiteanu Bardasare
- Elise Popovici
- Camil Ressu
- Didia Saint Georges
- Constantin Daniel Stahi
- Achim Stoia
- Nicolae Tonitza
- Tudor Zbârnea

== See also ==
- Iași "Moldova" Philharmonic Orchestra
- Iași Romanian National Opera
