= Mesteacăn =

Mesteacăn ("birch") may refer to several places in Romania:

- Mesteacăn, a village in Corni Commune, Botoșani County
- Mesteacăn, a village in Cornereva Commune, Caraș-Severin County
- Mesteacăn, a village in Văleni-Dâmbovița Commune, Dâmbovița County
- Mesteacăn, a village in the city of Brad, Hunedoara County
- Mesteacăn, a village in Răchitova Commune, Hunedoara County
- Mesteacăn, a village in Valea Chioarului Commune, Maramureș County
- Mesteacăn, a village in Icușești Commune, Neamț County
- Mesteacăn, a village in Halmeu Commune, Satu Mare County
- Mesteacăn, a tributary of the river Fiad in Bistrița-Năsăud County

== See also ==
- Mesteacănu (disambiguation)
