= Raluca Nagy =

Romanian anthropologist, writer

Raluca Nagy (born 1979) is a Romanian anthropologist and writer. She works at the University of Sussex, and is an associate lecturer at Hokkaido University in Japan. She has published two novels, the second of which was Romania’s finalist for the 2022 European Union Prize for Literature, and a memoir.

== Life ==
Nagy was born in Cluj-Napoca. She obtained a bachelor's degree in economics from ASE Bucharest, a masters in cultural anthropology from SNSPA Bucharest, and doctorates in anthropology from Université libre de Bruxelles (ULB; 'Free University of Brussels') and sociology from SNSPA Bucharest. She did her postdoctoral research at Waseda University in Japan. She teaches at the University of Sussex, and is an associate lecturer at Hokkaido University in Japan.

Nagy has published two novels to date. Her first, Un cal într-o mare de lebede ('A Horse in a Sea of Swans') was nominated for the Festival du Premier Roman de Chambéry, and won the Sofia Nădejde and Observator Cultural debut awards. Her second, Teo de la 16 la 18 ('Teo from 16 to 18') published in 2021, was shortlisted for the Sofia Nădejde prize and was Romania’s finalist for the 2022 EU Prize for Literature.

Nagy has also spent time living in Belgium and in Vietnam. She was in Vietnam during the COVID-19 pandemic, and ended up extending her stay to two years because of it. In the book Despre memoriile femeii si alti dragoni (About a Woman's Memories and Other Dragons), published in 2024, she contrasts her childhood living in communist Romania with that in the Vietnamese communist regime.

Nagy co-founded a flash-fiction platform, Laconic, which aims to promote Romanian literature. Her stories have been published in various volumes such as Scrisori din Cipangu. Povestiri japoneze de autori români (Trei, 2016).

== Works ==
- Despre memoriile femeii si alti dragoni (About a Woman's Memories and Other Dragons, 2024)
- Un cal într-o mare de lebede ('A Horse in a Sea of Swans', 2018)
- Teo de la 16 la 18 ('Cleo from 16 to 18', 2021) –
