= Almaș (Cracău) =

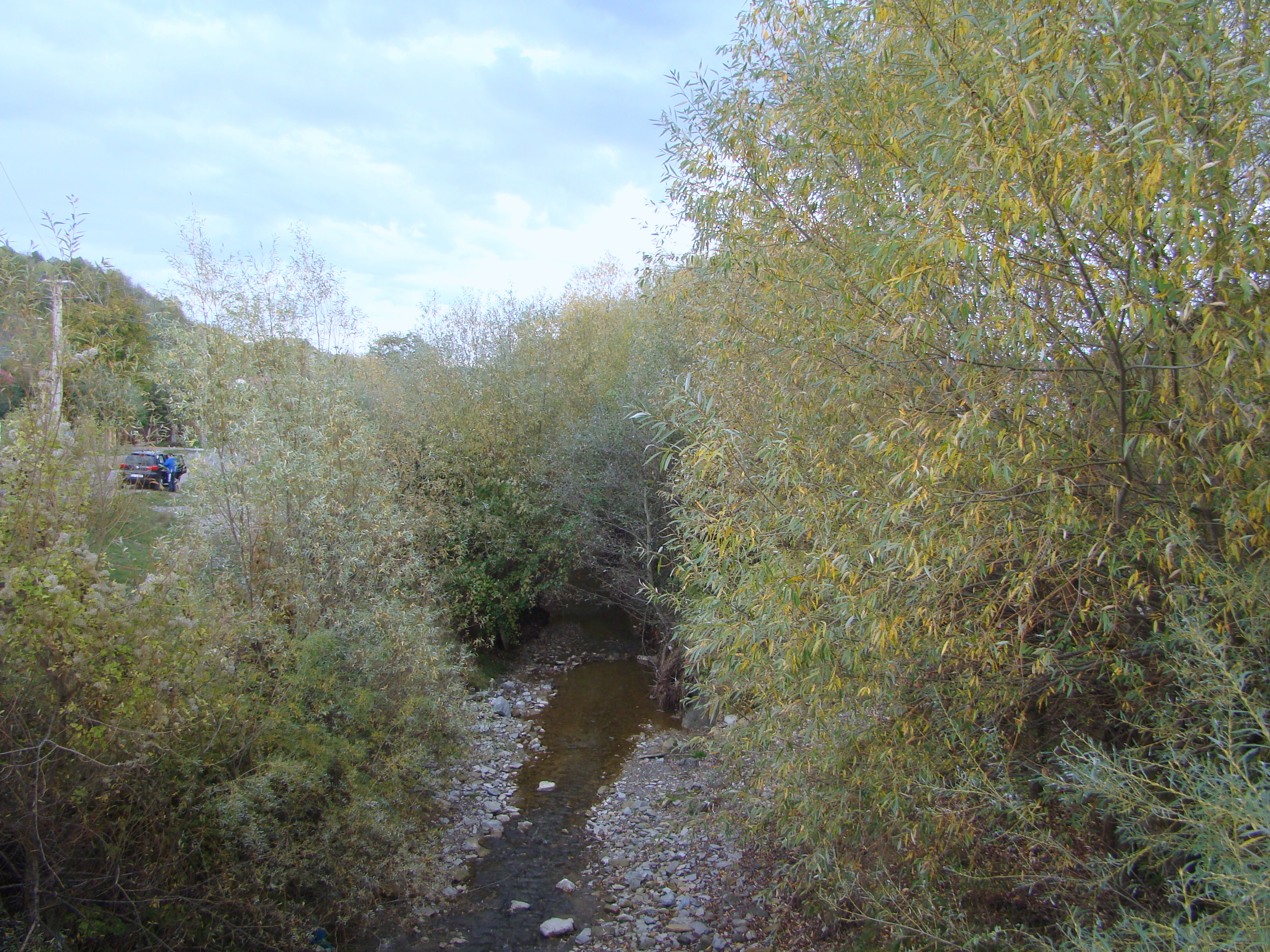

- Location within Romania

Location
- Country: Romania
- Counties: Neamț County
- Villages: Almaș, Dobreni

Physical characteristics
- Mouth: Cracău
  - coordinates: 46.9897°N 26.4654°E
- Length: 22 km (14 mi)
- Basin size: 86 km^{2} (33 sq mi)

Basin features
- Progression: Cracău→ Bistrița→ Siret→ Danube→ Black Sea
- Tributaries
  - left: Ulmul, Horăița
- River code: XII.1.53.60.4

The Almaș is a right tributary of the river Cracău in Romania. It flows into the Cracău near Verșești. Its length is 22 km (14 mi) and its basin size is 86 km^{2} (33 sq mi).
