= Constantin Daniel Stahi =

Romanian painter (1844–1920)

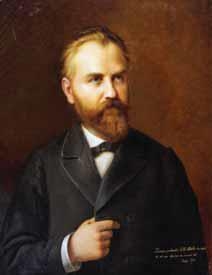
- Self-portrait
- Born: November 14, 1844; Dobreni, Neamț County, Principality of Moldavia
- Died: June 18, 1920 (aged 75); Iași, Kingdom of Romania
- Resting place: Eternitatea Cemetery, Iași
- Education: Gheorghe Panaiteanu Bardasare; Gheorghe Șiller
- Known for: painting, drawing, gravure, woodcut

Constantin Daniel Stahi (14 November 1844 – 18 June 1920) was a Romanian painter and gravure artist.

== Biography ==
Born in Dobreni, Neamț County, Stahi attended school first in Piatra Neamț (1850–1854) and then at the Socola Monastery (1854–1857). In 1862 he entered the National School of Fine Arts from Iași, where he was taught by Gheorghe Panaiteanu Bardasare and Gheorghe Șiller. He continued his artistic education at the Academy of Fine Arts in Munich, where, from 1871 to 1878, he studied painting, metal gravure, and xylography.

Stahi painted still life paintings representing small objects that were surrounding him, such as old books, newspapers, religious items, chairs, shoes, plates, and especially fruits. Also, he painted many portraits of famous people of his time (for example Gheorghe Asachi, painted in 1881). Many other of his paintings take inspiration from the simple life in the countryside in idyllic compositions and by painting peasants having as models people living in Bavaria and Moldavia regions.

Beside his artistic career, he was a professor and, later on, the headmaster of the National School of Fine Arts in Iași between 1892 and 1902, following Gheorghe Panaiteanu Bardasare. One of his students there was Octav Băncilă.

He died in his house on Bărboi street in Iași on 18 June 1920 and was interred at the city's Eternitatea Cemetery.

== Gallery ==
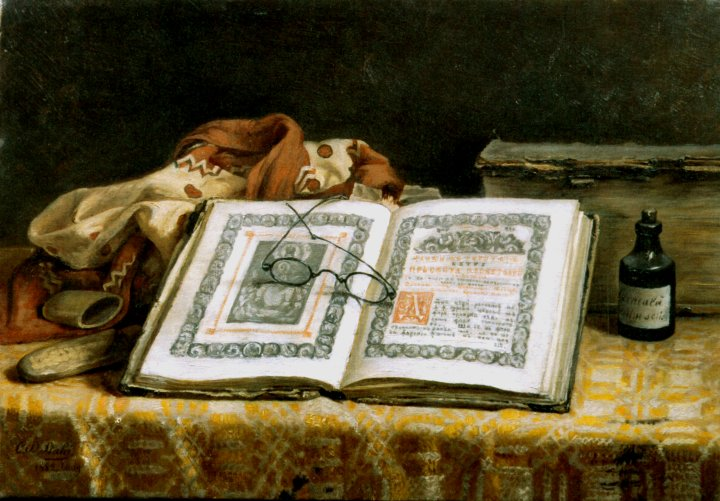
Still life with a book and glasses (1882)

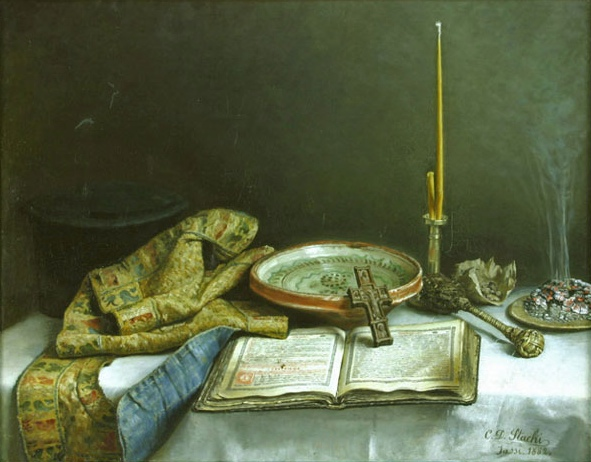
Holy water (1882)

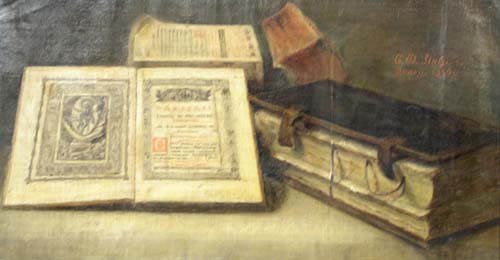
Religious books

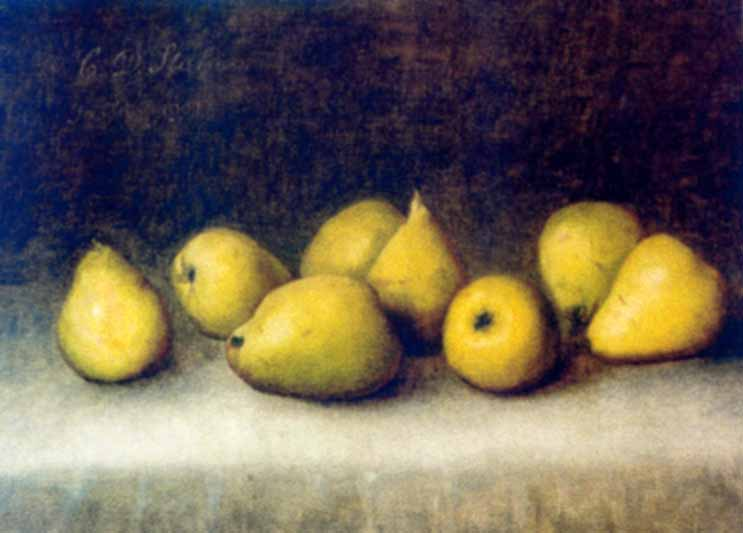
Pears (1901)

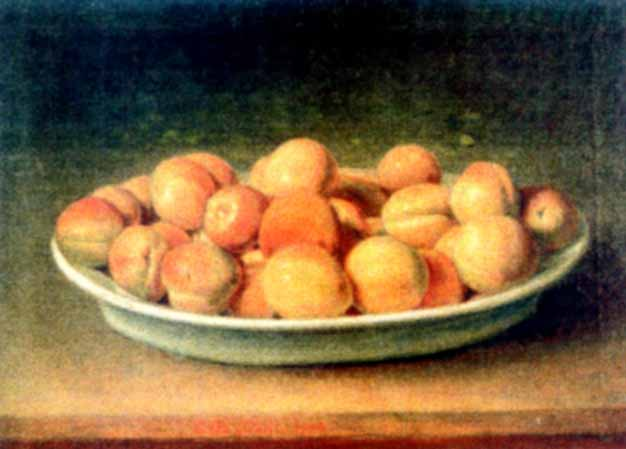
Still life (1908)
