= Călin Alupi =

Romanian painter (1906–1988)

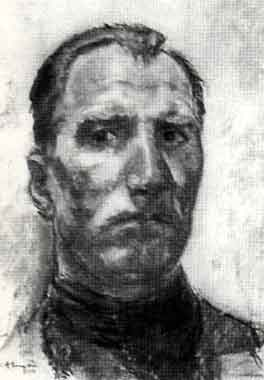
Călin Alupi – Self Portrait

Călin Alupi (July 20, 1906 – September 19, 1988) was a Romanian Post-Impressionist painter, cited along with Corneliu Baba and Alexandru Ciucurencu as one of the greatest Romanian painters of the period.

== Biography ==
Alupi was born in Vancicăuții Mari, at the time in the Bessarabia Governorate, the son of two peasants, Teodor and Antonina Alupi. His father died in World War I, while fighting in Galicia as a soldier in the Imperial Russian Army. Călin Alupi attended high school in Șendriceni, where his desire to paint was sparked at age 13 by his teacher, Nicolae Popovici Lespezi. In 1925 he entered the School of Fine Arts in Iași, where he was mentored by Ștefan Dimitrescu. By 1933 he began to exhibit his work, both individually and with other painters. When Nicolae Tonitza was commissioned to decorate the Durău Monastery, he chose Alupi, together with Corneliu Baba and Mihai Cămăruț to be part of his group of apprentices.

After World War II broke out, he was conscripted in 1940 and posted to the front line, where he remained until 1944, when he returned by foot from Odessa. In 1945, lieutenant in reserve Alupi was awarded the Order of the Crown of Romania, Knight rank. In 1947 he became a professor at the School of Fine Arts in Iași and married Sanda Constantinescu Ballif. Their daughter, Antonina, who was born in 1950, also became a painter. He died in Iași, at age 82 and was buried in the city's Eternitatea Cemetery.

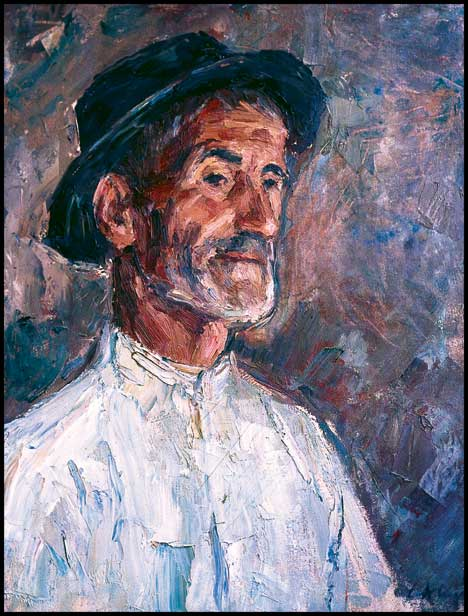
Moș Androne, 1972

In March 2010, the City Hall of the 5th arrondissement of Paris hosted the Sinceritate Exhibition, the first large exhibition of Călin Alupi in France, with about 100 paintings presented.

== Paintings in public collections ==
Pictures of these paintings can be seen in the online catalogue raisonné.

=== Russia ===
==== Saint Petersburg, Hermitage Museum ====
- 1965, Golia Monastery, oil on canvas 59 × 62.5 cm, visible in the permanent collection (room 429 of the General Staff Building which hosts the famous impressionists' collection of the museum)

=== France ===
==== Nice, Musée des Beaux-Arts ====
- circa 1956, Antonina, oil on cardboard, 42 × 33.5 cm

==== Deauville, "Les Franciscaines" museum ====
- 1984, White horses in the meadows, pastel, 44 × 63 cm

=== Romania ===
==== Bucharest ====
===== Charcoal =====
- before 1978, Boilermaker, 30 × 23.5 cm
- avant 1978, Machinist milling, 23.5 × 30 cm

===== Pastel =====
- 1948, Women from the Maramureș at Work in the Field, 30 × 24 cm
- 1953, For Peace, 57.5 × 47 cm
- 1953, Poet Mihai Codreanu, 61 × 49 cm
- 1953, Poet Mihai Codreanu (profile), 61 × 49 cm
- 1954, Painter Octav Băncilă's House, 47.5 × 70 cm
- Before 1956, Campina Refinery, 51.5 × 64.5 cm
- 1956, Girl Portrait - Popovici, 51.5 × 64.5 cm
- 1960, The Ruins of Old Rodna Fortress, 76 × 56.5 cm
- poate 1960-61, Workers at an oil well, 50 × 70 cm
- 1975, Visitors at Râșnov Fortress, 61.5 × 50 cm
- 1975, Medieval Walls, 61.5 × 50 cm
- 1977, Copou Gardens, 43 × 57 cm

===== Oil =====
- 1946, Houses along a construction field, 66 × 78 cm
- poate 1950, Turdaș Peasant, 43 × 37 cm

===== National History Museum of Romania =====
- 1946-47, Old Iasi Corner, oil on cardboard, 50 × 36 cm

===== Parliament of Romania =====
- perhaps 1982, Lane to Neamț Monastery, oil, 50 × 62.2 cm
- pearhaps 80's, Bunch of flowers with red berries on a green background, oil on cardboard, 60 × 71 cm
- perhaps 80's, Hlincea Landscape (or Dobruja?), pastel, 41 × 54.5 cm

==== Iași ====
===== Drawing =====
- Before 1956, Painter drawing, charcoal and chalk, 67.2 × 50 cm
- 1957 or 1963, The Woman who inspired Rebreanu's character "Ana" in his novel "Ion", aged 75 (her real name is Rodovica Boldijer), colored drawing, 28 × 19 cm

===== Pastel =====
- 1949, Cetățuia Belltower, 29.5 × 22 cm
- 1949, Young woman's head, 23 × 17 cm
- 1952, Amidst Bucium Vignards, 46 × 62 cm
- 1954, Portrait of a Korean Student, 55.5 × 44.3 cm
- 1955, Comrade Mititelu - Workshop CFR - Ilie Pintilie, 56.5 × 48 cm
- 1957, The Model, 65 × 50 cm
- 1958, Twilight, 51 × 62 cm
- 1962, Abrud Landscape, 68 × 50 cm
- 1962, Street view in Abrud, 70 × 50 cm
- 1965, House in a vineyard (brigade post #1 Bucium, 50 × 69 cm
- 1977, House amidst gardens - Bucium, 41 × 59 cm
- 1984, Horse in the landscape, 48 × 61 cm

===== Oil =====
- 1934, Portretul lui Emanoil Bardasare, 76 × 62 cm
- 1934, Portrait of an old man, 70.5 × 50 cm
- 1939, Tuberoses, 70 × 52 cm
- Before 1946, Nocturne (Between the buildings), 67 × 47 cm
- 1947, Winter - Underwear hanging on a clothline, 49 × 36 cm
- 1948, Study (1907), 86 × 100 cm
- 1956, Tătărași landscape (Iasi-Prut pipe yard), 84 × 110 cm
- 1963, Portrait in blue, 83 × 66 cm
- Before 1967, Sentinel in post, 44 × 33 cm
- 1967, Sadoveanu House, 63 × 79 cm
- Maybe 70's, Young redhead woman in a green dress
- 1973, Ghelari Church in the mist, 50 × 70 cm
- 1974, Self-portrait, 65 × 54 cm
- 1976, House in Corni, 51 × 68 cm
- 1977, "1907" Series - The Gendarmes come into the Village, 64 × 79 cm
- 1977, Winter in Bucharest (dusk between the buildings), 96 × 74 cm

===== The Ilisei Collection at the Frumoasa Monastery, Iași =====
- Perhaps 80's, Flowers - cold harmony, pastel, 51.5 × 41 cm
- Perhaps 70's, Isolated mansion before the storm, oil on cardboard, 50 × 62 cm
- Perhaps 80's, Chrysanthemums, oil on cardboard, 50 × 38 cm

===== National Literature Museum in Iasi =====
- circa 1934, Actor Miluță Gheorghiu, oil on cardboard

==== Bacău ====
===== Regional Art Museum =====
- 1963, Landscape with a bull, oil on cardboard, 49.5 × 61.5 cm
- Before 1964, Portrait of a female student, oil on canvas, 70 × 53.5 cm
- Before 1967, Writer Demostene Botez, oil on canvas, 75.5 × 55.5 cm

===== House for Culture =====
- Study (woman's head)
- 1961, The miner's son, oil on cardboard, 62 × 47 cm, signed upper right in white

==== Fălticeni ====
===== „Ion Irimescu” Art Museum =====
- 1949, Mariana, pastel, 26 × 18 cm, signed lower right
- 1960, The Ranger's daughter, pastel, 45 × 34 cm

===== Museum Corner Grigore Ilisei (at the town library „Eugen Lovinescu”) =====
- 1987, Ecaterina, dark sanguine, 25 × 20 cm

==== Piatra Neamț, Regional Art Museum ====
- poate 1958, Bistrița Landscape, oil on cardboard, 54 × 70 cm

==== Suceava, Bukovina Museum ====
- 1949, Knitting, pastel, 35 × 25.5 cm
- 1974, Ciprian Porumbescu's Village, pastel, 48 × 64 cm
- Before 1965, Female Worker, oil on cardboard, 40.5 × 32 cm

==== Botoșani, Regional Art Museum ====
- Portrait - Ant Sofia, oil on cardboard, 61 × 45 cm
- Still Life with vegetables, oil on cardboard, 50 × 70 cm
- 1947-48, Locomotive engineer, oil on cardboard, 19 × 17 cm
- Before 1960, The Poiana Câmpina Workshops, pastel, 65 × 51 cm
- Before 1960, Neamț Monastery Tower, pastel, 66 × 50.5 cm, in the permanent collection of the Ștefan Luchian Museum of Ștefănești
- 1985, Industrial Landscape - CUG factory in Iasi, pastel, 80 × 62 cm

==== Brăila, Regional Art Museum ====
- 1953, Washerwoman with laundry, pastel, 66 × 52 cm

==== Bistrița-Năsăud, Liviu Rebreanu Memorial Museum ====
- maybe after 1956, Ion's Hotplates in a country house (L. Rebreanu museum in Prislop), pastel, 38 × 28 cm
- 1957 or 1963?, Rodovica Boldijer, the Woman who inspired Rebreanu's character "Ana" in his novel Ion, aged 75, oil on canvas, 55 × 42 cm

==== Baia Mare, Regional Art Museum ====
- Glade, oil on cardboard, 49 × 69 cm
- Portrait of a woman with a blue beret, oil on cardboard, 53.3 × 40 cm

==== Unidentified Romanian Museum or Institute ====
- 1971, Sanda reading, pastel, 31 × 27 cm, former SCCE collection (Socialist Counsel for Culture and Education). The paintings of the SCCE have been sent to various Romanian museums during the 80's.
- 1974, Tulcea, oil on canvas, 46.5 × 60.5 cm, ex-CCES too. These two paintings were reproduced in the Catalogue of the Bucharest National Museum solo exhibit of 1978.
- Before 1979, Portrait of a man with beard and mustache, oil on cardboard, 35 × 33 cm, a file with description and blur black & white picture can be found on the site culturalia.ro. This painting was in Câmpulung Muscel in 1979.

== Gallery ==
Works by Călin Alupi

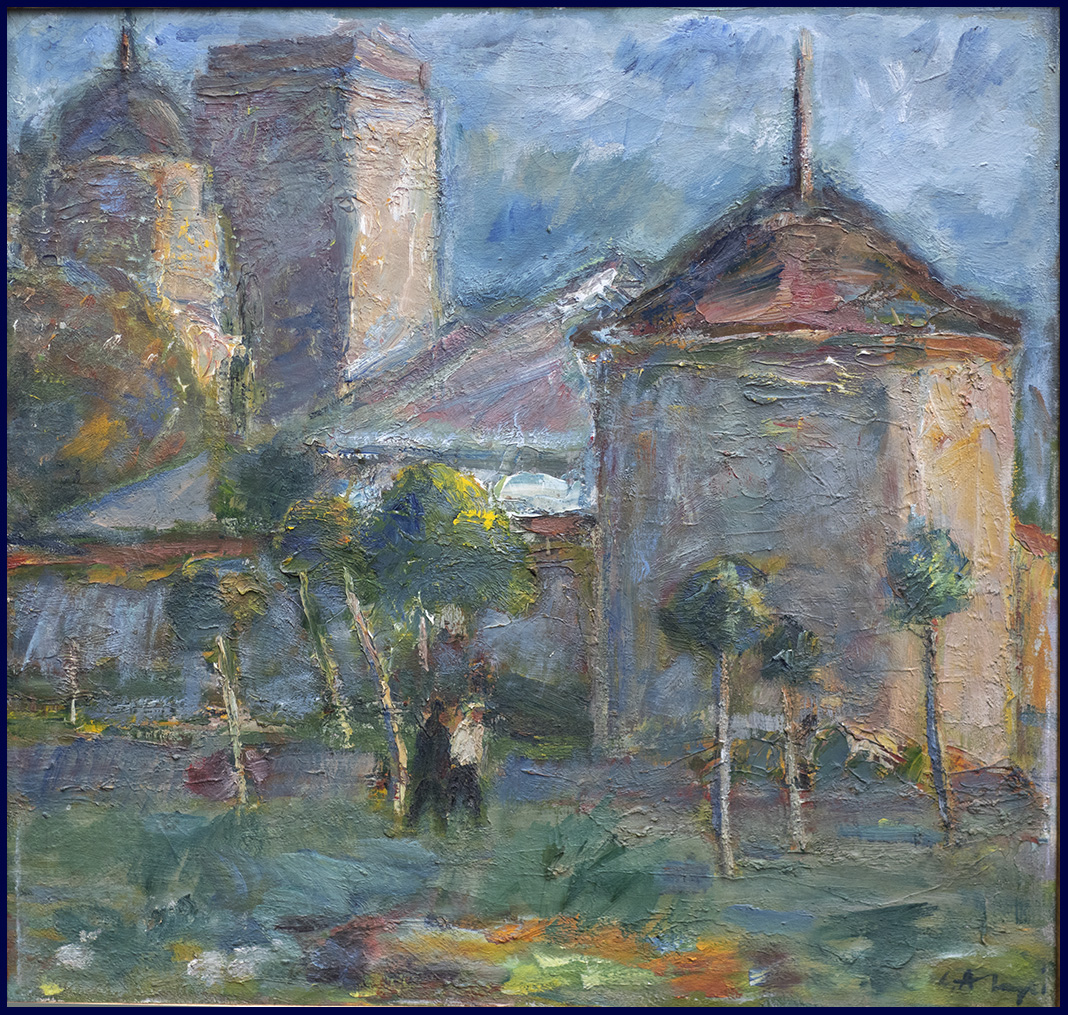
Golia Monastery (1965), oil on canvas, 59 × 62.5 cm, Saint Petersburg, Russia, Hermitage Museum

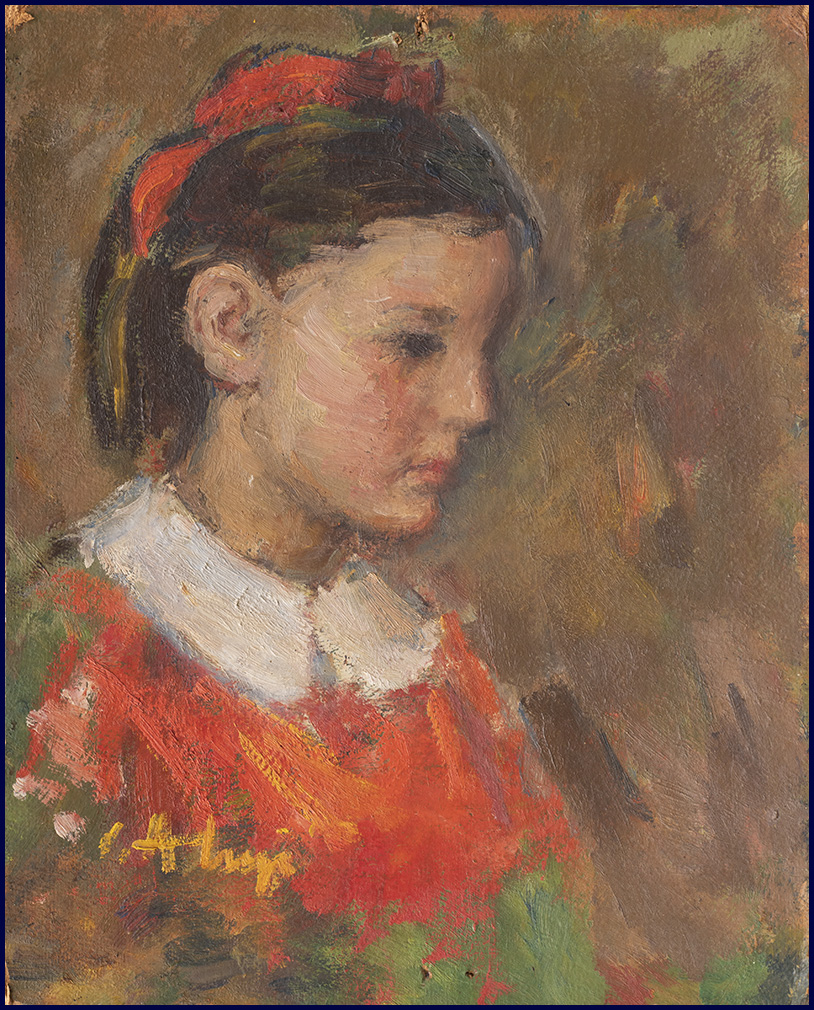
Antonina (about 1956), oil on cardboard, 42 × 33.5 cm, Nice, France, Musée des Beaux-Arts
