= Horăița =

- Location within Romania

Location
- Country: Romania
- Counties: Neamț County
- Villages: Poiana Crăcăoani, Negrești

Physical characteristics
- Mouth: Almaș
  - location: Dobreni
  - coordinates: 47.0019°N 26.4420°E
- Length: 19 km (12 mi)
- Basin size: 48 km^{2} (19 sq mi)

Basin features
- Progression: Almaș→ Cracău→ Bistrița→ Siret→ Danube→ Black Sea
- Tributaries
  - left: Silvestru
  - right: Măngălaru, Călugărul, Botolia

The Horăița is a left tributary of the river Almaș in Romania. It flows into the Almaș near Dobreni. Its length is 19 km (12 mi) and its basin size is 48 km^{2} (19 sq mi).
