= Mesteacănu =

Mesteacănu may refer to several places in Romania:

- Mesteacănu, a village in Almașu Commune, Sălaj County
- Mesteacănu, a village in Vizantea Livezi Commune, Vrancea County
- Mesteacănu, a tributary of the river Lotru in Vâlcea County

== See also ==
- Mesteacăn (disambiguation)
