= Tudor Zbârnea =

Moldovan painter

Tudor Zbârnea OR
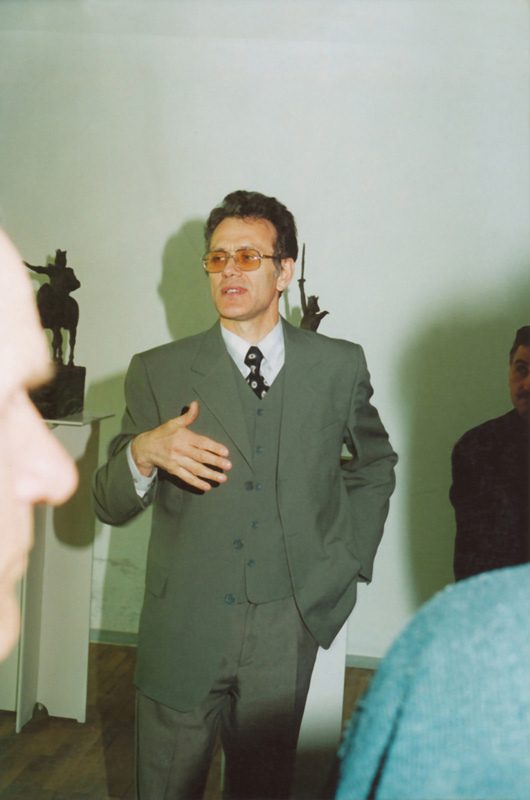
- Zbârnea in the 1990s
- Born: 29 December 1955; Nisporeni, Moldavian SSR, Soviet Union
- Education: George Enescu National University of Arts
- Known for: Painting

Tudor Zbârnea (born 29 December 1955) is a Moldovan painter.

Zbârnea has contributed to the assertion, in Chișinău, of an original artistic thinking stream that was against "artistic vigilance" mentality, which was too hostile to the spectacular innovations in plastic art. Currently, he is the director of the National Museum of Fine Arts of Moldova. He participated as chairman or member of the juries in various national and international competitions in the field of fine arts. He traveled on studies and documentaries in Germany, Italy, Turkey, Georgia, Russia, France, the Netherlands, Belgium, Switzerland, Poland, Austria.

He is the author and curator of the visual art projects such as:

- "Neighbors from the East", Utrecht, The Netherlands, 2006;
- "Moldova, Contemporary Art" – Brussels, Belgium, 2006;
- Curator of the International Painting Biennial, Chișinău, 2009, 2011, 2013.

== Studies and education ==
He is a graduate of the Republican College of Fine Arts "Ilya Repin" from Chișinău and from the George Enescu National University of Arts in Iași, the painting division of the Faculty of Fine Arts, in Professor Corneliu Ionescu’s class. The member of the Union of Artists of Moldova. Member of the Romanian Artists' Union. Member of IAA (UNESCO). The member founder of the "Group of ten".

== Exhibitions ==
In 1984, he debuted in a republican exhibition of contemporary art organized in Chișinău. He has participated in over 300 exhibitions organized in the country and abroad. To date he has had over 30 personal exhibitions in Belgium, Belarus, France, Italy, Moldova, Romania, Ukraine, Russia, and numerous relevant collective exhibitions in Belgium, Cyprus, Finland, France, Georgia, Germany, the Netherlands, Italy, Lithuania, Russia, Turkey and Poland.

== Awards and prizes ==
He is a winner of numerous prizes, medals, trophies and other mentions at different international and national art competitions and salons, among them:

- The Prize of the Union of Artists of Romania, 2015;
- The Prize of the Bacău City Hall, awarded for the "Salons of Moldova", 2015;
- National Award, granted by the Government of the Republic of Moldova, for outstanding merits in the arts development arts awarded in 2014;
- Ministry of Culture Award, National Art Competition, Chișinău, 2010;
- Grand Gold Medal, M. C. A. at the Cannes International Prestige Grand Prix, 2009, 2010;
- Honorary Master of Arts, 2009; Vicolo Poldo Trophy, 35th Edition, Como, Italy, 2009;
- The prize of the Union of Artists of Moldova, 2001, 2008;
- The Prize of the Union of Artists of Romania, 2007;
- Diploma of the Ministry of Culture, National Competition in the field of Fine Arts, Chișinău, 2009, 2008, 2005;
- Silver medal "Eureca" World Show (Brussels), 1998;
- Honorary Diploma of the Flemish Artists (Brussels), 1998;
- Honorary Diploma of the European Academy of Art, Brussels, 1997.

== Collection works ==
The artist's works are exhibited in several museums:

- The National Museum of Art of Moldova;
- National Museum of Contemporary Art, Bucharest, Romania;
- State Museum of Art, Ankara, Turkey;
- National Museum of Art, Beijing, China;
- The Art Museum, Baia Mare, Romania;
- The Art Museum, Bacău, Romania;
- Museum of Art, Prahova County, Romania;
- Cluj-Napoca Art Museum, Romania;
- Brukenthal National Museum, Sibiu, Romania;
- Crișurii Country Museum, Oradea, Romania;
- Museum of Comparative Art, Sângeorz-Băi, Romania;
- Belarus National Museum of Art, Minsk;
- National Museum of Art, Bishkek, Kyrgyzstan;
- Museum of History and Art, Bacău, Romania;
- A.Mateevici Museum, Căinari, Moldova;
- The Contemporary Art Collection of the Romanian Ministry of Culture;
- The collection of the Parliament of the Republic of Moldova;
- The collection of the Union of Artists of Moldova;
- The collection of the Romanian Embassy in Moldova;
- AgroindBank Moldova Collection;
- Collection of the STURZA Family Foundation;
- The Cannes Public Collection;
- Capo d'Orlando Public Collection, Italy;
- Private collections in Australia, Austria, Belgium, Cyprus, Finland, France, Italy, Israel, Germany, Lithuania, Moldova, Netherlands, Russia, United States, Turkey, Venezuela, and other countries.

== Critics ==
"Tudor Zbârnea's painting belongs in all its details to the true Romanian tradition, but it can be seen that in depths of his feeling, in the depths of his artistic thinking, these genes, these canons of Romanian colorism were inherited from father to son, from ancient times, for that Tudor Zbârnea is, above all, a colorist. [...] His work is a consolidated painting, a thoughtful painting, a painting that renews. Tudor Zbârnea's paintings are characteristic of two fundamental features of the Romanian school: firstly, a coherent, lucid construction, a very well thought out color distribution on the surface of the painting, and, secondly, an accurate understanding of the color function. Color is not just a matter of hastening a soul meeting - but more importantly - color clearly characterizes an attitude towards art: art that remains, above all, a way of the world understanding and to explain and communicate it to the viewer. It is well known that the painting is not a chatter of some colors on the canvas, but the clear, rational and intelligible dialogue among different colored surfaces. Tudor Zbârnea is a representative of the Romanian art school sensitivity, which still has its roots in the painting of the Moldavian monasteries and which continues through great painters of the 19th and 20th centuries. Through all its essential components - spirituality, sensitivity and plastic thinking - Tudor Zbârnea's paintings belong to this great school."

Dan Grigorescu, Bucharest, 1995.

***

"Zbârnea deliberately cultivates the equivocation and the gloom, the neutral observation and its own projection, not so much as to create states of insecurity in the exercise of reading, but to understand what are the mechanisms by which matter is organized and the spiritual task over-determines the world of substance. He starts from the premise of the genuine creator who, in a moment of clairvoyance, has the intuition of a harmony beyond the senses that must be transferred from the virtuality into the act or, in other words, from the latent existence in the manifest of the reality. After this long negotiation with the delusions of the form, with the chromatic matter and with its consubstantial light, a new age of the image seems to set itself. The mist of ambiguity dissipates, the color leaves the practice of its own confession, the image diverges from the context and the eye begins to discern and recognize objects, faces, events and episodes isolated from a narrative covered by oblivion. What was originally a story about the birth of form (the world) in a generic version and under a globalizing view, now becomes an eposome of the form (world) ready made. Tudor Zbârnea follows this odyssey of creation both from the perspective of the witness fascinated by the miracle and overwhelmed by his greatness, as well as from the creator himself whose gesture mixes the tenderness and the harshness, the paternal love and the lucidity of the master."

Pavel Șușară, Bucharest, 1998.
