= Octav Băncilă =

Romanian artist (1872–1944)

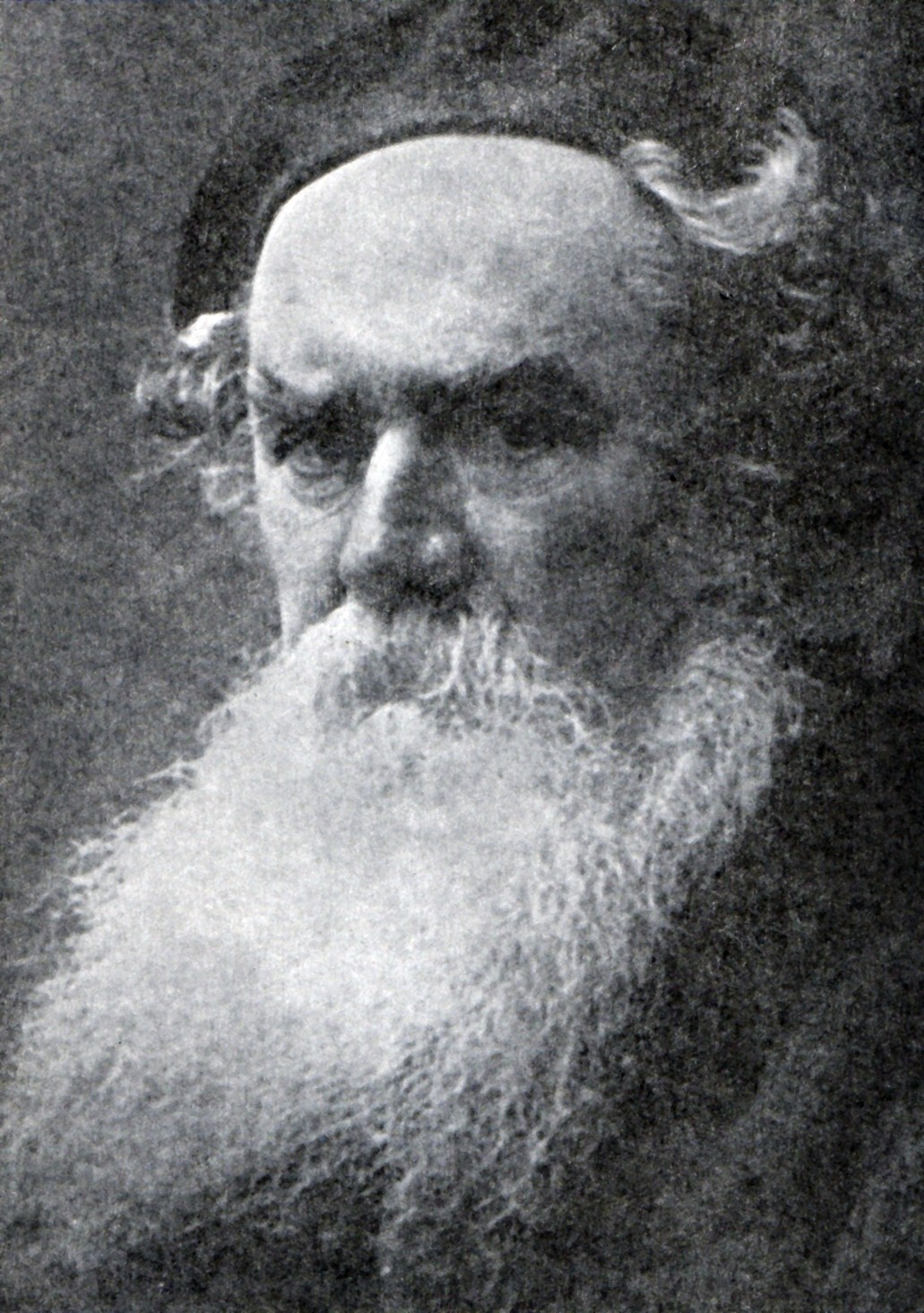
- Born: 4 February 1872; Corni, Botoșani, Romania
- Died: 3 April 1944 (aged 72); Bucharest, Romania
- Education: Gheorghe Panaiteanu Bardasare; Constantin Daniel Stahi
- Known for: Painting
- Movement: Realism
- Relatives: Sofia Nădejde

Octav Băncilă (Romanian pronunciation: [okˈtav bənˈt͡ʃilə]; 4 February 1872 – 3 April 1944) was a Romanian realist painter and left-wing activist. He was the brother of Sofia Nădejde, a feminist journalist, and the brother-in-law of Ioan Nădejde (an atheist and socialist thinker, editor of the magazine Contemporanul).

== Biography ==
Born in Botoșani, he remained an orphan at age 4, and was raised in Iași by his much older sister and her husband, who first encouraged Octav's talent and passion for art. After completing primary school, he entered the Fine Arts School in Iași, where he was taught by Gheorghe Panaiteanu Bardasare, Constantin Daniel Stahi, and Emanoil Bardasare, graduating in 1893. Between 1894 and 1897, he lived and studied abroad on a scholarship: first in Italy and France, and finally in Germany, where he studied under Nicholaos Gysis at the Akademie der Bildenden Künste in Munich (it is not known whether he ever graduated).

Upon his return, he attempted to open a studio in downtown Iași, but financial constraints forced him to settle on the outskirts; it was during that time that Băncilă began exploring his major themes: the lives of peasants, factory workers, impoverished Jewish traders and artisans, conscripted soldiers, and of nomadic Roma people. After 1901, he taught calligraphy and art in primary schools in the city. Impressed by the outcome of the 1905 Revolution in the Russian Empire, he was soon active in socialist circles, and became an acquaintance of major intellectual figures on the Left, including Gala Galaction and Paul Bujor.

In 1907, following the crushing of the Romanian peasants' revolt, Băncilă began traveling the country and attempting to gather evidence of government repression and violence. The result was a series of twelve paintings (not all of them surviving), including his famous figure of an old peasant standing open-armed (titled Înainte de 1907, "Before 1907"), several images of dead bodies piled up in fields (being looked on by soldiers), and the eponymous 1907, depicting three ragged peasants running into rifle fire.

Following the outbreak of World War I, he became involved in pacifist causes, using his work to comment on the results of conflict. In 1916, he was appointed professor at the Fine Arts School in Iași (a position he kept until his retirement in 1937). With Constantin Ion Parhon and Bujor, Băncilă founded, in 1919, the short-lived Laborer Party (Partidul Muncitor), soon fused into the Peasants' Party.

He remained critical of social and political developments inside Greater Romania, was supportive of strike actions in the Jiu Valley, and used his art to attack anti-Semitic trends in Romanian society. Towards the end of his life, he began to sympathise with communism (he was not, however, affiliated with the Communist Party of Romania). Băncilă died in 1944 in Bucharest, at age 72. A street in Iași now bears his name.

== Gallery ==
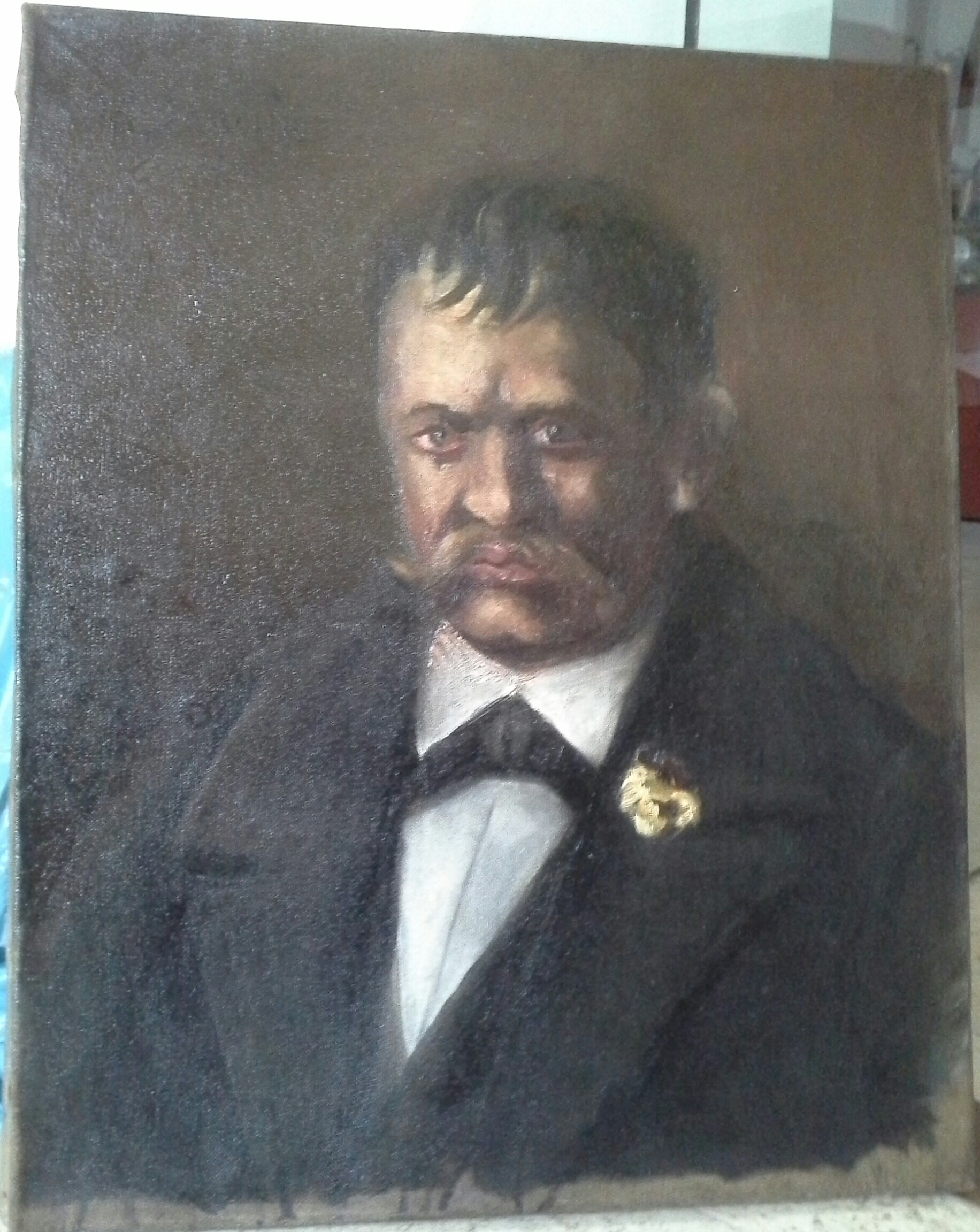
Vasile (Basil), the butler of the Arizan household, 1897

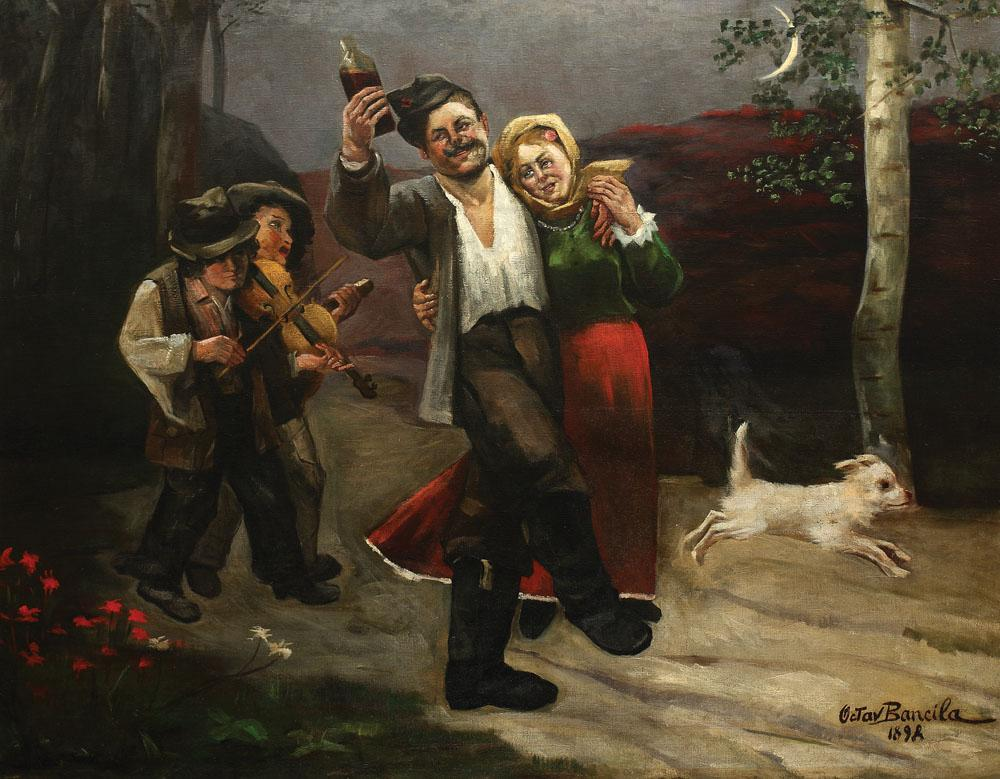
End of Leave, 1898

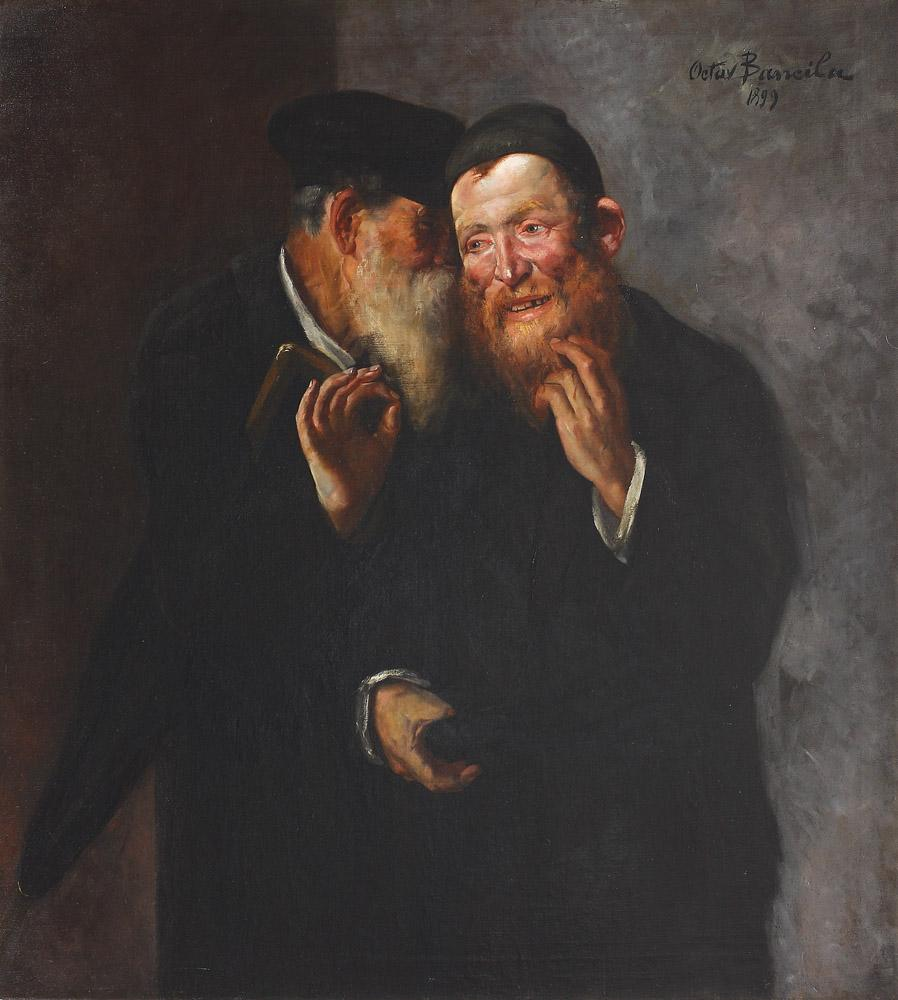
Good Deal, 1899

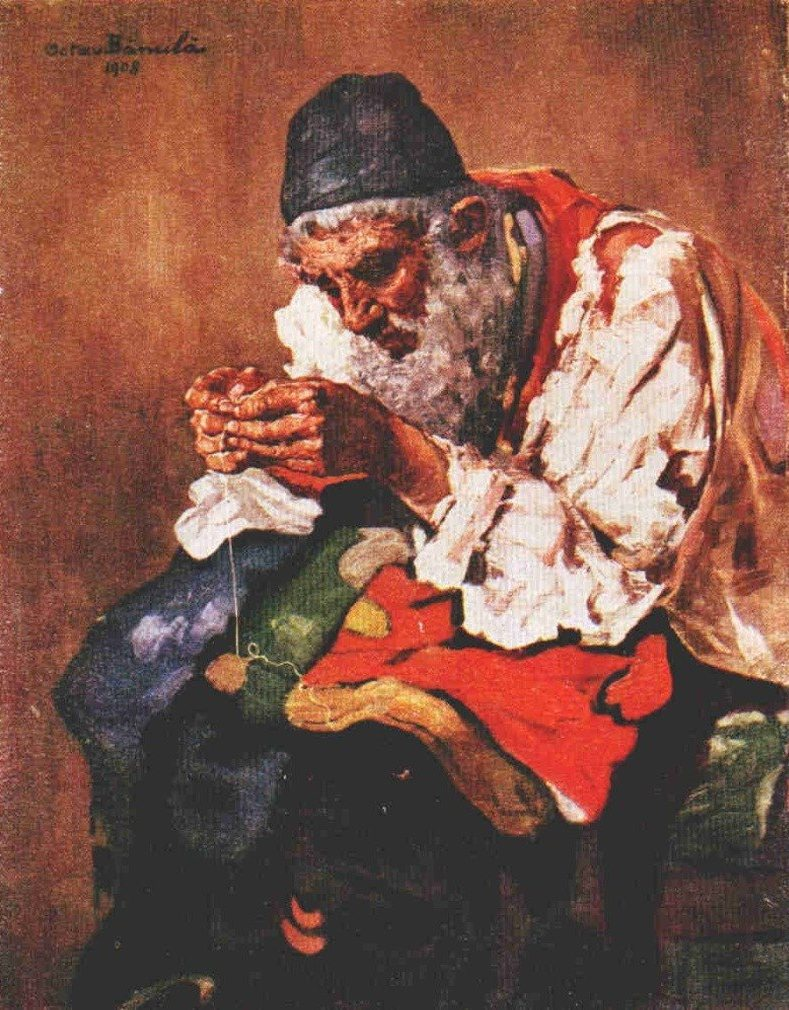
Rag Picker, 1908

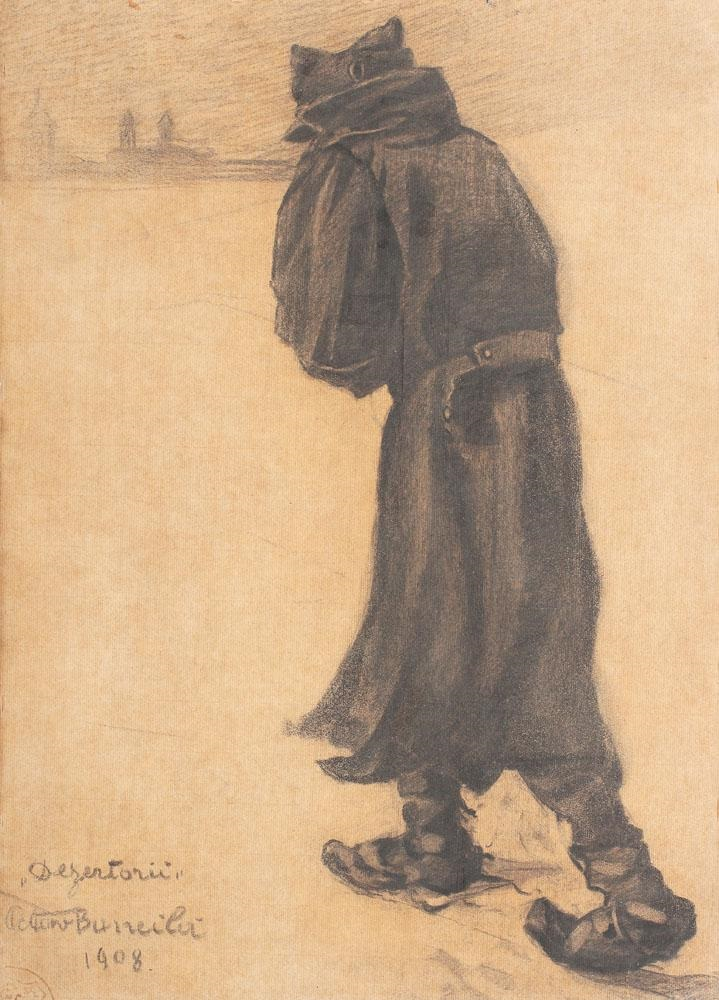
Deserter, 1908

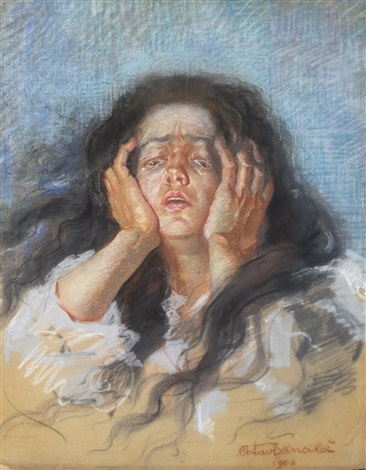
Woman Portrait, 1908

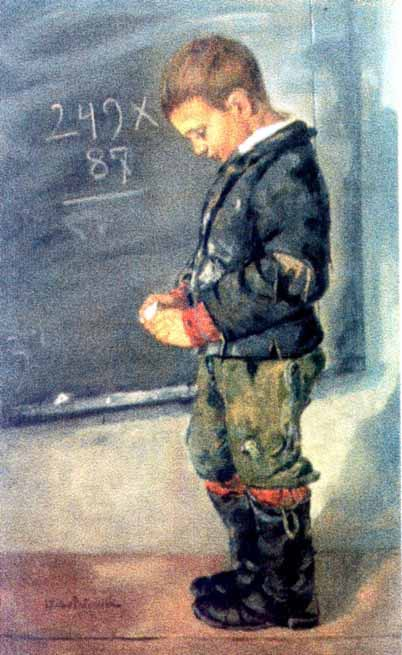
Lost in Calculations, 1909

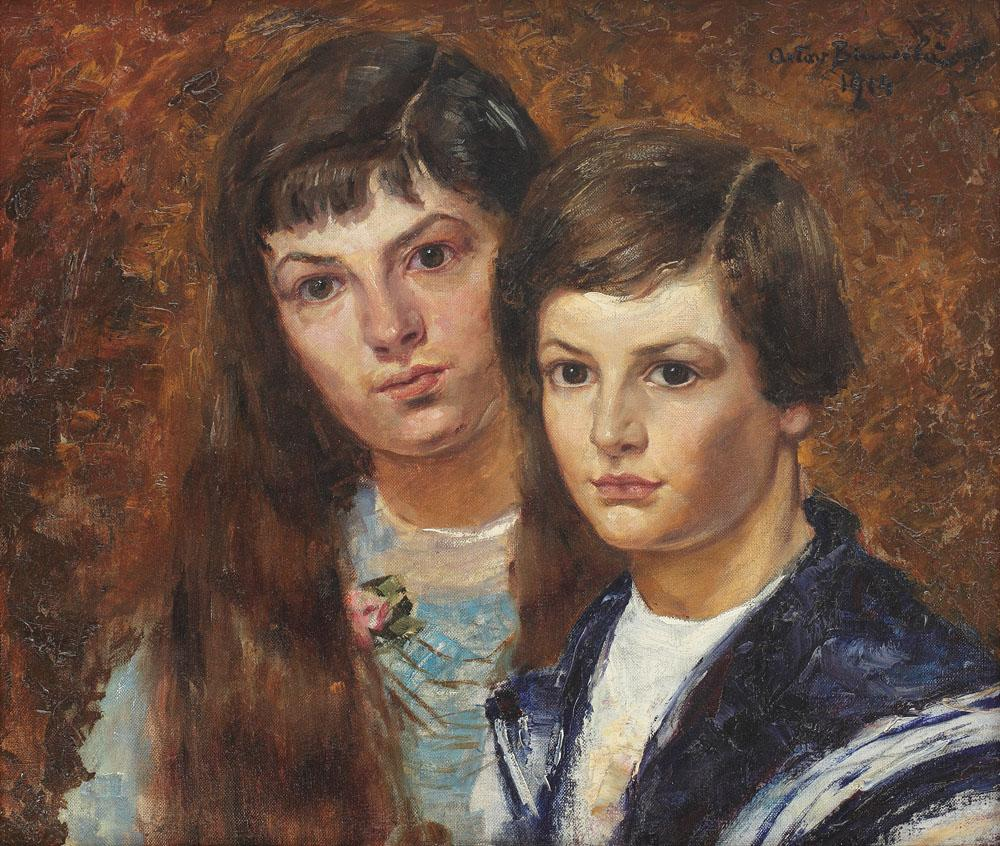
The Children of the Painter, 1914

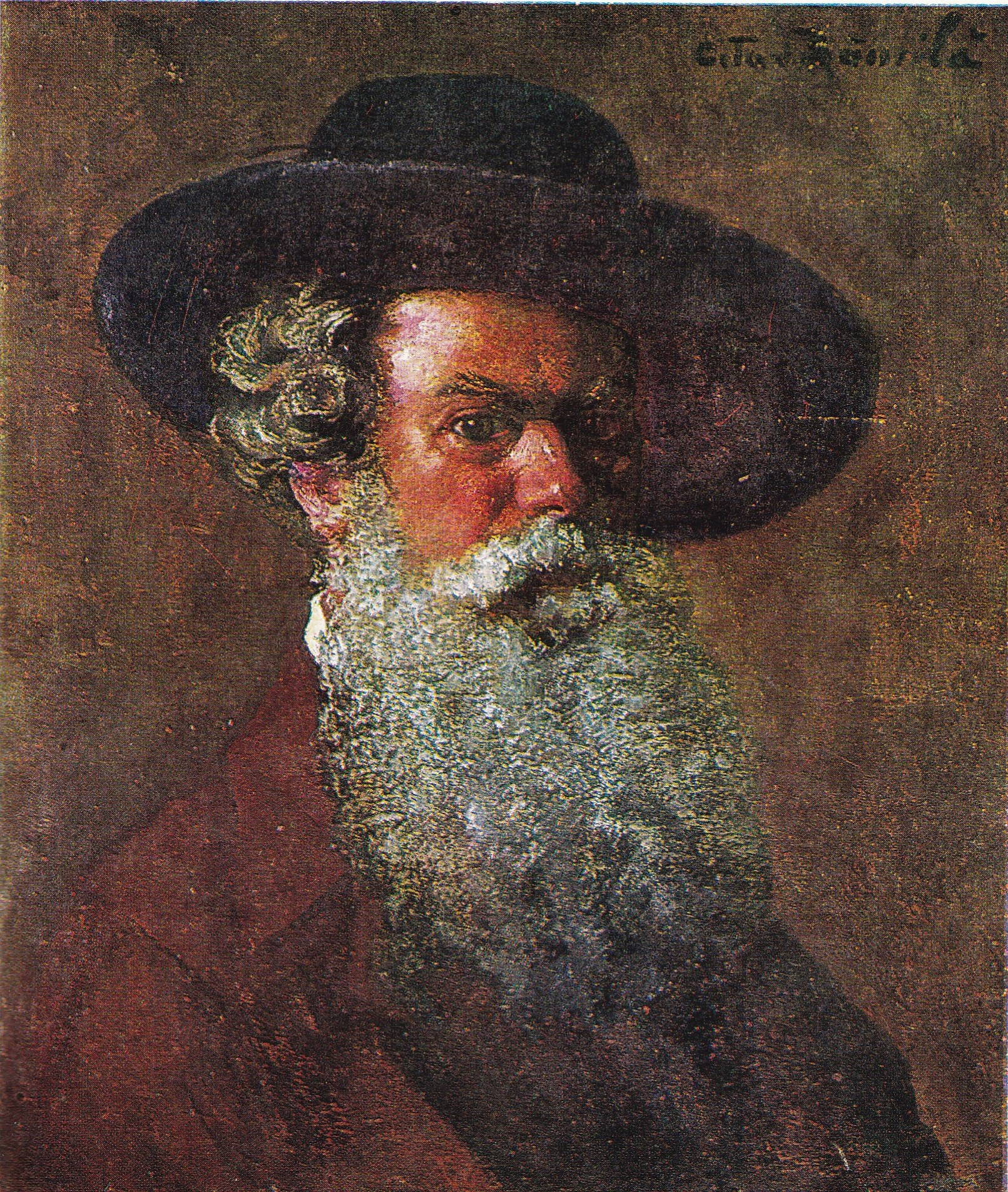
Self-portrait

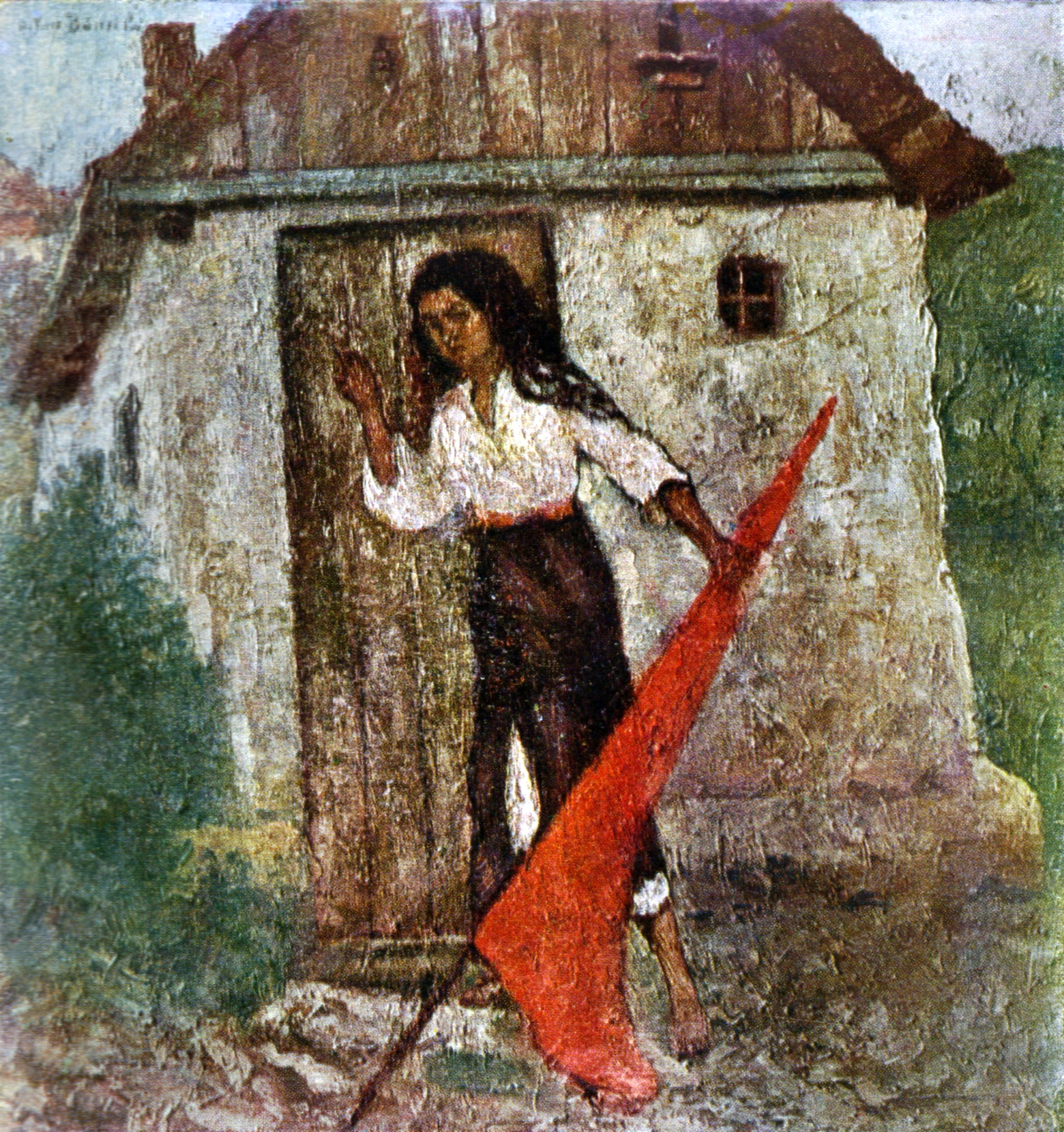
The Story (the foretelling) of the 1907 Uprising

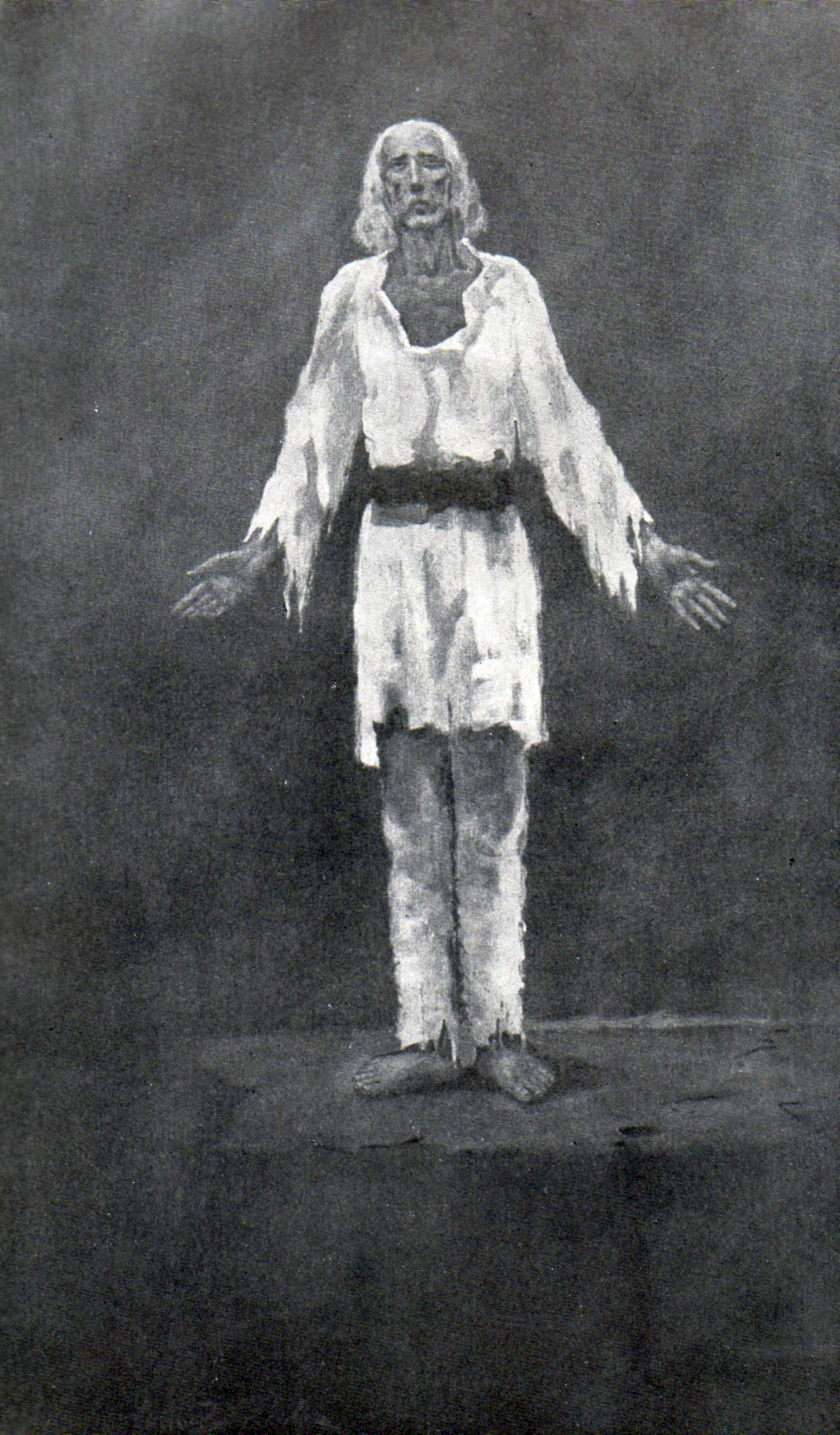
Before 1907

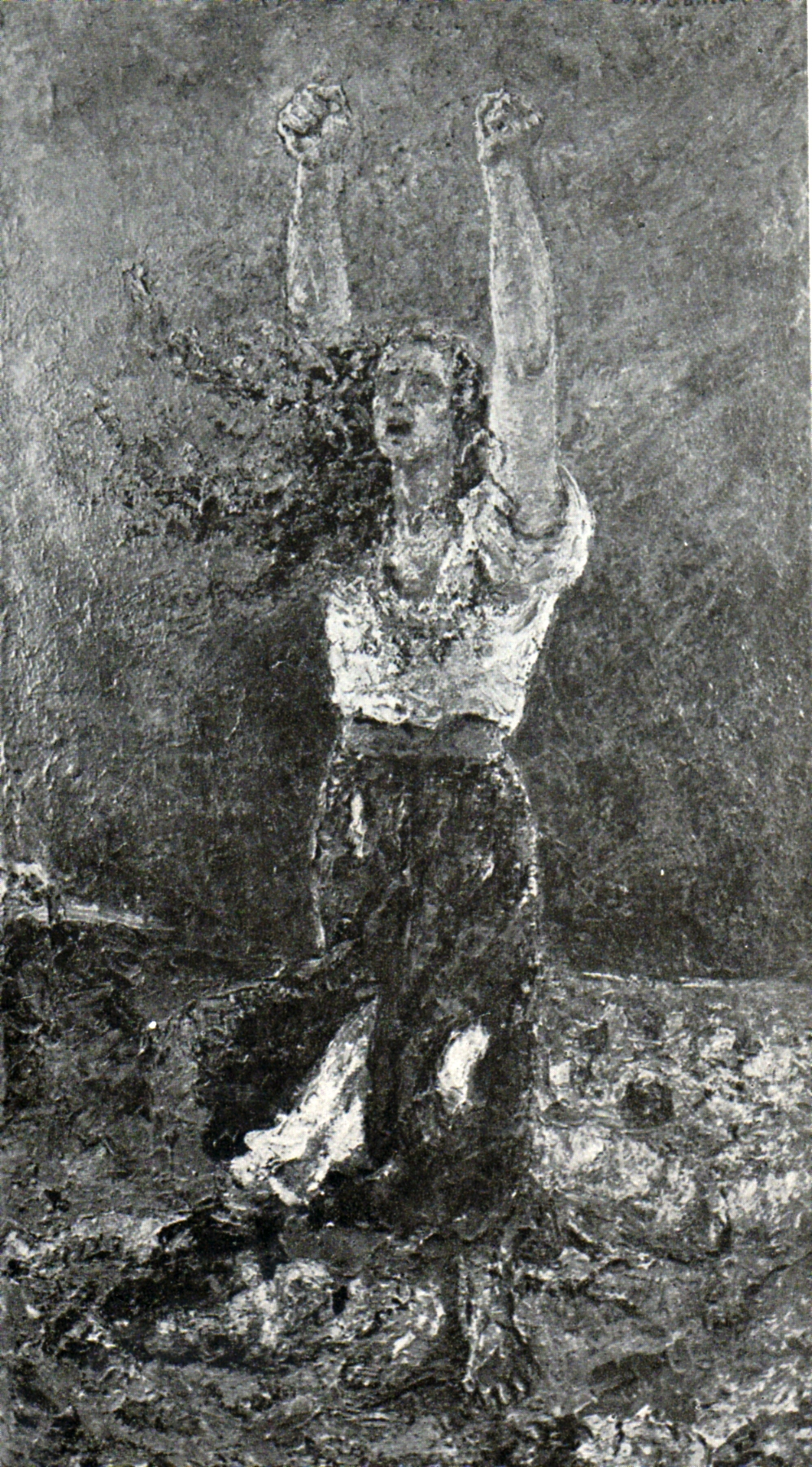
The curse

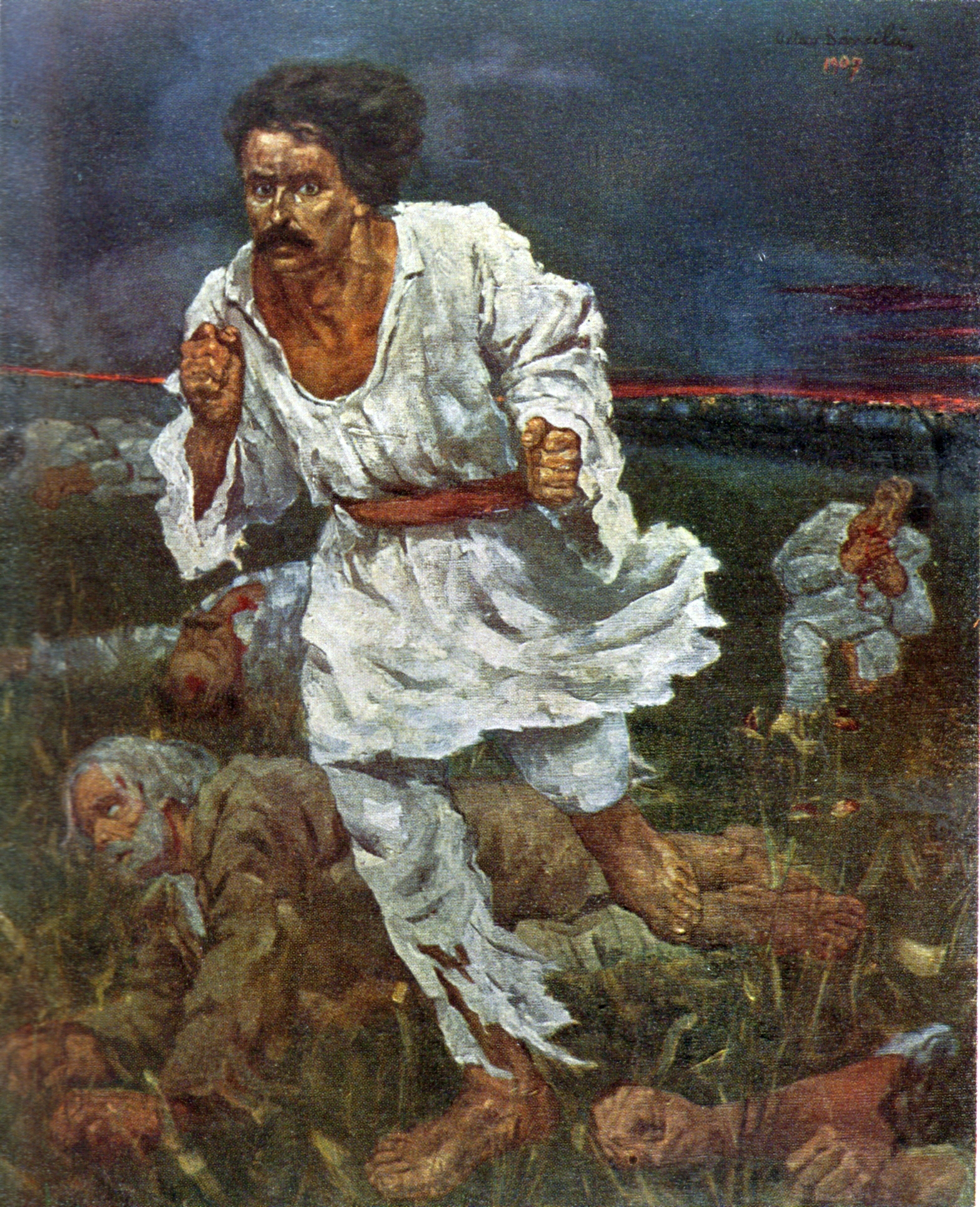
1907

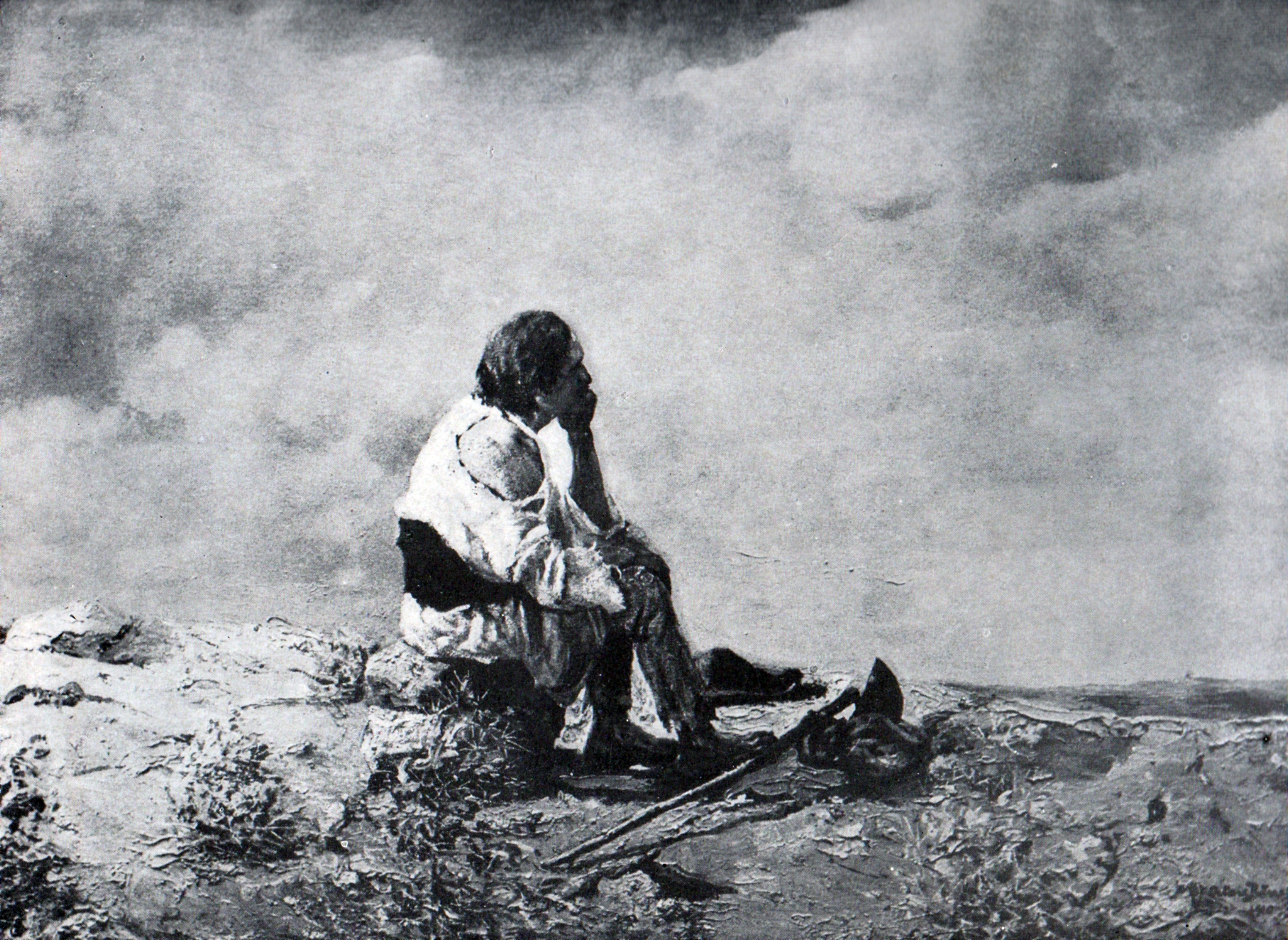
The wanderer {1910}

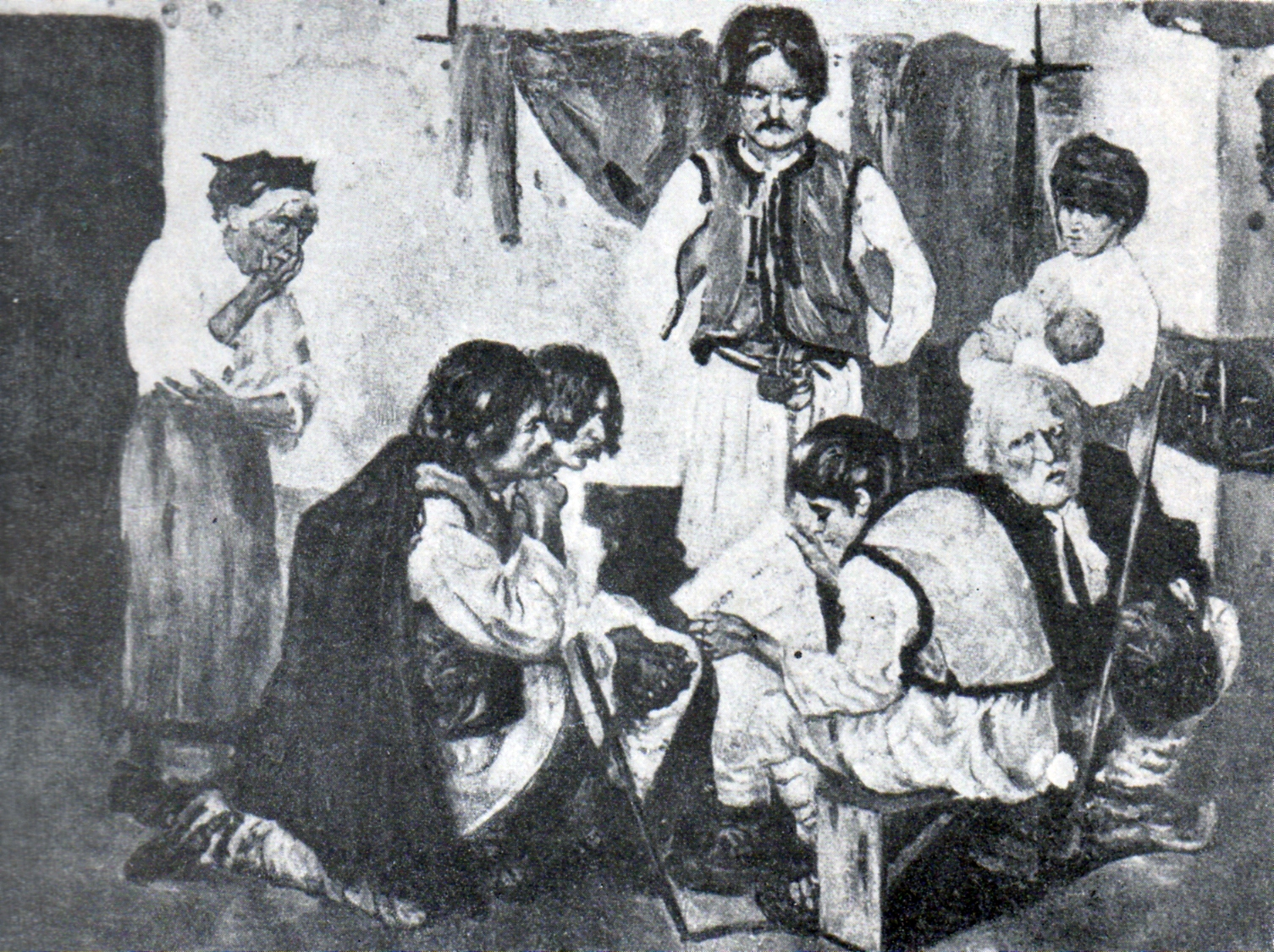
The propagandist {1914}

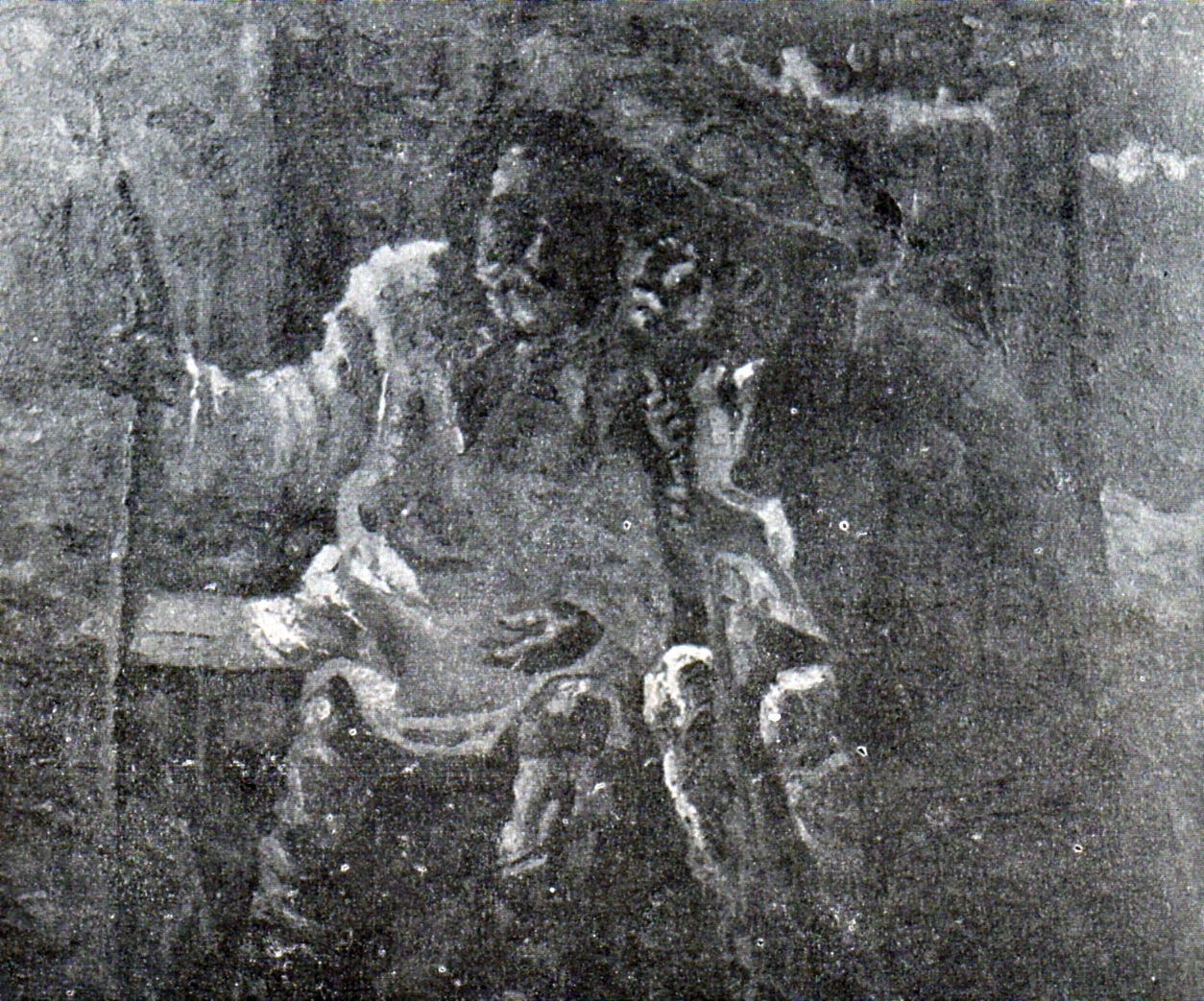
At a counsel

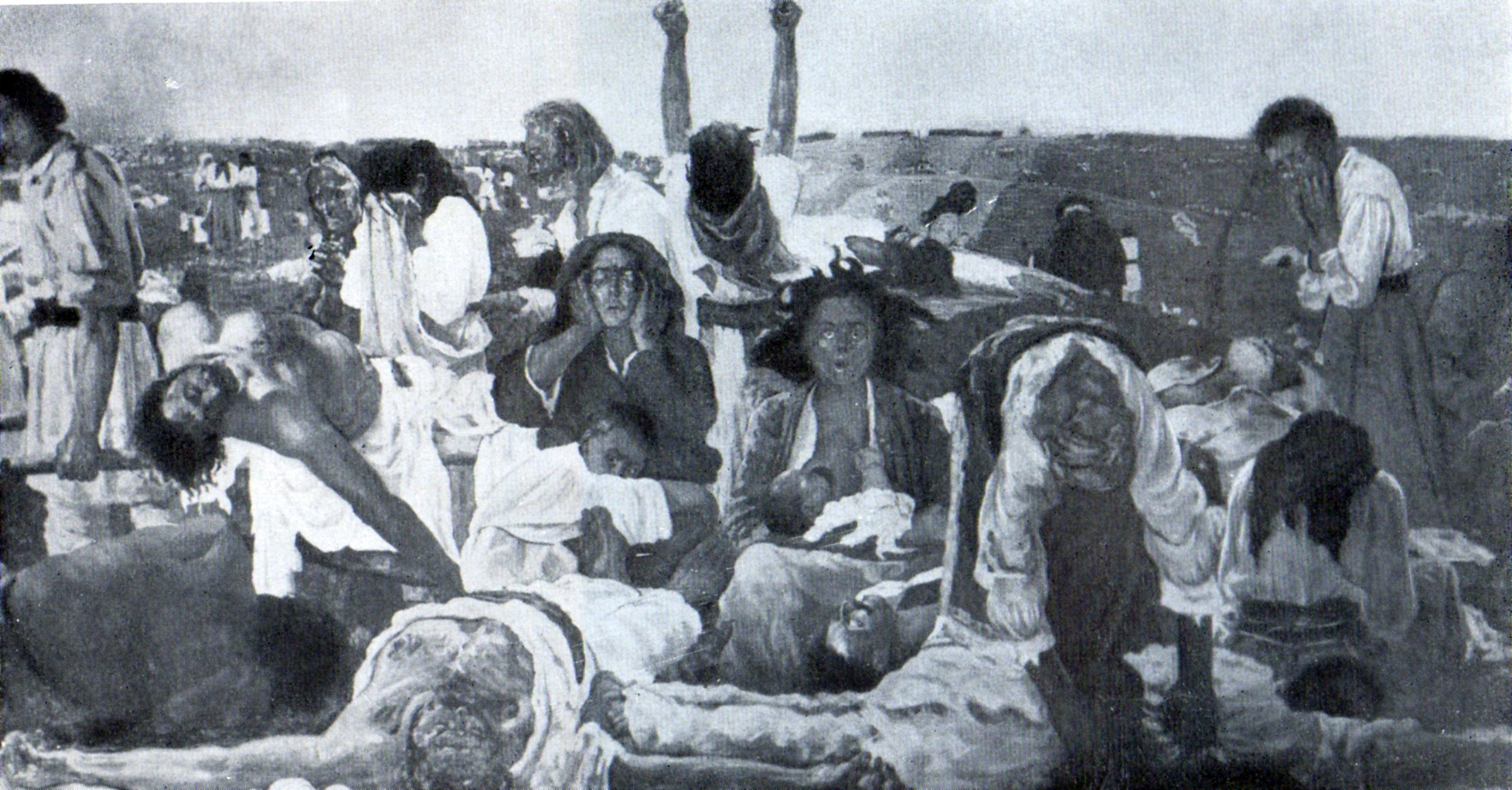
The recognition

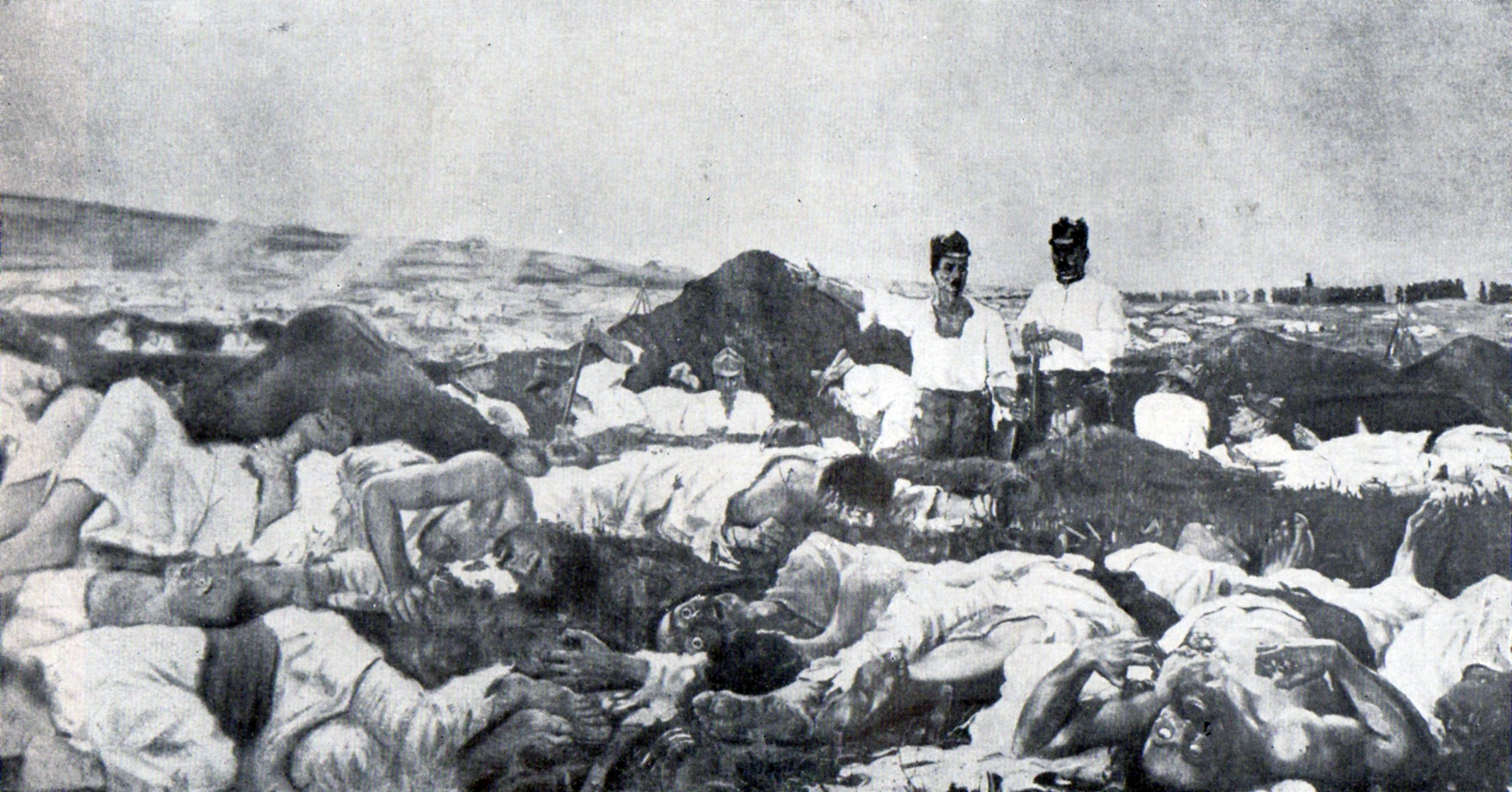
The funeral

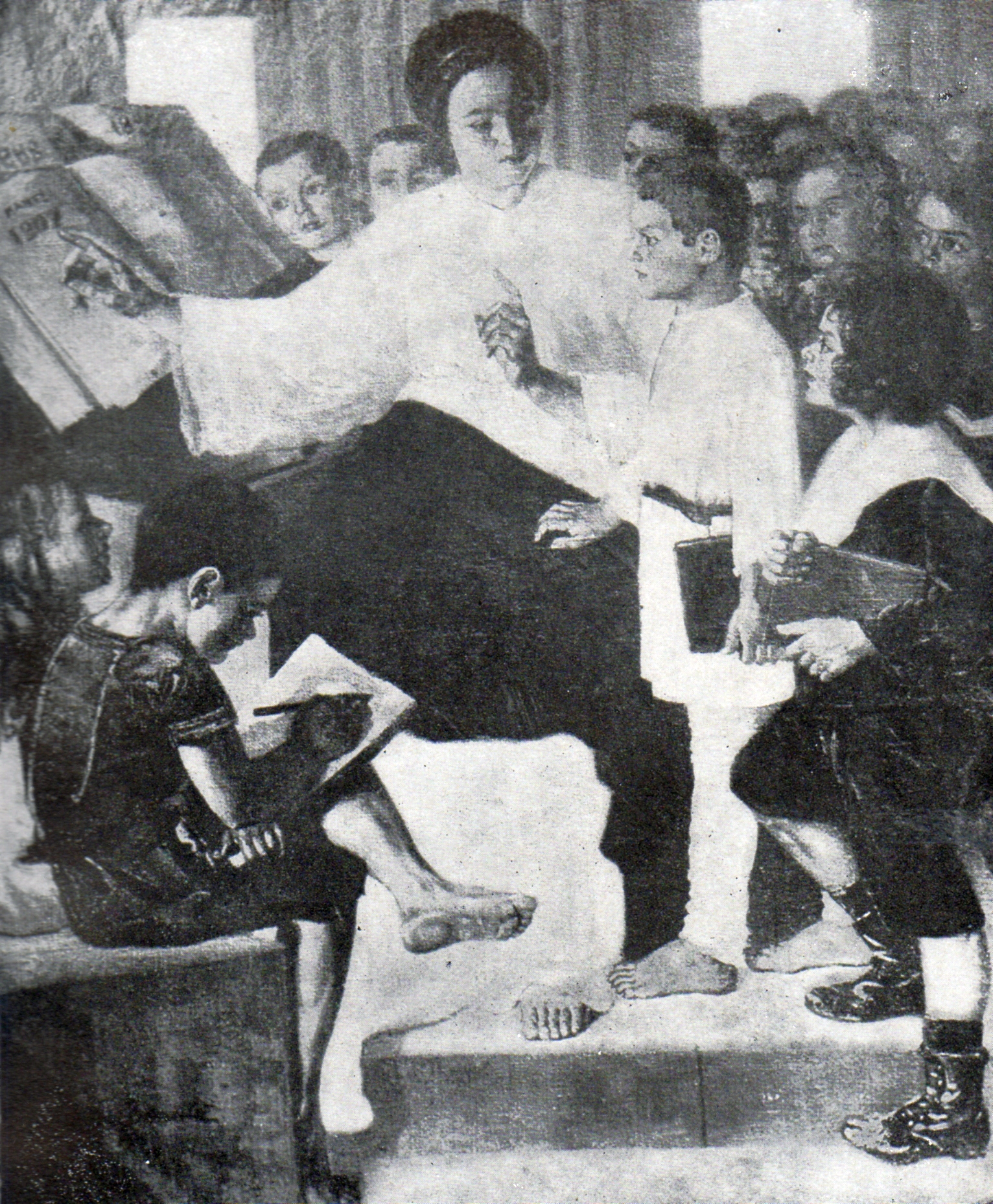
Historia
