= Serafim Saca =

Moldovan writer

Serafim Saca OR
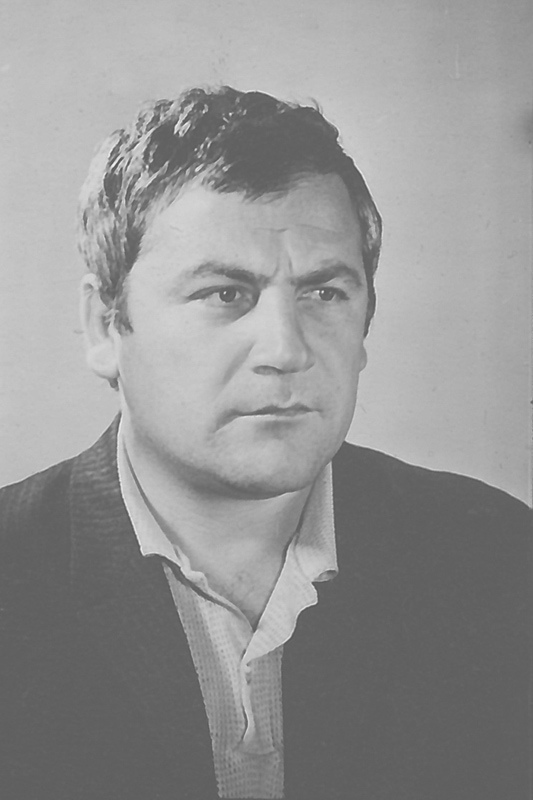
- Saca in 1969
- Born: 16 March 1935; Vancicăuți, Kingdom of Romania (now Vanchykivtsi, Ukraine)
- Died: 20 May 2011 (aged 76); Chișinău, Moldova
- Education: Moldova State University
- Employer: Academy of Sciences of Moldova
- Awards: Order of Work Glory

Serafim Saca (16 March 1935 – 20 May 2011) was a writer from Moldova. He is credited with being the author and director of several documentaries including House with Flowers (1965), Chișinău – 67 (1967), and Cross-Roads (1967). He became a member of the Moldovan Writers' Union in 1966. He was forbidden to publish between 1976 and 1987.

== Awards ==
- Premiul de Stat, 1987
- "Gloria Muncii" Order

== Bibliography ==
- Serafim Saka. Aici: atunci și acum. Dialoguri. Prefață de Leo Butnaru. Chișinău, Editura Prut Internațional, 2010.
