= Negrești, Neamț =

Negrești
- Commune
- Location in Neamț County

- Location in Romania
- Coordinates: 47.0343°N 26.3564°E
- Country: Romania
- County: Neamț

Government
  - Mayor (2020–2024): Neculai Nastasia (PNL)
- Area: 34.93 km^{2} (13.49 sq mi)
- Elevation: 440 m (1,440 ft)
- Population (2021-12-01): 1,660
  - Density: 47.5/km^{2} (123/sq mi)
- Time zone: UTC+02:00 (EET)
  - Summer (DST): UTC+03:00 (EEST)
- Postal code: 617157
- Area code: +(40) 233
- Vehicle reg.: NT
- Website: negrestineamt.ro

Negrești is a commune in Neamț County, Western Moldavia, Romania. It is composed of two villages, Negrești and Poiana.

The commune is located in the central part of the county, at an altitude of 440 m (1,440 ft), on the banks of the river Horăița.

Historical population
Year	Pop.	±%
1992	1,983	—
2002	1,935	−2.4%
2011	1,632	−15.7%
2021	1,660	+1.7%
Source: Census data

== Natives ==
- Dumitru Almaș (1908 – 1995), journalist, novelist, historian, and academic
