= Vanchykivtsi =

Village in Chernivtsi Oblast, Ukraine

- Village
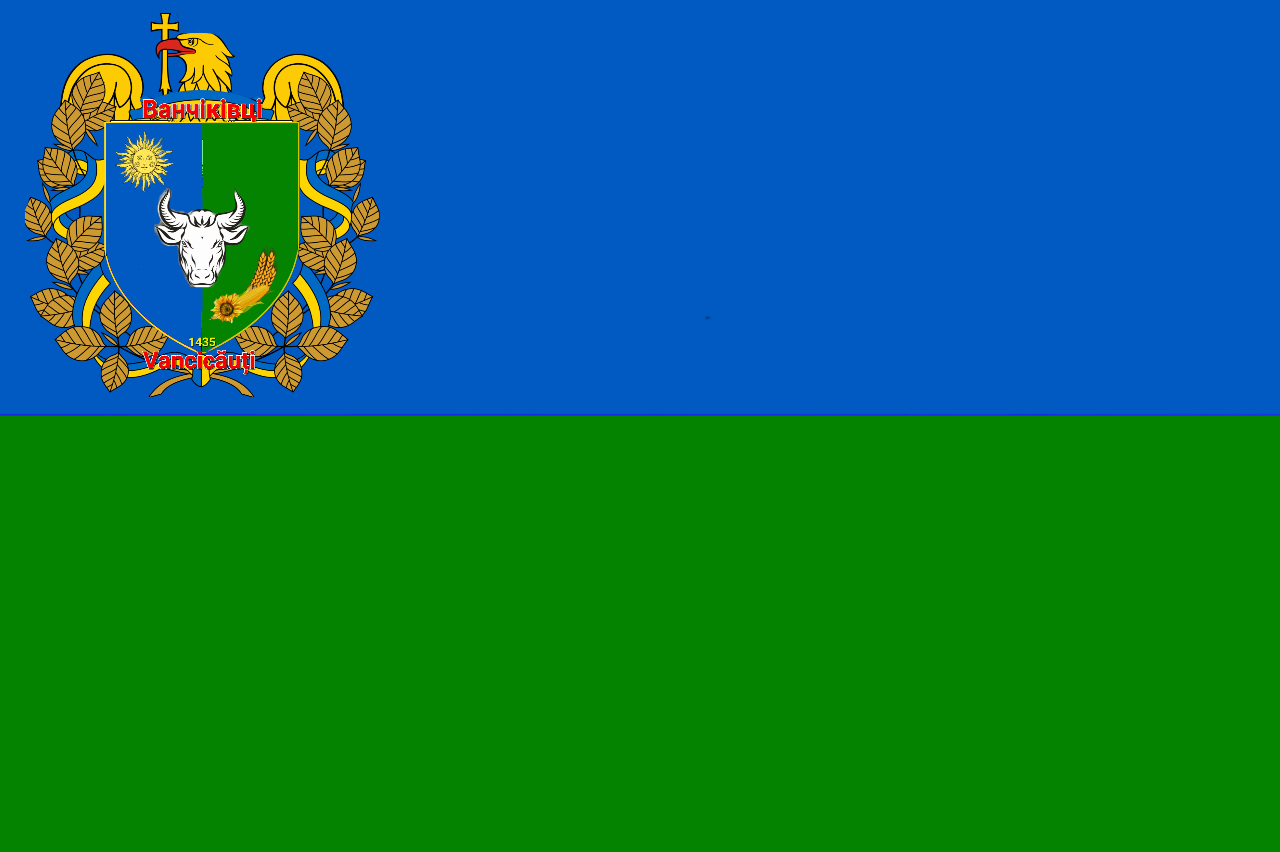
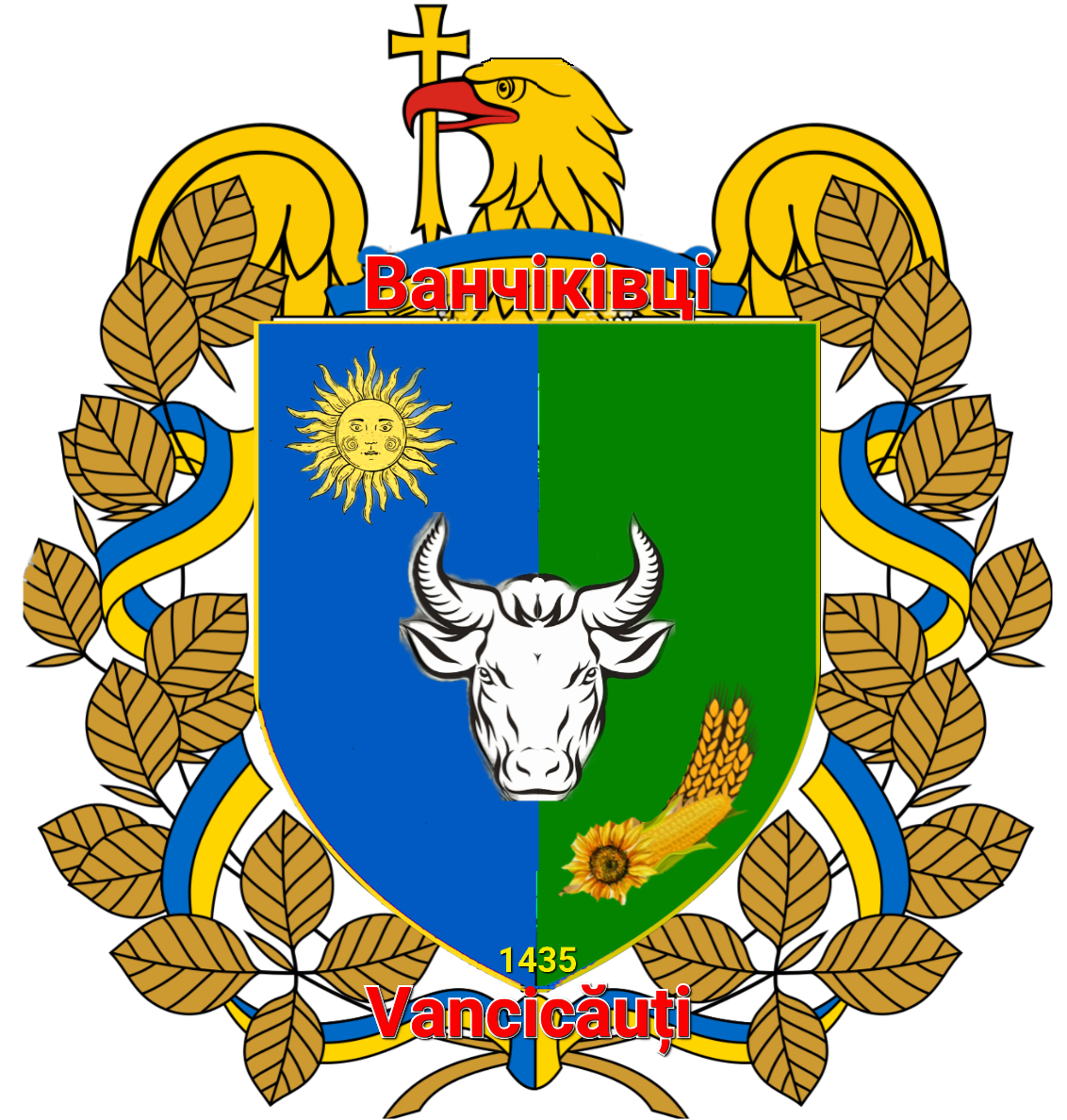
- Flag Coat of arms
- Interactive map of Vanchykivtsi
- Location in Ukraine Vanchykivtsi (Ukraine)
- Coordinates: 48°12′56″N 26°26′52″E
- Country: Ukraine
- Oblast: Chernivtsi
- Raion: Chernivtsi Raion
- Elevation: 124 m (407 ft)
- Time zone: UTC+2 (CET)
  - Summer (DST): UTC+3 (CEST)

Vanchykivtsi (Ukrainian: Ванчиківці; Romanian: Vancicăuții Mari) is a village in Chernivtsi Raion, Chernivtsi Oblast, Ukraine. It hosts the administration of Vanchykivtsi rural hromada, one of the hromadas of Ukraine. It was historically a part of Bessarabia.

Until 18 July 2020, Vanchykivtsi belonged to Novoselytsia Raion. The raion was abolished in July 2020 as part of the administrative reform of Ukraine, which reduced the number of raions of Chernivtsi Oblast to three. The area of Novoselytsia Raion was split between Chernivtsi and Dniester Raions, with Vanchykivtsi being transferred to Chernivtsi Raion. Vanchykivtsi is home to the recently remodeled historical Orthodox church Saint Vasily's. The southern edge of the village ends in barbed wire marking the border with Romania and with the European Union. Vanchykivtsi is known for using shovels instead of hoes to plant potatoes. In 2001, 94.5% of the inhabitants spoke Romanian as their native language, with a minority of Ukrainian speakers (4.74%).

== Notable people ==
- Călin Alupi (1906–1988), Romanian post-Impressionist painter
- Oazu Nantoi (born 1948), Moldovan politician and political analyst
- Serafim Saca (1935–2011), Moldovan writer
