= Mihai Nechita =

Romanian painter (born 1949)

- Born: Mihai Nechita-Burculeț; 5 February 1949; Sarca, Romania
- Known for: Painting

Mihai Nechita-Burculeț (born 5 February 1949, Sarca, Romania) is a Romanian painter.

He studied Plastic Arts at the Art Academy of Iași, History of Arts at the Nicolae Grigorescu Art Academy of Bucharest. His professors include: Dan Hatmanu, Dimitrie Gavrilean, and Victor Mihăilescu-Craiu. Since 1977 he is active as a drawing and art history teacher in Târgu Ocna, Bacău.

== Influences ==
Mihai Nechita's art may be defined as one harmonic combination of surrealism, humour and deep feelings.

- The Universal painting - the basis of composition and colours from the 17th-18th century: Spanish School (Velasquez, Zurbarán), the Flamand School (Rembrandt), the Holland School (Vermeer)
- The 20th century, subconscious research - Salvador Dalí, René Magritte, Victor Brauner, Tristan Tzara
- Romanian painting influences seen in the specific elements of Corneliu Baba, Victor Mihăilescu-Craiu, Dan Hatmanu
- The Orthodox influence: there is a visible connection between Mihai Nechita and the Orthodox religion. The painter also makes religious paintings inspired from the Byzantine art.

Since childhood, the painter Mihai Nechita-Burculeț has shown a high interest in landscapes and the surroundings of his natal village, whose colours and shapes can be noticed even in his later paintings. The most important period of time from the artistic development point of view were the years spent next to the painter Victor Mihăilescu-Craiu, one of the greatest Romanian peisagists. Craiu represented the first and the most important mentor professor next to whom Mihai Nechita discovered the secrets of colours and composition and the deep love for painting.

The technique he uses is the one of classic oil on canvas. The compositional harmony and colour harmony follow the rules of classic composition. His paintings are very detailed both in concept and technical part. He makes the frames himself, those being part of the painting. There have also been times when he used to prepare the colours and other special products following the old customs.

== Directions/Tendencies/Themes ==
The work of Mihai Nechita-Burculeț is based on the Byzantine and Romanian traditional elements and tends to universality. Most of his paintings are surrealists created in a realist technique. His painting shows his own image of the surrounding world. Many of his paintings show connections with his natal village through landscapes, colours, houses, but also through the objects he used in different compositions. A preferred theme is the one of human attitude but also the fake treated with light irony, shortly the theatre of our world. The portraits present imaginary people and some very close characters of his life: his mother, his wife, the daughter, the son and strange self portraits like the "Self portrait at 80 years".

An important face of the work of Mihai Nechita is connected to the Orthodox believe. He does not make only icons, but he also restoration work of cult objects and church paintings, for technique and for history of art reasons.

Besides painting, among the painter's interests are also urban design and peisagistic projects of restoration of historic and art monuments. He realised and ran the construction and execution of the following projects:

- The Târgu Ocna Political Prisoners' Monument, near the old jail;
- The Monument of the entrance in the same town;
- The Concept and the realisation of interior design of "Costache Negri" High school of Târgu Ocna.
- The Concept and the realisation of the exterior walls of the "Neon Wiesbauer" in Regensburg, Germany.

== Exhibitions ==
Personal Exhibitions:

- 2015 Piatra Neamț, (Romania);
- 2004 Regensburg (Germany);
- 2004 Sittard (Holland);
- 2002 Onești, (Romania);
- 2001 Bucharest, (Romania);
- 1996 Regensburg (Germany);
- 1991 Rixheim (Franta);
- 1989 Ploiești, (Romania);
- 1988 Cluj, (Romania);
- 1987 Bacău, (Romania);
- 1979, 1983, 1995, 1999 Onești, (Romania);
- 1975, 1977 Iași, (Romania);

Group Exhibitions:

- 1976-2001 in Iași, Bacău, Chișinău, Galați, Suceava, Bucharest

The painter's works are in private collections in France, Germany, Holland, Canada, Israel, England and Romania.
