= Corni, Botoșani =

Corni
- Commune
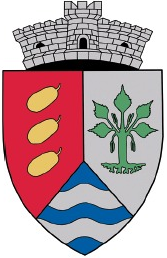
- Coat of arms

- Location in Botoșani County

- Location in Romania
- Coordinates: 47°39′N 26°35′E
- Country: Romania
- County: Botoșani
- Subdivisions: Corni, Balta Arsă, Mesteacăn, Sarafinești

Government
  - Mayor (2024–2028): Valerian Vărvăruc (PSD)
- Area: 71.16 km^{2} (27.48 sq mi)
- Elevation: 290 m (950 ft)
- Population (2021-12-01): 5,761
  - Density: 81/km^{2} (210/sq mi)
- Time zone: EET/EEST (UTC+2/+3)
- Postal code: 717085
- Vehicle reg.: BT
- Website: primariacomuneicorni.ro

Corni is a commune in Botoșani County, Western Moldavia, Romania. It is composed of four villages: Balta Arsă, Corni, Mesteacăn, and Sarafinești.

The commune is located in the southwestern part of the county, on the border with Suceava County.

== Natives ==
- Octav Băncilă (1872–1944), realist painter and left-wing activist
