= Sofia Nădejde =

Romanian novelist, playwright, translator, journalist, activist and socialist

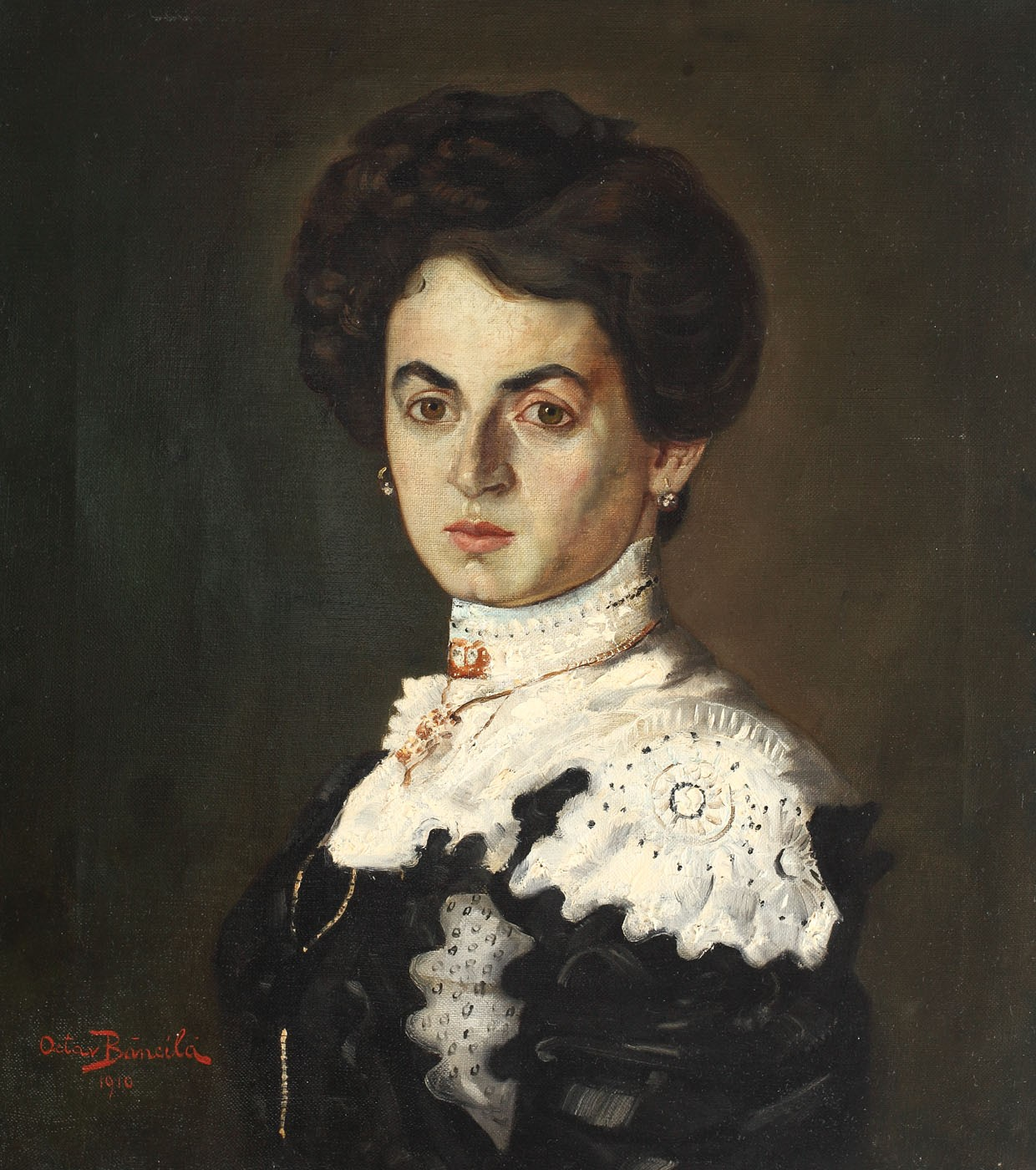
Nădejde in 1910, portrait by her brother Octav Băncilă

Sofia Nădejde (born Sofia Băncilă; September 14, 1856 – June 11, 1946) was a Romanian novelist, playwright, translator, journalist, women's rights activist and socialist.

Born in Botoșani, her parents were merchant Vasile Băncilă-Gheorghiu and his wife Pulheria (née Neculce). Her husband was journalist Ioan Nădejde, and she was the sister of painter Octav Băncilă. She attended primary and girls' boarding school in her native town, taking her high school-leaving examination in Iași. A member of the socialist circle in the latter city, she undertook a sustained journalistic campaign for women's social and political emancipation. In 1893, she led Evenimentul literar magazine; publications that ran her work include Femeia română, the official socialist Contemporanul, Drepturile omului, Literatură și știință, Lumea nouă, Lumea nouă științifică și literară, Universul, Albina, Adevărul, Noua revistă română, Dimineața and Arta. She was part of the Contemporanul circle, alongside Constantin Mille, Traian Demetrescu, Anton Bacalbașa, Paul Bujor and Ștefan Băsărăbeanu. Her articles dealt with the evolution of the family, women's place in the socialist movement, prejudices regarding women's education, social movements and women's work, both rural and factory. She displayed deep familiarity with contemporary European philosophical and scientific thinking, referencing John Stuart Mill, Herbert Spencer, Charles Darwin, Karl Marx and August Bebel. Writing in Contemporanul, she began a campaign against the then-common idea that women's smaller brains precluded them from attaining a higher spiritual plane or participating in politics. Using the latest available information, Nădejde used examples of working women to explain that women are smarter and stronger than men because they are required to work alongside their husbands and also take care of the children and housework, and was involved in an especially acerbic polemic with Titu Maiorescu. She then shifted to factors such as social environment, prejudice, discriminatory laws and insufficient education to explain women's backward state, using Mill's Subjection of Women to call for political and civil rights.

In the early 1880s, Nădejde brought together women from various groups and clubs to raise funds for women's education and employment. Starting in 1886 and under the influence of Marxism, she began to focus on social inequality in general, seeing women's status as a byproduct of capitalism and private ownership. By the mid-1890s, her Marxism had given way to democratic liberalism; she was attracted to the ideas of Poporanism propagated by the movement's leader Constantin Stere, writing for the movement's press affiliate Evenimentul literar. In 1899, together with her husband and a significant faction, she left the socialist movement, convinced it had no basis to take hold in agrarian Romania, and lost her interest in political engagement, shifting instead toward literature.

Her first published fiction, the novella Două mame, appeared in Contemporanul in 1884 and 1886. Her first book was the 1893 short story collection Nuvele. Her work includes sketches and stories: Din chinurile vieții. Fiecare la rândul său (1895); tales: Din lume pentru lume – Povestiri din popor (1909); novels: Patimi (1903), Robia banului (1906), Părinți și copii (1907); and plays: O iubire la țară (1895), Fără noroc (1898), Ghica Vodă, domnul Moldovei (1899), Vae victis! Vai de învinși (1903).

In her fiction, Nădejde imported the ideas and concerns of her journalistic work, cultivating the notion of "art with tendency" theorized by Constantin Dobrogeanu-Gherea. The main theme of her writing was the oppression of women, and her novels are imbued with a feminist sensibility. In the years before World War I, she also wrote non-fiction articles concerned with women's ability to function in a modern society and economy. In 1918, she helped found an organization for the civil and political emancipation of women, and in the 1930s, amidst the rise of totalitarianism in Europe, she spoke out in favor of democracy and civil rights. After her husband's death in 1928, she moved in with her daughter Amelia, living on a small pension from the Romanian Writers' Society. She died in her daughter's Bucharest home in 1946.

In 2018, at the initiative of poet Elena Vlădăreanu, the "Sofia Nădejde" Awards for Literature Written by Women were established. The awards are presented annually at a Gala and the categories of prizes awarded are Poetry, Prose, Debut Poetry, Debut Prose as well as special prizes for Innovation and Outstanding Contributions to Literature.
