= Dobreni =

- Commune
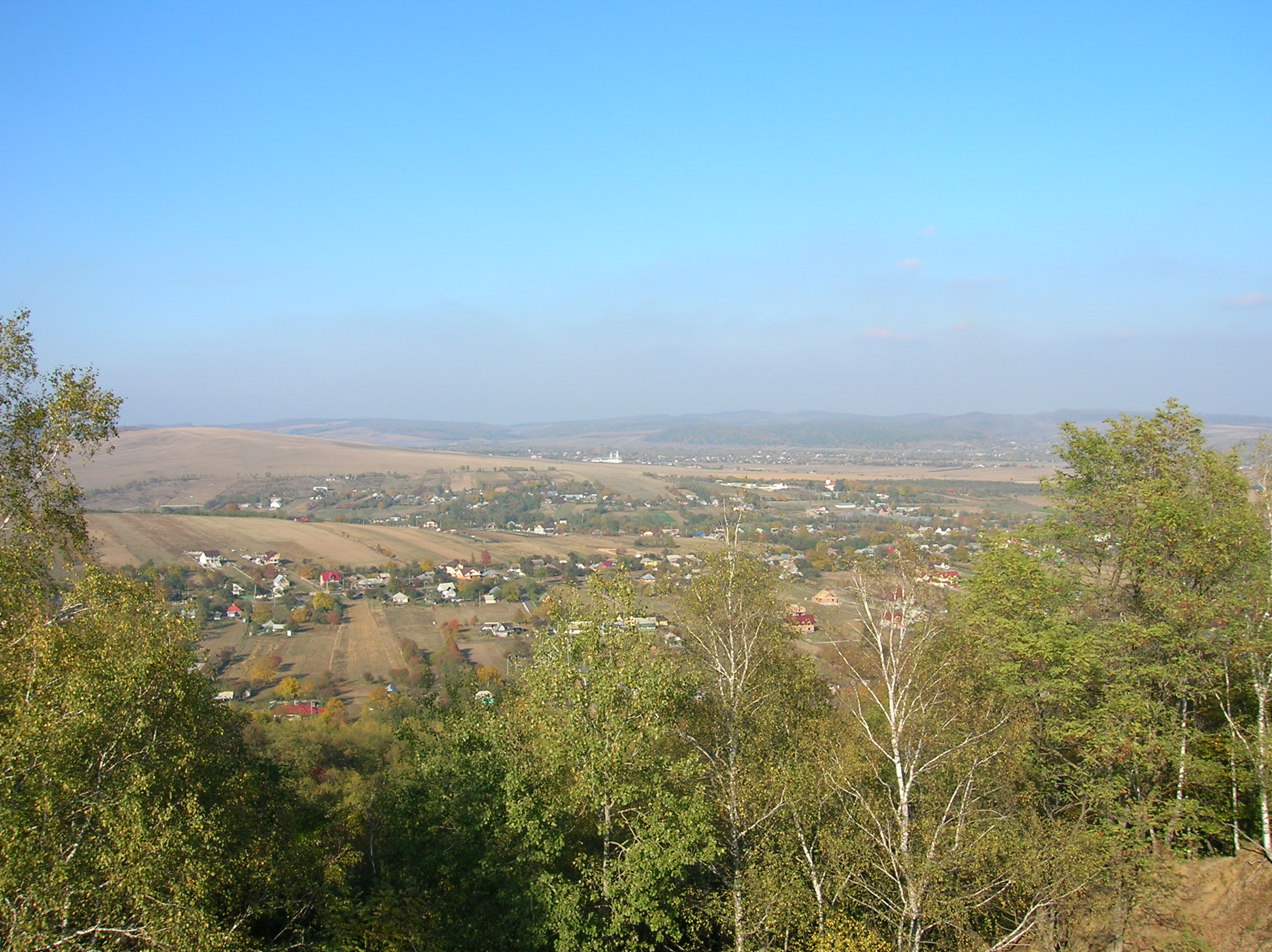

- Location in Neamț County

- Location in Romania
- Coordinates: 47°0′N 26°24′E
- Country: Romania
- County: Neamț

Government
  - Mayor (2024–2028): Vasilica Crețu (PSD)
- Area: 23.43 km^{2} (9.05 sq mi)
- Elevation: 405 m (1,329 ft)
- Population (2021-12-01): 1,712
  - Density: 73.07/km^{2} (189.2/sq mi)
- Time zone: UTC+02:00 (EET)
  - Summer (DST): UTC+03:00 (EEST)
- Postal code: 617153
- Area code: +(40) 233
- Vehicle reg.: NT
- Website: comunadobreni.ro

Dobreni is a commune in Neamț County, Western Moldavia, Romania. It is composed of three villages: Cășăria, Dobreni, and Sărata.

Historical population
Year	Pop.	±%
1992	1,616	—
2002	1,739	+7.6%
2011	1,842	+5.9%
2021	1,712	−7.1%
Source: Census data

== Natives ==
- Constantin Daniel Stahi (1844 – 1920), painter and gravure artist
