= Gheorghe Panaiteanu Bardasare =

Romanian painter

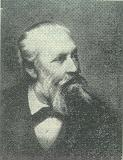
Gheorghe Panaiteanu - Bardasare

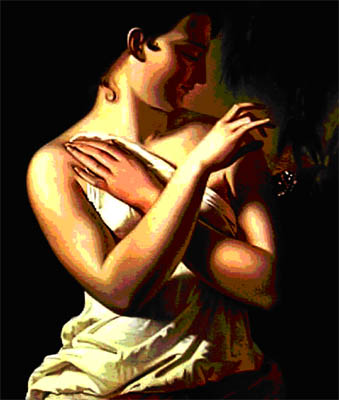
Gheorghe Panaiteanu Bardasare - The girl with the butterfly

Gheorghe Panaiteanu Bardasare (1816, Burdujeni, Suceava – 1900, Iași) was a Romanian painter.
