= Daniel Popescu =

Daniel Popescu may refer to:

- Dan Popescu (born 1988), Romanian footballer
- Ilie Daniel Popescu (born 1983), Romanian gymnast
- Daniel Popescu (politician) (born 1981), Romanian politician
- Daniel Florentin Popescu (born 1993), Romanian football goalkeeper
- Dan Ioan Popescu (born 1948), Romanian businessman and politician
