= Rohonc Codex =

Manuscript

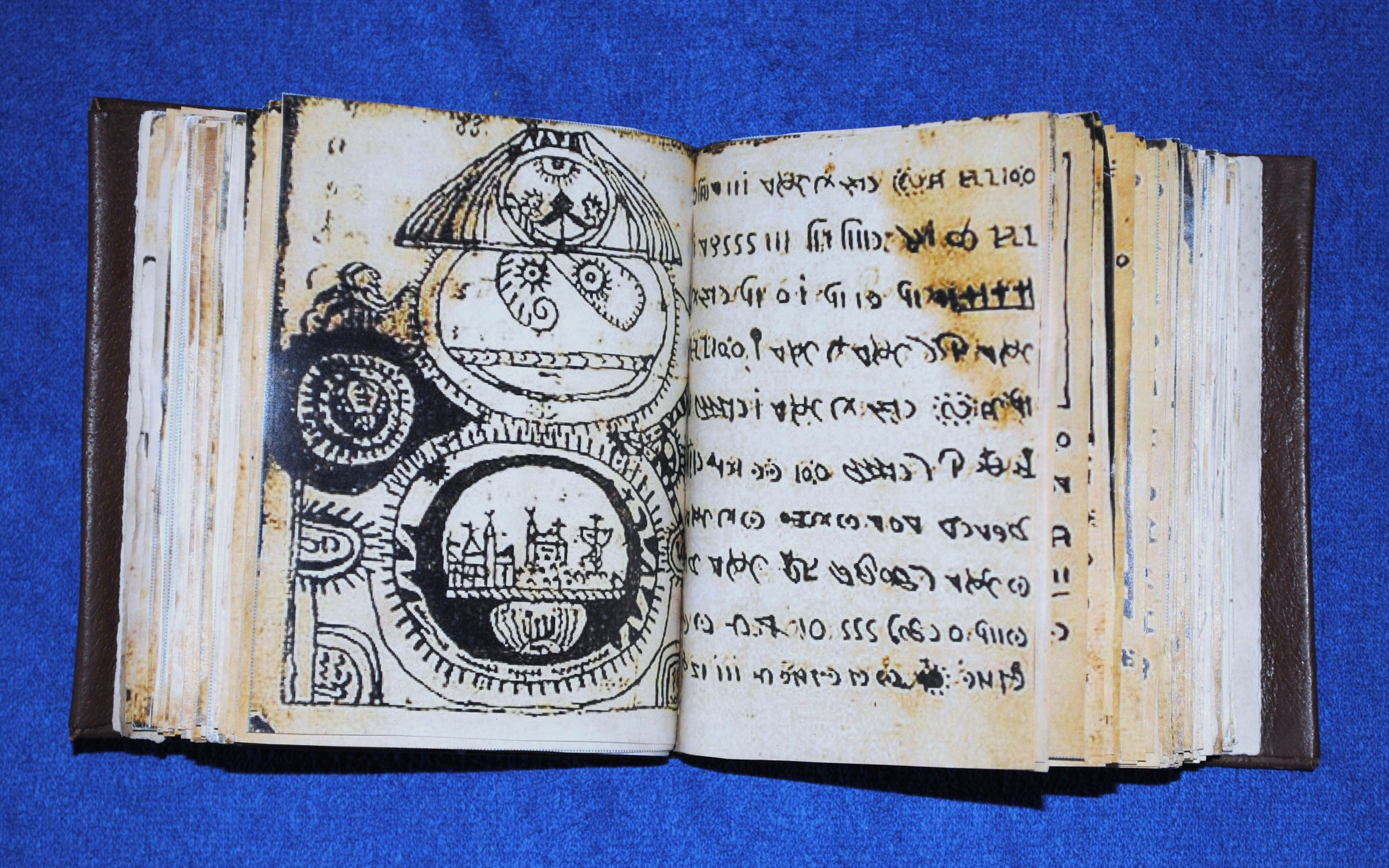
A facsimile of the Rohonc Codex

The Rohonc Codex (Hungarian pronunciation: [ˈrohont͡s]) is an illustrated manuscript book by an unknown author, with a text in an unknown language and writing system, that surfaced in Hungary in the early 19th century. The book's origin and the meaning of its text and illustrations have been investigated by many scholars and amateurs, with no definitive conclusion, although many Hungarian scholars believe that it is an 18th-century hoax.

The name of the codex is often spelled Rohonczi, according to the old Hungarian orthography that was reformed in the first half of the 19th century. This spelling has become widespread, likely due to a book published on the codex by V. Enăchiuc in 2002. Today, the name of the codex is often written in Hungarian as Rohonci kódex.

== History ==
The codex was named after the city of Rohonc, in Western Hungary (now Rechnitz, Austria), where it was kept until 1838, when it was donated to the Hungarian Academy of Sciences by Gusztáv Batthyány, a Hungarian count, together with his entire library.

The origin of the codex is unknown. A possible trace of its past may be an entry in the 1743 catalogue of the Batthyánys' Rohonc library, which reads "Magyar imádságok, volumen I in 12" ("Hungarian prayers in one volume, size duodecimo"). Both the size and the assumed content of the volume described fit the codex, but no further information is given in the catalogue, rendering an exact match to the codex impossible.

== Location and accessibility ==
The official library description of the manuscript (Csapodi, 1973)

The Rohonc Codex is located in the Library of the Hungarian Academy of Sciences. (Note: For an official catalogue entry, see Csapodi 1973.) (Note: The codex's call number is K 114; its old call number was Magyar Codex 12^{o} 1.) Special permission is needed to study the codex. However, a microfilm copy is available. (Note: The call number of the microfilm copy is MF 1173/II.)

In 2015, the codex was rescanned by Hamburg University, but only eight higher-resolution pages were published.

A digital copy is available at the REAL repository of the Library.

== Features ==
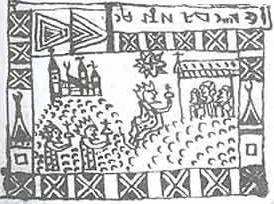
An illustration in the Rohonc Codex

The codex has 448 paper pages measuring 12 by 10 centimetres (4.7 in × 3.9 in), with each page having between 9 and 14 rows of symbols, which may or may not be letters. Besides the text, there are 87 illustrations that include religious, laic, and military scenes. The crude illustrations seem to indicate an environment where Christian, Muslim, and Pagan religions coexist, as the symbols of the cross, crescent, and sun/swastika are all present.

The number of symbols used in the codex is about ten times higher than any known alphabet, with Némäti (1889) having counted 792, but most symbols are used with little repetition, so the symbols in the codex might not be an alphabet, but instead a syllabary, or be logographic in nature, such as Chinese characters. The justification of the right margin would seem to imply the symbols were written from right to left.

Study of the paper on which the codex is written shows that it is most probably a Venetian paper made in the 1530s. This does not provide certainty as to the date of the text, however, since it may have been transcribed from an earlier source, or the paper could have been used long after it was produced. Taking a clue from the illustrations, Láng speculates the document was most likely created sometime in the 16th-17th centuries. (Note: According to Joe Nickell the pages were written not long after the production of the paper; see Láng 2011, p. 53.)

== Analysis ==
As the existence of the codex has become more widely known, since the 19th century, the codex has been studied by many scholars and amateurs. However, there is no widely accepted and convincing translation or interpretation of the text.

=== Language hypotheses ===
No hypothesis as to the language of the codex has been backed as a universal solution, though many – including Hungarian, Dacian, early Romanian or Cuman, and even Hindi – have been proposed.

In 1892, Némäti discussed the codex's authenticity to the Hungarian language and the possibility that it is a paleo-Hungarian script.

In 2004, Singh and Bárdi discussed the possibility of it being a version of the Brahmi script.

=== 19th Century ===
The codex was studied by Hungarian scholar Ferenc Toldy around 1840, and later by Pál Hunfalvy and by Austrian paleography expert Albert Mahl. Josef Jireček and his son, Konstantin Josef Jireček, both university professors in Prague, studied 32 pages of the codex in 1884–1885. In 1885, the codex was sent to Bernhard Jülg, a professor at Innsbruck University. Mihály Munkácsy, the celebrated Hungarian painter, also took the codex with him to Paris in the years 1890–1892 to study it.

In 1866, Hungarian historian Károly Szabó (1824–1890) proposed that the codex was a hoax by Sámuel Literáti Nemes (1796–1842), a Transylvanian-Hungarian antiquarian, and co-founder of the National Széchényi Library in Budapest. Nemes is known to have created many historical forgeries (mostly made in the 1830s) which deceived even some of the most renowned Hungarian scholars of the time. Since then, this opinion of forgery has been maintained by mainstream Hungarian scholarship, even though there is no evidence connecting the codex to Nemes specifically.

=== Systematic and computer analysis ===
A strictly methodical investigation of the symbols was first done in 1970 by Ottó Gyürk, who examined repeated sequences to find the direction of writing, arguing for a right-to-left, top-to-bottom order, with pages also ordered right-to-left; Gyürk also identified numbers in the text. His later remarks suggest that he also has many unpublished conjectures, based on a large amount of statistical data.

Miklós Locsmándi did some computer-based research on the text in the mid-1990s. His research findings were consistent with the work published by Gyürk. Locsmándi added several others conjectures.

He claimed the symbol "i" to be a sentence delimiter (but also the symbol of 11 (eleven), and possibly also a place value delimiter in numbers). He studied the diacritics of the symbols (mostly dots), but found no peculiar system in their usage. As he could see no traces of case endings (which are typically characteristic to the Hungarian language), he assumed that the text was probably in a language other than Hungarian. He could not prove that the codex is not a hoax; however, seeing the regularities of the text, he rejected the idea of it being pure gibberish.

=== Sumero-Hungarian hypothesis ===
Attila Nyíri of Hungary proposed a solution in 1996 after studying two pages of the codex. He turned the pages upside down, identified a Sumerian ligature, and then associated Latin alphabet letters to the rest of the symbols by resemblance. However, he sometimes transliterated the same symbol with different letters, and conversely, the same letter was decoded from several symbols. Even then he had to rearrange the order of the letters to produce meaningful words.

The text, if taken as meaningful, is of religious, perhaps liturgical character. Its beginning, according to Nyíri, reads:

Eljött az Istened. Száll az Úr. Ó. Vannak a szent angyalok. Azok. Ó. "Your God has come. The Lord flies. Oh. There are the holy angels. Them. Oh."

Nyíri's proposition was immediately criticised by Ottó Gyürk, pointing to the fact that with such a permissive deciphering method one can get anything out of the code. Also, the mere fact that Nyíri makes an uncritical allusion to the fringe theory that the Hungarian language descended from Sumerian discredits his enterprise.

=== Daco-Romanian hypothesis ===
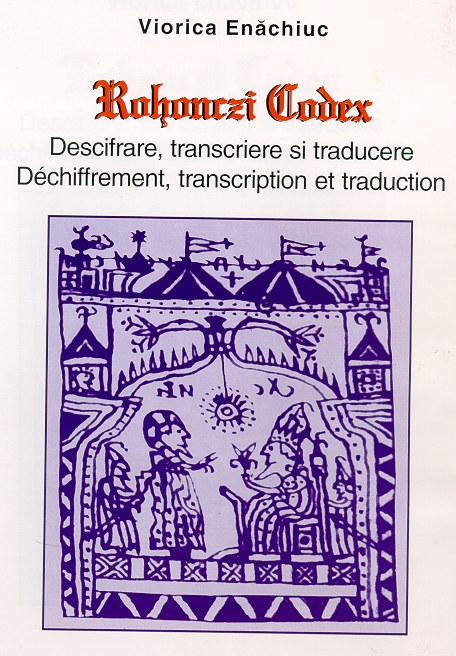
The cover of V. Enăchiuc's book

A proposed translation was published in 2002 by Romanian philologist Viorica Enăchiuc. Enăchiuc claimed that the text had been written in the Dacian dialect of vulgar Latin, and the direction of writing is right-to-left, bottom-to-top. The alleged translation indicates that the text is an 11–12th century CE history of the Blaki (Vlachs) people in their fights against Hungarians and Pechenegs. Toponyms and hydronyms appear as Arad, Dridu, Olbia, Ineu, Rarău, Nistru (Dniester) and Tisa (Tisza). Diplomatic contacts between a certain 11th century voivode (prince) named Vlad and following rulers are also mentioned (regnal years in brackets): Constantine Doukas (1059–1067), Alexios I Komnenos (1081–1118) and Robert of Flanders (which one, Robert I (1071–1093) or Robert II (1093–1111)?).

Quotations from Enăchiuc's translation include:

Solrgco zicjra naprzi olto co sesvil cas

"O Sun of the live let write what span the time"

Deteti lis vivit neglivlu iti iti itia niteren titius suonares imi urast ucen

"In great numbers, in the fierce battle, without fear go, go as a hero. Break ahead with great noise, to sweep away and defeat the Hungarian!"

On the one hand, Enăchiuc's proposition can be criticized for the method of transliteration. Symbols that characteristically appear in the same context throughout the codex are regularly transliterated with different letters, so that the patterns in the original code are lost in the transliteration. On the other hand, Enăchiuc is criticized as a linguist and historian. She provided the only linguistic source of a hitherto unknown state of the Romanian language, and her text (even with her glossary) raises such serious doubts both in its linguistic and historic authenticity that they render her work unscientific.

There is no relation between the illustrations of the manuscript (of clear Christian content) and Enăchiuc's translation.

=== Brahmi-Hindi hypothesis ===
Another alleged solution was made in 2004 by the Indian Mahesh Kumar Singh. He claims that the codex is written left-to-right, top-to-bottom with a so far undocumented variant of the Brahmi script. He transliterated the first 24 pages of the codex to get a Hindi text which was translated to Hungarian. His solution is mostly like the beginning of an apocryphal gospel (previously unknown), with a meditative prologue, then going on to the infancy narrative of Jesus.

According to Mahesh Kumar Singh, the upper two rows of page 1 read:

he bhagwan log bahoot garib yahan bimar aur bhookhe hai / inko itni sakti aur himmat do taki ye apne karmo ko pura kar sake "Oh, my God! Here the people is very poor, ill and starving, therefore give them sufficient potency and power that they may satisfy their needs."

Singh's attempt was immediately criticized in the next issue of the same journal. His transliteration lacks consistency.

=== 2010 to present ===
Benedek Láng summarized the previous attempts and the possible research directions in a 2010 article and in a 2011 book-sized monograph. He argued that the codex is not a hoax (as opposed to mainstream Hungarian academic opinion), but instead is a consciously encoded or enciphered text. It may be a cipher, a shorthand system, or a constructed language. Láng assessed these possibilities systematically in his publications with the help of historical analogies.

In 2010, Gábor Tokai published a series of three short articles in the Hungarian popular science weekly, Élet és Tudomány. Tokai tried to date the codex by finding historical analogies of the imagery of the drawings. Tokai could not rule out the possibility of a hoax, but he (like Locsmándi) insisted that whatever be the case, the text has regularities that strongly suggest a meaning. Several months later Tokai also published two further short articles in which he started to give meaning to specific code chunks. He based his arguments mainly on character strings that appear in pictures (such as the INRI inscription on the cross). He claimed to have identified the codes of the four evangelists in biblical references, built up of an evangelist's name and a number, possibly some kind of chapter number. Based on Gyürk's and Locsmándi's work he also showed that many of the four-digit numbers in the text are year numbers, using presumably a peculiar Anno Mundi epoch.

Simultaneous with, and independently from Tokai, Levente Zoltán Király made significant progress in describing some structural elements of the code. In 2011, he demonstrated a method for cutting down the text into sentences with a good probability. He identified a 7-page section split by numbered headings, with the whole section preceded by its table of contents. Like Tokai, Király also discovered the codes of the four evangelists, and in addition he provided a persuasive argument for a "chapter heading system" in the codex that contains biblical references. He also dealt with the overall structure of the codex, showing that the chapter structure is not present in the first fourth of the book, partly because that part contains the long, continuous narration of the passion of Jesus Christ.

In 2018, Tokai and Király published the paper Cracking the code of the Rohonc Codex. The paper claimed the writing was not a substitution cipher, or an ancient alphabet, but is in fact a 'code system'. According to Tokai and Király, the code system does not indicate the inner structure of words. They claim that the codex contains the date 1593 CE as a probable reference to its writing. They also state that by character it is an ordinary Catholic reader or breviary of the time, mostly containing paraphrases of New Testament texts (primarily from the Gospels), but also some non-Biblical material, like e.g. Seth returning to the gate of Paradise, or prayers to the Virgin Mary.

== See also ==
- Voynich manuscript
- Codex Seraphinianus
