= Câmpulung Moldovenesc =

- Municipality
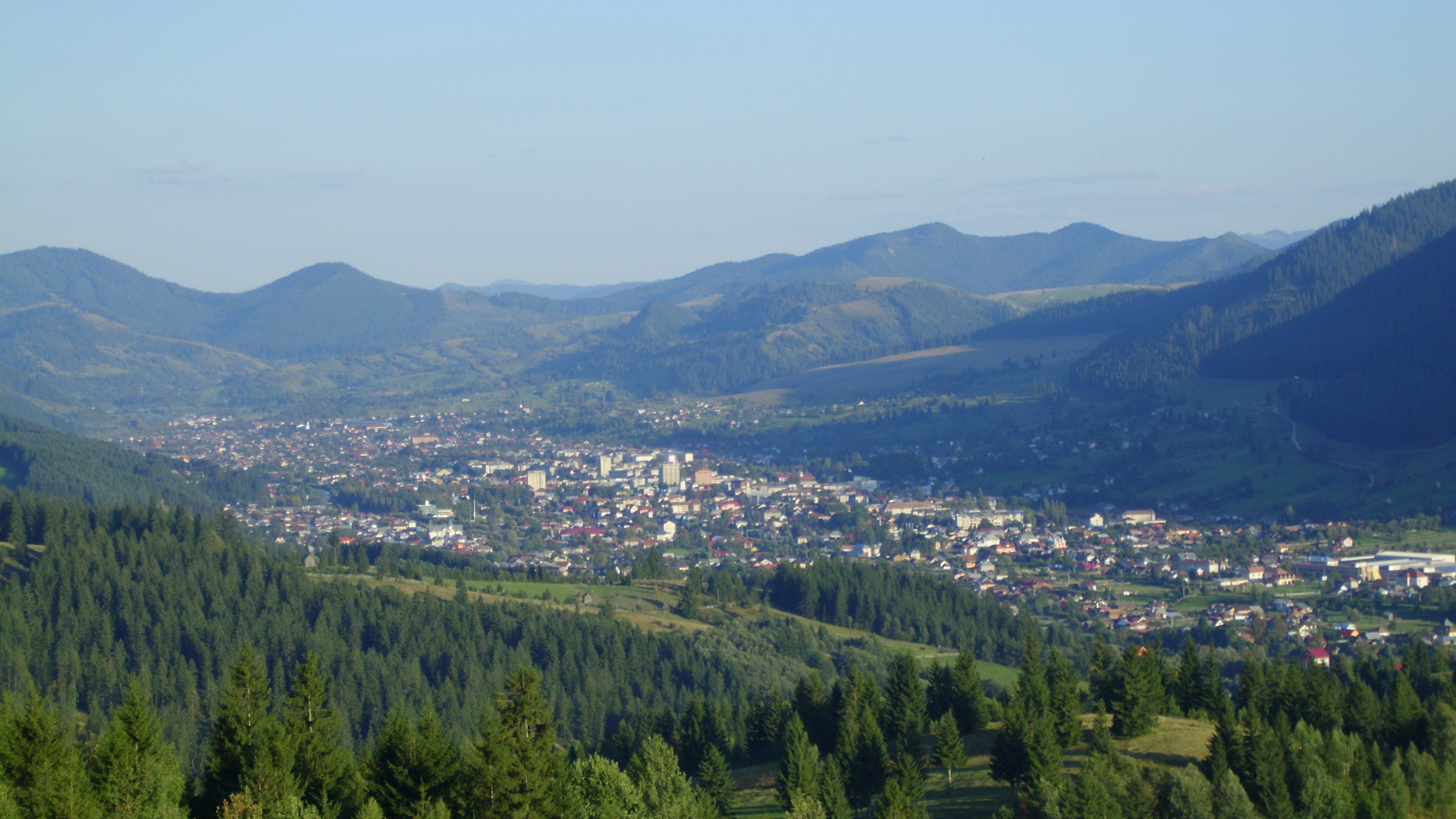
- View of the town from Obcina Feredeului

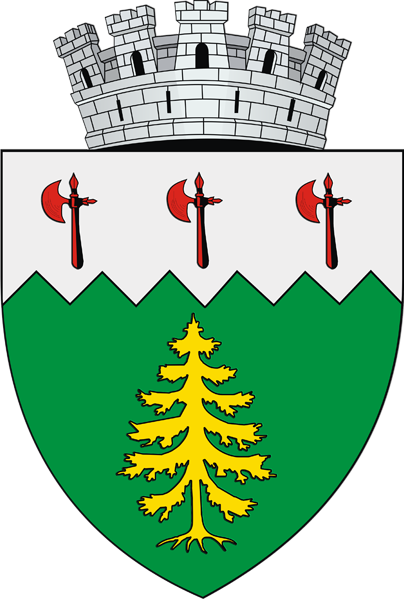
- Coat of arms

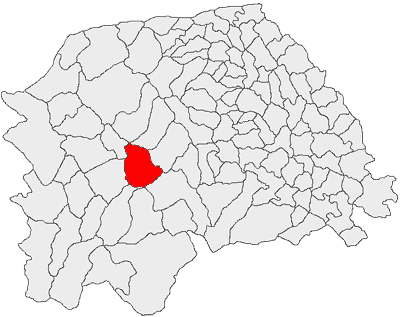
- Location in Suceava County

- Location in Romania
- Coordinates: 47°31′51″N 25°33′5″E
- Country: Romania
- County: Suceava

Government
  - Mayor (2024–2028): Mihăiță Negură (PNL)
- Area: 147 km^{2} (57 sq mi)
- Elevation: 600 m (2,000 ft)
- Population (2021-12-01): 15,642
  - Density: 106/km^{2} (276/sq mi)
- Time zone: UTC+02:00 (EET)
  - Summer (DST): UTC+03:00 (EEST)
- Postal code: 725100
- Area code: (+40) 02 30
- Vehicle reg.: SV
- Website: www.campulungmoldovenesc.ro

Câmpulung Moldovenesc (Romanian pronunciation: [kɨmpuˌluŋɡ moldoveˈnesk]; formerly spelled Cîmpulung Moldovenesc) is a city in Suceava County, northeastern Romania. It is situated in the historical regions of Bukovina and Moldavia.

Câmpulung Moldovenesc is the fourth largest urban settlement in the county, with a population of 15,642 inhabitants, according to the 2021 census. It was declared a municipality in 1995, along with two other towns in Suceava County, more specifically Fălticeni and Rădăuți. Câmpulung Moldovenesc covers an area of 147 km^{2} (57 sq mi) and it was the capital of former Câmpulung County (until 1950).

== Name ==
"Câmpulung" means "Long Field" in Romanian. Moldovenesc ("Moldavian") is used to differentiate between this town and Câmpulung Muscel (Argeș County, Wallachia). The town is also known as Moldovahosszúmező in Hungarian, Kimpolung or Kimpulung in German, Kimpulung Moldovanesk (Кимпулунг Молдованеск) or Dovhopillja (Довгопілля) in Ukrainian, קאָמפּעלונג ("Kimpulung") in Yiddish, and Kimpulung Mołdawski in Polish.

== Geography ==
Câmpulung Moldovenesc is situated in the region of Bukovina, in north-eastern Romania. The city is located in the mountain area of the Bukovinian Subcarpathians known as Obcinele Bucovinei, on the banks of the Moldova River.

The city is accessible by both car and train. The European route E58, that links the region of Moldavia with Transylvania, crosses the city. There are two railway stations located in the city: Câmpulung Moldovenesc in the city center and Câmpulung Est in Capu Satului neighborhood.

There are many places of interest located in and around Câmpulung Moldovenesc, such as the Rarău peak in the Rarău Massif and the Giumalău peak in the Giumalău Massif, which at 1,650 m (5,410 ft) and 1,857 m (6,093 ft) are the highest peaks in the region. One can also enjoy the forests which surround Câmpulung Moldovenesc or visit a monastery in one of the nearby villages.

=== Climate ===
The city has a temperate continental climate with moderate characteristics, because of the shelter provided by the surrounding mountain ranges. Winters are relatively long and snowy, but not excessively harsh, while summers are cool and characterized by abundant precipitation. Snowfall usually occurs from October through the end of April. The average annual precipitation is 690 mm, while the average annual temperature is 6.8 °C.

The highest temperature ever recorded is 36.0 °C (96.8 °F) on 15 August 1954, while the lowest is −33.9 °C (−29.0 °F), measured on 11 January 1940.

Climate data for Câmpulung Moldovenesc (elevation 659m, 1961–2005 normals, extremes 1961–2000)
Month	Jan	Feb	Mar	Apr	May	Jun	Jul	Aug	Sep	Oct	Nov	Dec	Year
Record high °C (°F)	15.0 (59.0)	20.0 (68.0)	25.1 (77.2)	28.0 (82.4)	31.2 (88.2)	33.0 (91.4)	34.3 (93.7)	36.0 (96.8)	34.2 (93.6)	28.2 (82.8)	21.8 (71.2)	16.4 (61.5)	36.0 (96.8)
Daily mean °C (°F)	−4.2 (24.4)	−2.6 (27.3)	0.8 (33.4)	6.4 (43.5)	12.1 (53.8)	15.3 (59.5)	16.6 (61.9)	15.9 (60.6)	11.9 (53.4)	7.1 (44.8)	2.0 (35.6)	−2.3 (27.9)	6.6 (43.8)
Record low °C (°F)	−33.9 (−29.0)	−29.1 (−20.4)	−25.5 (−13.9)	−23.6 (−10.5)	−9.6 (14.7)	−4.0 (24.8)	0.5 (32.9)	1.4 (34.5)	−5.6 (21.9)	−14.5 (5.9)	−20.8 (−5.4)	−31.7 (−25.1)	−33.9 (−29.0)
Average precipitation mm (inches)	24.7 (0.97)	24.5 (0.96)	29.6 (1.17)	52.3 (2.06)	93.2 (3.67)	114.3 (4.50)	113.0 (4.45)	94.1 (3.70)	52.7 (2.07)	35.5 (1.40)	30.2 (1.19)	25.5 (1.00)	689.6 (27.14)
Source 1: Licențiada (1961-2000), Infoclimat, mmediu.ro (1961-2005)
Source 2: Ecoteca, georeview.usv.ro

== History ==
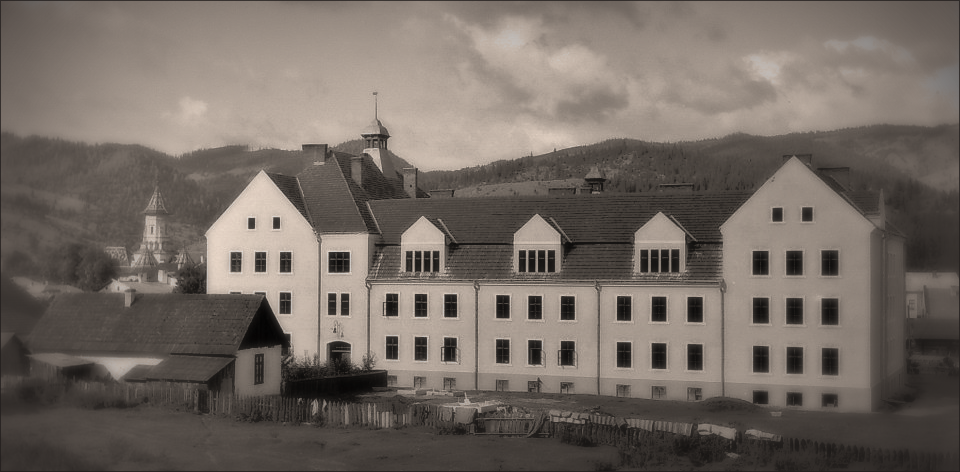
Dragoș Vodă High School in Câmpulung Moldovenesc in 1915

The first written mention of the village of Câmpulung Moldovenesc dates back to April 14, 1411. At that time, the ruling prince of Moldavia was Alexandru cel Bun. Dimitrie Cantemir, in his well-known work Descriptio Moldaviae, mentions Ocolul Câmpulung, an autonomous region in northern Moldavia that has its own rules and leaders. This region consisted of 15 villages. During the late Middle Ages, as the medieval town of Suceava and other neighbouring towns in the region of Moldavia (the highlands of the region more specifically or what would later constitute Bukovina), Câmpulung Moldovenesc operated under the Magdeburg law (German: Das Mageburger Recht).

Together with the rest of Bukovina, Câmpulung Moldovenesc was under the rule of the Habsburg monarchy (later Austria-Hungary) from 1775 to 1918. Câmpulung was in the Austrian part of the empire after the compromise of 1867, head of the district with the same name, one of the 9 Bezirkshauptmannschaften in Bukovina province. Other main district cities were Dorna Watra (Vatra Dornei) and Wama (Vama) in 1900.

After the Union of Bukovina with Romania at the end of World War I, the town became part of the Kingdom of Romania. Later, between 1925 and 1950, Câmpulung Moldovenesc was the capital of the former Câmpulung County, the most extensive county in Bukovina. The spa and ski resort Vatra Dornei was the second most important town in Câmpulung County. Following the administrative reforms implemented by the communist regime in 1950, the city became part of Suceava Region, while in 1968 it became part of Suceava County. In the fall of 1941, 6,118 Jews, almost the entire Jewish population of Campulung County/Judet, was deported to Transnistria. A Romanian official document from 1946 suggests that most Jews in Campulung County survived the Holocaust. The number of Jews who died in Transnistria or did not return to their domicile in the county from there was listed as 1,076, which represented roughly 17.6% of the Jews who were deported, which should be seen as the minimum number of the dead. The survival rate was higher than the 70% or more than 70% of the southern Bukovinian Jews who survived the deportations to Transnistria. On March 14, 1944, Romania's military dictator Ion Antonescu allowed the repatriation of all the Jews deported to Transnistria.

== Administration and local politics ==
=== Town council ===
The town's former local council had the following political composition, according to the results of the 2020 Romanian local elections:

Party	Seats	Current Council
National Liberal Party (PNL)	12	
Save Romania Union (USR)	2	
Social Democratic Party (PSD)	2	
People's Movement Party (PMP)	2	
PRO Romania (PRO)	1	

The town's former local council had the following political composition, according to the results of the 2024 Romanian local elections:

Party	Seats	Current Council
National Liberal Party (PNL)	10	
Social Democratic Party (PSD)	3	
United Right Alliance (ADU)	3	
Alliance for the Union of Romanians (AUR)	2	
Greater Romania Party (PRM)	1	

== Culture ==
Câmpulung Moldovenesc has the Wooden Spoons Museum, a museum that displays the wooden spoons collection of the deceased history professor Ion Țugui.

== Demographics ==
Historical population
Year	Pop.	±%
1910	8,784	—
1930	10,071	+14.7%
1948	11,041	+9.6%
1956	13,627	+23.4%
1966	15,031	+10.3%
1977	18,648	+24.1%
1992	22,143	+18.7%
2002	20,041	−9.5%
2011	16,105	−19.6%
2021	15,642	−2.9%
Source: Austrian and Romanian census data and/or official estimates

Câmpulung Moldovenesc reached its peak population in 1992, when more than 22,000 people were living within the city limits. As of 2016, the town of Câmpulung Moldovenesc was the fourth largest urban settlement in Suceava County, after the county capital, Suceava, and the larger towns of Rădăuți and Fălticeni.

At the 2011 census, Câmpulung Moldovenesc had a population of 16,105 inhabitants, as follows: 99.08% of inhabitants were ethnic Romanians, 0.25% Germans (Bukovina Germans), 0.22% Roma, 0.17% Ukrainians, and 0.09% Hungarians. At the 2021 census, the city had a population of 15,642.

== Economy ==
The main industries in Câmpulung Moldovenesc are dairy products, lumber, and ecotourism. Part of the city inhabitants works in agriculture and bovine growth.

== Natives ==
- Brîndușa Armanca (born 1954), journalist and academic
- Maria Diaconescu (born 1937), javelin thrower
- Vasile Gheorghiu (1872–1959), theology professor, academician
- Marian Kielec (born 1942), Polish footballer
- Leibu Levin (1914–1983), narrator of Yiddish literature, singer and composer
- Anca Parghel (1957–2008), jazz singer, musician
- Daniel Popescu (born 1981), politician
- Ion Ștefureac (1871–1920), professor, architect
- Adrian Ursache (born 1974), Reichsbürger movement activist, Mister Germany 1998 and convicted criminal

== Gallery ==
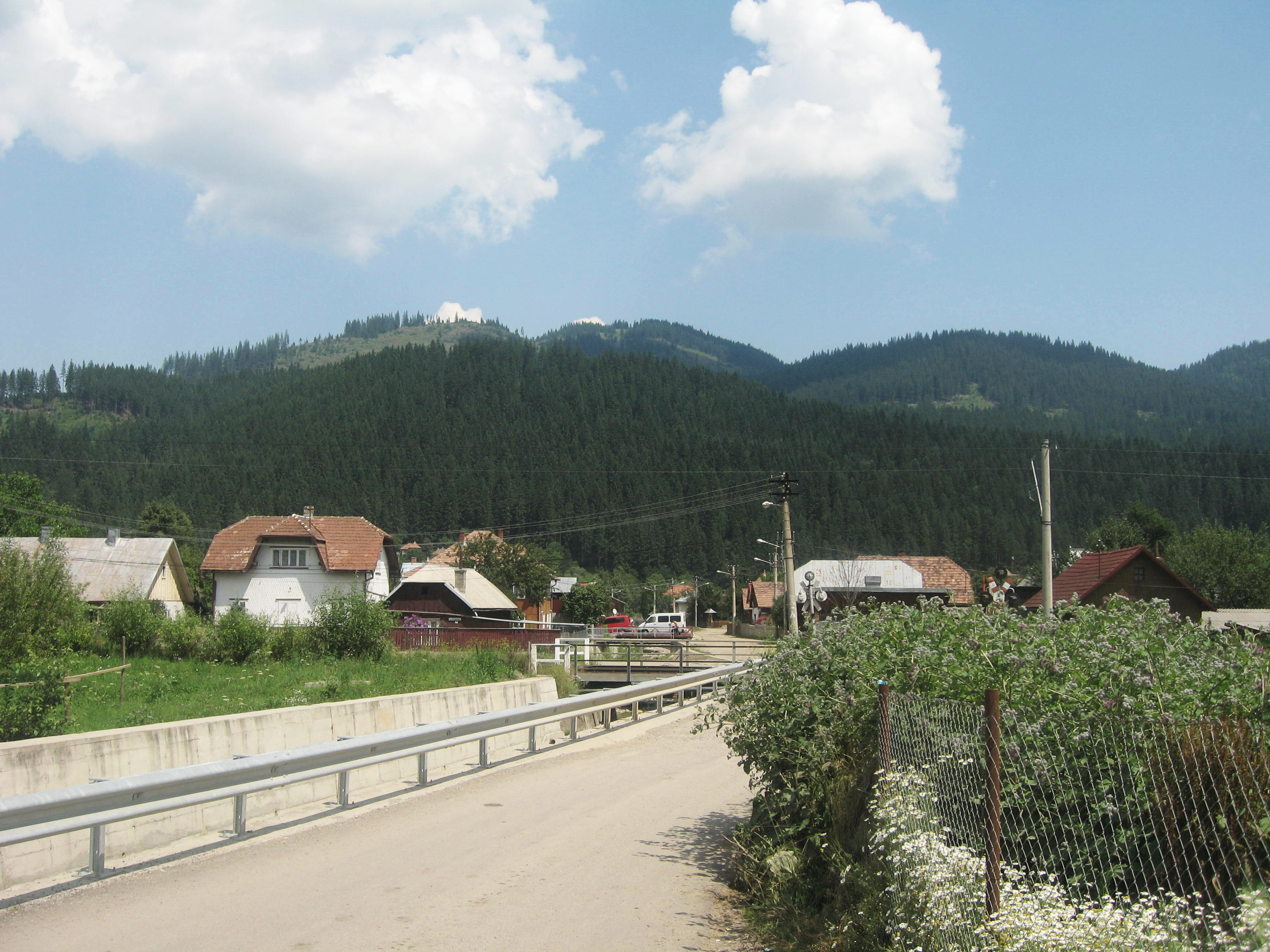
Mountainous landscape near the town

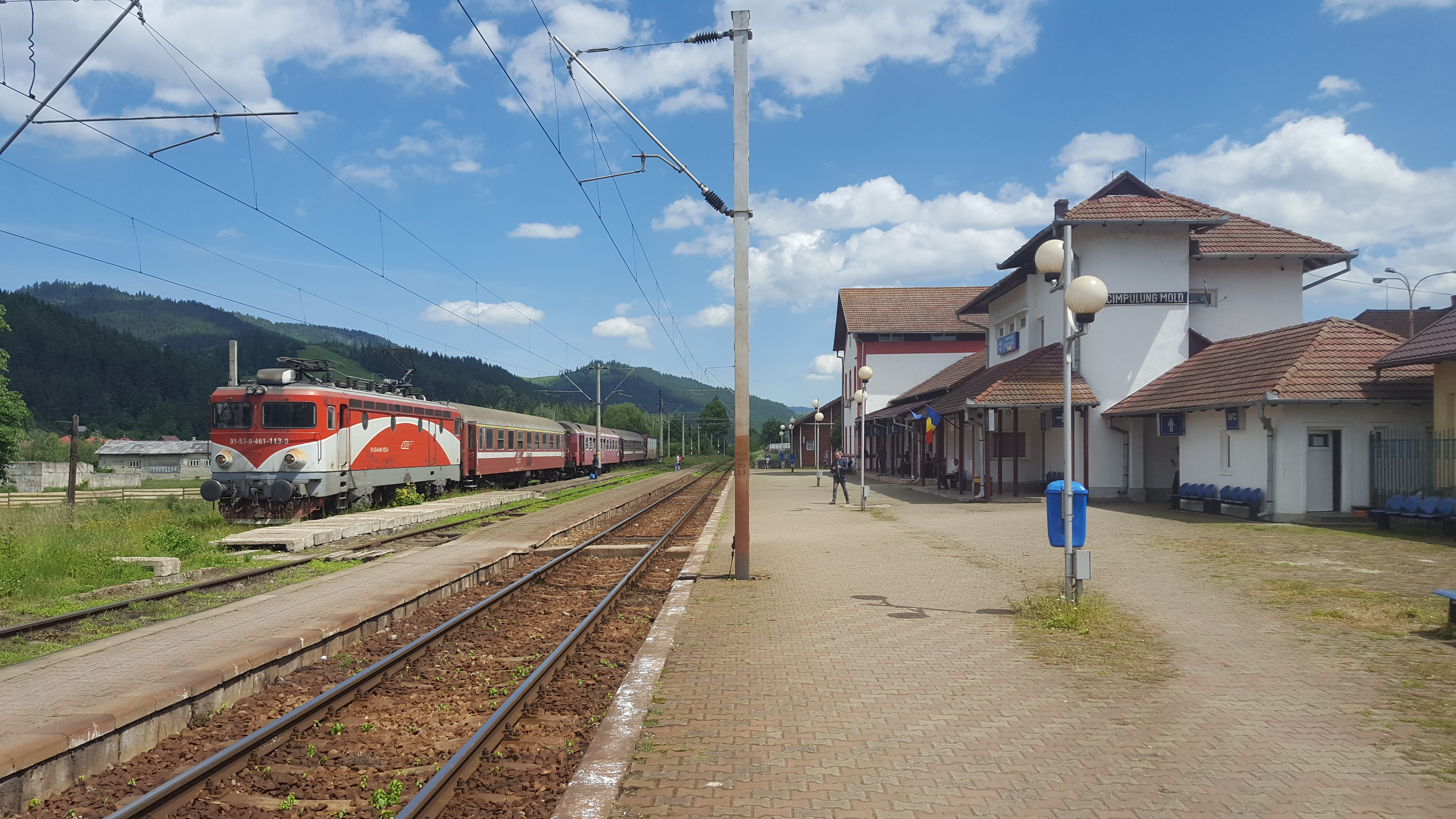
Central train station

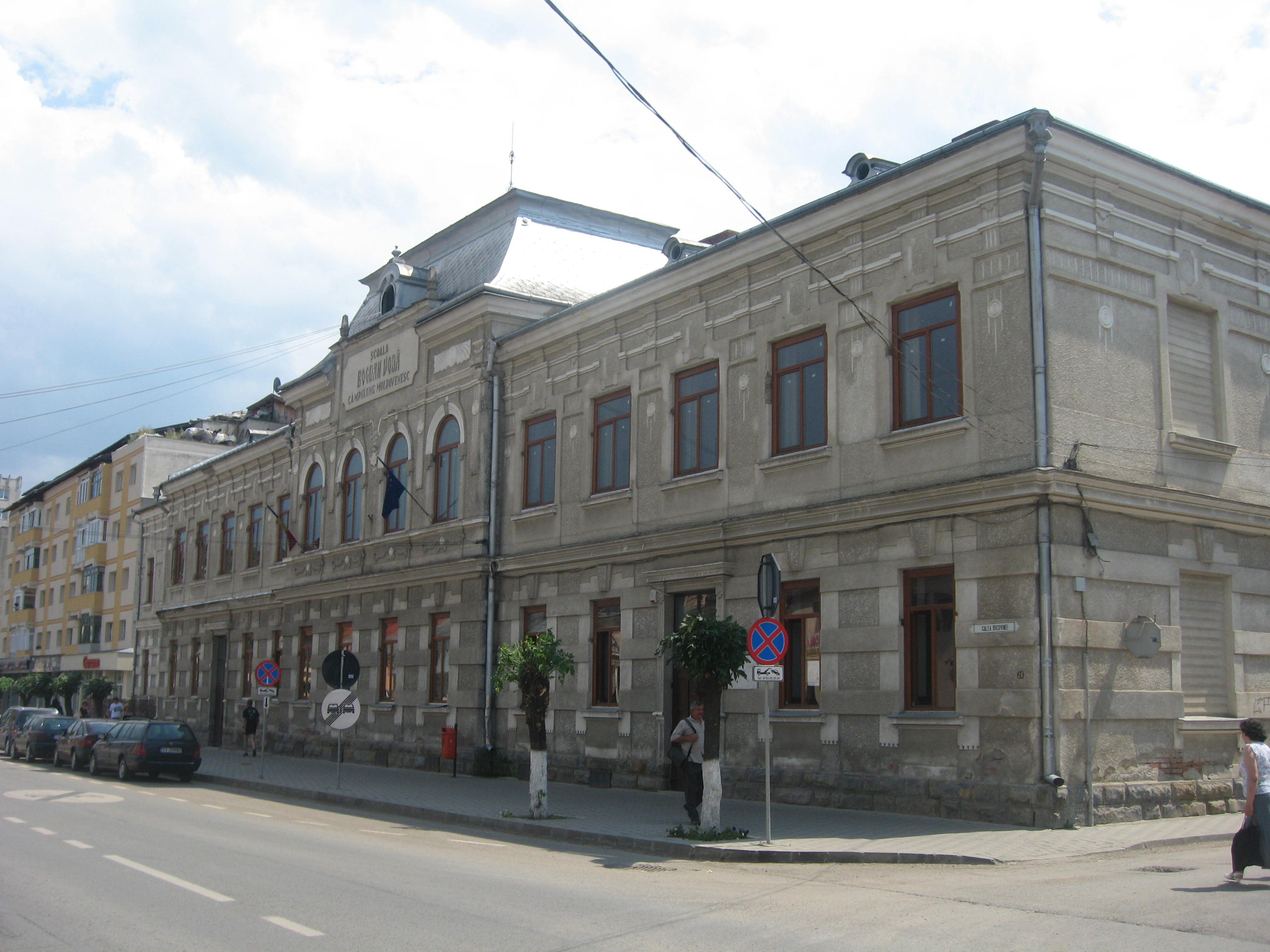
Bogdan Vodă School

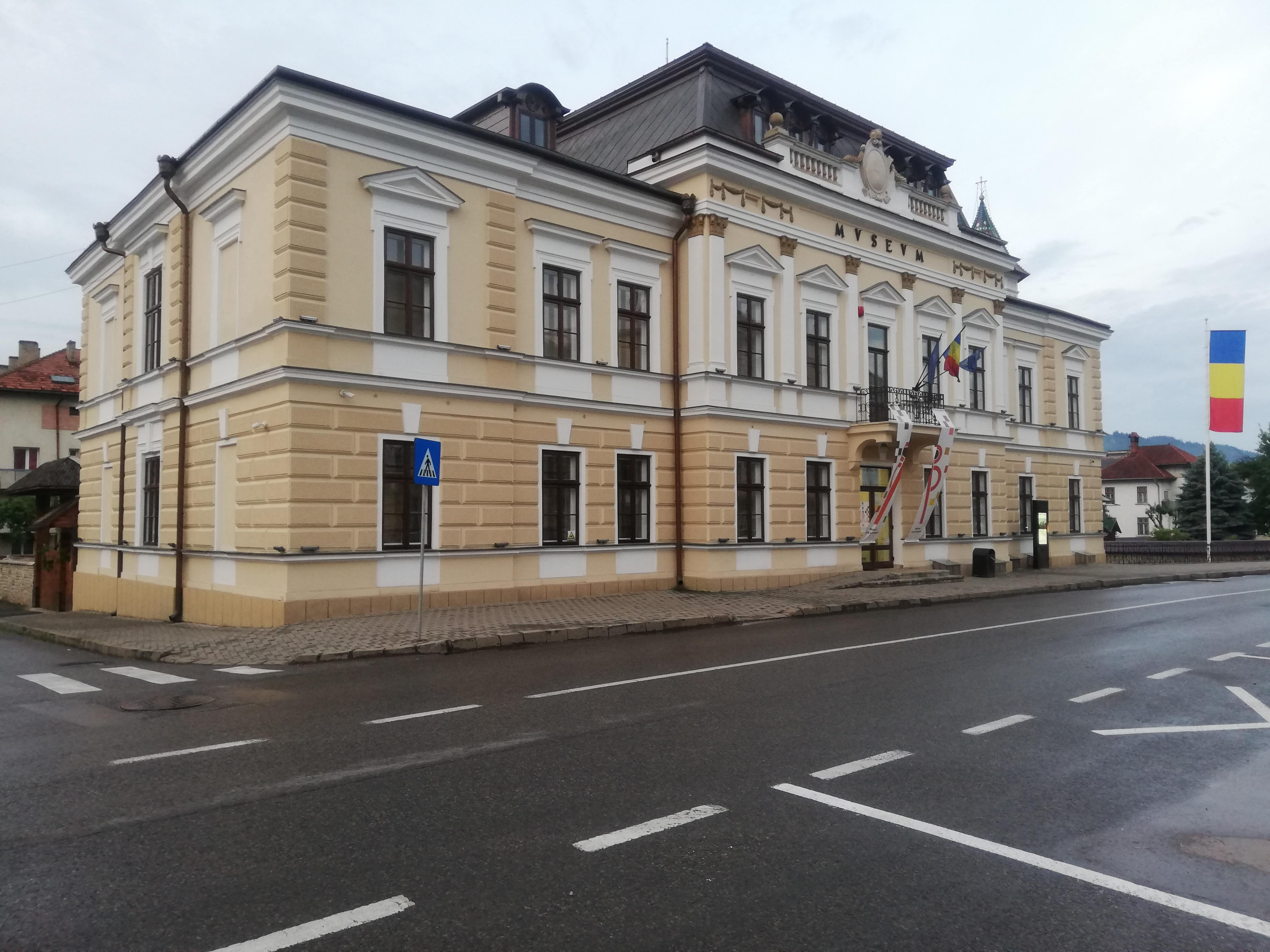
Wood Art Museum

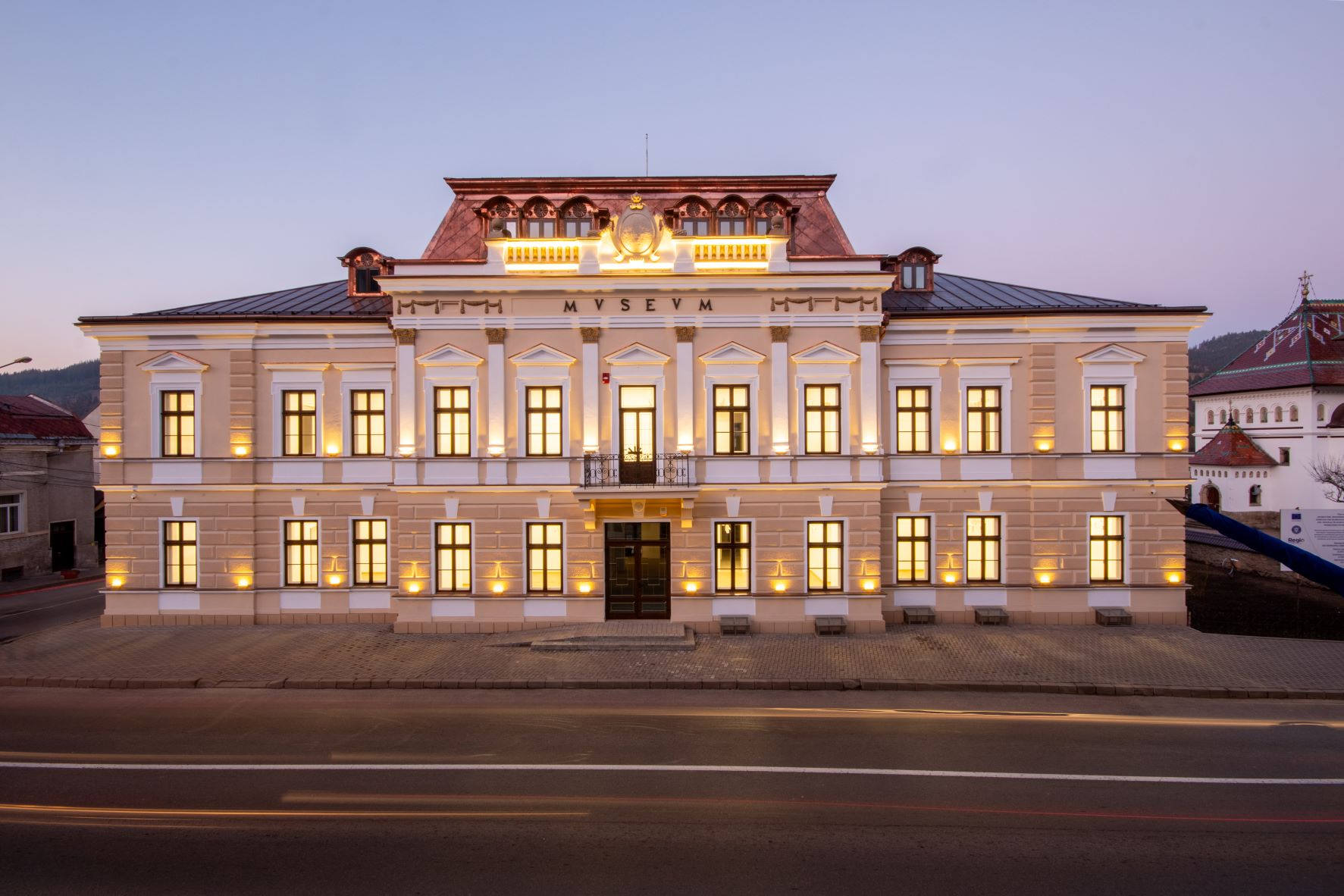
Wood Art Museum

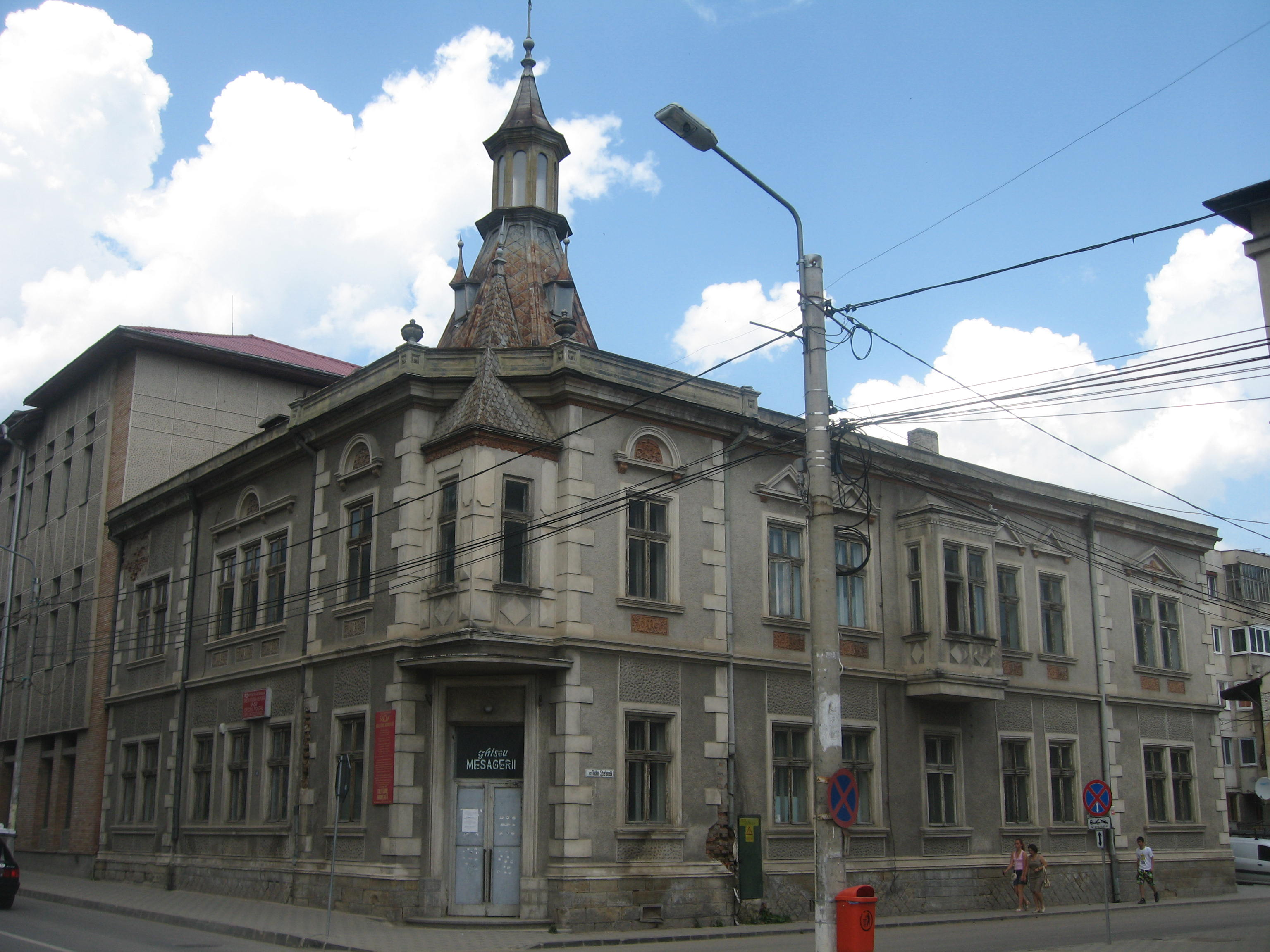
The post office

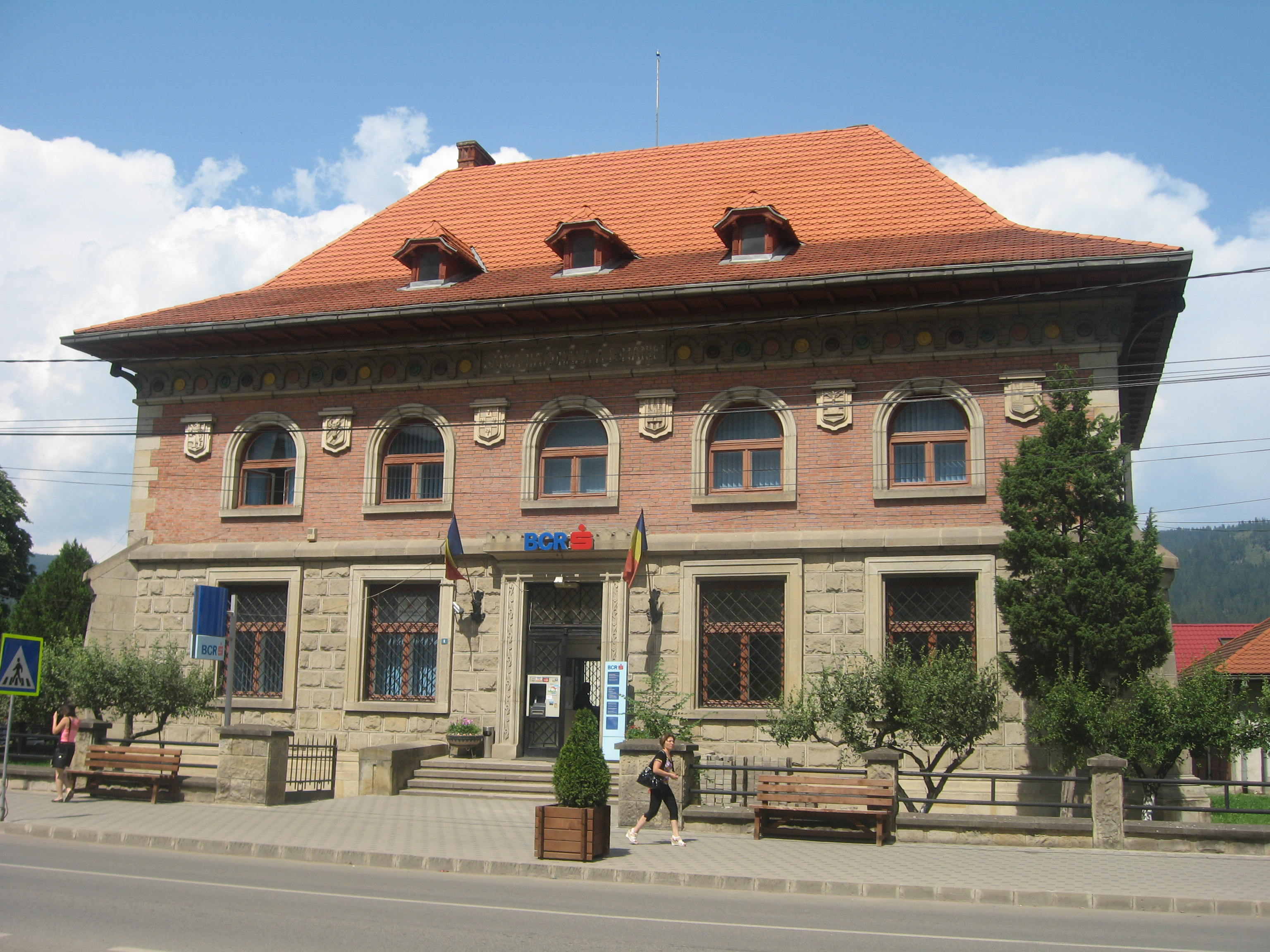
The Romanian Commercial Bank

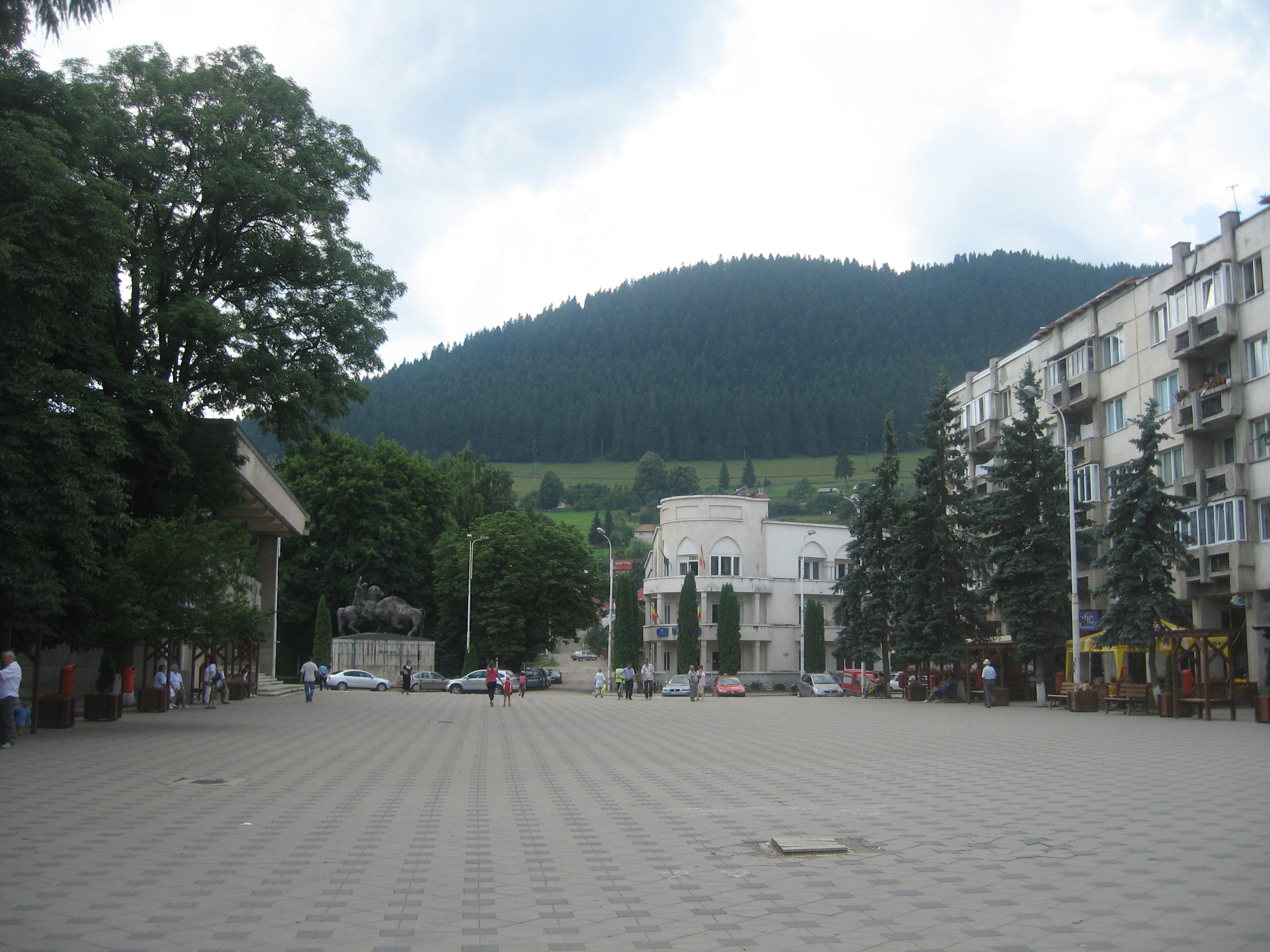
Central square in Câmpulung Moldovenesc

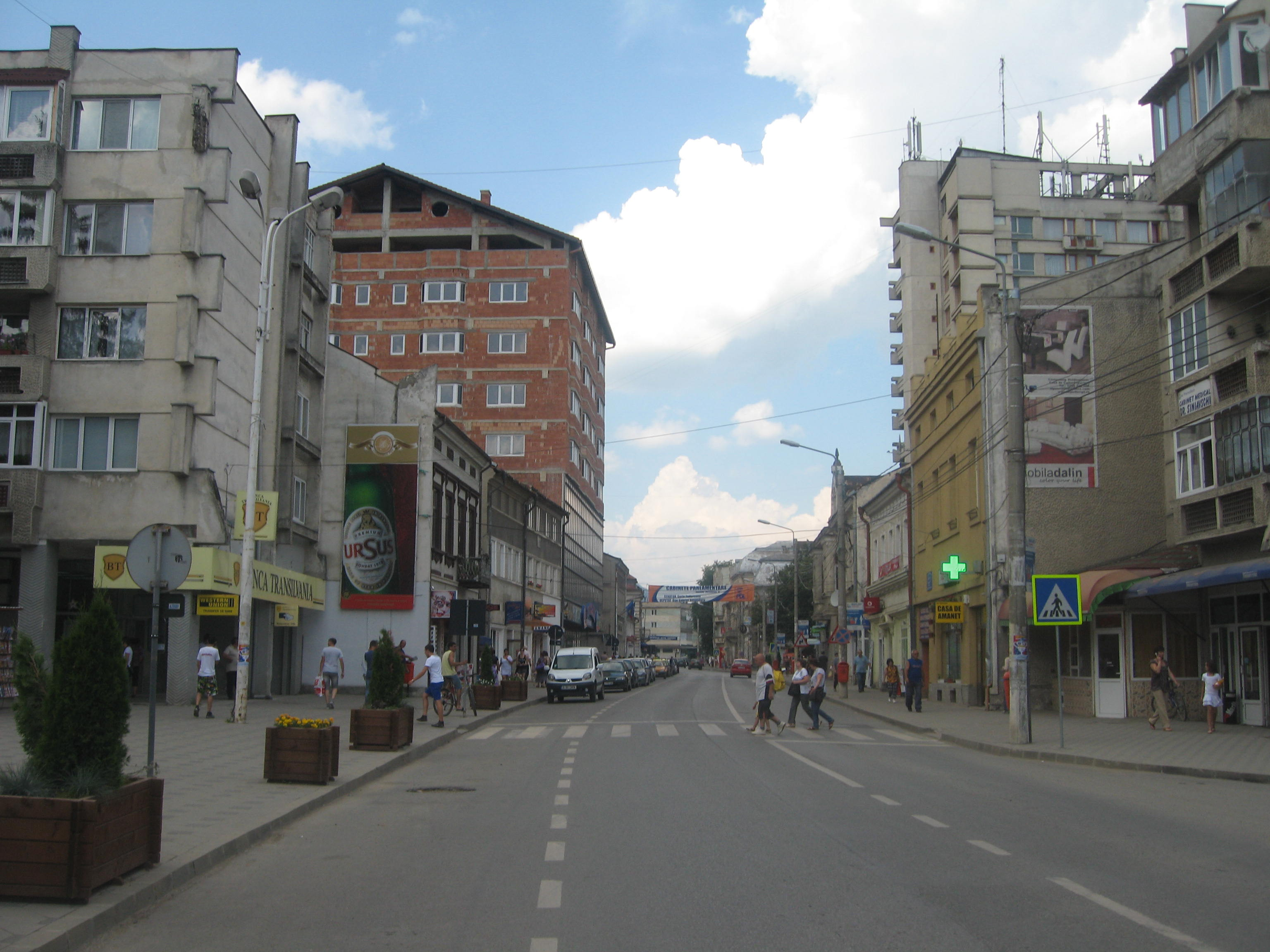
Downtown Câmpulung Moldovenesc

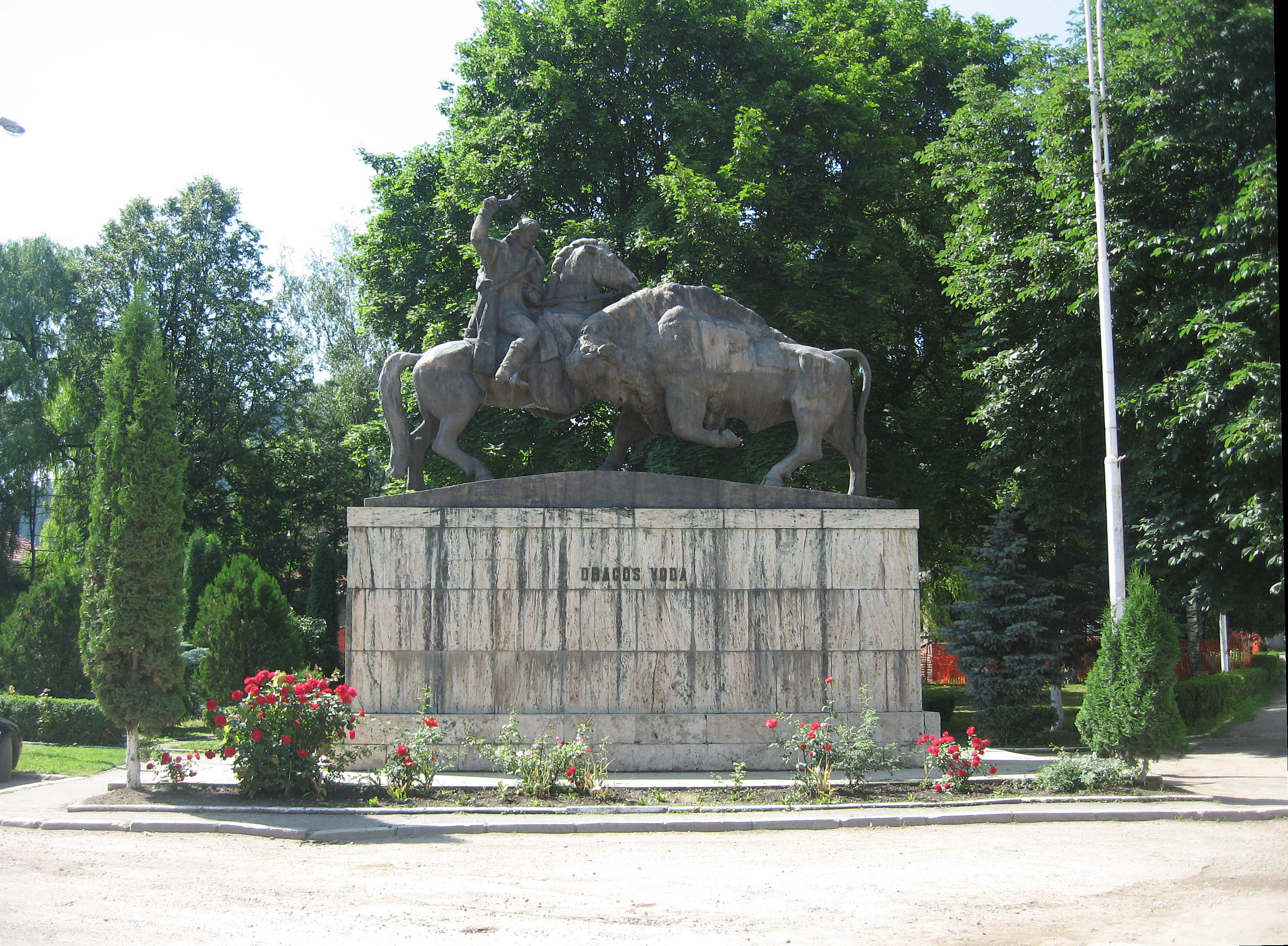
Dragoș Vodă and the Bison Statue

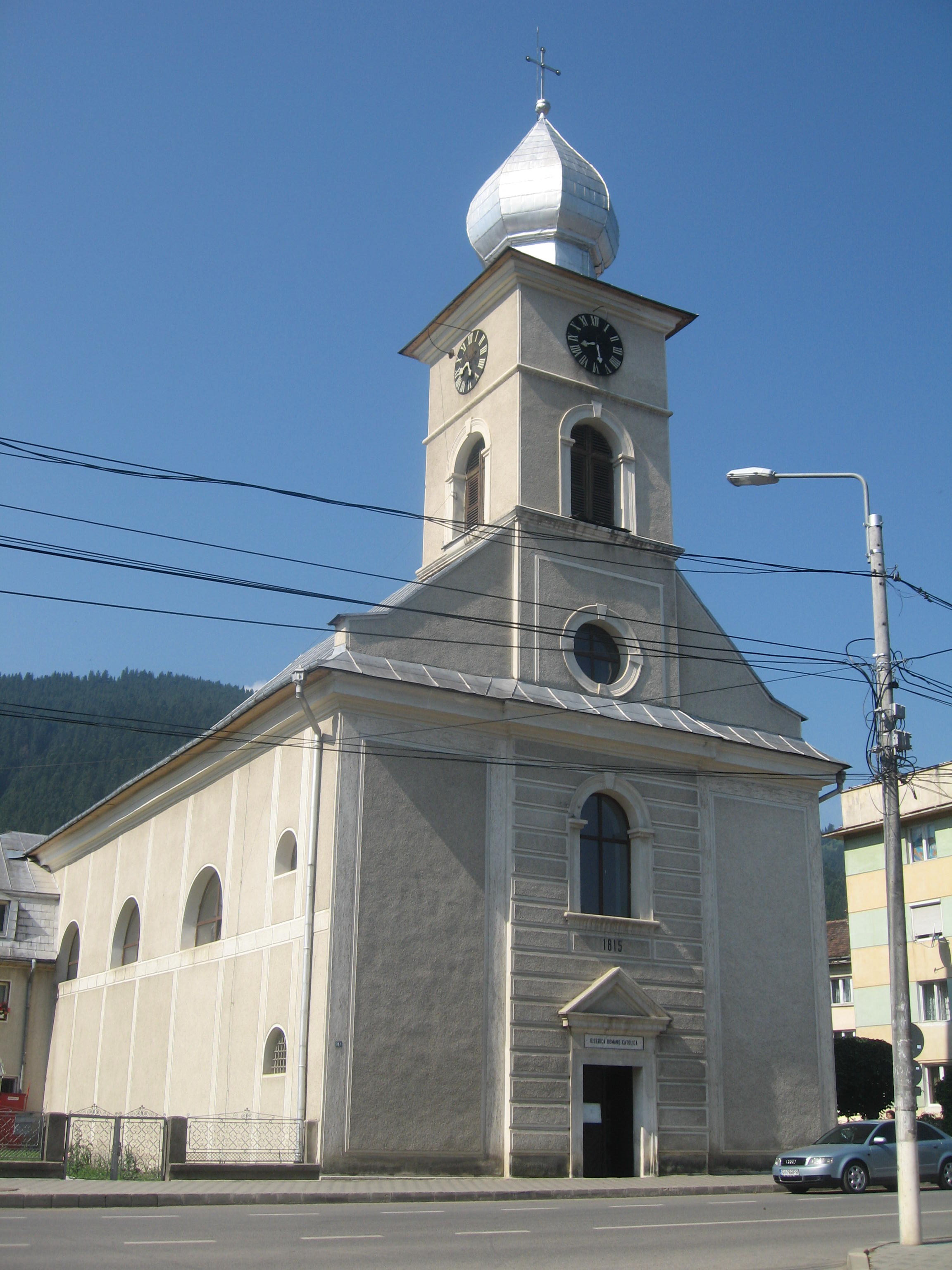
The Roman Catholic Church

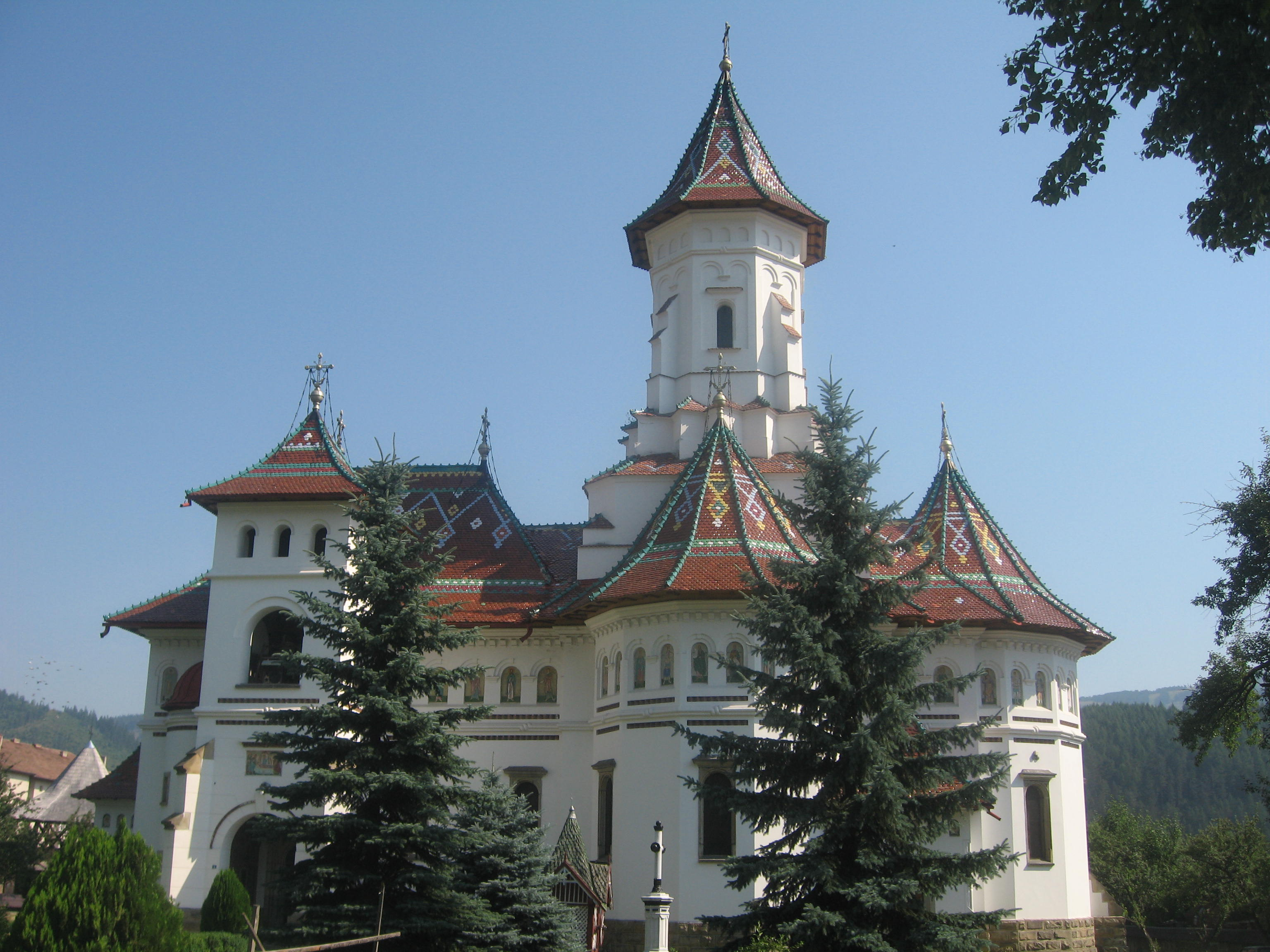
The Orthodox Cathedral

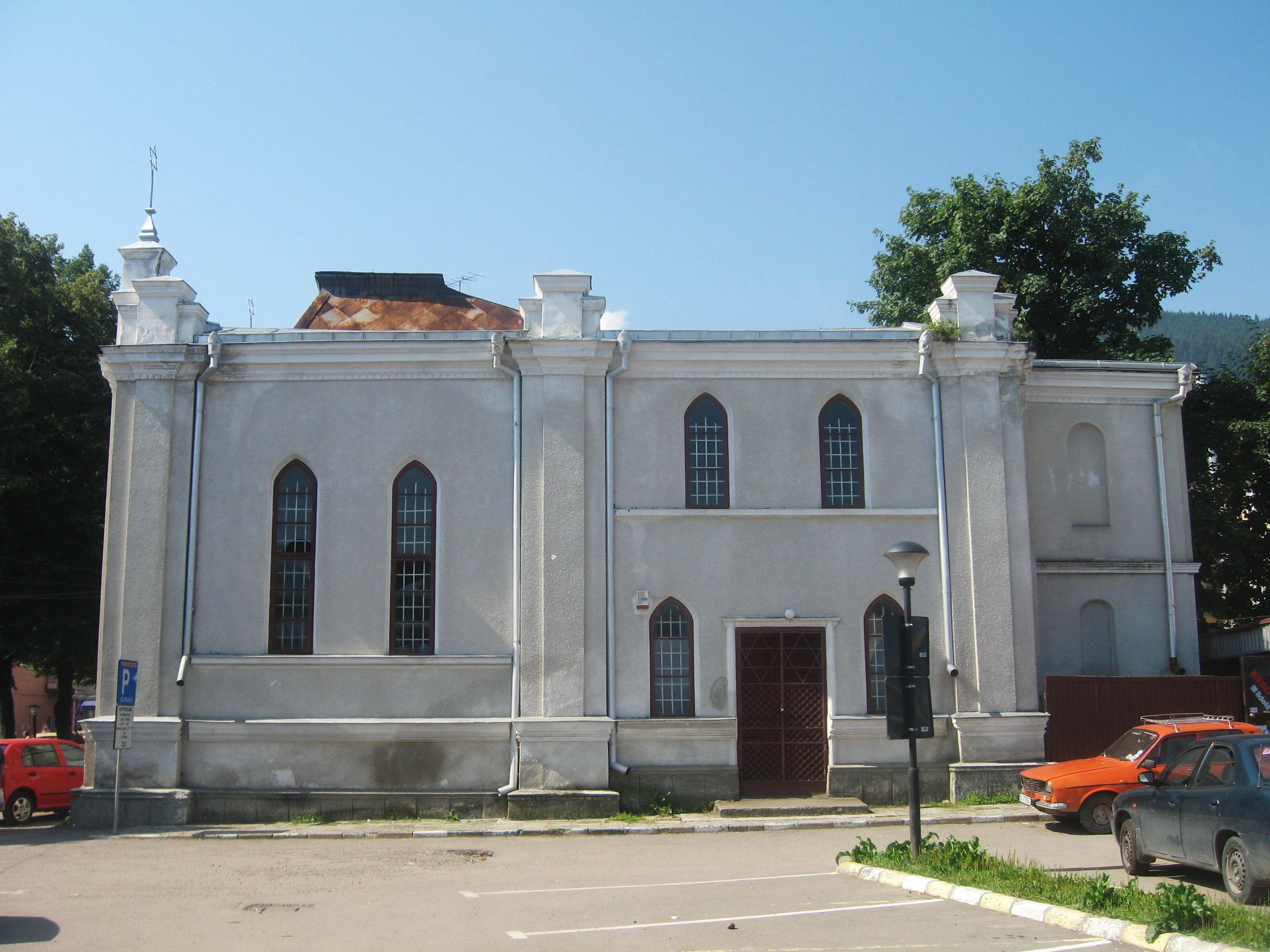
Havre Gah Jewish Temple
