= Câmpulung County =

Județul Câmpulung
- County (Județ)
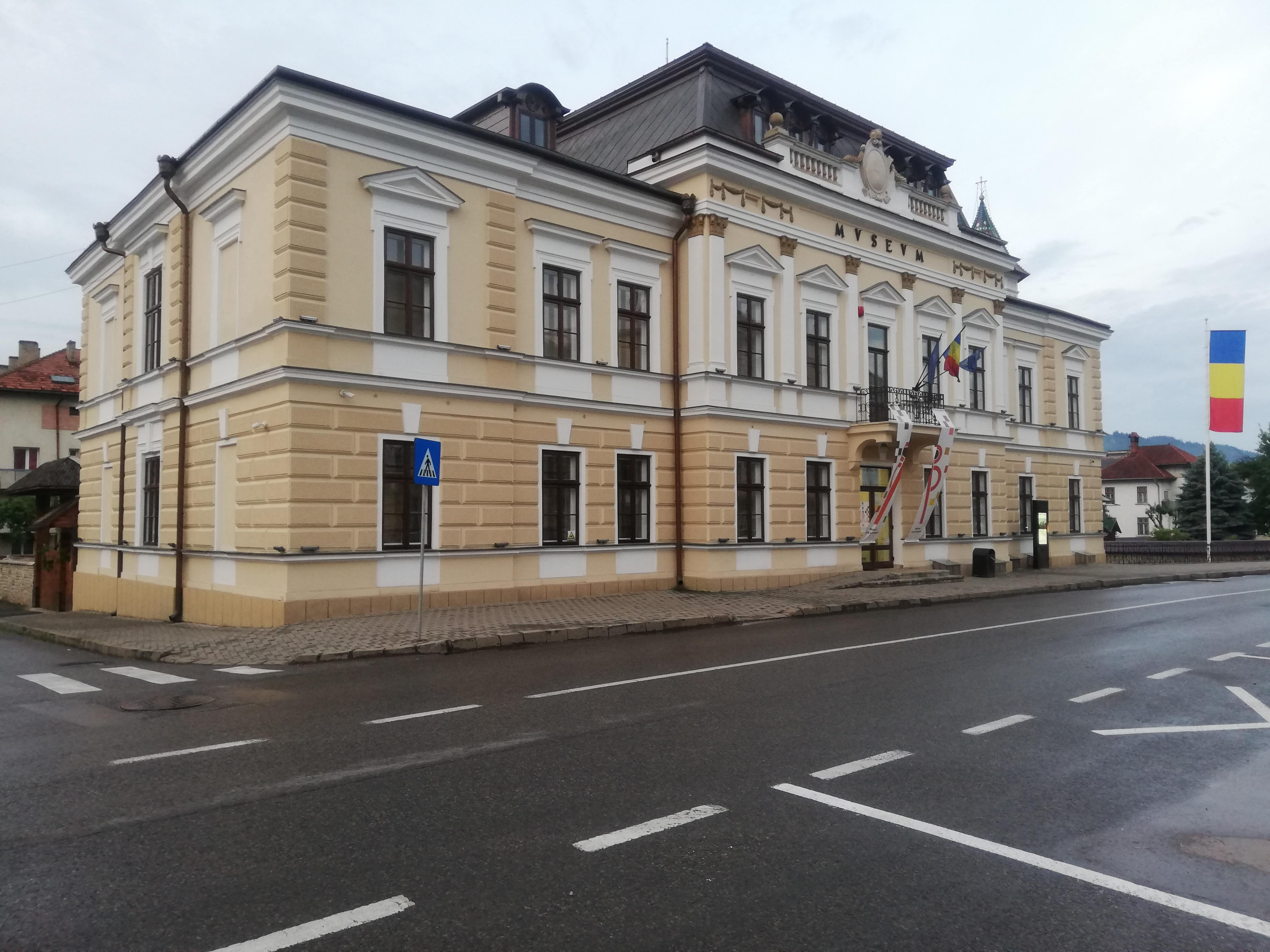
- Câmpulung County prefecture building of the interwar period, currently used as a museum.

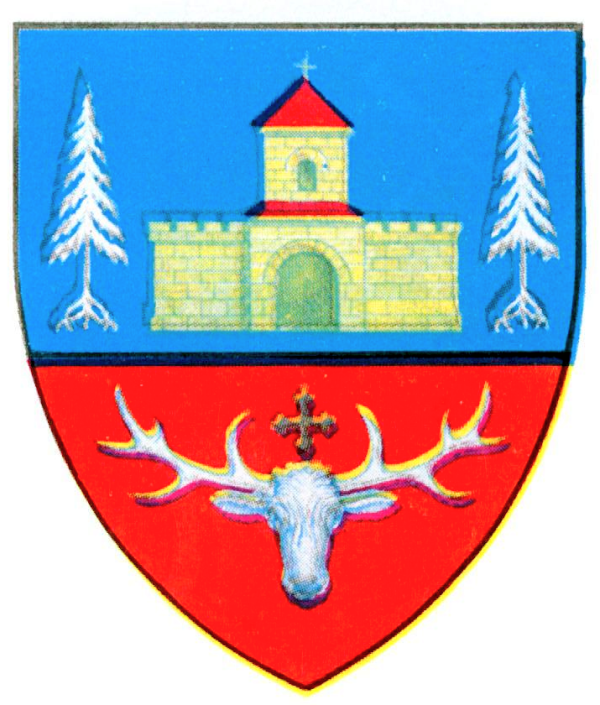
- Coat of arms

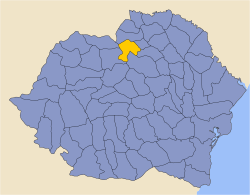
- Country: Romania
- Historic region: Bukovina
- Capital city (Reședință de județ): Câmpulung Moldovenesc
- Established: 1925
- Ceased to exist: Administrative reform of 1950

Area
  - Total: 2,349 km^{2} (907 sq mi)

Population (1930)
  - Total: 94,816
- Time zone: UTC+2 (EET)
  - Summer (DST): UTC+3 (EEST)

Câmpulung County is one of the historic counties of the Kingdom of Romania, in the historical region of Bukovina. The county seat was Câmpulung Moldovenesc.

== Geography ==
Câmpulung County covered 2,349 km^{2} and was located in the northern part of Greater Romania, in the southern part of Bukovina. Currently, the territory that comprised Câmpulung County is now included at present in Suceava County. In the interwar period, the county was bordered by Rădăuți County to the north, Suceava County to the east, Baia County to the southeast, Neamț and Mureș Counties to the south, and Năsăud County to the west.

== History ==
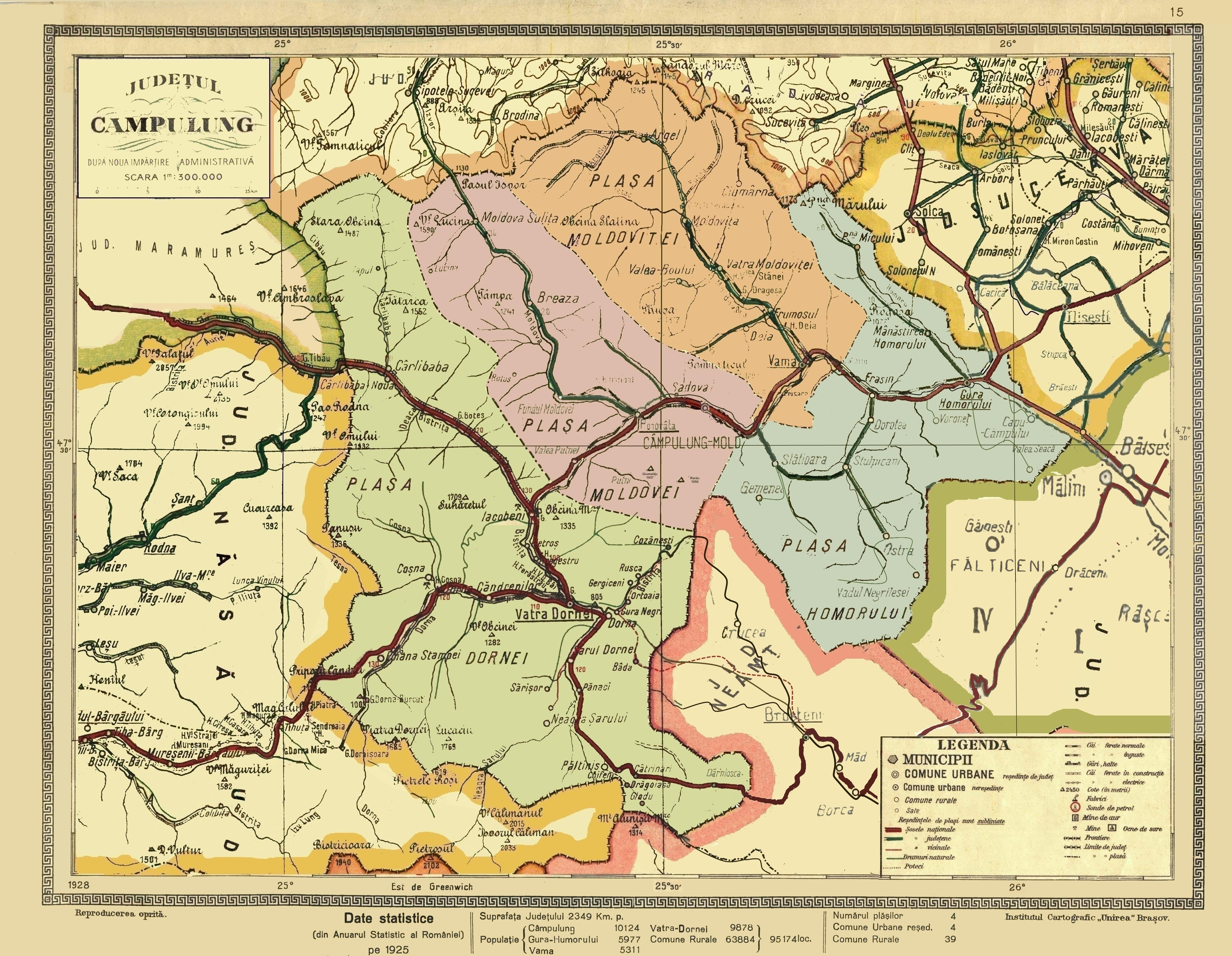
Câmpulung County as constituted in 1928

After World War I, the territory of the county along with most of Transylvania was transferred from Austria-Hungary to Romania. This transfer was confirmed in the 1920 Treaty of Trianon. Based on the 1923 Romanian Constitution and the Law of Administrative Unification of 1925, Câmpulung County was established, with its capital at Câmpulung Moldovenesc. In 1938, the county was disestablished and incorporated into the newly formed Ținutul Suceava, but it was re-established in 1940 after the fall of Carol II's regime. In World War II, the county was part of the Bukovina Governorate and was later invaded and occupied by Soviet forces.

In the fall of 1941, 6,118 Jews, almost the entire Jewish population of Campulung County/Judet, was deported to Transnistria. A Romanian official document from 1946 suggests that most Jews in Campulung County survived the Holocaust. The number of Jews who died in Transnistria or did not return to their domicile in the county from there was listed as 1,076, which represented roughly 17.6% of the Jews who were deported. The survival rate was higher than the 70% or more than 70% of the southern Bukovinian Jews who survived the deportations to Transnistria. On March 14, 1944, Romania's military dictator Ion Antonescu allowed the repatriation of all the Jews deported to Transnistria.

Following the administrative and territorial reform of 1950, made after the Soviet model, all counties were abolished and regions and districts established. The territory of the county then became part of Suceava Region. On 17 February 1968 the administrative and territorial divisions were returned to counties, but Câmpulung County was not re-established.

== Administrative organization ==
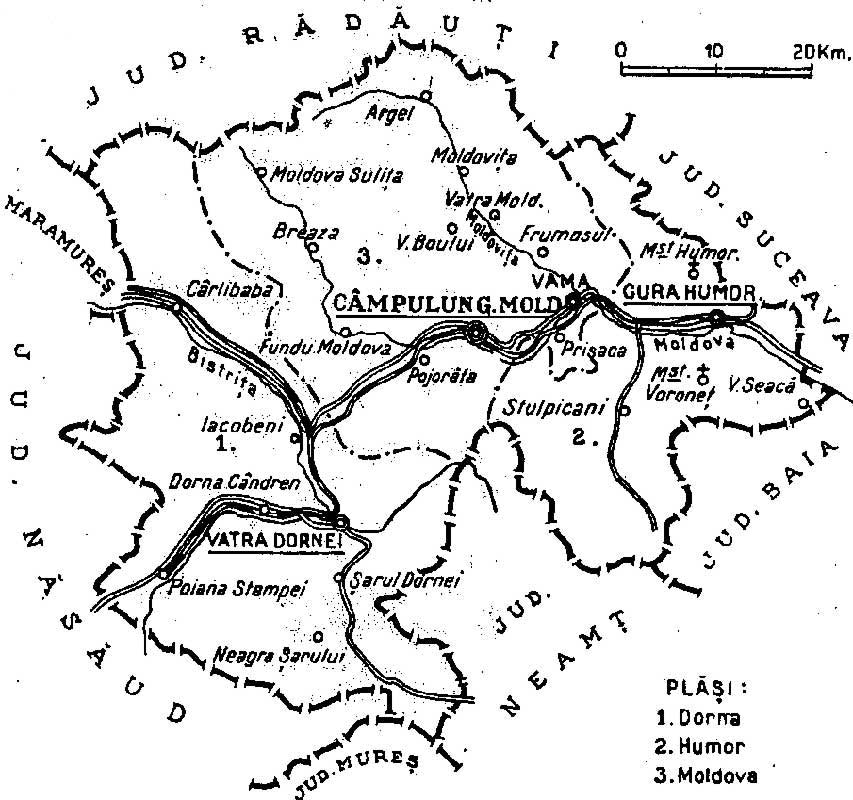
Map of Câmpulung County as constituted in 1938.

Administratively, Câmpulung County was originally divided into three districts (plăși):

1. Plasa Dorna, headquartered at Vatra Dornei
2. Plasa Humor, headquartered at Gura Humorului
3. Plasa Moldova, headquartered at Câmpulung Moldovenesc

Later, a fourth district was carved out from Plasa Moldova:

4. Plasa Moldovița, headquartered at Vama

There were four urban localities in the county: Câmpulung Moldovenesc, Vatra Dornei, Gura Humorului, and Vama.

== Population ==
According to the 1930 census data, the county population was 94,816, ethnically divided among Romanians (61.3%), Germans (20.2%), Jews (8.2%), Ukrainians (6.7%), Poles (1.8%), as well as other minorities. From the religious point of view, the population consisted of Eastern Orthodox (68.2%), Roman Catholics (16.9%), Jewish (8.2%), Lutheran (5.5%), as well as other minorities.

=== Urban population ===
The four urban localities of the county as of the 1930 census were: Câmpulung Moldovenesc (population 10,071), Vatra Dornei (9,826), Gura Humorului (6,042), and Vama (5,315).

In 1930, the county's urban population was 31,254, ethnically divided among Romanians (56.3%), Germans (22.6%), Jews (17.9%), Poles (1.5%), as well as other minorities. From the religious point of view, the urban population consisted of 55.6% Eastern Orthodox, 19.4% Roman Catholic, 17.9% Jewish, 5.2% Lutheran, 1.6% Greek Catholic, as well as other minorities.
