= Liviu Giosan =

Romanian marine geologist

- Born: 1968 (age 57–58); Vama, Suceava, Romania
- Education: University of Bucharest, State University of New York at Stony Brook
- Scientific career
- Fields: Geosciences
- Workplaces: University of Bucharest; Woods Hole Oceanographic Institution

Liviu Giosan (born 1968) is a Romanian marine geologist who studies the interactions between climate, landscapes and humans. In 2000, he co-launched "Ad Astra", an association of scientists from Romania and Romanian diaspora, and has been actively involved in efforts to reform Romania's post-communist science and academia.

== Career ==
Studying the sediment transfer system through rivers into and inside the ocean, he focuses especially on river deltas and has worked in the Danube, Indus, Ebro, Irrawaddy River, Mackenzie among other regions. His work includes contributions reported on by National Geographic on the so-called "Noah's Flood" or the Black Sea deluge hypothesis, New York Times, on the collapse of the ancient urban Indus Valley Civilisation and the long term impact of deforestation on the Danube Delta and the Black Sea, BBC on the drowning of river deltas under human-induced climate changes.

Giosan started his career studying the Danube Delta. This work led to a classification of deltas highlighting the constructive role of waves and to the discovery of an asymmetric (polygenetic) end-member. These advances, together with novel ideas on river mouth morphodynamics, inspired approaches to numerically model river delta evolution and architecture. After producing the first accurate evolution model of the Danube Delta, Giosan explored the dramatic effects of early deforestation on the Danube and Black Sea as a type example of how humans have unintentionally affected the coastal ocean for millennia. Together with colleagues spanning disciplines from paleogenetics to engineering, he linked the rapid growth of the Danube delta in the last 2000 years to deforestation that started under the Roman Empire and accelerated during the Ottoman Empire's expansion in Europe. Ancient DNA preserved in sediments indicated the ecosystem of the whole Black Sea has changed following the deforestation as Danube brought in more nutrients and silica from eroding soils. The magnitude of these changes for a continental-size system such as the Danube-Black Sea is a prime argument for an early Anthropocene epoch.

In 2003, after discovering of a large submarine extension of the Indus Delta, Giosan and his colleagues started to explore the Holocene history of the Indus River and its ancient urban Indus Valley Civilisation. Their analyses of landscape and human settlement dynamics along the Indus and its tributaries offered ample field-based support for a climatic theory of the Indus Civilization collapse. Landscape semi-fossilization as the Indian monsoon declined and aridity increased demonstrates that floods became erratic and less extensive making inundation agriculture less sustainable. Their studies also showed that the Ghaggar-Hakra, a former Indus tributary or a river flowing between the Indus and the Ganges watersheds and the most likely candidate for Sarasvati River of mythical fame, retracted its reach toward the foothills of the Himalaya. That region continued to be populated by the Indus people long after the collapse of their cities. Further work by Giosan's team in peninsular India highlighted the regional character of the impact of such climate changes: while the Indus civilization collapsed under the monsoon decline, people of the peninsula expanded agriculture to cope with aridity. In interviews, Giosan compared the ancient Indus collapse to the present dependence on fossil fuels and introduced the term "Goldilocks civilization" to underline their non-sustainable character.

In 2014, together with other leading deltaic researchers, he examined the global health of deltas showing that these vast coastal lowlands cannot withstand the predicted rise in sea level for the next century and calling for maintenance and reconstruction measures. Using again Danube Delta as an example, Giosan and his colleagues showed that the expansion of a shallow channel network used for fishing in the mid 20th century had beneficial effects by trapping sediments on the delta plain and counteracting sea level rise effects. This channelization of the delta plain, which mimics natural deltas in their youth, emerged as one of the methods for delta reconstruction.

Studying the Tigris–Euphrates river system, Giosan, together with archaeologist Reed Goodman, proposed a new theory on the rise of first literate civilization in Sumer between 6,000 and 5,000 years ago They reframed Sumer's origins, showing how shifting coastlines and tidal forces, combined with river systems, provided the foundation for the world's first cities before developing massive irrigation systems. The new theory provides new perspectives on the fundamental myths of Garden of Eden and The Deluge, which originate in Mesopotamia. Based on the utility of semi-diurnal tides to irrigation and the use of a 30-day month length, Giosan offered a novel explanation on the obscure origin of the sexagesimal systems developed in Sumer and used until today for measurement of time, angle and geographical coordinates.

== Public life ==
In 2000, Giosan initiated and co-founded "Ad Astra", an association of academics dedicated to the reform of science and education in post-communist Romania. Occasionally he publishes analyses and OpEd texts in the Romanian media such as România Curată, Adevărul, or România Liberă.
