= Sámuel Literáti Nemes =

Hungarian antiquarian and forger (1796–1842)

Sámuel Literáti Nemes (1796–1842), Transylvanian-Hungarian antiquarian, infamous for many forgeries which even deceived some of the most renowned Hungarian scholars of the time.

Some Hungarian scholars suspect him to be involved in the forgery of Codex Rohonczi. This opinion goes back as far as 1866, to Károly Szabó (1824-1890), Hungarian historian.
