= Daniel Popescu (politician) =

Romanian politician (b. 1981)

Member of Parliament
- In office 19 April 2017 – present

Personal details
- Born: Nicolae Daniel Popescu; 31 May 1981 (age 45)
- Party: Save Romania Union (USR)
- Education: Petre Andrei University of Iași; Alexandru Ioan Cuza University
- Profession: Researcher, manager

Nicolae-Daniel Popescu (born May 31, 1981, Câmpulung Moldovenesc, Suceava County, Bukovina, Romania) is a Romanian politician currently serving as a Member of Parliament in the Chamber of Deputies. He is a vice-chair of the Committee for Romanian Communities Living Abroad, and a member of the Committee for Defence, Public Order, and National Security. Popescu is also a vice-leader of the Save Romania Union (USR) parliamentary group in the Chamber of Deputies.

== Education and career ==
Popescu graduated in 2004 with a bachelor's degree in law from the Petre Andrei University in Iași. He also completed a postgraduate programme in politics and European integration at the Alexandru Ioan Cuza University in Iași (2007) and a postgraduate programme in security and good government from the Carol I National Defence University in Bucharest (2018).

Popescu has over 10 years of professional experience in education and research. He is a former researcher and manager of the research department at the National Recognition and Information Centre for the United Kingdom (UK NARIC) and an active member of the Romanian community in the UK. In 2012 he launched the Network of Romanian Professionals Abroad, and in 2015 the Romanian Gloucestershire weekend School in Cheltenham, attended by children of Romanian origin from Gloucestershire.

His work for the Romanian community was recognised in 2013 by the Romanian Embassy in the UK, which awarded him with an "Ambassador Diploma" in the category "Work for the Romanian Community" for the positive role he played in the process of integrating Romanian professionals into the British society, and for improving the recognition of Romanian qualifications in the UK.
