= Rarău Massif =

Mountain in Romania

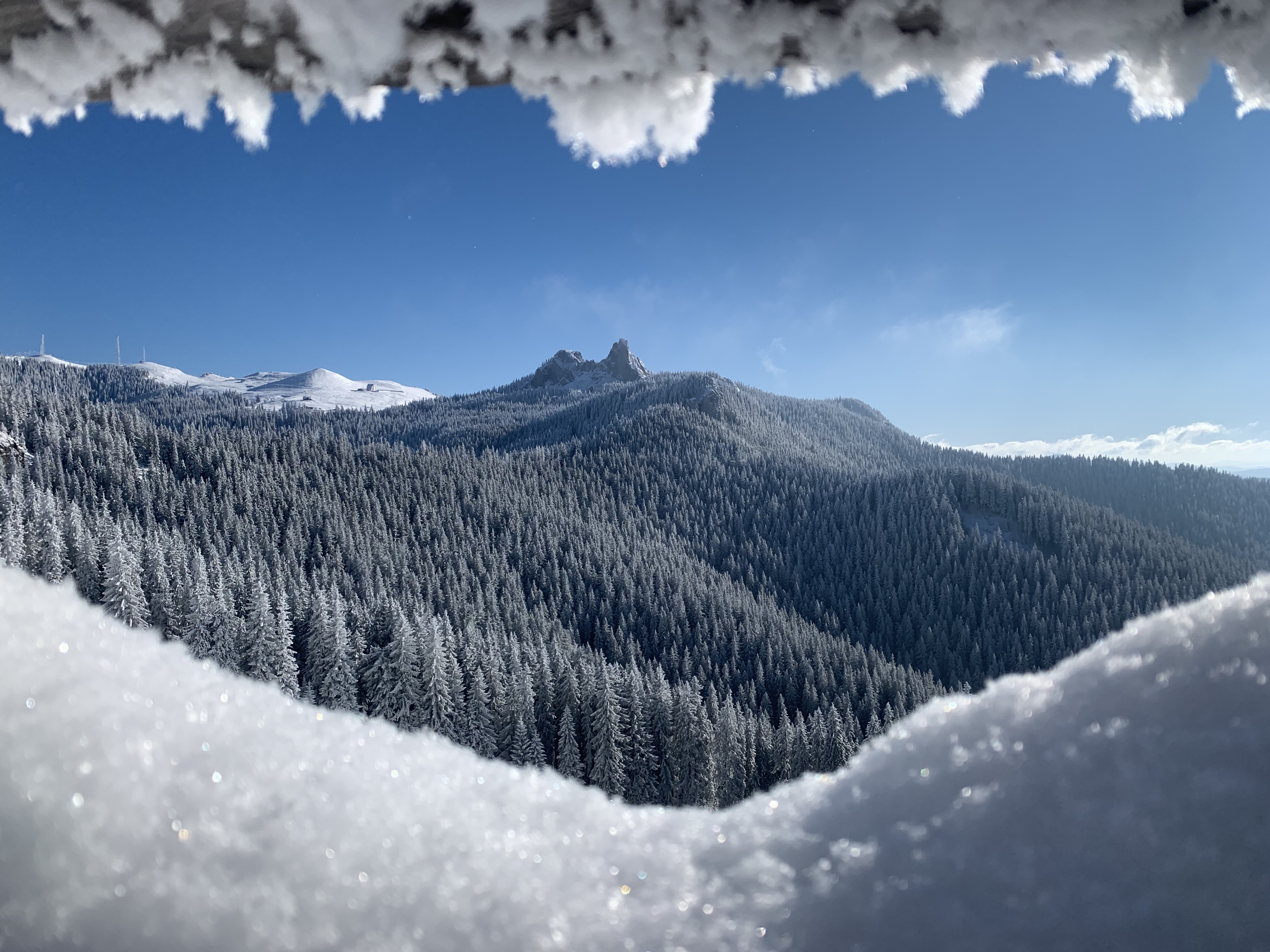
- Pietrele Doamnei and Piatra Șoimului rocks

Highest point
- Elevation: 1,651 metres (5,417 ft)
- Coordinates: 47°27′08″N 25°34′26″E

Dimensions
- Area: 160 km^{2} (62 mi^{2})

Naming
- Native name: Masivul Rarău (Romanian)

Geography
- Location within Romania
- Parent range: Eastern Romanian Carpathians

The Rarău Massif is a subgroup of the Moldo-Transylvanian Carpathians, located in the Eastern Romanian Carpathians. The highest peak is Rarău, with an altitude of 1,651 metres (5,417 ft), and the lowest altitude is 600 metres (2,000 ft), in the Moldova River valley.

== Location and geography ==
The Rarău Massif is located in northern Romania (Suceava County), in the historical region of Bukovina, between the valleys of the Moldova and Bistrița rivers. The closest population centers are the towns of Câmpulung Moldovenesc and Vatra Dornei and the commune of Pojorâta. The total surface of the Rarău Massif is ca. 160 square kilometers.

The peak is easily accessible on foot on marked trails. By car, the Massif is accessible up to an altitude of 1520 m, via the Transrarău road (DJ175B).

The massif is known for its many picturesque limestone formations. The best known is Pietrele Doamnei, a group of three large limestone pillars located at a height of 1400 m, close to the peak.

== Climate ==
The average temperature in January is −7 °C (19 °F) at the Rarău Meteorological Station, with significant differences are registered between the slopes with northern and southern orientation. The average temperature for July is 11.4 °C (52.5 °F) for the Rarău station, with minimal differences between the slopes with northern and southern exposure.

Precipitations at the Rarău Meteorological Station have a multi-annual average of 909 mm (35.8 in), with an average of 163 days of snow cover per year.
