= Daniel Florentin Popescu =

Romanian footballer

Daniel Popescu
Personal information
- Full name: Daniel Florentin Popescu
- Date of birth: 25 August 1993 (age 33)
- Place of birth: Târgu Jiu, Romania
- Position: Goalkeeper

Youth career
- Pandurii Târgu Jiu

Senior career*
Years	Team	Apps	(Gls)
2012–2018	Pandurii Târgu Jiu	7	(0)
2012–2013	→ Voința Sibiu (loan)'	2	(0)
2013–2014	→ Minerul Motru (loan)	23	(0)
2014–2015	→ Râmnicu Vâlcea (loan)	13	(0)
2015–2016	→ Pandurii II Târgu Jiu	?	(?)
2016–2017	→ Metalurgistul Cugir (loan)	?	(?)
- * Club domestic league appearances and goals as of 3 June 2018

Daniel Florentin Popescu (born 25 August 1993) is a Romanian professional footballer who plays as a goalkeeper.
