= Vama, Suceava =

Vama German: Wama
- Commune
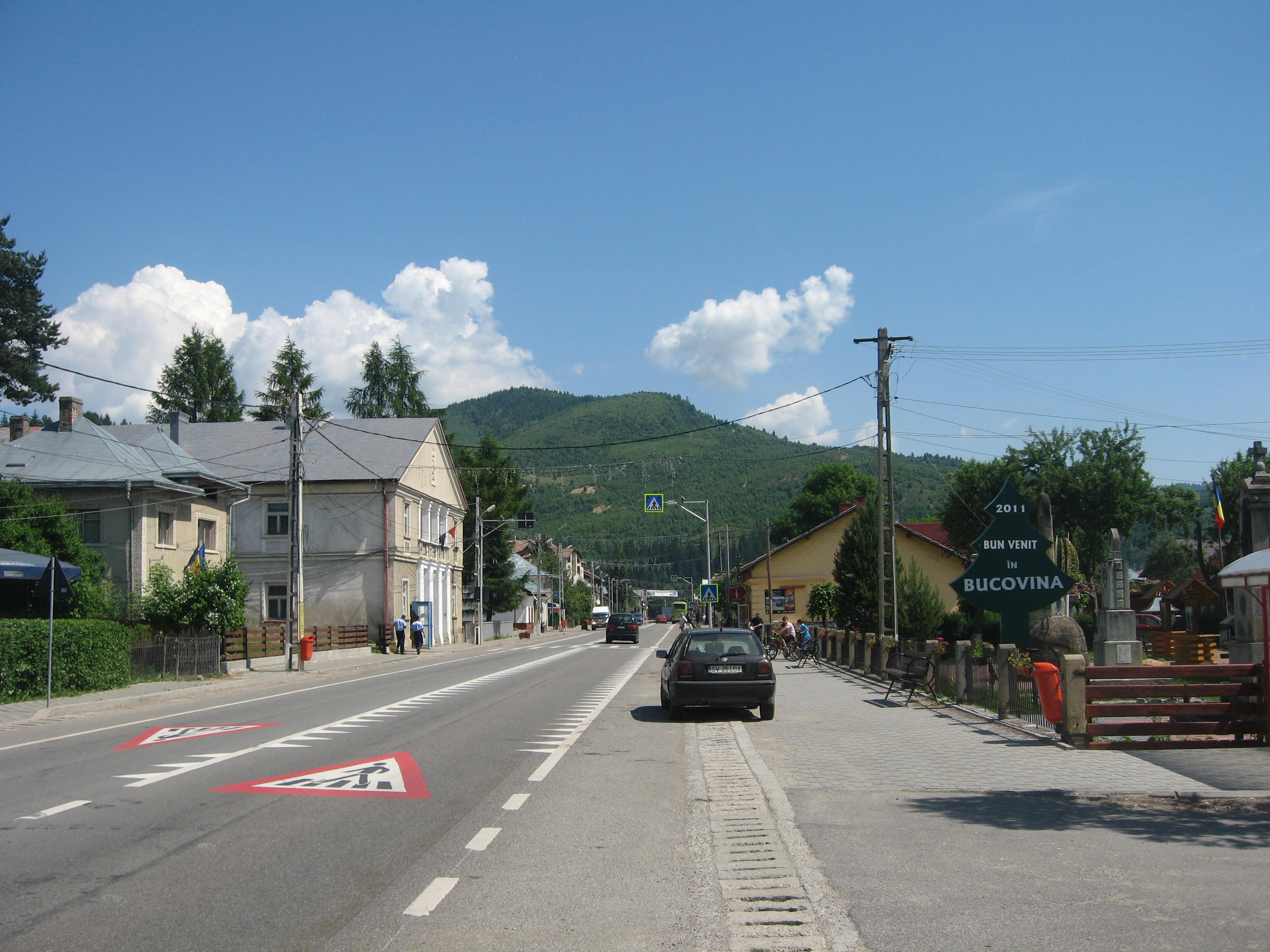
- Vama commune in Suceava County

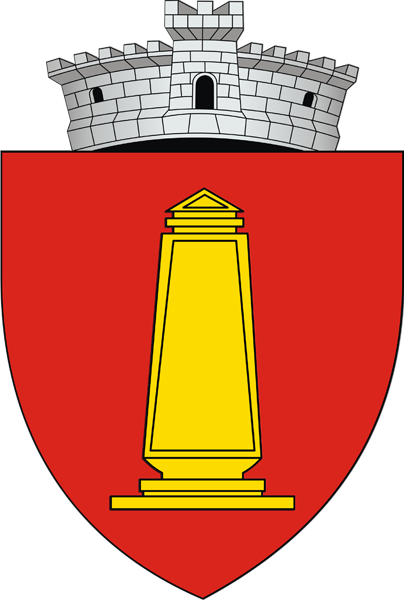
- Coat of arms

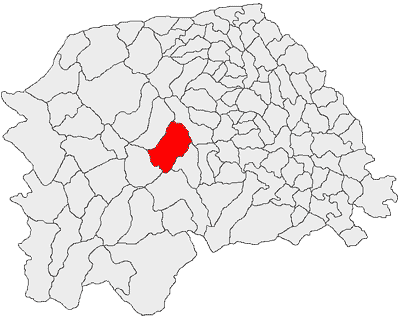
- Location in Suceava County

- Location in Romania
- Coordinates: 47°33′N 25°43′E
- Country: Romania
- County: Suceava
- Subdivisions: Vama, Molid, Prisaca Dornei, Strâmtura

Government
  - Mayor (2024–2028): Constantin-Tiberius Lucuțar (PNL)
- Area: 136 km^{2} (53 sq mi)
- Elevation: 548 m (1,798 ft)
- Population (2021-12-01): 5,413
  - Density: 39.8/km^{2} (103/sq mi)
- Time zone: UTC+02:00 (EET)
  - Summer (DST): UTC+03:00 (EEST)
- Postal code: 727590
- Area code: (+40) x30
- Vehicle reg.: SV
- Website: vamabucovina.ro

Vama (German: Wama) is a commune located in Suceava County, Bukovina, northeastern Romania. It is composed of four villages: namely Molid, Prisaca Dornei (German: Eisenau), Strâmtura, and Vama. The locality was a town until 1950 when it lost its urban status.

== Administration and local politics ==
=== Communal council ===
The commune's current local council has the following political composition, according to the results of the 2020 Romanian local elections:

Party	Seats	Current Council
National Liberal Party (PNL)	5	
Save Romania Union (USR)	4	
PRO Romania (PRO)	2	
Social Democratic Party (PSD)	2	
People's Movement Party (PMP)	1	
Independent politician (Axentioi Severin)	1	

== Gallery ==
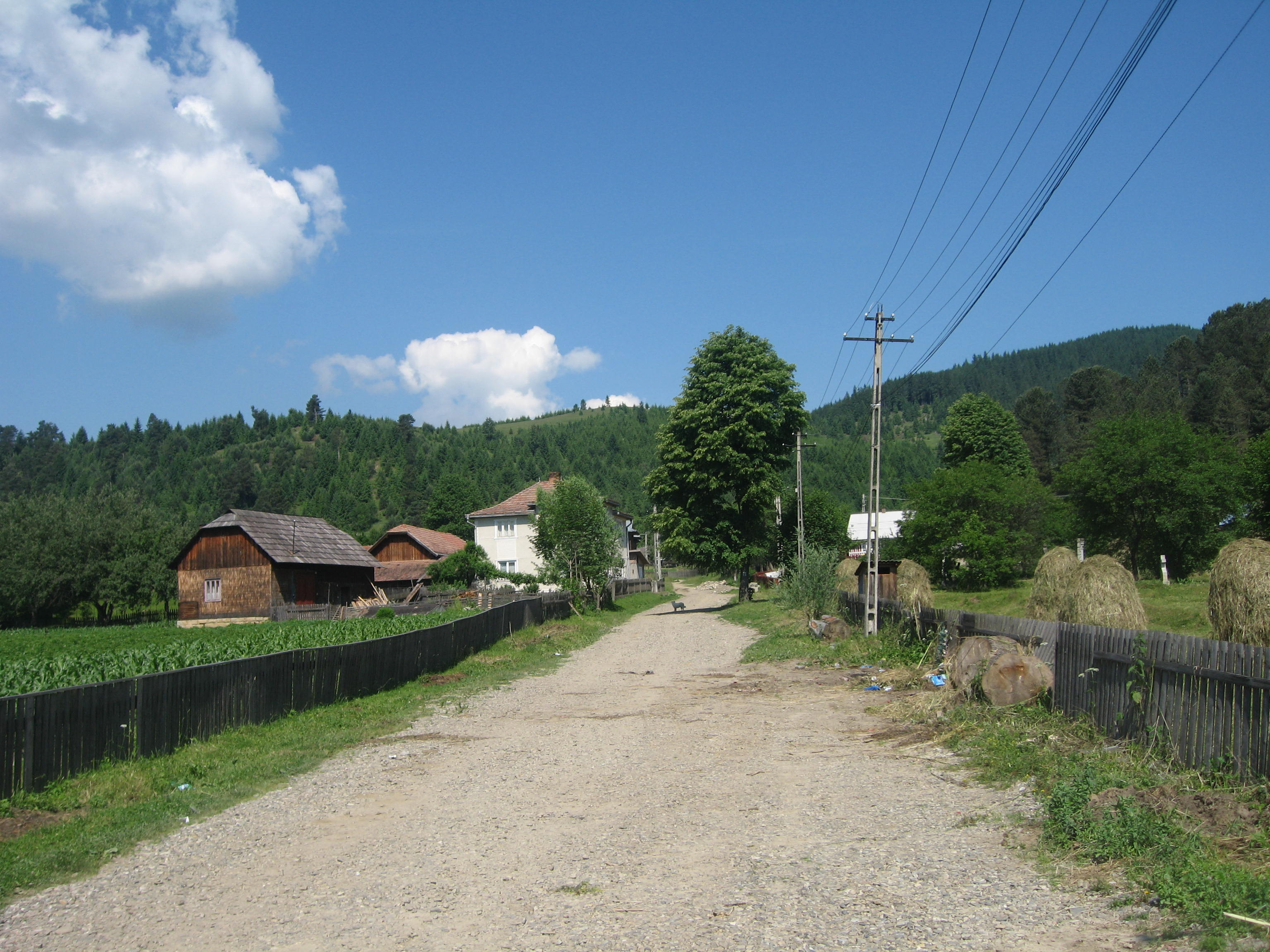
Vama village

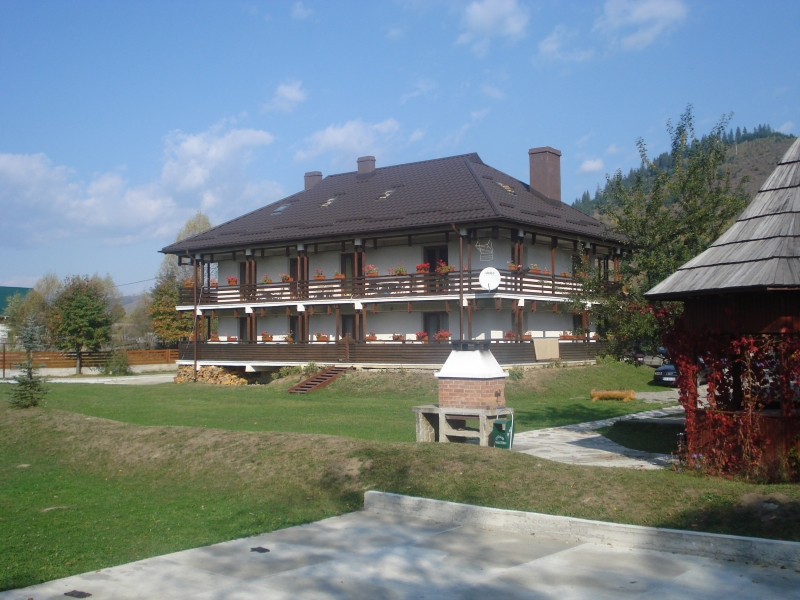
Irina guest house in Vama

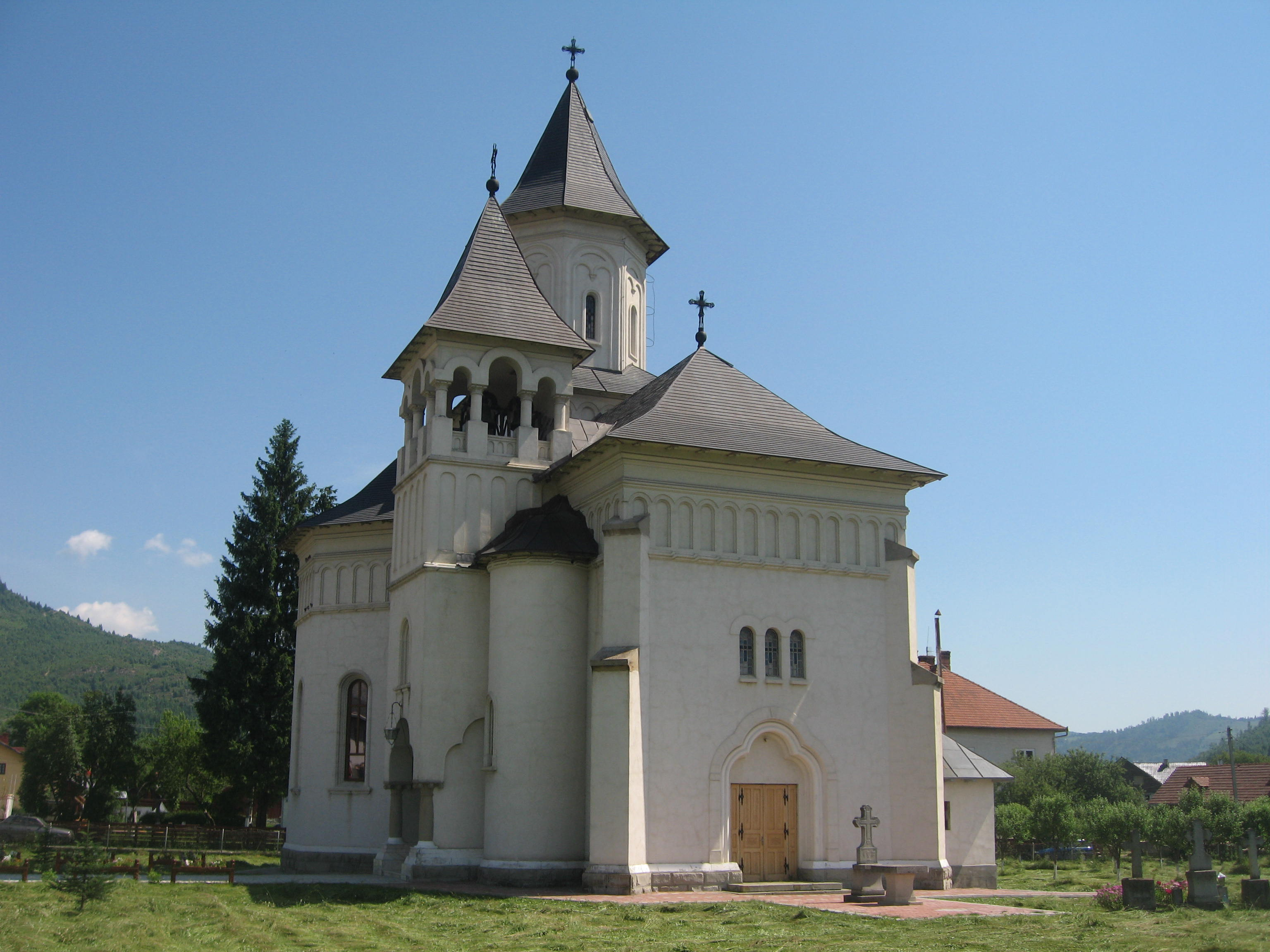
Saint Nicholas Romanian Orthodox church in Vama

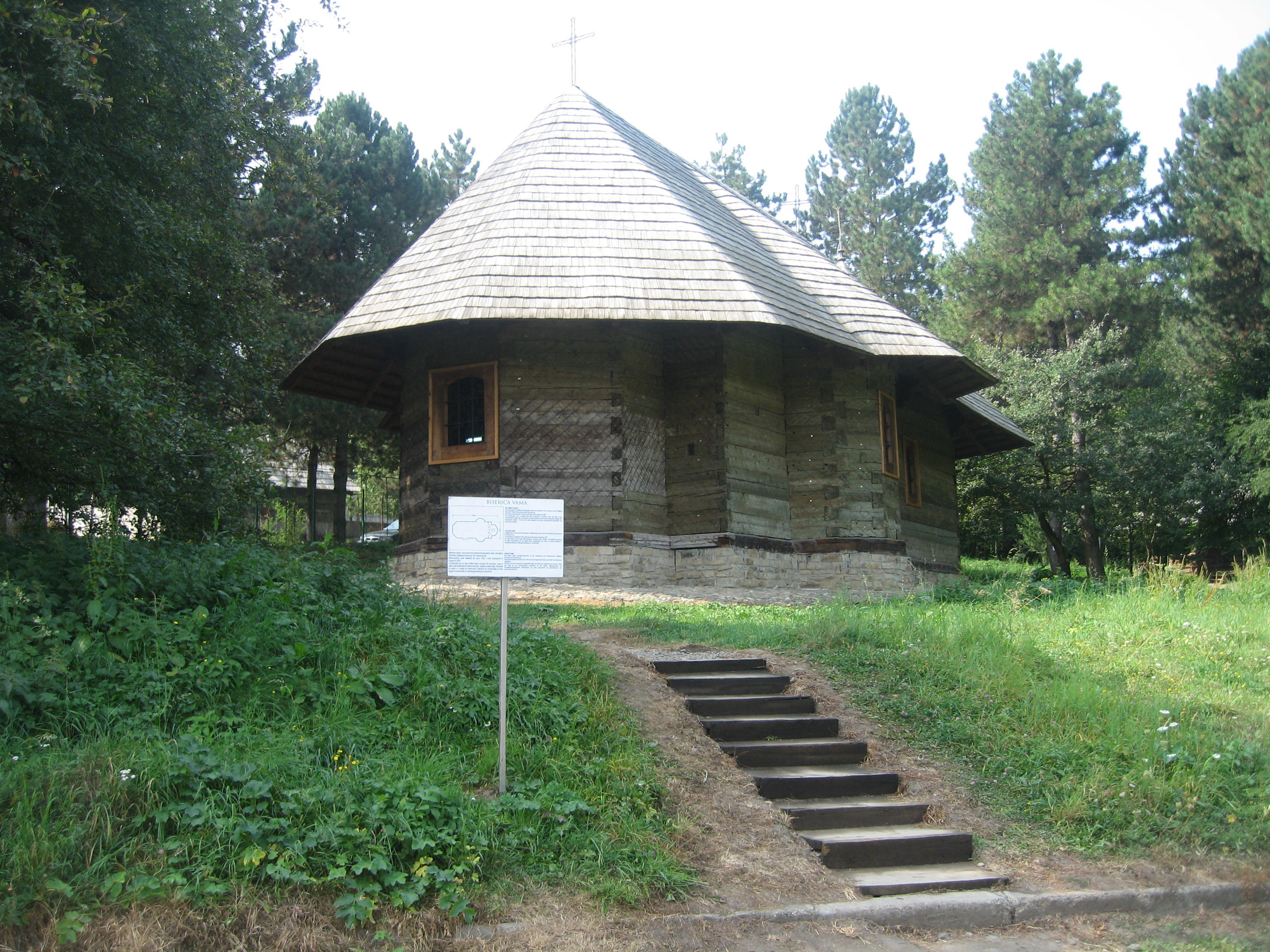
Wooden Orthodox church in Vama

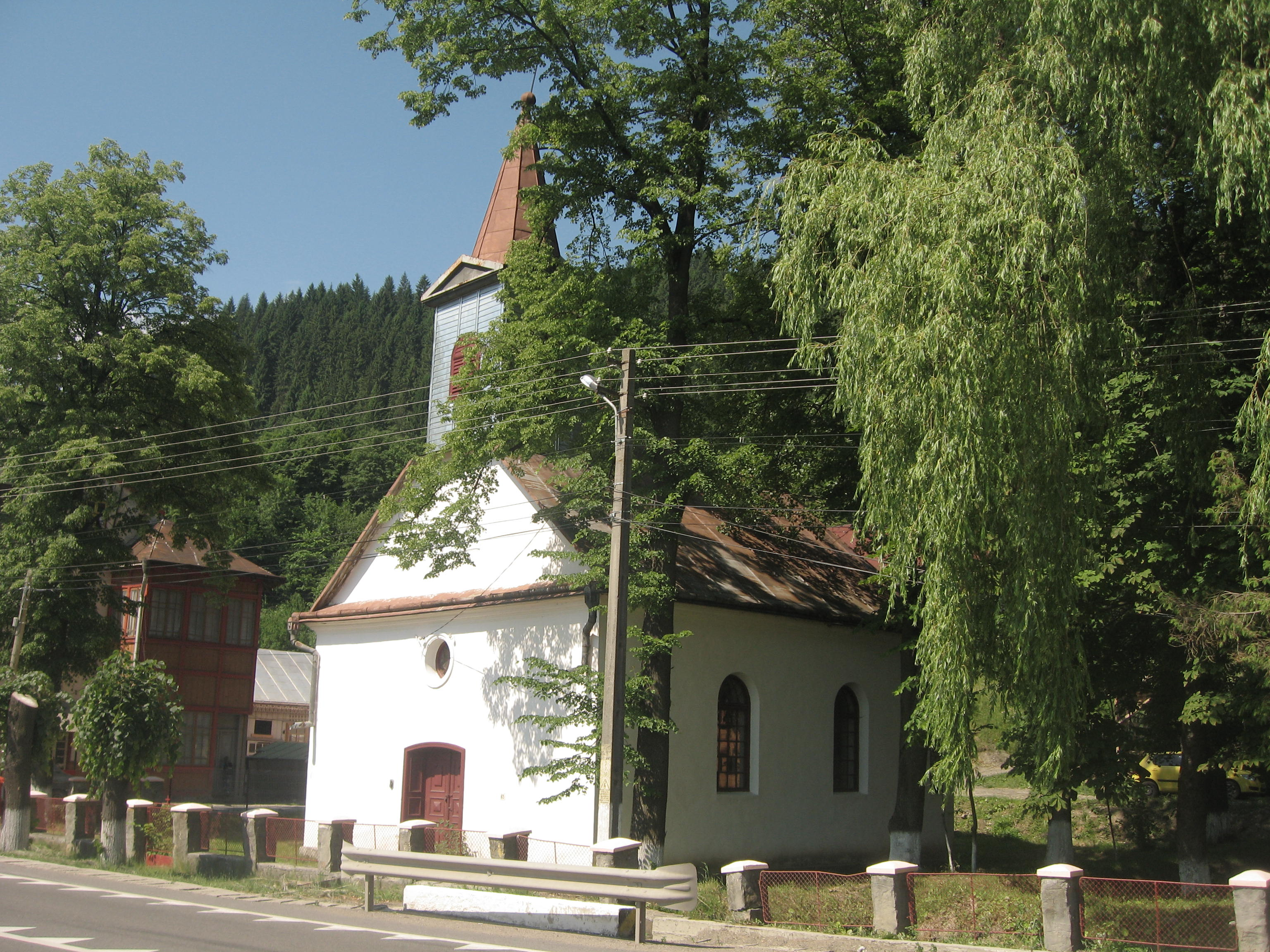
The Roman Catholic church of the bygone Bukovina German community in Prisaca Dornei (German: Eisenau)

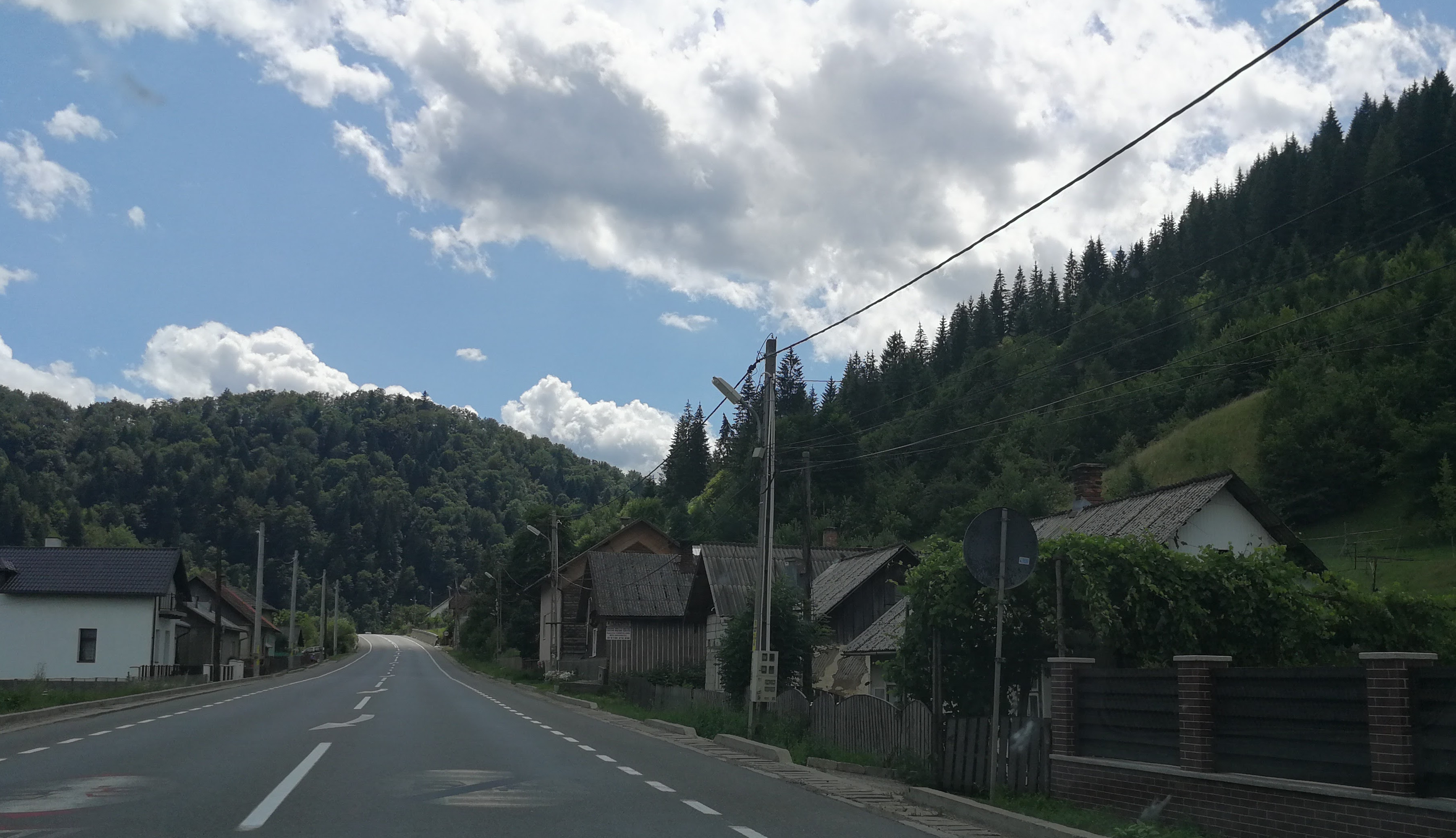
Road in Prisaca Dornei (German: Eisenau)

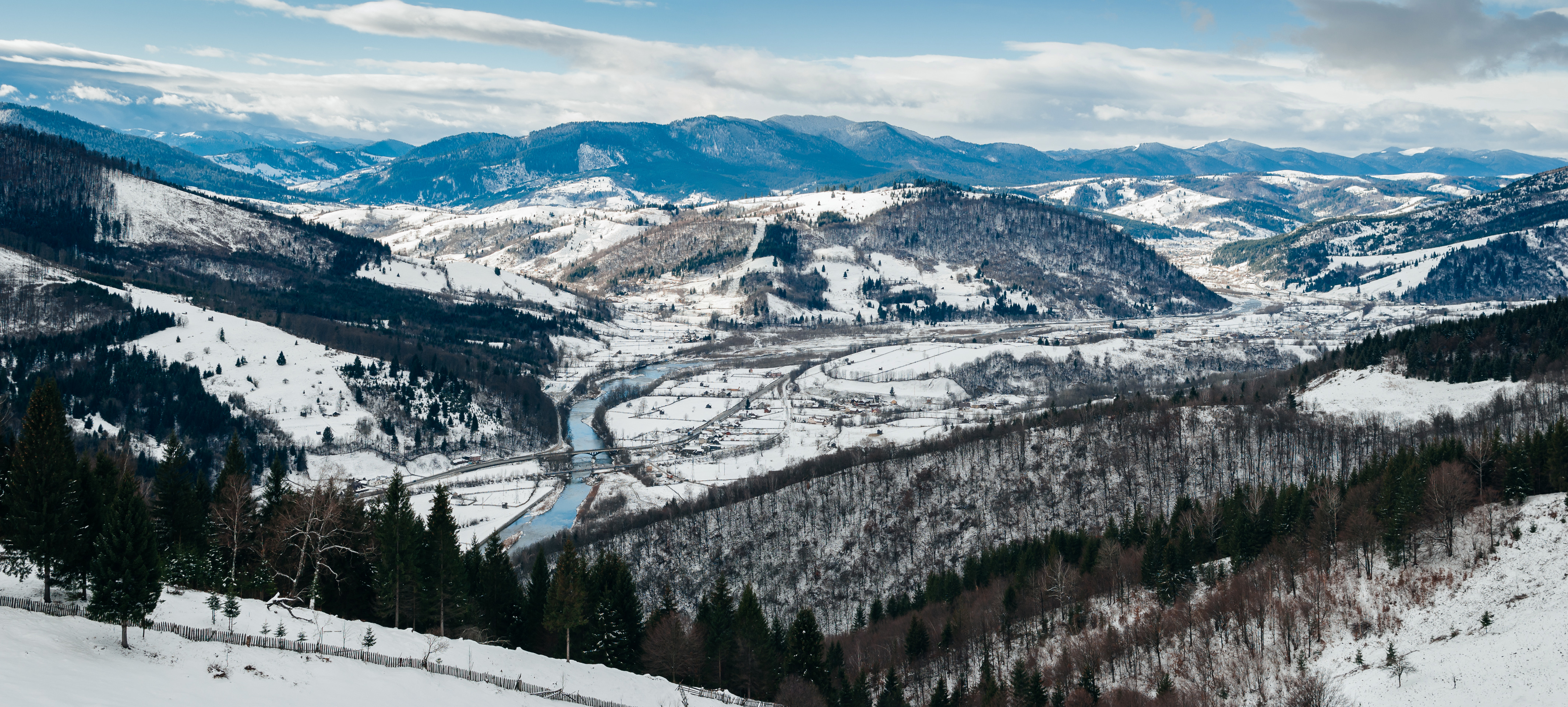
Molid in wintertime

== Notable people ==
- Liviu Giosan (born in Vama)
