= Voievodeasa =

Voievodeasa or Voivodeasa may refer to the following places in Romania:

- Voievodeasa, a village in the commune Sucevița, Suceava County
- Voievodeasa (Sucevița), a tributary of the Sucevița in Suceava County
- Voivodeasa, a tributary of the Toplița in Harghita County
