= Sucevița Monastery =

Monastery located in Sucevita

- Mănăstirea Sucevița
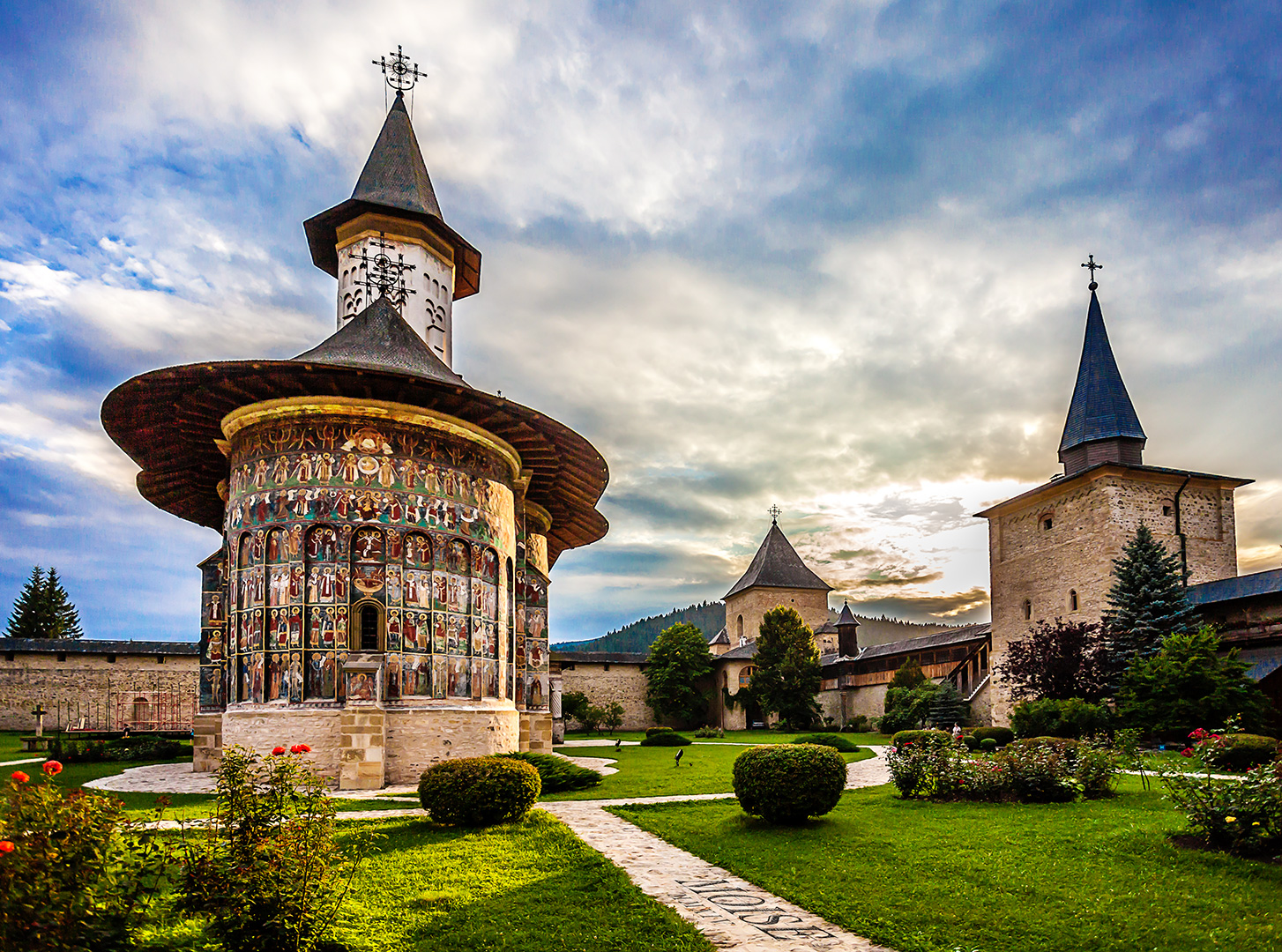
- The church and the courtyard of Sucevița Monastery

Religion
- Affiliation: Eastern Orthodox
- Ecclesiastical or organisational status: Nunnery
- Patron: Resurrection of Jesus
- Status: Active

Location
- Location: Sucevița, Suceava County, Romania
- Interactive map of Sucevița Monastery
- Coordinates: 47°46′41.36″N 25°42′40.42″E

Architecture
- Style: Byzantine, Gothic
- Founder: Gheorghe Movilă
- Groundbreaking: 1581
- Completed: 1601

UNESCO World Heritage Site
- Part of: Churches of Moldavia
- Criteria: Cultural: (i), (iv)
- Reference: 598
- Inscription: 1993 (17th Session)

Sucevița Monastery is an Eastern Orthodox convent situated in the Northeastern part of Romania. It is situated near the Suceviţa River, in the village Sucevița, 18 km away from the city of Rădăuţi, Suceava County. It is located in the southern part of the historical region of Bukovina (northwestern Moldavia). It was built in 1585 by Ieremia Movilă, Gheorghe Movilă and Simion Movilă.

The architecture of the church contains both Byzantine and Gothic elements, and some elements typical to other painted churches of northern Moldavia. Both interior and exterior walls are covered by mural paintings, which are of great artistic value and depict biblical episodes from the Old and New Testament. The paintings date from around 1601, which makes Sucevița one of the last monasteries to be decorated in the famous Moldavian style of exterior paintings.

The interior court of the monastic ensemble is almost square (100 by 104 meters) and is surrounded by high (6 m), wide (3 m) walls. There are several other defensive structures within the ensemble, including four towers (one on each corner). Sucevița was a princely residence as well as a fortified monastery. The thick walls today shelter a museum that presents an outstanding collection of historical and art objects. The tomb covers of Ieremia and Simion Movilă – rich portraits embroidered in silver thread – together with ecclesiastical silverware, books and illuminated manuscripts, offer eloquent testimony to Sucevița's importance first as a manuscript workshop, then as a printing center.

In 2010, the monastery has been inscribed by UNESCO on its list of World Heritage Sites, as one of the Painted churches of Moldavia. It is also the second major attraction along the Via Transilvanica long-distance trail, after Putna Monastery.

== Burials ==
- Ieremia Movilă

== Gallery ==
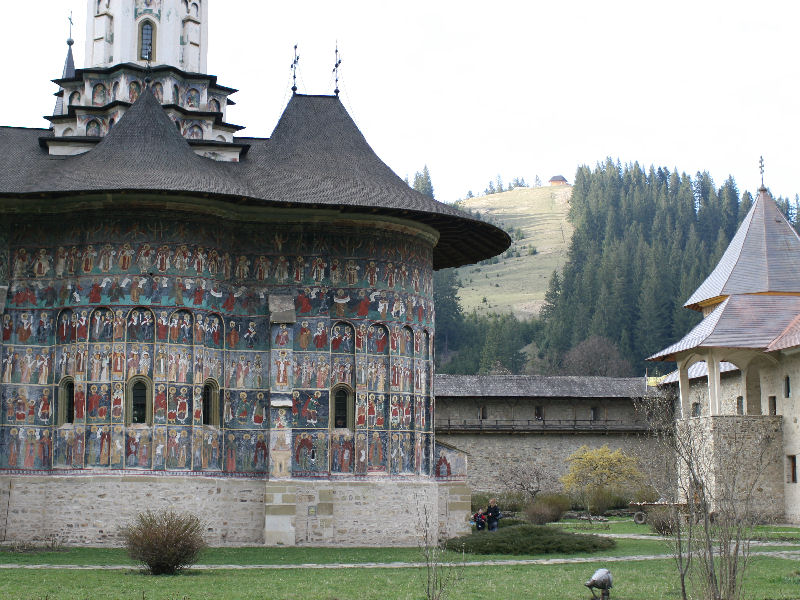
View of the ensemble, with the walls in the background

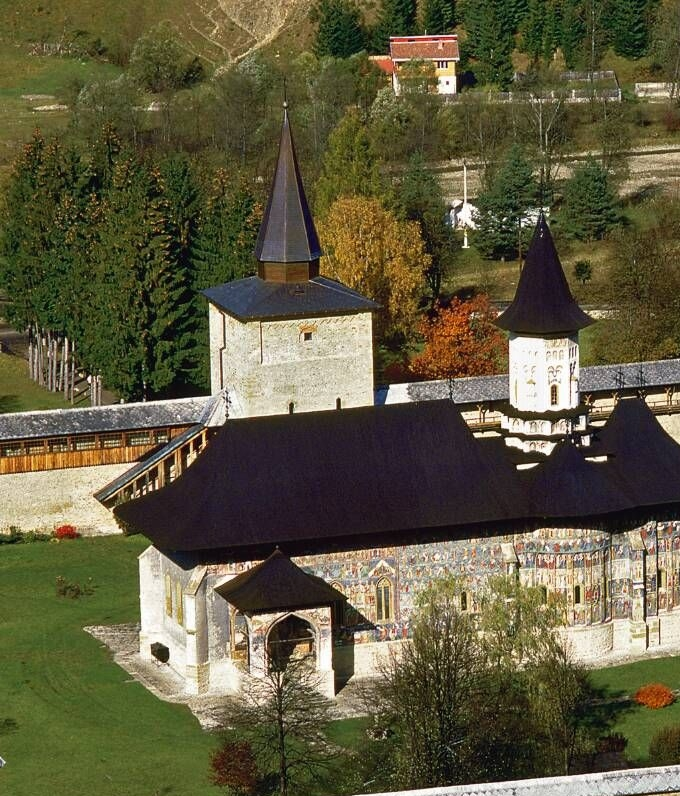
Different angle

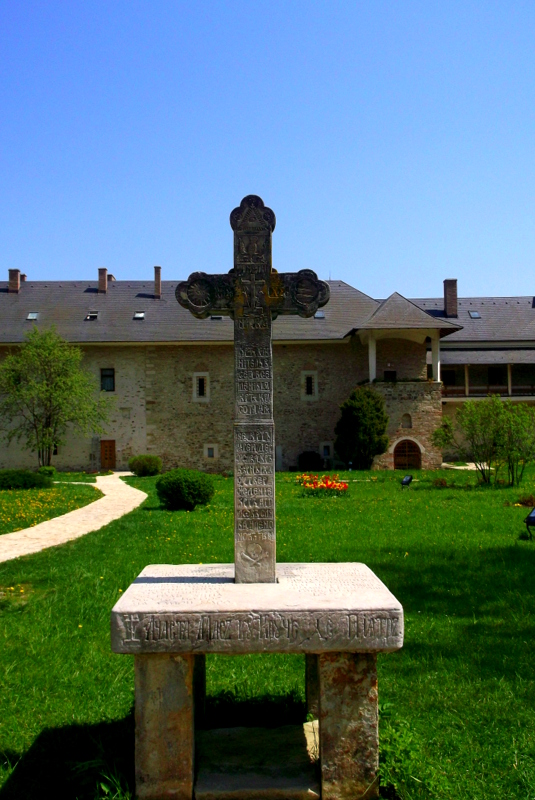
Cross the courtyard of the monastery

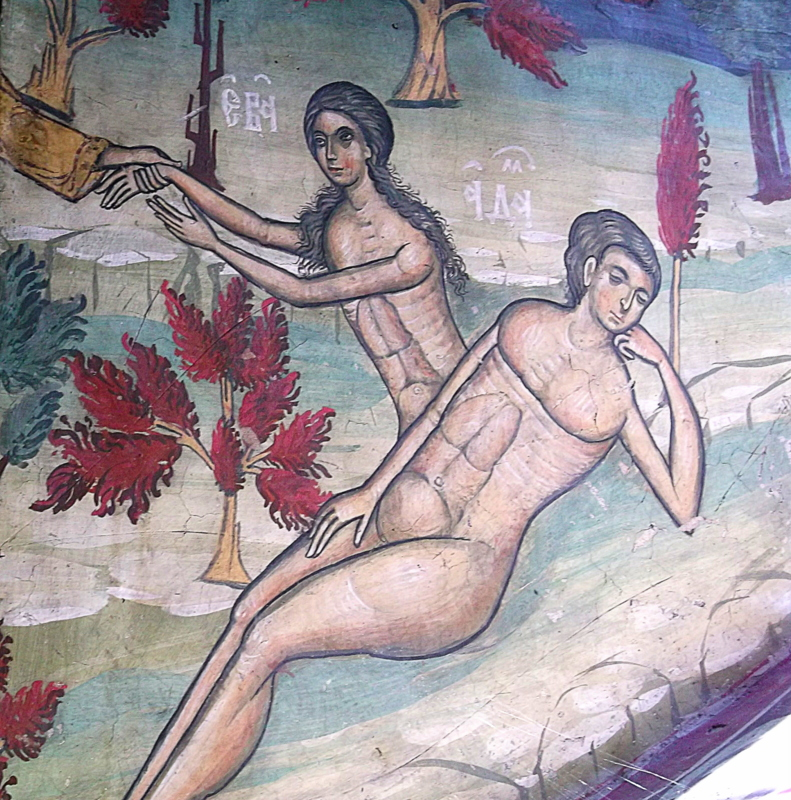
The fresco in the monastery

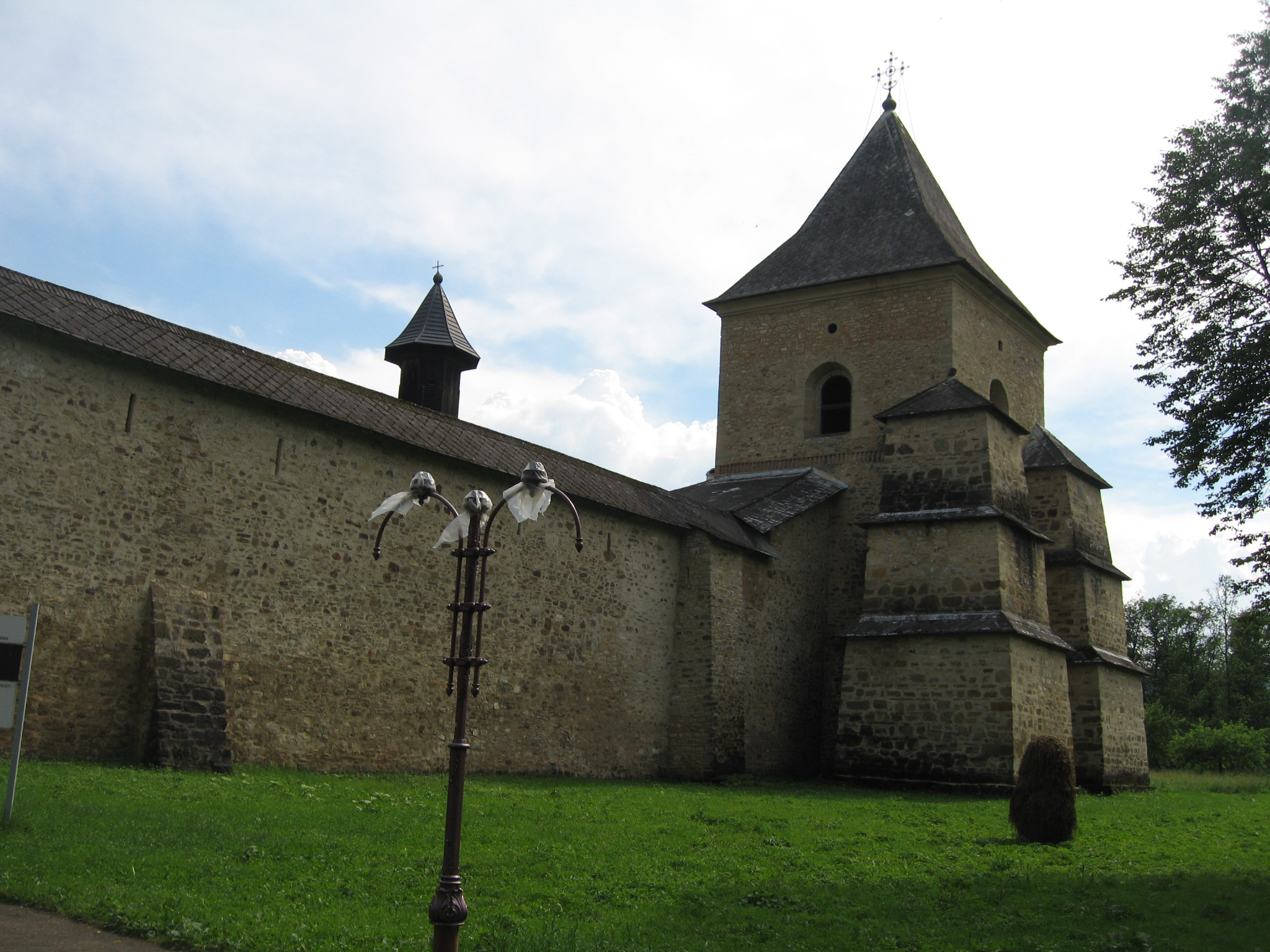
One of the four towers

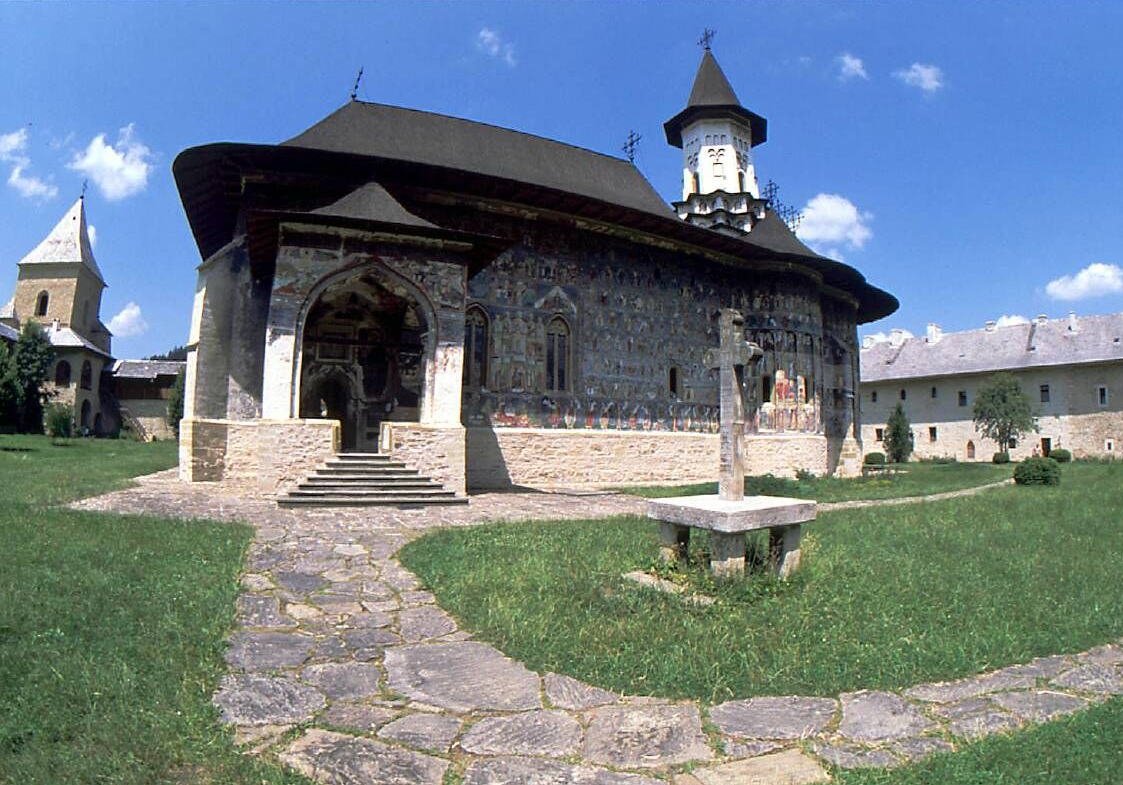
Entrance

== See also ==
- Alexander the Good
- Churches of Moldavia
