= Józef Weber =

Roman Catholic prelate (1846–1918)

Servant of God, Archbishop Józef Weber, C.R.
- Titular Archbishop of Darnis, Auxiliary Bishop of Roman Catholic Archdiocese of Lviv
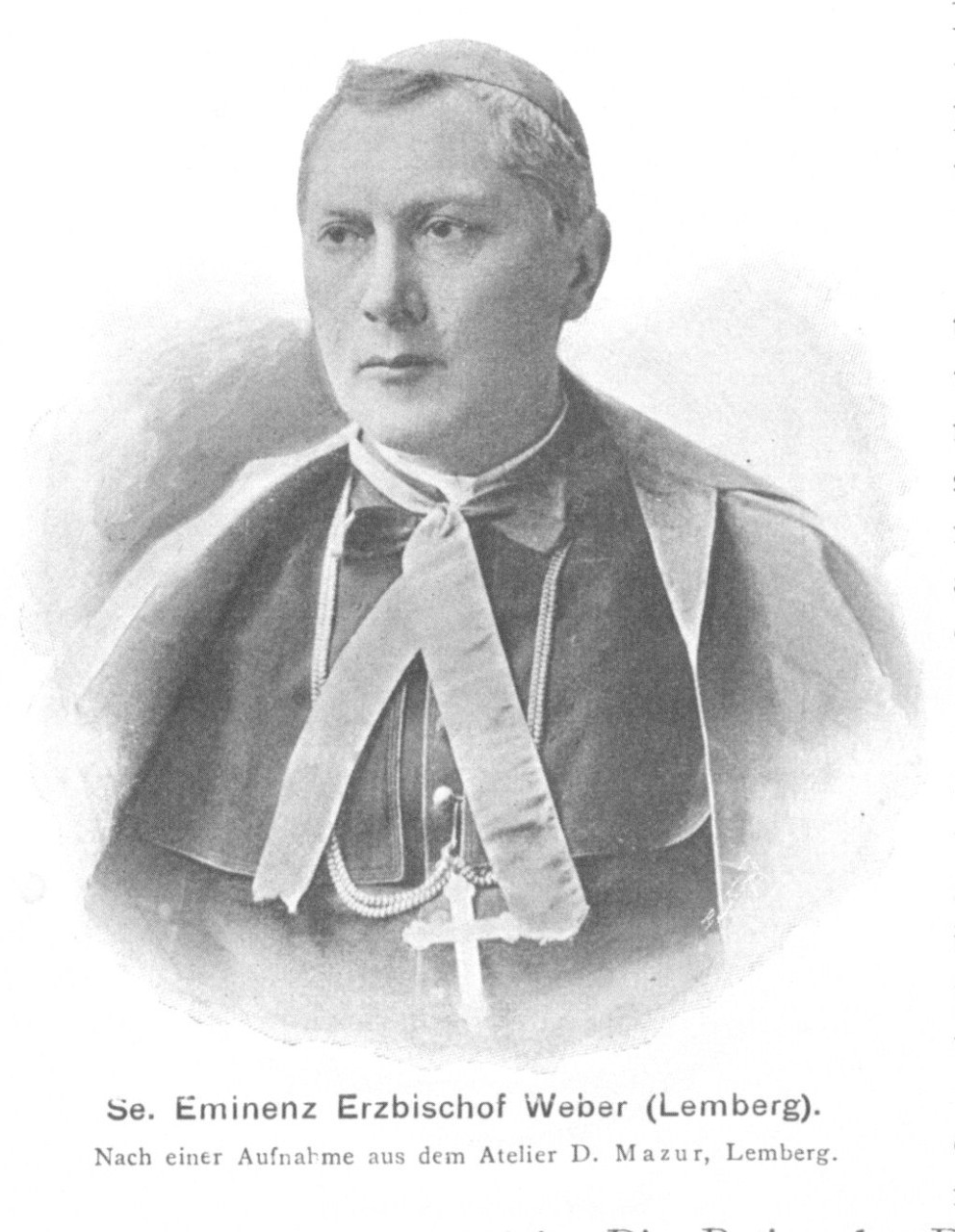
- Church: Roman Catholic Church
- Appointed: 2 December 1895
- Term ended: 26 May 1906
- Other posts: Auxiliary Archbishop of Lviv (1895–1906), Titular Bishop of Temnos (1895–1901) and Titular Archbishop of Darnis (1901–1918)

Orders
- Ordination: 7 June 1873 (Priest)
- Consecration: 29 December 1895 (Bishop) by Seweryn Morawski

Personal details
- Born: Joseph Weber; 12 June 1846 Fürstenthal, Austrian Empire (present day Voievodeasa in Suceava County, Romania)
- Died: 24 March 1918 (aged 71) Chicago, Illinois, United States

Archbishop Józef Weber, C.R. (Ukrainian: Юзеф Вебер; German: Joseph Weber; 12 June 1846 – 24 March 1918) was a Roman Catholic prelate, who served as an Auxiliary Bishop of the Roman Catholic Archdiocese of Lviv from 2 December 1895 until his resignation on 26 May 1906 and hold the titles of a Titular Bishop of Temnos from 2 December 1895 until 15 April 1901 and a Titular Archbishop of Darnis from 15 April 1901 until his death on 24 March 1918.

== Life ==
Archbishop Weber was born in a German Bohemian family of the colonists in Bukovina. After graduation from the school and gymnasium education, he subsequently joined the Faculty of Theology at the University of Lviv and the Major Roman Catholic Theological Seminary in Lviv. After that he continued to study in the Polish College in Rome, where he was ordained as priest on June 7, 1873, for the Roman Catholic Archdiocese of Lviv, while completed of the philosophical and theological studies. In time of his studies he wished to join the Resurrectionists, inspired by the Rector of Polish College Fr. Piotr Semenenko, C.R., but his Archbishop asked him to postpone his decision.

After returning from Italy, he served as a chancellor of the Metropolitan curia and a spiritual director in a Major Roman Catholic Theological Seminary in Lviv. At the same time, from 1881, he became a director and curator of the Resurrectionist Congregation for 25 years.

On December 2, 1895, he was appointed by the Pope Leo XIII as an Auxiliary Bishop of the Roman Catholic Archdiocese of Lviv and a Titular Bishop of Temnos. On December 29, 1895, he was consecrated as bishop by Metropolitan Archbishop Seweryn Morawski and other prelates of the Roman Catholic and Armenian Catholic Churches in the Cathedral Basilica of the Assumption, Lviv. In the same time he was nominated as an Episcopal Vicar for Bukovina (1895–1906), that was a part of the Archdiocese of Lviv.

On April 15, 1901, he was elevated in the rank of Archbishop with title of Darnis, remained an auxiliary bishop.

On May 26, 1906, Archbishop Weber resigned as an auxiliary bishop and joined the Resurrectionist Congregation, were made a profession on June 24, 1906. Rest his life he lived in Rome and later, from 1909, in the United States. He served as a Superior of the American-Canadian province of the Resurrectionists from 1911 until his death in 1918.

Catholic Church titles
Preceded by Antonio del Buffalo	Titular Bishop of Temnos; 1895–1901	Succeeded by Louis-Auguste Dartois
Preceded by José Pereira da Silva Barros	Titular Archbishop of Darnis; 1901–1918	Succeeded by Gisleno Veneri
