= Volovăț (Sucevița) =

- Location within Romania

Location
- Country: Romania
- Counties: Suceava County
- Villages: Volovăț

Physical characteristics
- Mouth: Sucevița
  - location: Rădăuți
  - coordinates: 47.8183°N 25.9334°E
- Length: 13 km (8.1 mi)
- Basin size: 27 km^{2} (10 sq mi)

Basin features
- Progression: Sucevița→ Suceava→ Siret→ Danube→ Black Sea

The Volovăț is a right tributary of the river Sucevița in Romania. It flows into the Sucevița near Rădăuți. Its length is 13 km (8.1 mi) and its basin size is 27 km^{2} (10 sq mi).
