= Sucevița (river) =

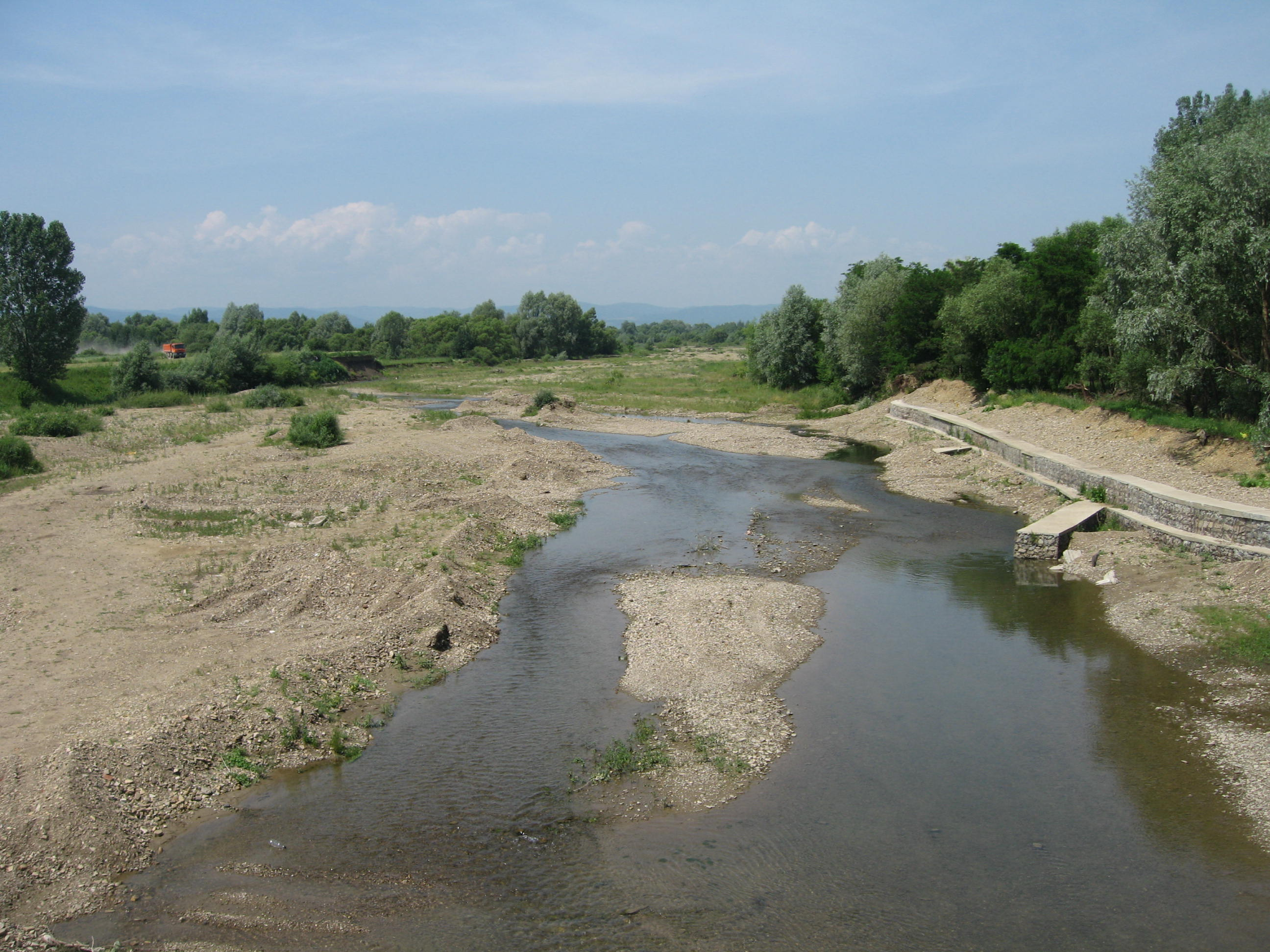

- Location within Romania

Location
- Country: Romania
- Counties: Suceava County
- Villages: Sucevița, Voievodeasa, Marginea, Rădăuți

Physical characteristics
- Mouth: Suceava
  - location: Milișăuți
  - coordinates: 47.8015°N 26.0105°E
- Length: 41 km (25 mi)
- Basin size: 199 km^{2} (77 sq mi)

Basin features
- Progression: Suceava→ Siret→ Danube→ Black Sea
- Tributaries
  - left: Rusca, Bercheza, Voievodeasa, Toplița
  - right: Volovăț

The Sucevița is a right tributary of the river Suceava in Romania. It discharges into the Suceava in Milișăuți. Its length is 41 km (25 mi) and its basin size is 199 km^{2} (77 sq mi).
