= Emil Bodnăraș =

Romanian communist politician, army officer and Soviet agent (1904–1976)

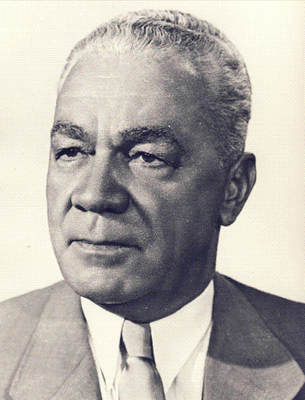
- Bodnăraș in 1959

Vice President of the State Council
- In office 9 December 1967 – 24 January 1976
- President: Nicolae Ceaușescu
- Preceded by: Ion Gheorghe Maurer
- Succeeded by: Maria Ciocan

First Vice President of the Council of Ministers
- In office 4 October 1955 – 8 December 1967
- Prime Minister: Chivu Stoica; Ion Gheorghe Maurer
- Preceded by: Chivu Stoica
- Succeeded by: Ilie Verdeț

Minister of War
- In office 27 December 1947 – 3 October 1955
- Prime Minister: Petru Groza; Gheorghe Gheorghiu-Dej
- Preceded by: Mihail Lascăr
- Succeeded by: Leontin Sălăjan

Personal details
- Born: February 10, 1904 Kolomyia/Iaslovăț/Câmpulung Moldovenesc, Austria-Hungary
- Died: January 24, 1976 (aged 71) Bucharest, Socialist Republic of Romania
- Resting place: Iaslovăț, Romania
- Party: Romanian Communist Party
- Other political affiliations: National Romanian Fascio (1920s); National Christian Defense League (1924–1925)
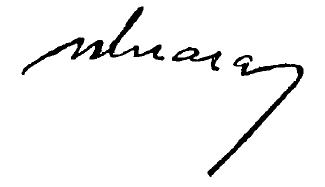
- Signature

Military service
- Allegiance: Kingdom of Romania; Soviet Union; Socialist Republic of Romania
- Branch/service: Royal Romanian Army; Soviet Army; Romanian Land Forces
- Years of service: 1930–1931, 1947–1976 (Romania); 1931–1935 (USSR)
- Rank: General
- Battles/wars: World War II; Hungarian Revolution

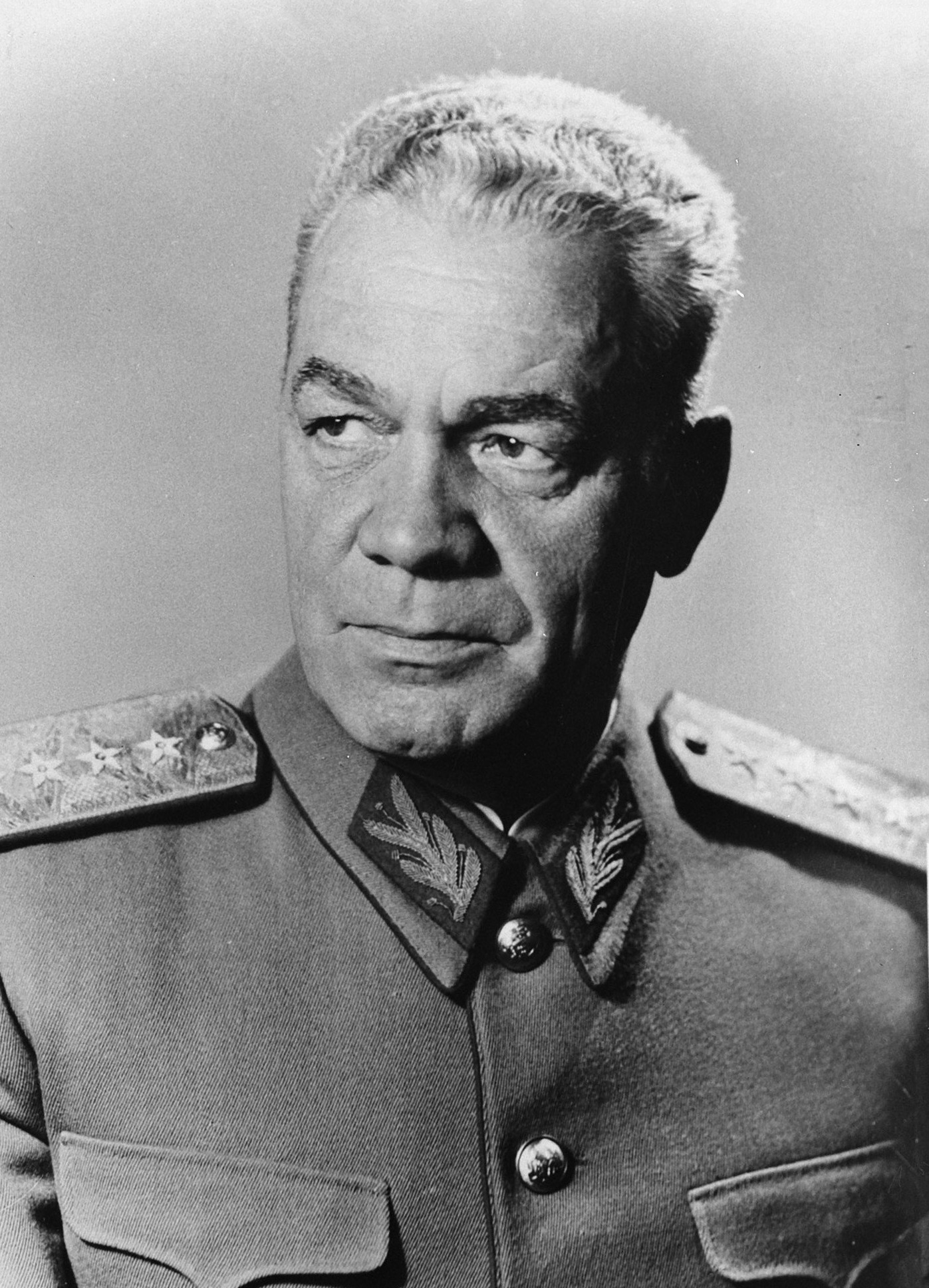
Bodnăraș in a general's uniform

Emil Bodnăraș (10 February 1904 – 24 January 1976) was a Romanian communist politician, an army officer, and a Soviet agent, who had considerable influence in the Romanian People's Republic.

== Early life ==
Bodnăraș was born in the eastern lands of the Austro-Hungarian Empire in 1904. His father has been described as either a Romanian or a Ukrainian, while his mother was German. His birth place has been reported as either Kolomea in Galicia or Iaslovăț or Câmpulung Moldovenesc in neighbouring Bukovina.

According to journalist Laurențiu Ungureanu, while studying law at the University of Iași, in 1924-1925, Bodnăraș briefly joined the far-right National Romanian Fascio and then the National Christian Defense League, led by A. C. Cuza. On the other hand, the official obituary published on his death, it was during his time in Iași that Bodnăraș first came in contact with Marxist groups. He was supposedly expelled from the University, and in 1925 he enrolled in the Timișoara military school, graduating in 1930 as the top of his class.

Promoted to lieutenant, he was assigned to a garrison in Sadagura, near the Soviet border. Sympathetic to the Soviet cause and dissatisfied with his status within the garrison, in February 1932 he defected by crossing the border near Hotin. Tried in absentia, he was sentenced to ten years in prison for desertion. After training as a spy in Moscow, he was sent by the Soviet secret police in Romania in 1934. Caught by accident shortly after his arrival, Bodnăraș was retried, only to have his previous sentence confirmed. Imprisoned at Galați, Brașov, Doftana, and Caransebeș, he joined the communist political prisoners, claiming to be a member of the Romanian Communist Party (PCR). The Doftana party cell found this to be untrue in 1938, formally expelling him. Nevertheless, having befriended leader Gheorghe Gheorghiu-Dej, he continued to participate in the activities of the communist group. He was released from prison in November 1942.

Being in Brașov Prison, Bodnăraș learned that he had lost Romanian citizenship, being a civil servant in the Soviet Union. "In Brașov Prison I got the USSR citizenship through an official communication made by the Soviet embassy, on the basis of a request that my brother made to the embassy on my behalf. Being a Soviet citizen in those years was advantageous, a citizen of Romania who received Soviet citizenship was a person with whom it was not advisable to be violent or to beat", explained Bodnăraș personally in a stenograph in 1952.

On November 7 or 8, 1942, he was released from Caransebeș Prison, with the consent the SSI (Romanian Intelligence Service) Upon release, "the comrades also gave me a large amount of money, 50,000 lei, which I hid in a box to be sent to my brother with my clothes and things, and personally, I held 10,000 lei. At that time it was a lot of money". He paid 8,000 lei to the security commissioner who issued the documents, to convince him to go over the detail of the Soviet citizenship, which - according to the law - led to the placement in the camp. He arrived in Brăila, where he was sheltered by his brother, Manole. The rest of the money he used to organize - for two years - a lime, cement, and tile business, based in Brăila, which allowed him to trip freely through the country, although he was supervised by the Intelligence Service. In Bucharest, Bodnăraș used to get information from an agent named Kendler, a timber trader who - at Bodnaraș's order - paid 30,000 lei per month to Colonel Enache Borcescu, member of the General Staff of the Army, for information on Romanian and German troops movements. The common place of meetings between Kendler and Borcescu was a Greek Catholic church in Bucharest (according to an interview made by Dennis Deletant with Traian Borcescu, on March 8, 1995). He also arrived at Târgu Jiu, where, simulating an "appendicitis cramps" attack, was hospitalized in the same hospital room with a "sick" patient Gheorghiu-Dej. There, the maneuvers for the annihilation of the RCP's secretariat led by Ștefan Foriș, were drafted; also, the alliance plans were made to create a national front and the decision on Dej's escape was adopted.

== 1944–1947 ==
In 1944, Bodnăraș (together with Iosif Rangheț and Constantin Pîrvulescu) was a key participant in the political elimination and physical isolation of Ștefan Foriș, the General Secretary of the Party. The three of them dominated the leadership of the Party until Dej's escape from prison, in August of the same year. After the massive bombing of Bucharest on 4 April 1944, Bodnăraș and Rangheț captured Foriș and forced him to sign his deposition at gunpoint.

Bodnăraș participated in the 23 August 1944 coup led by King Michael I against the government of Ion Antonescu. He organized underground paramilitary units and coordinated the weakening of a segment of the Moldavian front called "Poarta Iașiului" against the Soviet offensive of August 1944. He was part of a group of communists who took custody of Ion Antonescu after his arrest, and locked him together with Mihai Antonescu in a safe house, before handing them to the Red Army troops.

He became a member of the Romanian Politburo. During March 1945 and November 1947 he became secretary-general of the "Council of Ministers"' presidency, being in charge of secret intelligence services. From this position he was one of the orchestrators of the electoral fraud of 1946 and of the Tămădău Affair.

His enormous influence was due to permanent direct contact with the Soviet secret services (he was reporting on each of the Romanian Communist Party leaders, as revealed later on in the case of Ana Pauker).

== Under Gheorghiu-Dej ==
He held two important positions under Gheorghiu-Dej: Minister of Defense and Vice Premier. On 27 December 1947 he became Minister of Defense, taking over the position previously held by Mihail Lascăr. He held this office until 3 October 1955, while in 1956 he became Minister of Transportation. During his tenure, a Sovietization of the Romanian Army occurred. Bodnăraș sent several Romanian Communists to Moscow to be trained in a special military school, among them the young Nicolae Ceaușescu, who became a close and zealous collaborator and was appointed general and political commissar of the military forces.

He remained one of Gheorghiu-Dej's supporters until Dej's death, and he resisted the restructurations of the Party proposed by Iosif Chișinevschi and Miron Constantinescu.

During the Hungarian Revolution of 1956, Bodnăraș led a body authorized to intervene and open fire in crisis situations. In November, together with Gheorghiu-Dej, he headed up the Romanian delegation visiting Hungary, which held discussions with János Kádár about the support of the suppression of the Hungarian revolution. It seems he also had a key role in influencing Nikita Khrushchev's decision to withdraw the Red Army from Romania in 1958. According to Khrushchev's memoirs, Bodnăraș proposed the withdrawal of the troops at a time which was not in consideration of by the Soviet leaders, while they were expected to stay until the end of the Cold War.

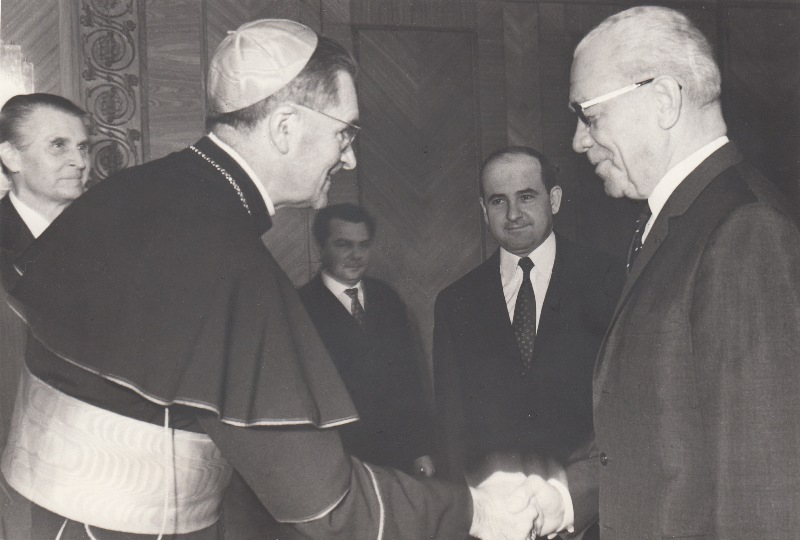
Bodnăraș (right) receiving Cardinal Julius Döpfner, 1971

After Gheorghiu-Dej's death in March 1965, Bodnăraș, as one of the most influential members of the Politburo, decided to support Ceaușescu instead of Gheorghe Apostol or Alexandru Drăghici, thus facilitating Ceaușescu's ascension to the position of General Secretary of the Party.

== Under Ceaușescu ==
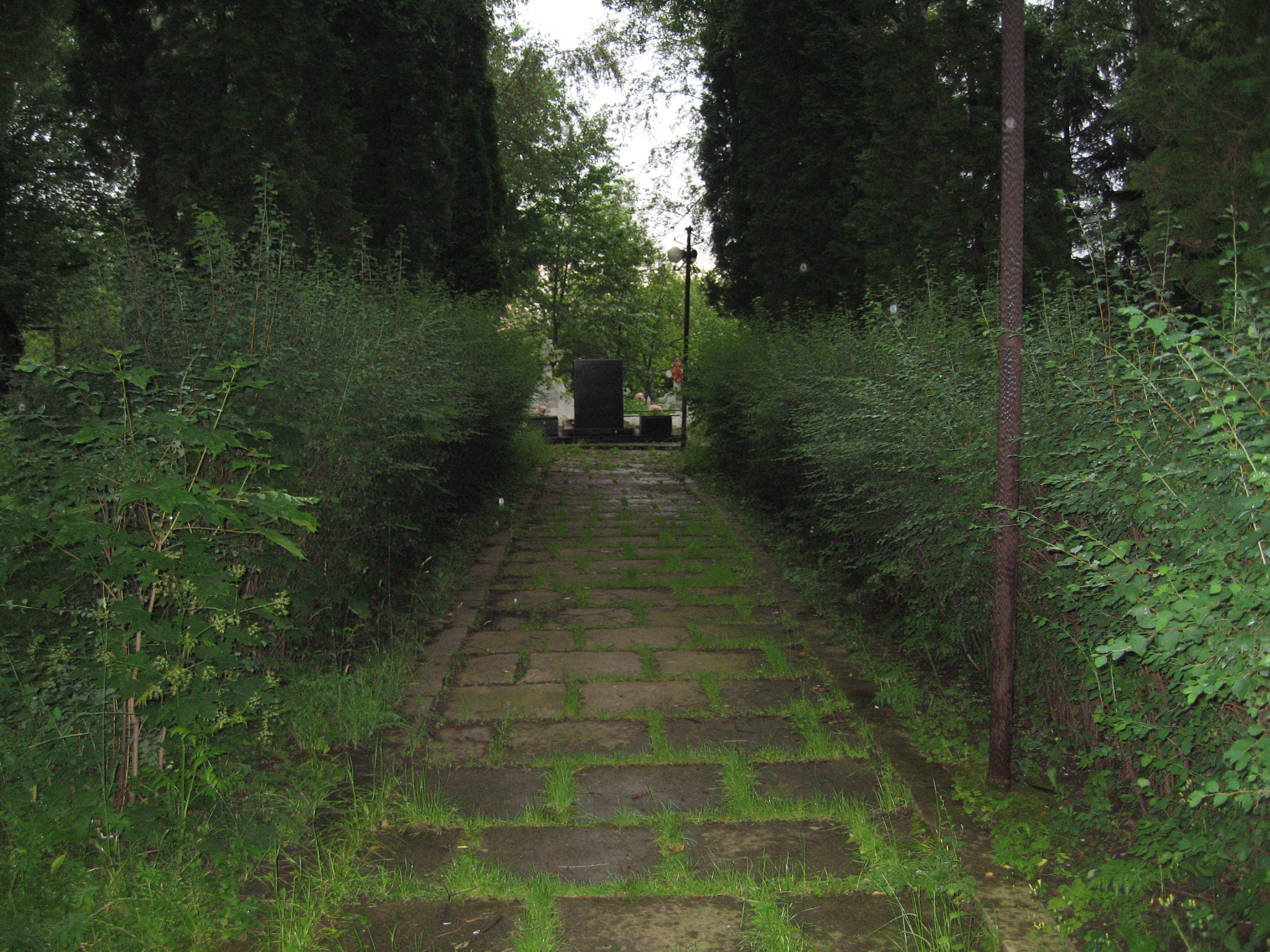
The grave of Bodnăraș in Iaslovăț

Bodnăraș transferred his loyalty to Ceaușescu, receiving in exchange the position of vice president of the State Council, and he remained a member of the Communist élite until his death. He died in 1976 in Bucharest and was buried in his native village, Iaslovăț. The town of Milișăuți was renamed Emil Bodnăraș from 7 September 1976 to 20 May 1996.
