= Voievodeasa (Sucevița) =

- Location within Romania

Location
- Country: Romania
- Counties: Suceava County

Physical characteristics
- Mouth: Sucevița
  - location: Voievodeasa
  - coordinates: 47.7948°N 25.7686°E
- Length: 10 km (6.2 mi)
- Basin size: 20 km^{2} (7.7 sq mi)

Basin features
- Progression: Sucevița→ Suceava→ Siret→ Danube→ Black Sea

The Voievodeasa is a left tributary of the river Sucevița in Romania. It flows into the Sucevița in the village Voievodeasa. Its length is 10 km (6.2 mi) and its basin size is 20 km^{2} (7.7 sq mi).
