= Emanuil Grigorovitza =

Austro-Hungarian-born Romanian writer and philologist

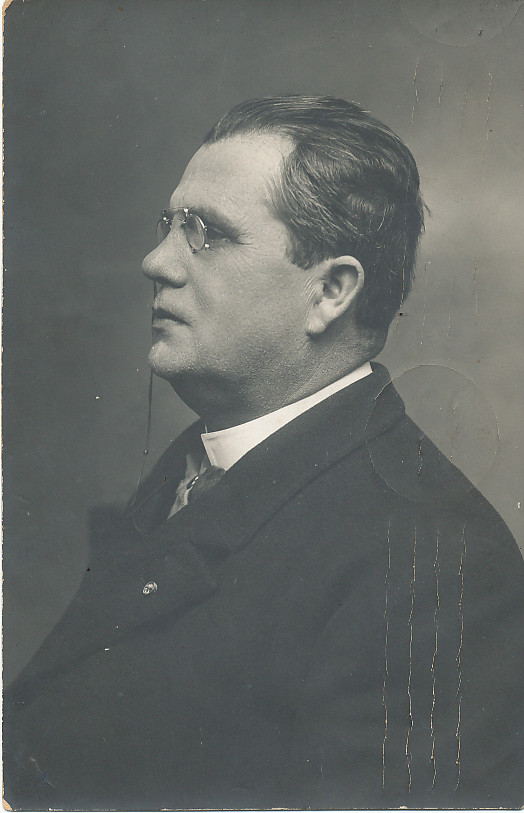
Grigorovitza in 1912

Emanuil Grigorovitza (February 15, 1857–December 6, 1915) was an Austro-Hungarian-born Romanian writer and philologist.

Born in Rădăuți, in the Duchy of Bukovina, his parents were Vasile, a teacher, and Alexandra (née Pintilie); his brother was George Grigorovici. He attended primary school in Storojineț. In 1866, he entered the state gymnasium in Cernăuți. He also obtained pedagogical training and was sent to teach at Hotzenplotz in Silesia. He audited courses at the philosophy faculty of Czernowitz University from 1877 to 1879. He then left for the Romanian Old Kingdom, initially setting at Pașcani, where he taught employees of Lemberg-Czernowitz-Jassy Eisenbahn, then becoming head of the company's Iași translation office. He audited courses at the letters faculty of Iași University, drawing favorable notice from Alexandru Dimitrie Xenopol. He also met and befriended Mihai Eminescu. In 1888, he started teaching at the school for soldiers’ sons and at the National College. In summer 1889, he transferred to the normal school in Bucharest. He also taught at Saint Sava High School, at the Nifon seminary and, from 1891, the Higher War School; he held a permanent position at Matei Basarab High School, where he taught German.

In 1891, he took the baccalaureate examination at Bern. He obtained a doctorate in philosophy from Bern University in 1893, specializing in Slavistics, French and German. He earned a second doctorate from Berlin University in 1901, having audited there as well between 1891 and 1901 while working as an interpreter at the Romanian legation. His courses dealt with philosophy and German philology, while his thesis was about the Czech literary influences on Clemens Brentano. He took courses at the University of Bucharest from 1898 to 1901. His application to become a professor there was rejected due to intrigue. In 1907, as compensation, he was offered the position of associate professor at Iași, which he refused, preferring to remain a high school teacher. He committed suicide in a Bucharest cafe, firing a revolver into his mouth, which killed him instantly. He was pushed to this deed by profound dissatisfaction with his professional and literary failures, compounded by financial difficulties.

He made important contributions in journalism, literature and German philology, becoming one of Romania's first significant Germanists. He wrote ten textbooks, mainly about the German language; dictionaries and numerous studies of philology, literary criticism and history, translations and anthologies. His first academic article, from 1892, was about the role of myths and historical tradition in German folk poetry. His work appeared in Romänische Revue, Vatra, Familia, Literatură și artă română, Patria, Conservatorul, Rumänischer Lloyd, Junimea literară, Die Karpathen, Luceafărul and Flacăra. This consisted of studies, articles, sketches, tales, translations into German (mainly poems by Eminescu) and Romanian (stories by Nikolai Gogol and Henryk Sienkiewicz). His first book of prose fiction, Chipuri și graiuri din vesela grădină…, appeared at Berlin in 1900. Seven more books followed, largely collections of writings previously published in magazines. Schitul Cerebucului (1908) and Piatra muierii (1911), are historical novellas, “banal” and “insubstantial”. Grigorovitza was much more successful when, clearly influenced by Ion Creangă’s Childhood Memories, he tried recreating his early years or the faces and journeys that had left an impression. In sketches such as “Cum era să mă fac catolic”, “Jupânul Toiba” and “Badea Huștiuluc”, and in the 1911 volume Cum a fost odată, he recreates the multiethnic space of northern Bukovina, imparting a fairytale-like ambience to the villages, the picturesque market towns and the city of Cernăuți. With warmth and sensibility, he recalls his parents, his teachers and schoolmates, the friends he made in Vienna and Iași. He sketches the world of the răzeși (peasants owning small plots of land), in particular the women, creatures of habit dwelling among memories, forgotten by time; and compassionately recounts the daily existence of humble characters.
