= Iaslovăț =

- Commune
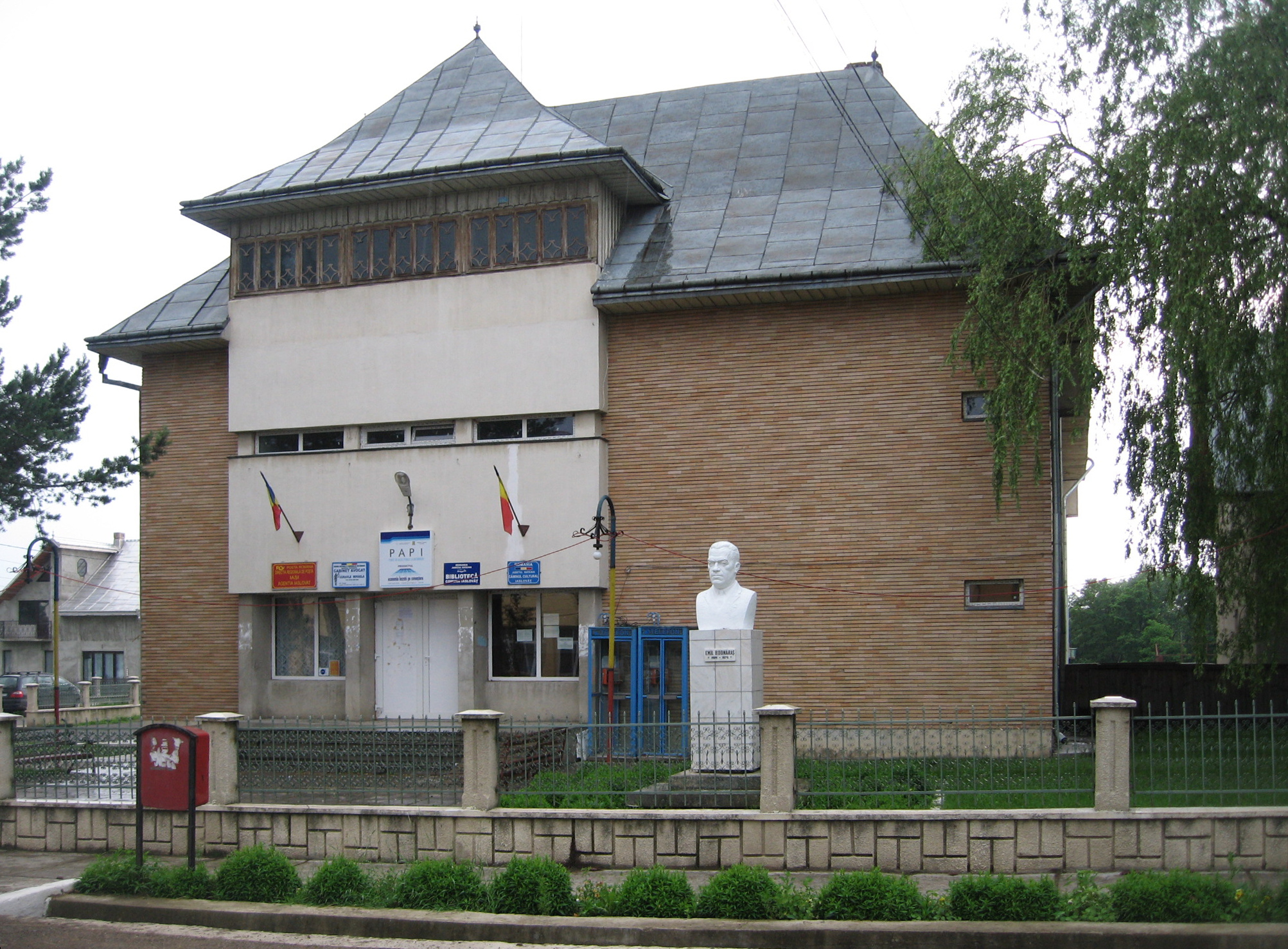
- Community center, with bust of Emil Bodnăraș

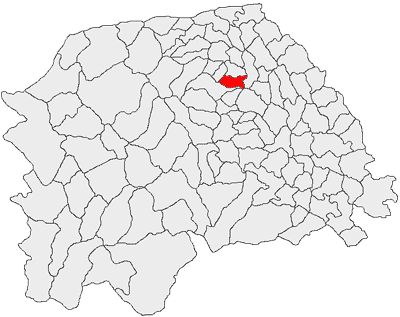
- Location in Suceava County

- Location in Romania
- Coordinates: 47°46′N 25°58′E
- Country: Romania
- County: Suceava

Government
  - Mayor (2020–2024): Ion Cotoară (PSD)
- Area: 18.26 km^{2} (7.05 sq mi)
- Elevation: 362 m (1,188 ft)
- Population (2021-12-01): 4,624
  - Density: 253.2/km^{2} (655.9/sq mi)
- Time zone: UTC+02:00 (EET)
  - Summer (DST): UTC+03:00 (EEST)
- Postal code: 727320
- Area code: +(40) 230
- Vehicle reg.: SV
- Website: www.comunaiaslovat.ro

Iaslovăț (German: Iazlowetz or Jaslowetz, Polish: Jazłowiec) is a commune located in Suceava County, Romania. It is composed of a single village, Iaslovăț. This became part of the then-commune of Milișăuți in 1968. It remained so until 2002, when it was split off. The village is the birthplace of Communist politician Emil Bodnăraș.
