= Milișăuți =

- Town
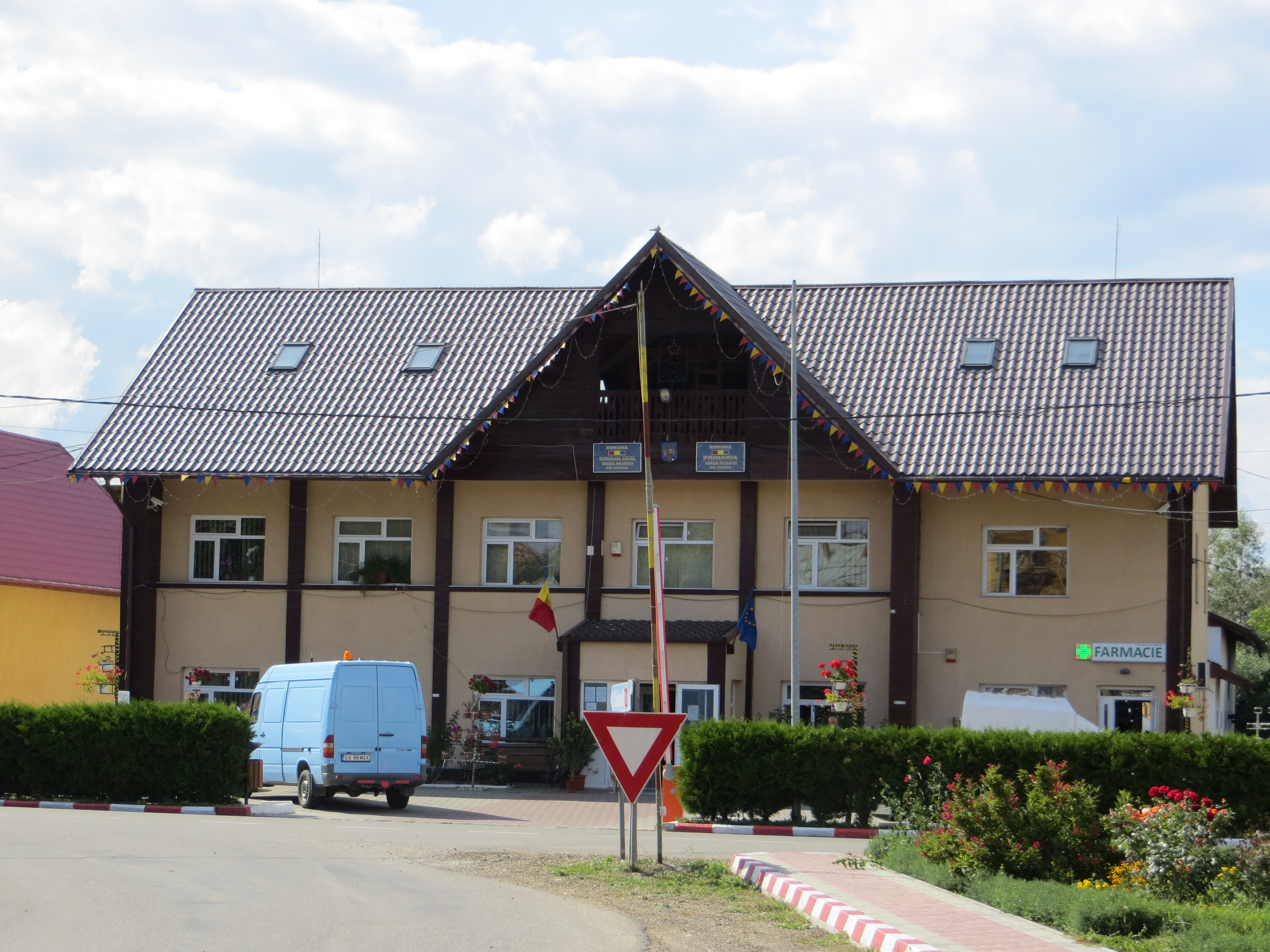
- Milișăuți Town Hall

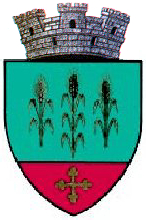
- Coat of arms

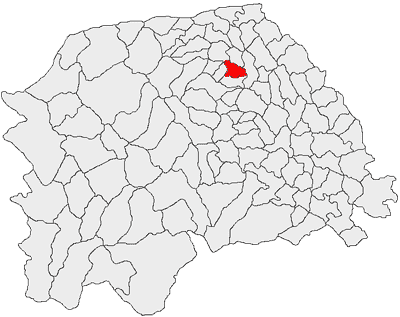
- Location in Suceava County

- Location in Romania
- Coordinates: 47°47′11″N 26°0′16″E
- Country: Romania
- County: Suceava

Government
  - Mayor (2024–2028): Vasile Cărare
- Area: 35.00 km^{2} (13.51 sq mi)
- Elevation: 331 m (1,086 ft)
- Population (2021-12-01): 4,657
  - Density: 133.1/km^{2} (344.6/sq mi)
- Time zone: UTC+02:00 (EET)
  - Summer (DST): UTC+03:00 (EEST)
- Postal code: 727360
- Area code: (+40) 02 30
- Vehicle reg.: SV
- Website: www.primariamilisauti.ro

Historical population
Year	Pop.	±%
2002	8,433	—
2011	4,958	−41.2%
2021	4,657	−6.1%
Source: Census data

Milișăuți (German: Milleschoutz) is a town in Suceava County, northeastern Romania. It is situated in the historical regions of Bukovina and Western Moldavia. Milișăuți is the fifteenth largest urban settlement in the county, with a population of 4,657 inhabitants, according to the 2021 census.

It was declared a town in 2004, along with seven other localities in Suceava County. The town administers the former village of Bădeuți (German: Deutsch Badeutz or Badeutz Deutsch), which became a neighborhood in 2004, and Gara and Lunca, with the status of associated villages.

Iaslovăț village was also part of Milișăuți until 2002, when it was split off to form a separate commune. The commune was called Emil Bodnăraș from 7 September 1976 to 20 May 1996.

Milișăuți lies on the banks of Suceava River. It is located in the north-central part of the county, 8 km (5.0 mi) from Rădăuți. Despite being a town, the main occupation of the local people is agriculture. Milișăuți is known for its production of cabbage and cucumber. In the past, the town was also inhabited by a German community, more specifically by Bukovina Germans.

== Administration and local politics ==
=== Town council ===
The town's former local council had the following political composition, according to the results of the 2020 Romanian local elections:

Party	Seats	Current Council
Save Romania Union (USR)	5	
Social Democratic Party (PSD)	5	
People's Movement Party (PMP)	2	
National Liberal Party (PNL)	2	
Alliance for the Union of Romanians (AUR)	1	

The town's current local council has the following political composition, according to the results of the 2024 Romanian local elections:

Party	Seats	Current Council
United Right Alliance (ADU)	8	
Social Democratic Party (PSD)	6	
National Liberal Party (PNL)	1	
