= Temnos =

Greek polis in Ancient Aeolis

Coordinates: 38°40′19″N 27°11′49″E

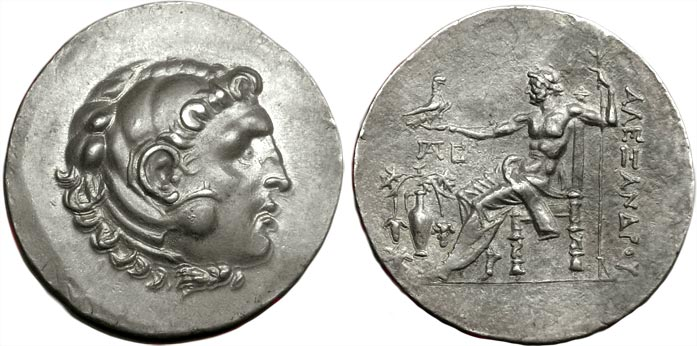
Posthumous Alexander the Great tetradrachm minted at Temnos c. 188-170 BC

Temnos or Temnus (Ancient Greek: Τῆμνος; Aeolic Greek: Τᾶμνος) was a small Greek polis (city-state) of ancient Aeolis, later incorporated in the Roman province of Asia, on the western coast of Anatolia. Its bishopric was a suffragan of Ephesus, the capital and metropolitan see of the province, and is included in the Catholic Church's list of titular sees.

== History ==
The little town was near the Hermus River, which is shown on its coins. Situated at elevation it commanded a view of the territories of Cyme, Phocaea, and Smyrna. Under Augustus it was already on the decline; under Tiberius it was destroyed by an earthquake; and in the time of Pliny it was no longer inhabited. It was, however, rebuilt later.

One of the city's more noteworthy figures was the rhetorician Hermagoras.

During the Byzantine period, most probably, it was renamed to Archangelus. In 1413 the Turks seized the fortress of Archangelus, which they called Kaiadjik, i.e., small rock; this fortress was situated on the plains of Maenomenus, now known as Menemen.

== Location ==
Its site is located near Görece, Asiatic Turkey.

== Bishops ==
Le Quien mentions three bishops:

- Eustathius, who lived in 451;
- Theophilus, present at the Council of Nice (787);
- Ignatius, at Constantinople (869).

This see is not mentioned in the Notitiae Episcopatuum. Ramsay (Asia Minor, 108) thought the diocese of Temnus identical with that of Archangelus, which from the tenth to the thirteenth century the Notitiae Episcopatuum assigns to Smyrna.

== See also ==
- List of ancient Greek cities
