= Rădăuți =

- Municipality
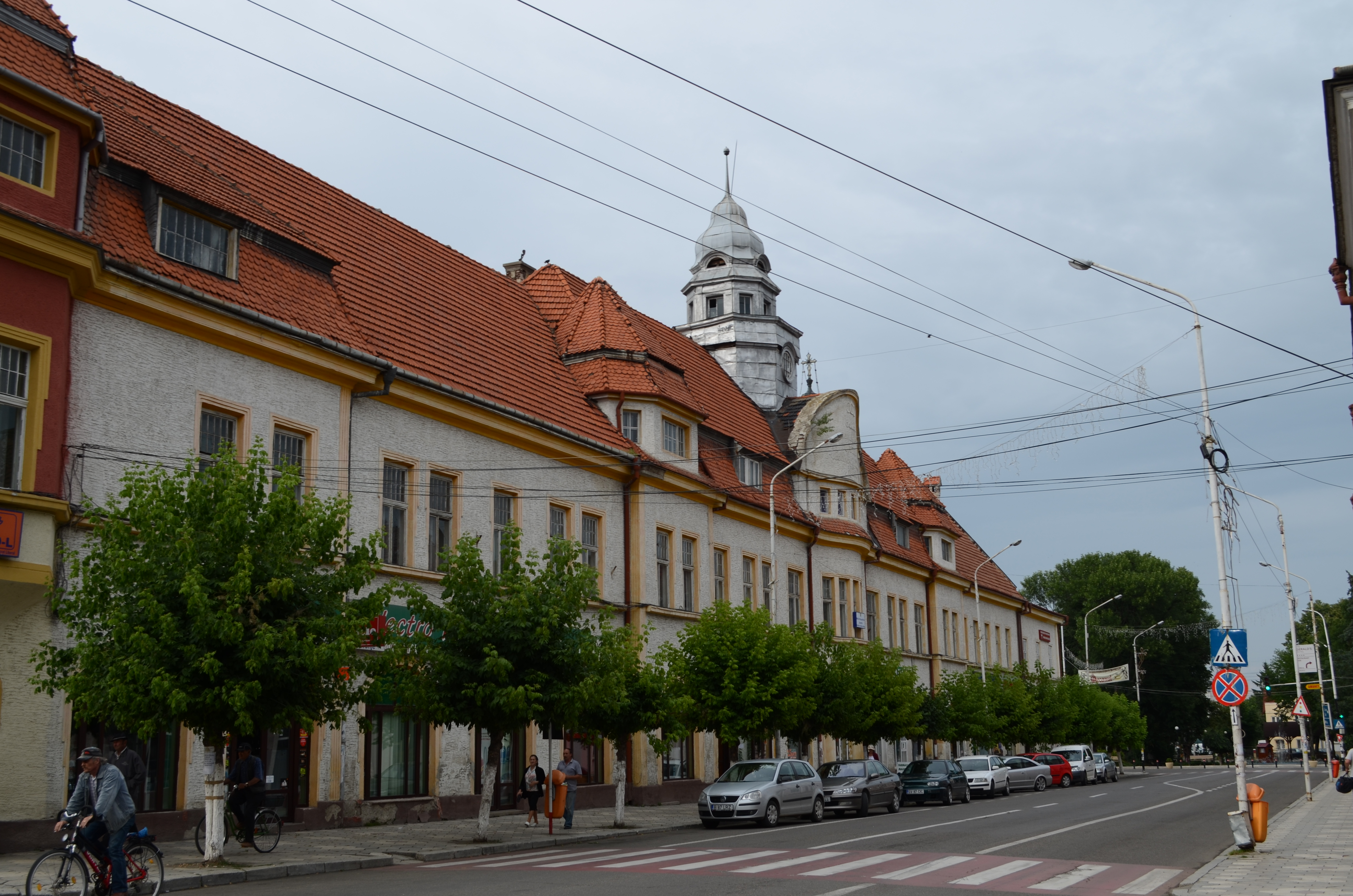
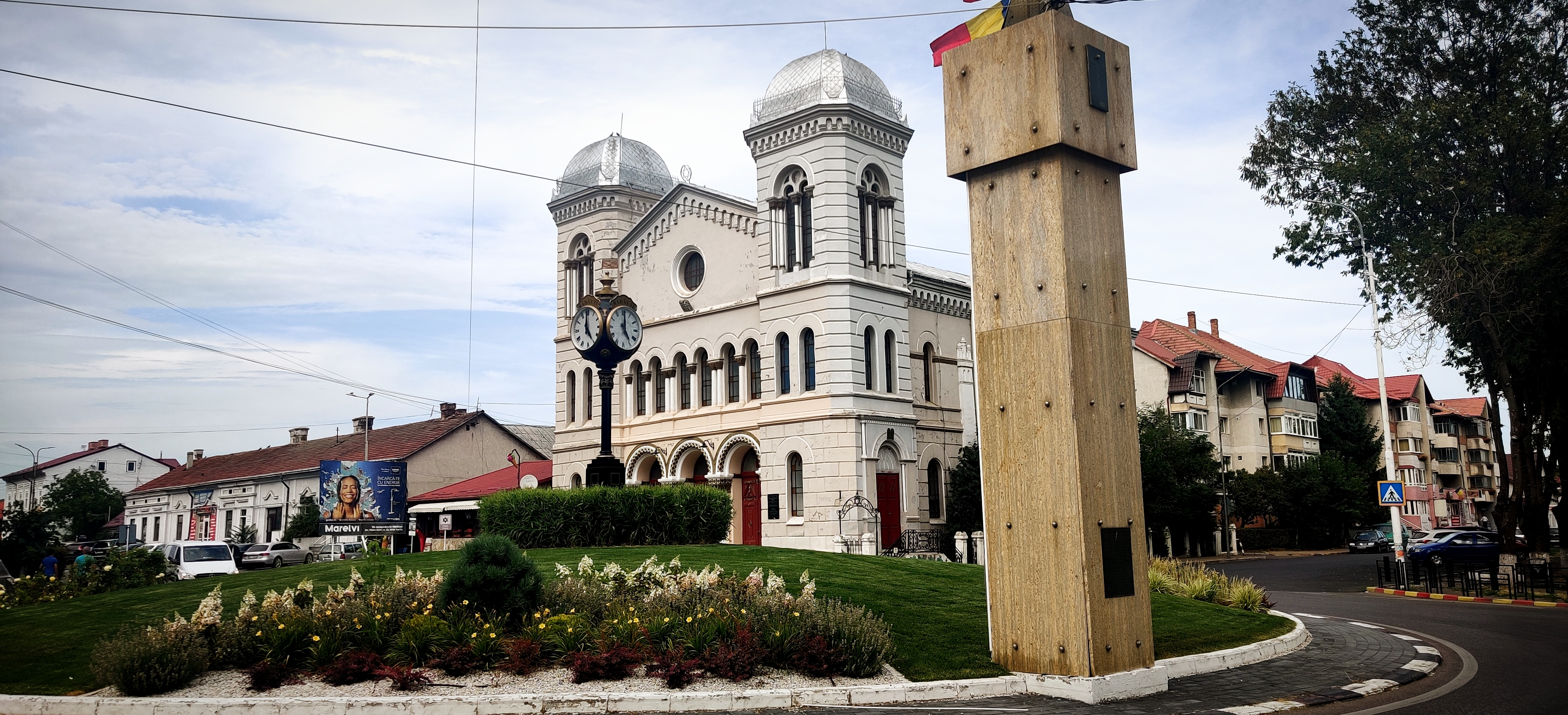
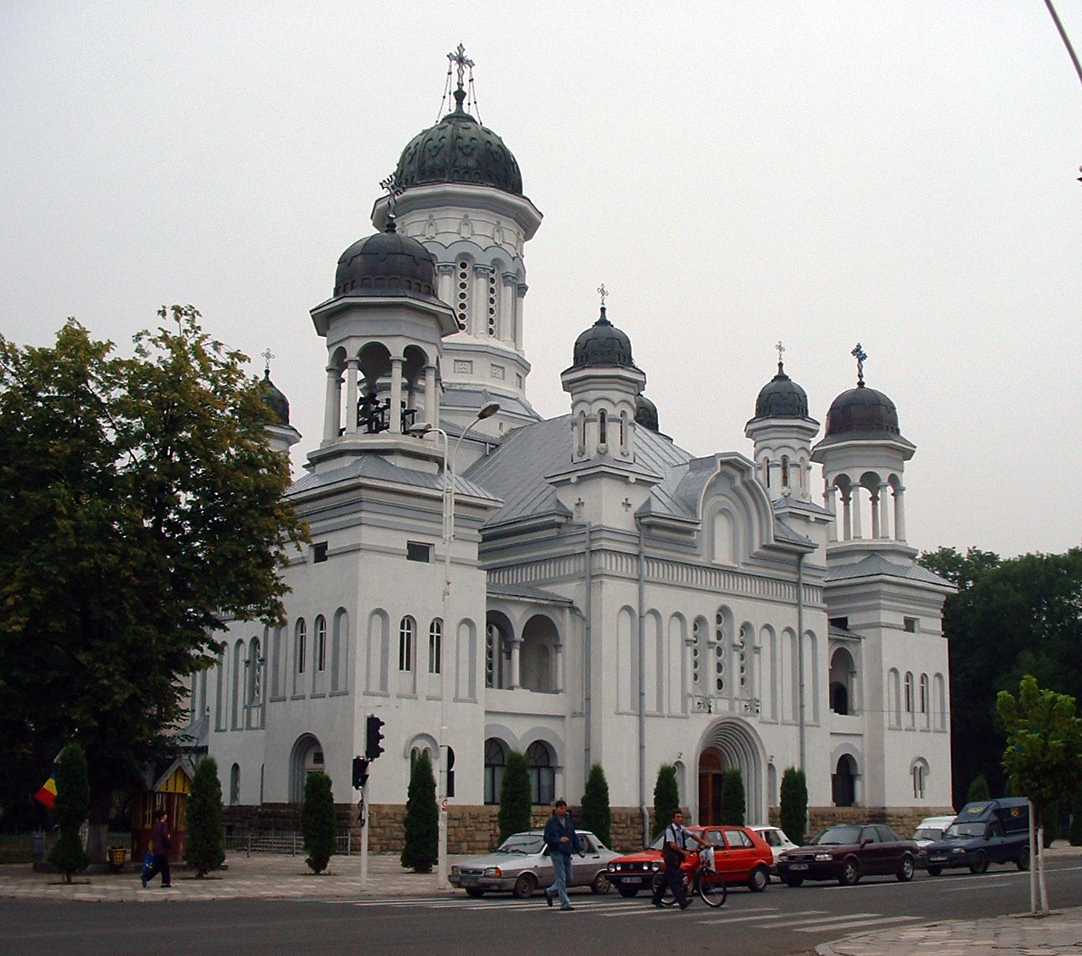
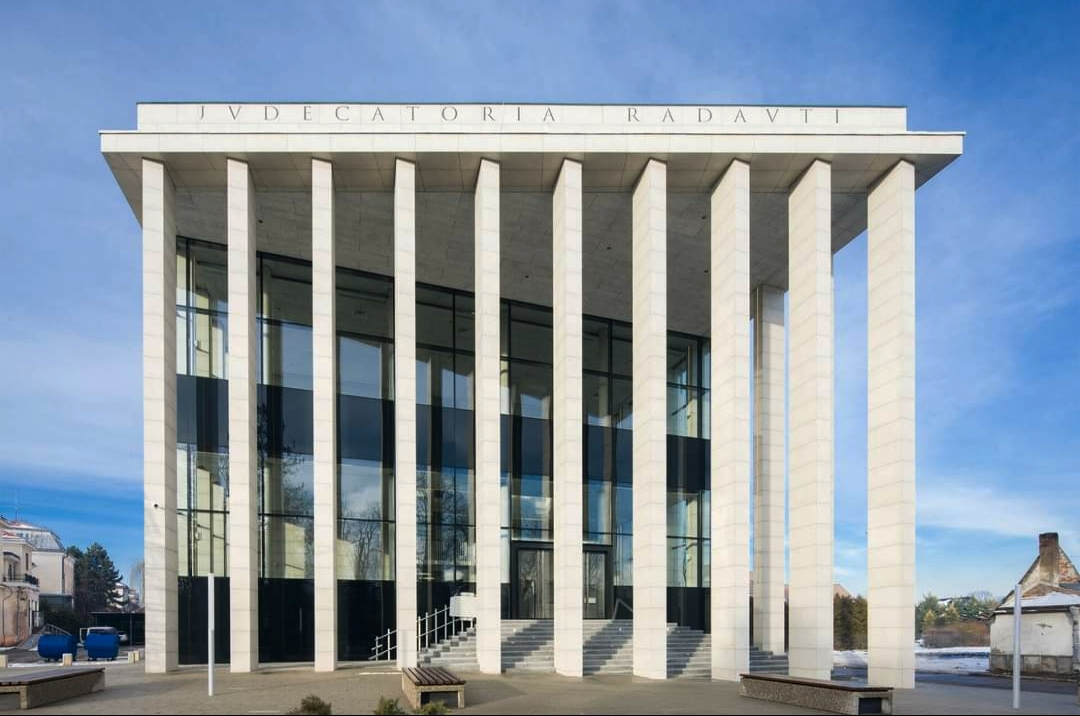
- Union Square in downtown Rădăuți The Jewish Temple The Orthodox Cathedral Rădăuți Court

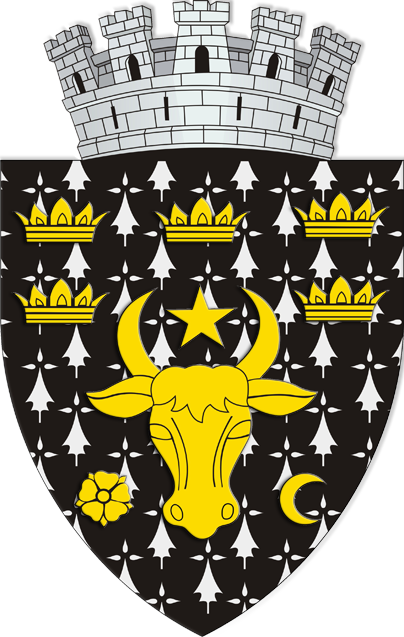
- Coat of arms

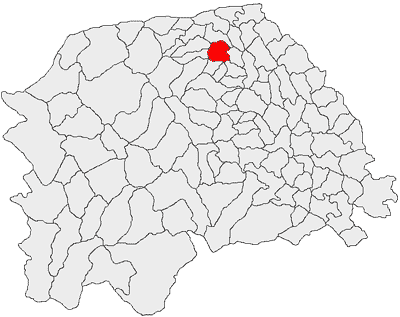
- Location in Suceava County

- Location in Romania
- Coordinates: 47°50′33″N 25°55′9″E
- Country: Romania
- County: Suceava

Government
  - Mayor (2024–2028): Bogdan Loghin (PNL)
- Area: 32.30 km^{2} (12.47 sq mi)
- Elevation: 374 m (1,227 ft)
- Population (2021-12-01): 24,292
  - Density: 752.1/km^{2} (1,948/sq mi)
- Time zone: UTC+02:00 (EET)
  - Summer (DST): UTC+03:00 (EEST)
- Postal code: 725400
- Area code: (+40) 02 30
- Vehicle reg.: SV
- Website: primariaradauti.ro

Rădăuți (Romanian pronunciation: [rədəˈut͡sʲ]; German: Radautz; Hungarian: Radóc; Polish: Radowce; Ukrainian: Радівці, Radivtsi; Yiddish: ראַדעװיץ Radevits; Turkish: Radoviçe) is a town in Suceava County, north-eastern Romania. It is situated in the historical regions of Bukovina and Western Moldavia. According to the 2021 census, Rădăuți is the second largest urban settlement in the county. It was declared a municipality in 1995, along with two other cities in Suceava County: Fălticeni and Câmpulung Moldovenesc. Rădăuți covers an area of 32.30 km^{2} (12.47 sq mi) and it was the capital of former Rădăuți County (until 1950).

== History ==
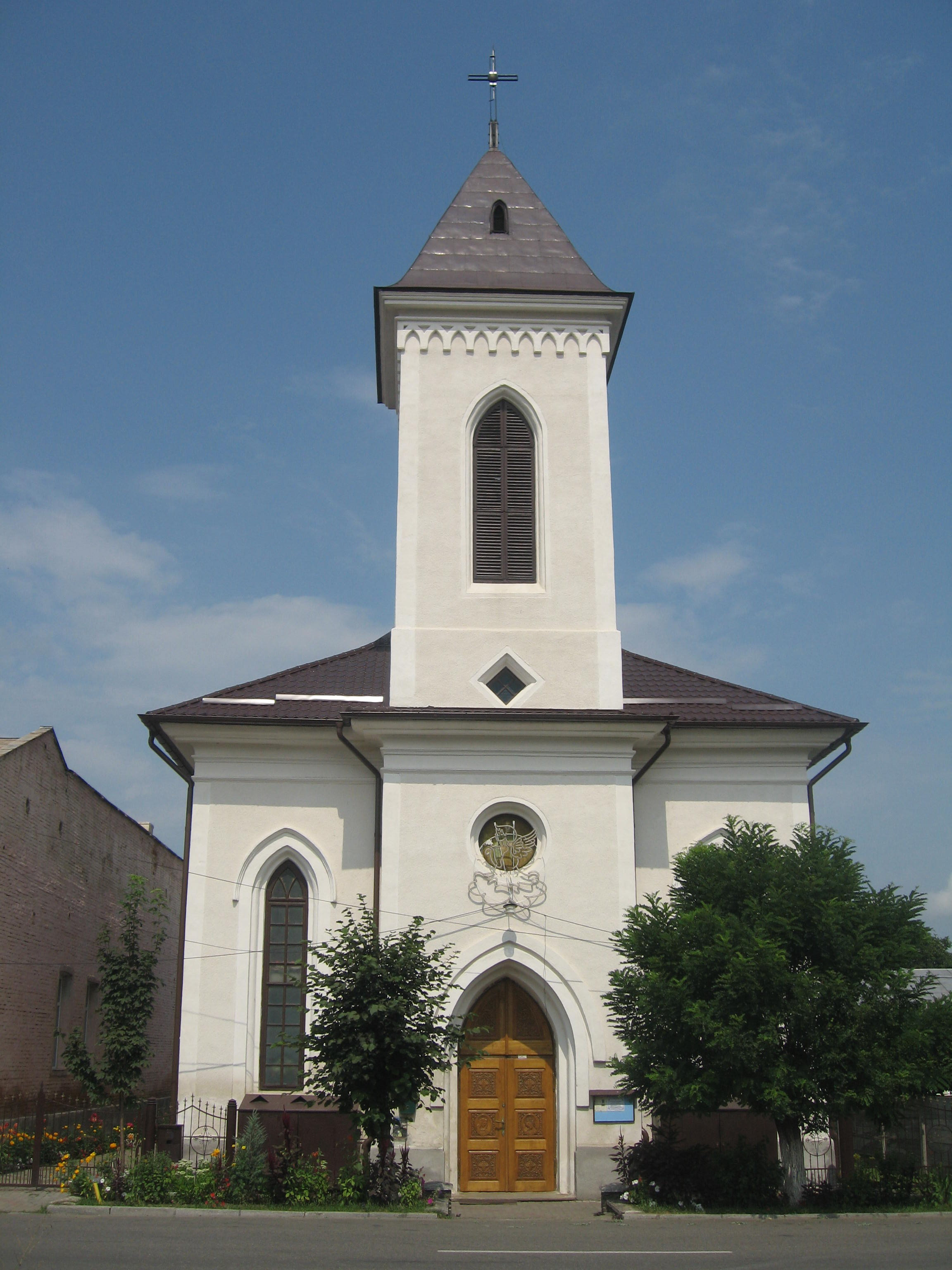
The former Evangelical Lutheran church of the German community in Rădăuți

The mention of "Radomir's village" (as part of a review of boyar property in the area) in a 1392 document (uric) is generally believed to be the town's first mention, and indication of the origin of the name Rădăuți (other theories state that the settlement had its origins in earlier periods, and that the name is a Slavic-influenced derivative of the Latin word Rottacenum, as allegedly used by soldiers in the Roman garrison in Siret). The oldest mention of Rădăuți as such dates from 1413, in a document issued by Moldavian Prince Alexandru cel Bun.

By the middle of the 14th century, Rădăuți was already a flourishing settlement, the seat of a prominent Eastern Orthodox church during the times of Bogdan I (1359–1365), and subsequently a bishopric. Around the St. Nicholas church (Bogdana Monastery), archaeologists have uncovered a habitation layer preceding Bogdan's period of rule, one which could point to the existence of a local center prior to the foundation of Moldavia.

Awarded the privilege of organizing fairs, Rădăuți evolved due to its favorable location midway between the Carpathian Mountains and the tableland area (with traders from both regions establishing contact in the local market). The fairs at Rădăuți have been dated to the time of Stephen the Great (a document from 1481; however, since the mention includes details of Stephen's intervention in solving a commercial dispute, it is possible that the fairs were well established by then).

Rădăuți has a cathedral, built in 1402, with the tombs of several Moldavian princes. Rădăuți was also the seat of a Greek bishopric, moved to Chernivtsi in 1786.

Rădăuți was one of the largest cities of the Duchy of Bukovina during the period of Habsburg administration (1775–1918). During that time it saw a high level of German (especially Swabian) immigration, which would later form the basis for the Bukovina Germans in the whole region.

== Jewish history of Rădăuți ==
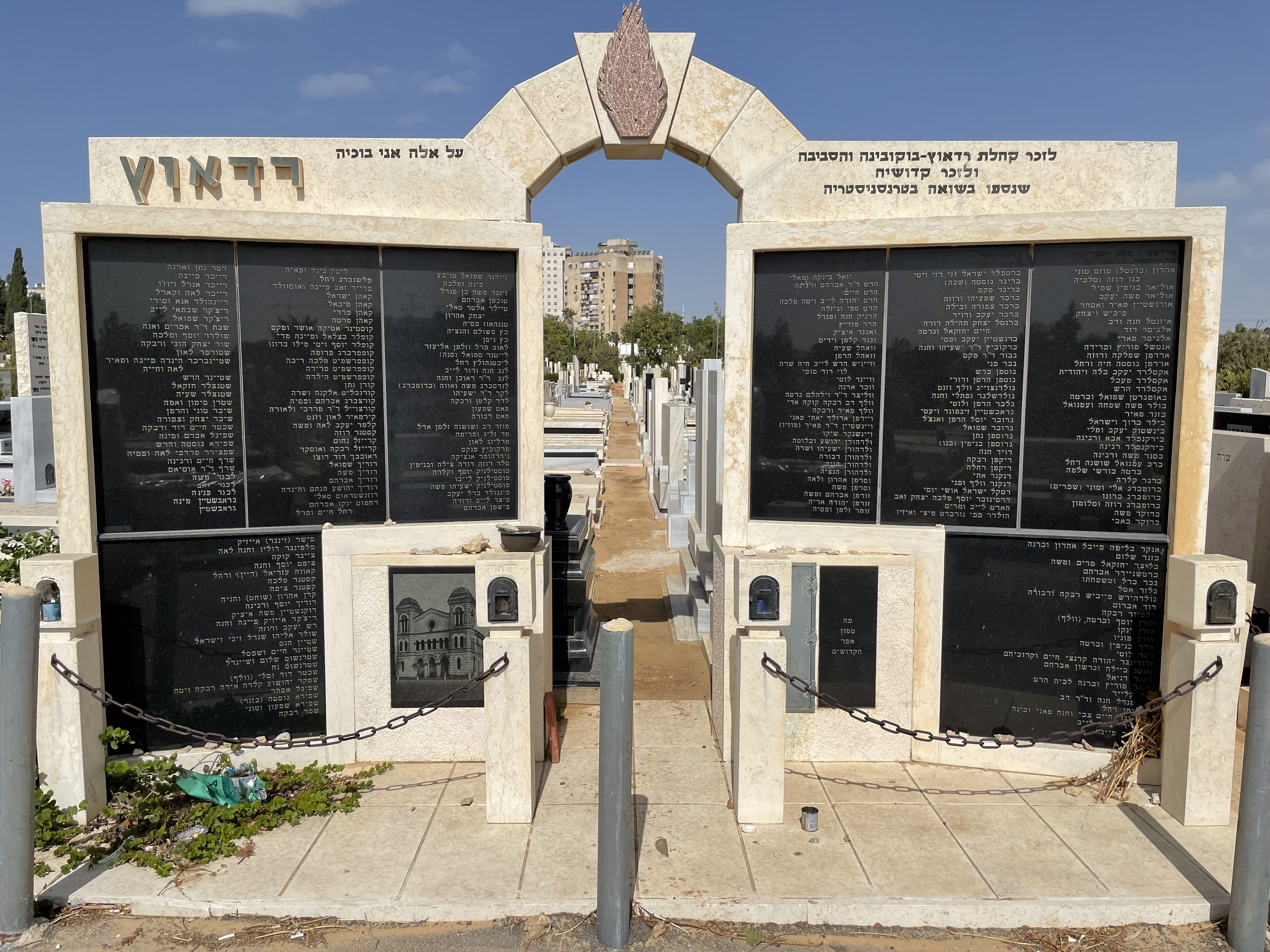
Rădăuți Holocaust memorial, Holon cemetery, Israel

A Jewish community was present before the Habsburg takeover, and is attested to have been overseen by a starost.

Many Jews fleeing the Kingdom of Galicia and Lodomeria (as well as other Habsburg areas) from intense persecution and anti-Semitism during the Middle Ages settled in Rădăuți. The community was allowed a degree of self-administration, and witnessed a period of prosperity and cultural effervescence during the 19th century.

It has been argued that the majority of Rădăuți's Jewish population was exterminated during the Holocaust. However, a Romanian official document from 1946 suggests that most Jews in Rădăuți County survived the Holocaust. Persecutions became widespread around 1938, when Jews were harassed and attacked by authorities under the Octavian Goga government; they were confirmed by anti-Semitic legislation passed by the Ion Gigurtu cabinet, and, in late 1940, exceptionally violent following the establishment of the National Legionary State. In October 1941, all Jews present in Rădăuți, from the city itself and throughout the county (8,000 people), were deported to ghettos and concentration camps in Transnistria Governorate. It has been argued that only 4,000 members of the Rădăuți Jewish community survived the Holocaust. This number did not include the other urban Jewish community in the county (Siret); in 1941, there were originally more than 5,000 Jews in the city of Rădăuți. On March 14, 1944, Romania's military dictator Ion Antonescu allowed the repatriation of all the Jews deported to Transnistria.

Historical population
Year	Pop.	±%
1910	16,535	—
1930	16,788	+1.5%
1948	14,530	−13.5%
1956	15,949	+9.8%
1966	18,580	+16.5%
1977	21,869	+17.7%
1992	31,074	+42.1%
2002	27,633	−11.1%
2011	23,822	−13.8%
2021	24,292	+2.0%
Source: Austrian and Romanian census data and/or official estimates

== Demographics ==
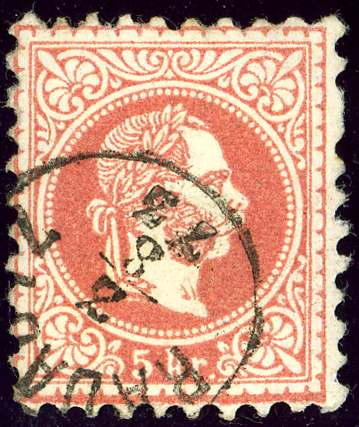
Austrian KK stamp, issue 1873, cancelled at Radautz

Rădăuți reached its peak population in 1992, when more than 31,000 people were living within the city limits. As of 2016, the town of Rădăuți was the second most populated urban settlement in Suceava County, after the county capital, Suceava.

At the 2011 census, Rădăuți had a population of 23,822 inhabitants: 96.97% of inhabitants were ethnic Romanians, 0.89% Russians and Lipovans, 0.88% Roma, 0.54% Ukrainians and 0.23% Germans (Bukovina Germans). 83.4% were Romanian Orthodox, 9.1% Pentecostal, 3.1% Roman Catholic, 0.9% stated they belonged to another religion, 0.8% were Greek-Catholic and 0.7% each Baptist and Lipovan Orthodox.

== Geography ==
Rădăuți is situated in Bukovina, on a plain between the Suceava and Sucevița rivers, 37 km (23 mi) northwest from Suceava, the county capital. The city is located in the depression with the same name, at 375 metres (410 yards) altitude. It is one of the oldest settlements in Moldavia, known since the 15th century. The towns of Siret, Solca, Milișăuți, and Vicovu de Sus are located relatively close to the city, in the Rădăuți urban area of influence.

=== Climate ===
The climate is temperate-continental with Baltic influences. The predominant sector of climatic influence is continental, with the crivăț occurring frequently during the winter period. The Scandinavian-Baltic climatic influences are felt across the municipality of Rădăuți, bringing the circulation of polar air masses during the cold season.

Climate data for Rădăuți (elevation 389m, 2014–2026 normals, extremes 1950–present)
Month	Jan	Feb	Mar	Apr	May	Jun	Jul	Aug	Sep	Oct	Nov	Dec	Year
Record high °C (°F)	20.2 (68.4)	21.0 (69.8)	27.5 (81.5)	28.9 (84.0)	37.7 (99.9)	35.4 (95.7)	36.3 (97.3)	37.2 (99.0)	35.3 (95.5)	30.5 (86.9)	24.5 (76.1)	20.2 (68.4)	37.7 (99.9)
Mean maximum °C (°F)	13.2 (55.8)	14.7 (58.5)	20.4 (68.7)	24.2 (75.6)	27.7 (81.9)	31.8 (89.2)	32.8 (91.0)	33.6 (92.5)	29.7 (85.5)	24.7 (76.5)	19.6 (67.3)	14.5 (58.1)	34.5 (94.1)
Mean daily maximum °C (°F)	2.9 (37.2)	5.0 (41.0)	10.0 (50.0)	15.4 (59.7)	20.0 (68.0)	24.4 (75.9)	26.7 (80.1)	27.0 (80.6)	22.1 (71.8)	15.4 (59.7)	8.4 (47.1)	4.7 (40.5)	15.2 (59.3)
Daily mean °C (°F)	−1.3 (29.7)	0.5 (32.9)	4.6 (40.3)	9.4 (48.9)	14.1 (57.4)	18.8 (65.8)	20.5 (68.9)	20.3 (68.5)	15.8 (60.4)	9.8 (49.6)	4.3 (39.7)	1.0 (33.8)	9.8 (49.7)
Mean daily minimum °C (°F)	−5.4 (22.3)	−3.9 (25.0)	−0.8 (30.6)	3.4 (38.1)	8.2 (46.8)	13.1 (55.6)	14.3 (57.7)	13.5 (56.3)	9.5 (49.1)	4.2 (39.6)	0.3 (32.5)	−2.7 (27.1)	4.5 (40.1)
Mean minimum °C (°F)	−18.4 (−1.1)	−14.2 (6.4)	−8.8 (16.2)	−3.8 (25.2)	1.0 (33.8)	7.3 (45.1)	8.9 (48.0)	8.4 (47.1)	1.9 (35.4)	−3.0 (26.6)	−7.4 (18.7)	−12.6 (9.3)	−20.1 (−4.2)
Record low °C (°F)	−32.5 (−26.5)	−32.0 (−25.6)	−24.4 (−11.9)	−13.5 (7.7)	−4.1 (24.6)	0.5 (32.9)	4.5 (40.1)	2.6 (36.7)	−4.2 (24.4)	−9.4 (15.1)	−23.4 (−10.1)	−34.2 (−29.6)	−34.2 (−29.6)
Average precipitation mm (inches)	18.7 (0.74)	26.4 (1.04)	31.5 (1.24)	40.9 (1.61)	71.7 (2.82)	96.7 (3.81)	81.1 (3.19)	51.2 (2.02)	54.5 (2.15)	48.9 (1.93)	29.2 (1.15)	25.4 (1.00)	576.2 (22.7)
Average precipitation days (≥ 1.0 mm)	5.1	5.7	5.5	7.2	9.9	9.9	8.7	5.9	7.7	6.8	5.5	5.7	83.6
Average snowy days	6.7	6.2	3.2	1.8	0.1	0	0	0	0.1	0.3	3.2	5.7	27.3
Source: Meteomanz (2014-2026); Teza Doctorat (1950-2010)

== Administration and local politics ==
=== Town council ===
The town's former local council had the following political composition, according to the results of the 2020 Romanian local elections:

Party	Seats	Current Council
National Liberal Party (PNL)	9	
Social Democratic Party (PSD)	7	
People's Movement Party (PMP)	2	
Romanian Ecologist Party (PER)	1	

The town's current local council has the following political composition, according to the results of the 2024 Romanian local elections:

Party	Seats	Current Council
National Liberal Party (PNL)	9	
Social Democratic Party (PSD)	8	
Alliance for the Union of Romanians (AUR)	2	

== Bogdana Monastery ==
The Princely Church at Rădăuți contained the graves of Bogdan I and his son Lațcu, both Voivodes/Princes of Moldavia, as well as a later ruler, Roman I of Moldavia. Is the oldest monastery from Moldova and Bucovina (1365). Inside the monastery there are 14 tombs (like Bogdan I (1359–1365), Lațcu Voievod (1365–1373), Roman I (1391–1394), Ștefan I (1394–1399), Bogdan, the brother Alexandru cel Bun, Bogdan, son of Alexandru cel Bun and others.

== Twin towns — Sister cities ==
Rădăuți is twinned with:

- Beilstein, Germany
- Pontault-Combault, France
- Drochia, Moldova
- Briceni, Moldova
- Caminha, Portugal
- Gliwice, Poland
- Kyrenia, Cyprus
- Ragusa, Italy

== Natives ==
- Avigdor Arikha - Israeli painter
- Emil Armin - American artist
- Alexandru Bodnar - athlete
- Heinrich Gärtner - cinematographer
- Emanuil Grigorovitza - writer
- Karl Klüger - Deputy Mayor of Cernăuți
- Irina Lauric - sprint canoeist
- Iacov Putneanul - Metropolitan
- Saint Bishop Leontie of Rădăuți
- Benedict Menkes - Romanian biologist
- Dan Pagis - Israeli Hebrew poet and literature researcher
- Lothar Rădăceanu - journalist, linguist, socialist, and communist politician
- Ștefan Rusu - Olympic champion in Greco-Roman wrestling
- Matei Vișniec - Romanian poet and playwright living in France

== Gallery ==
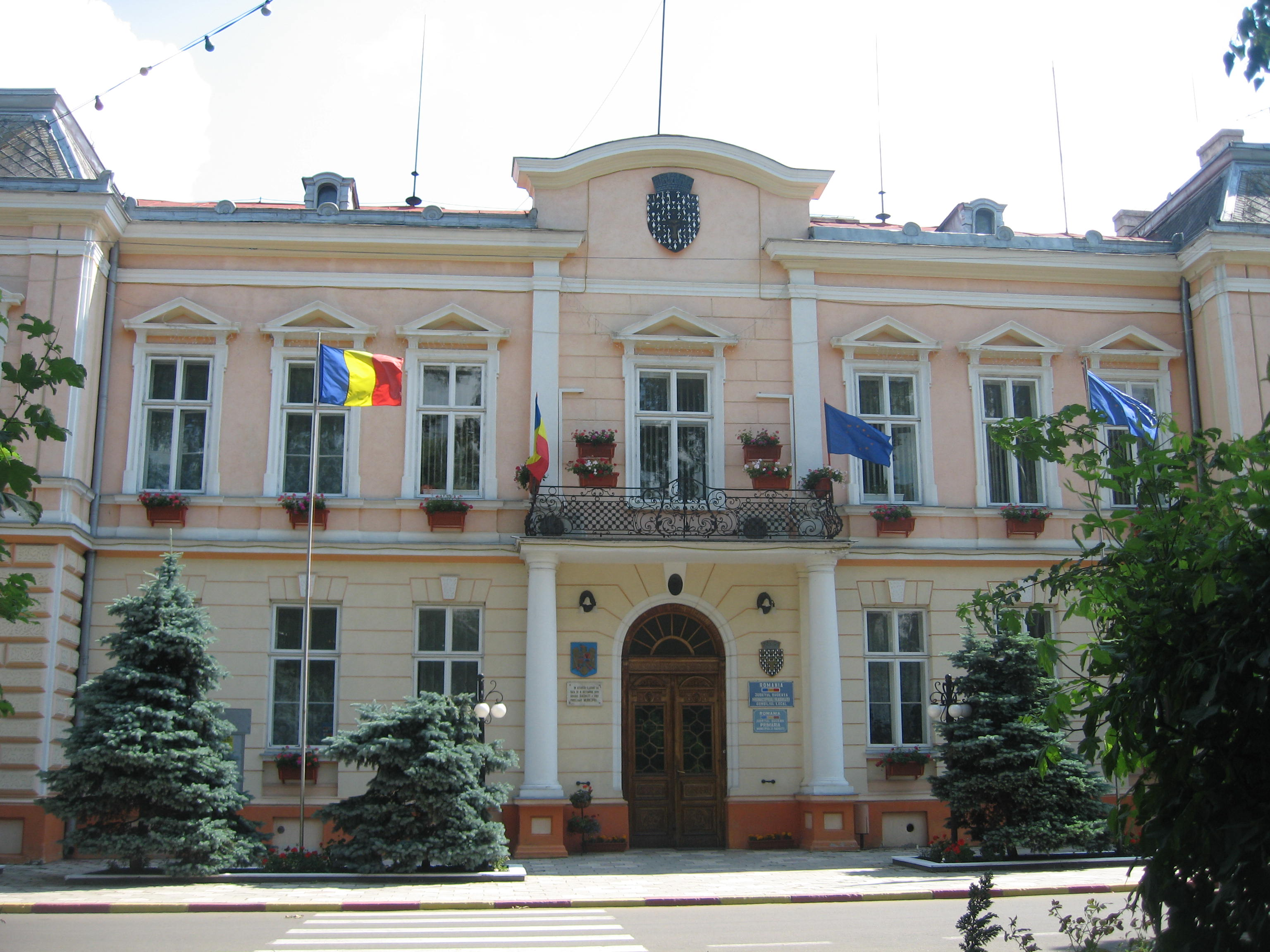
The Town Hall

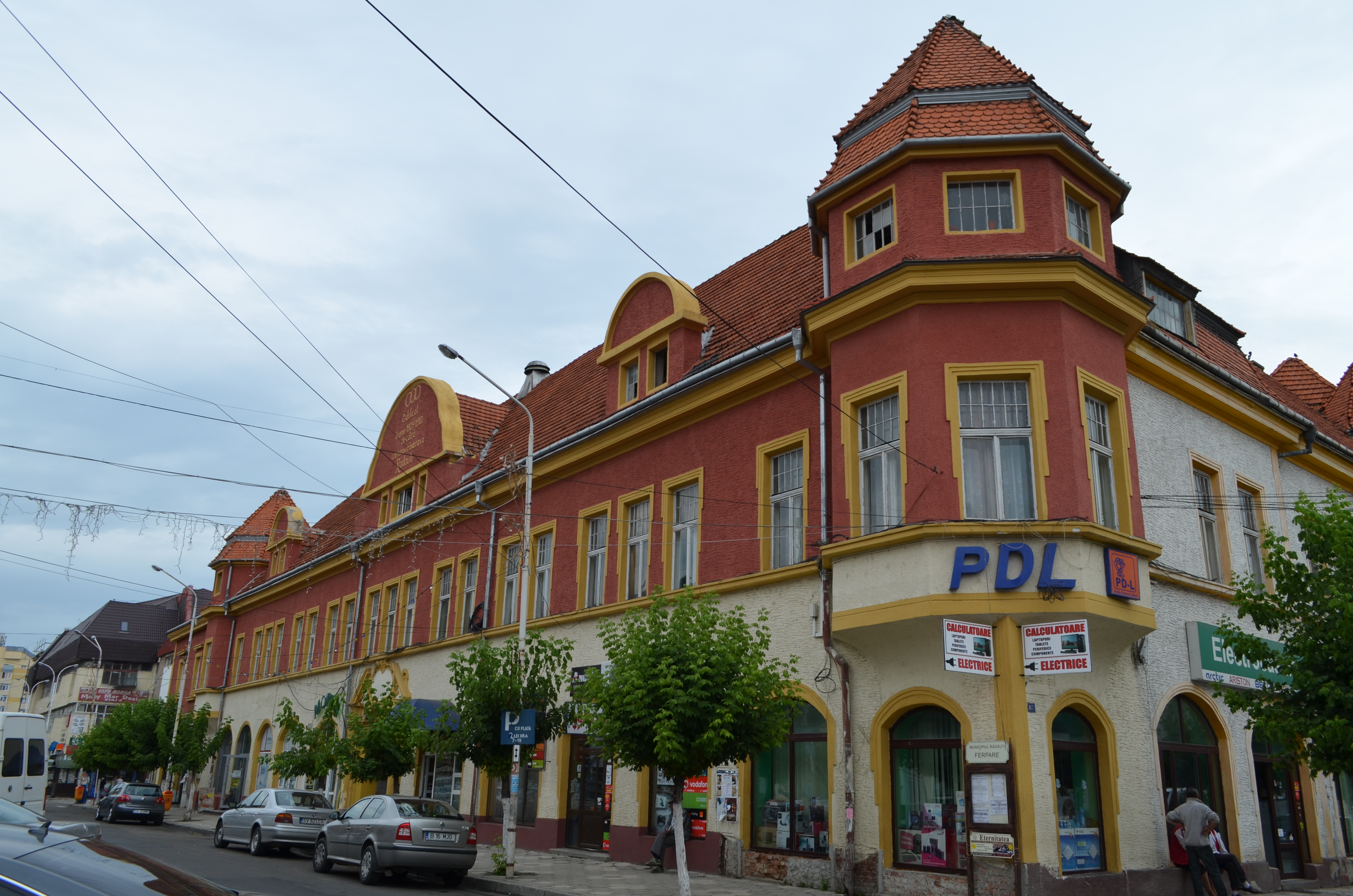
Former prefecture building in Union Square

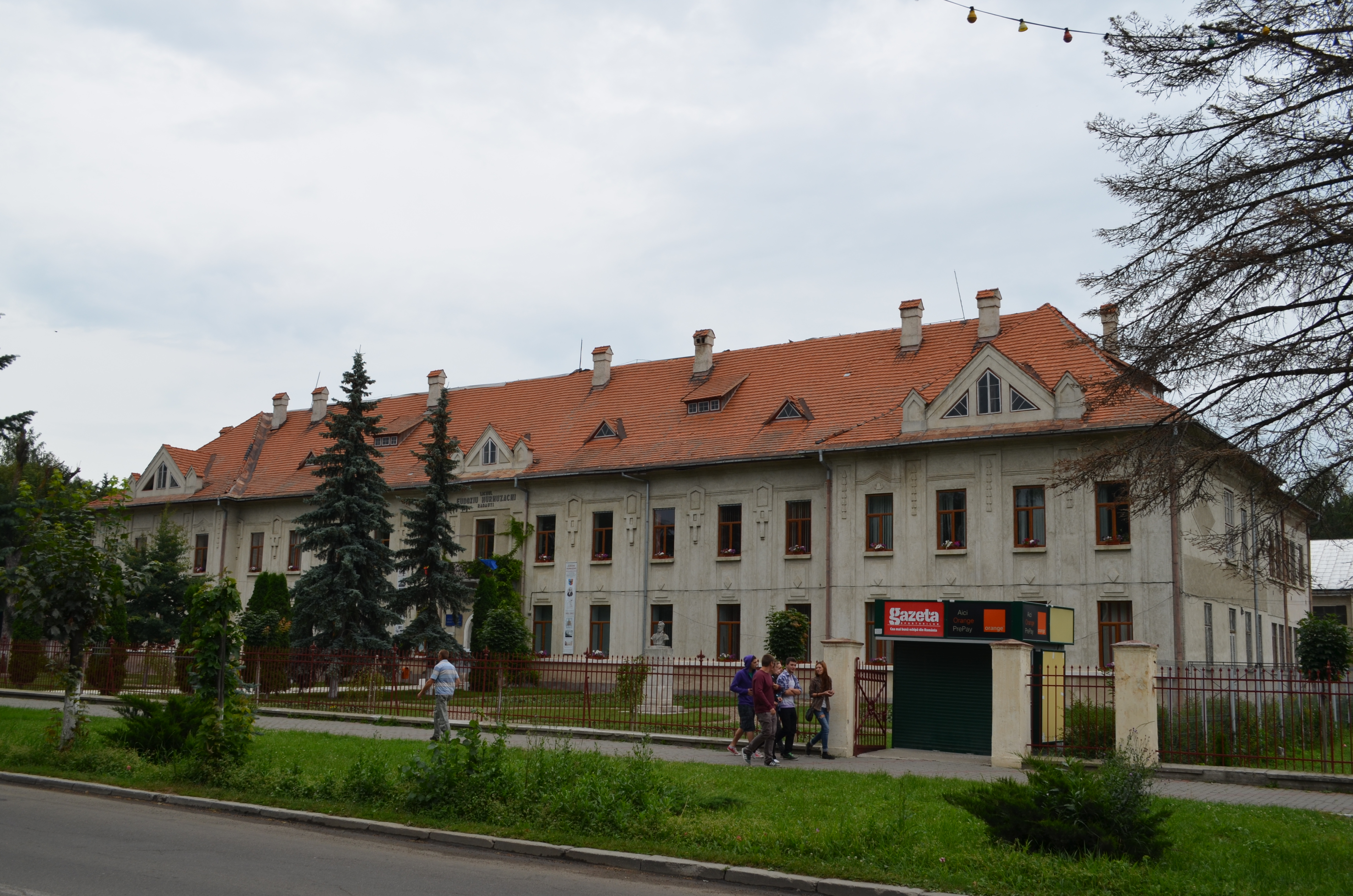
Eudoxiu Hurmuzachi High School

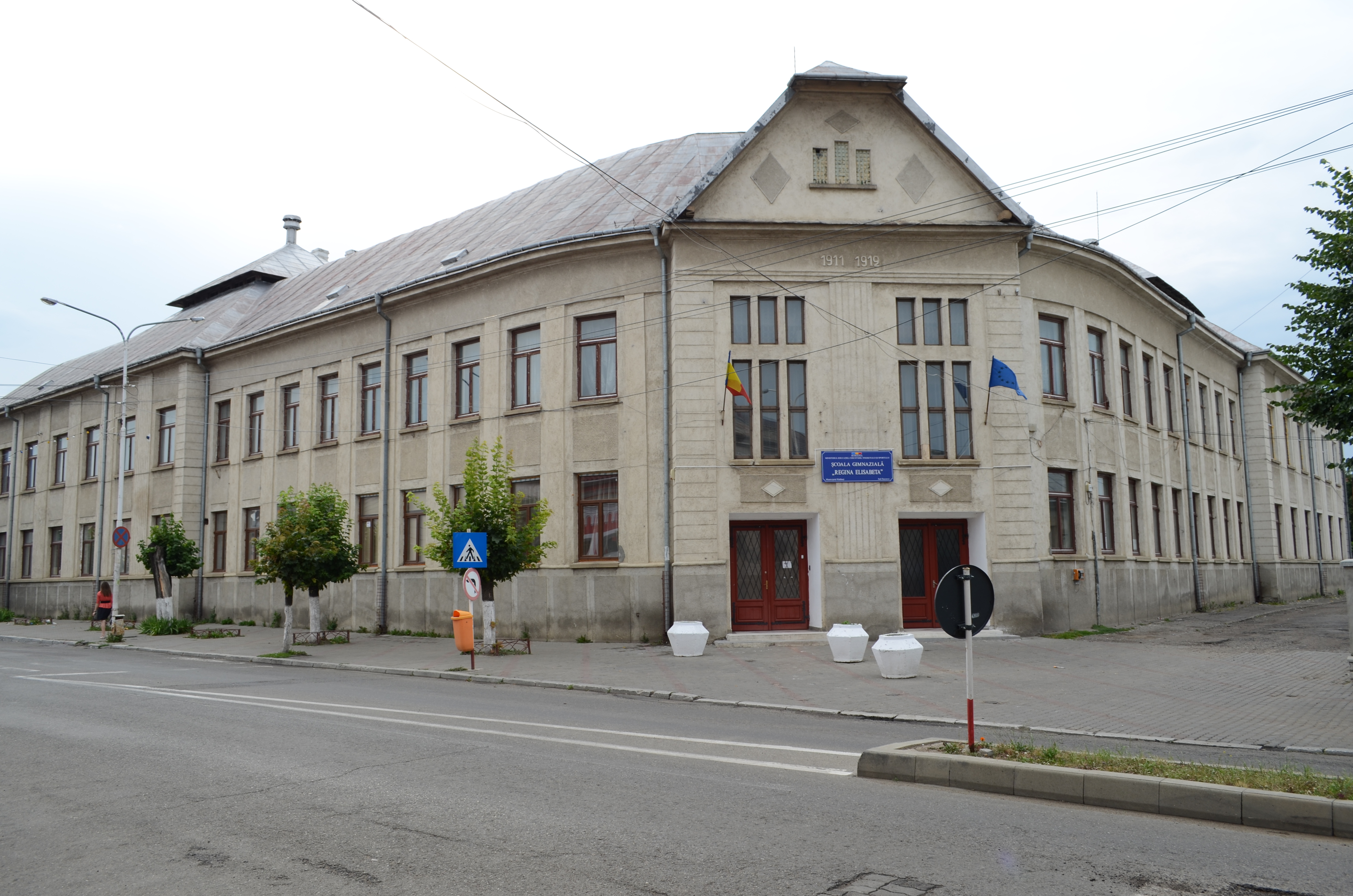
Queen Elizabaeth Elementary School

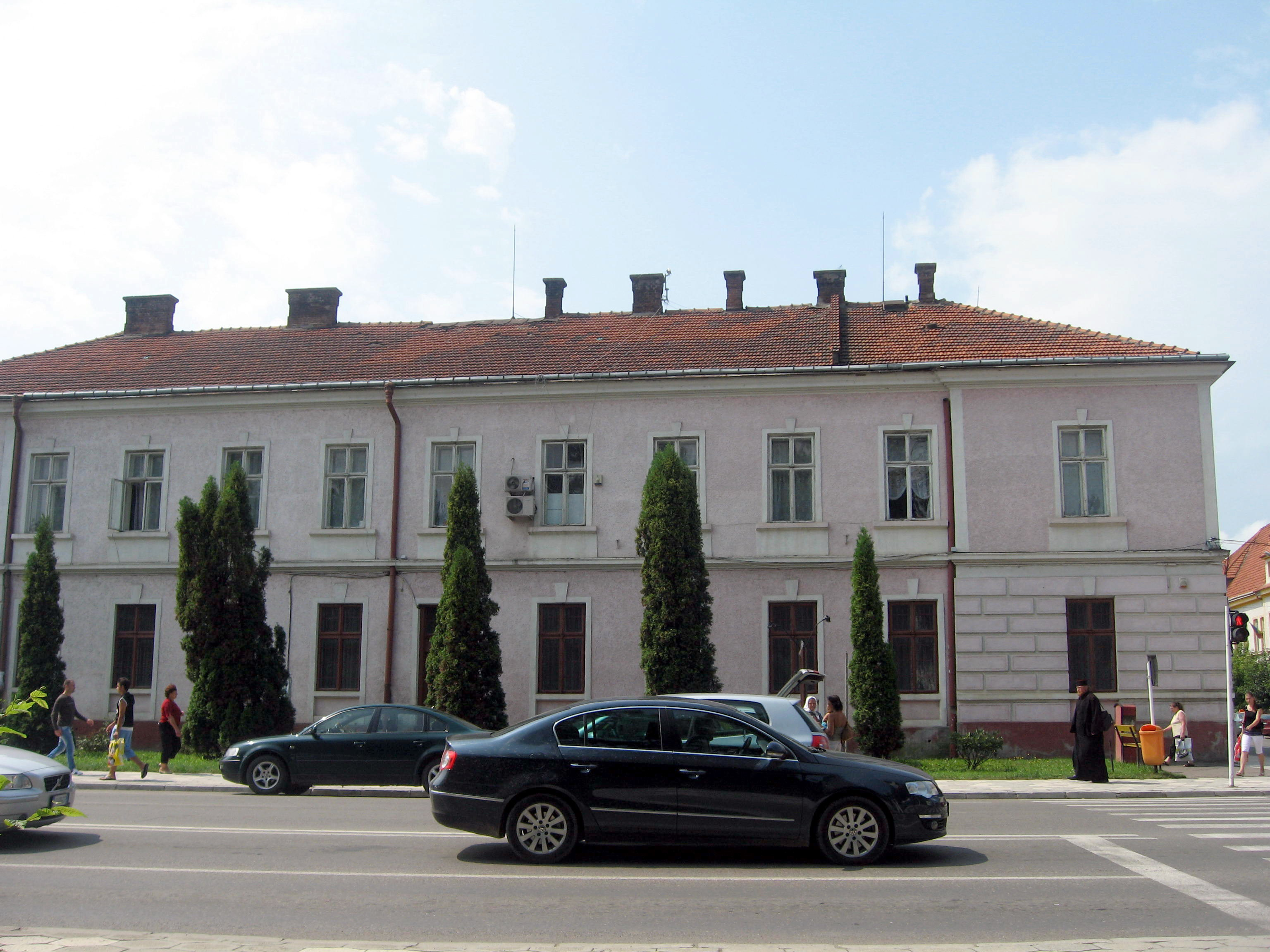
The Ethnographic Museum

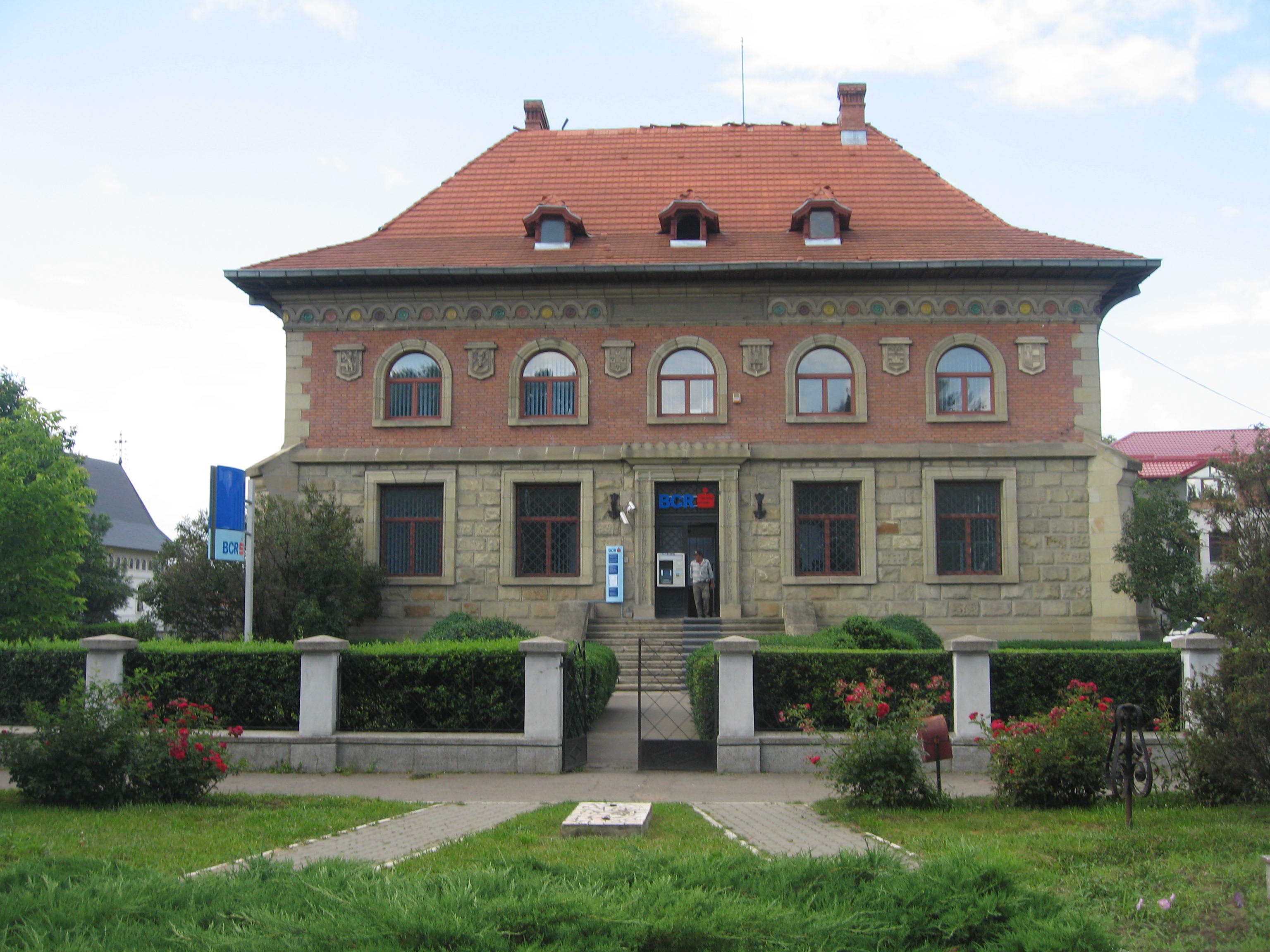
The Romanian Commercial Bank

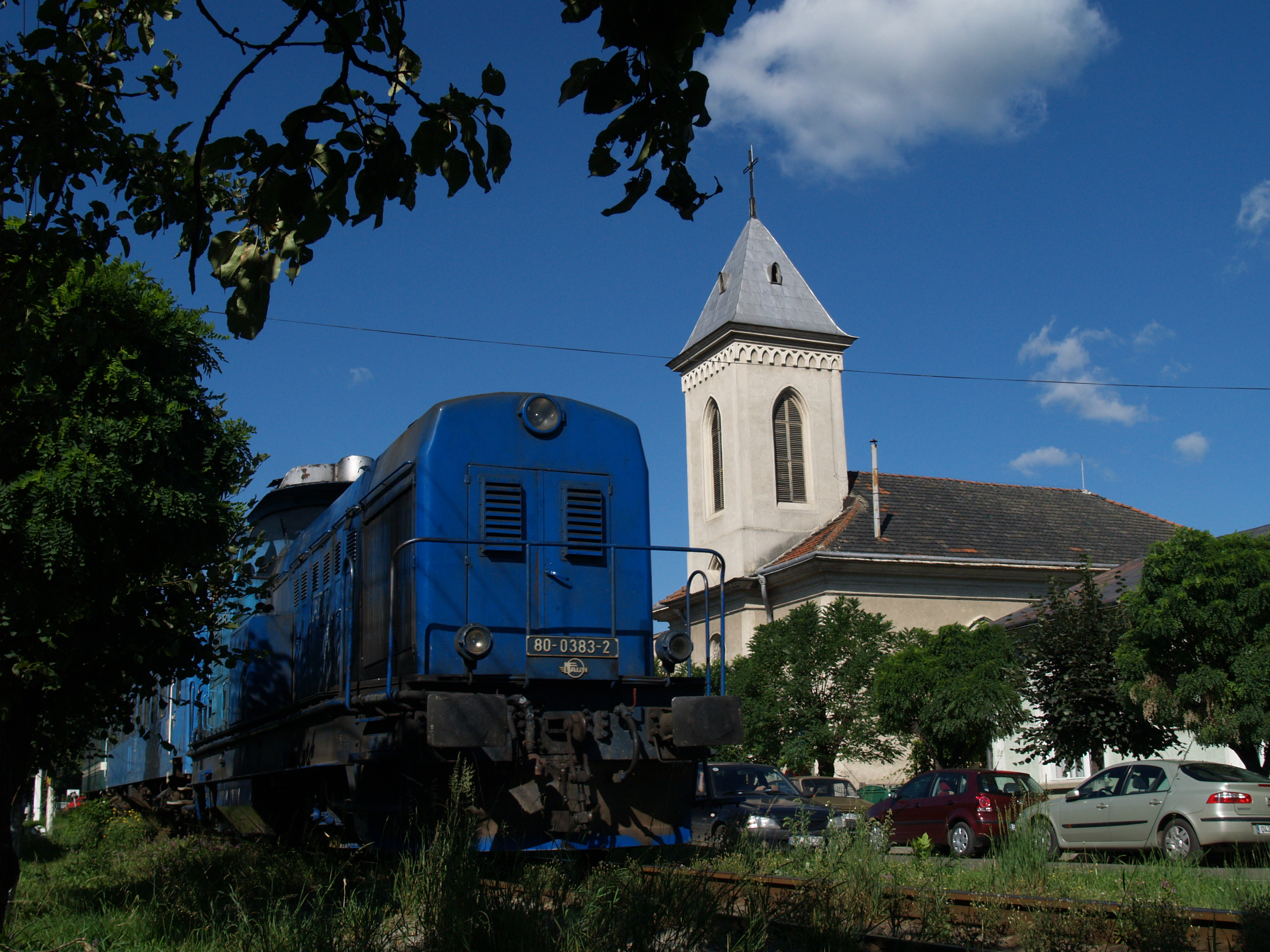
CFR train passing through the town

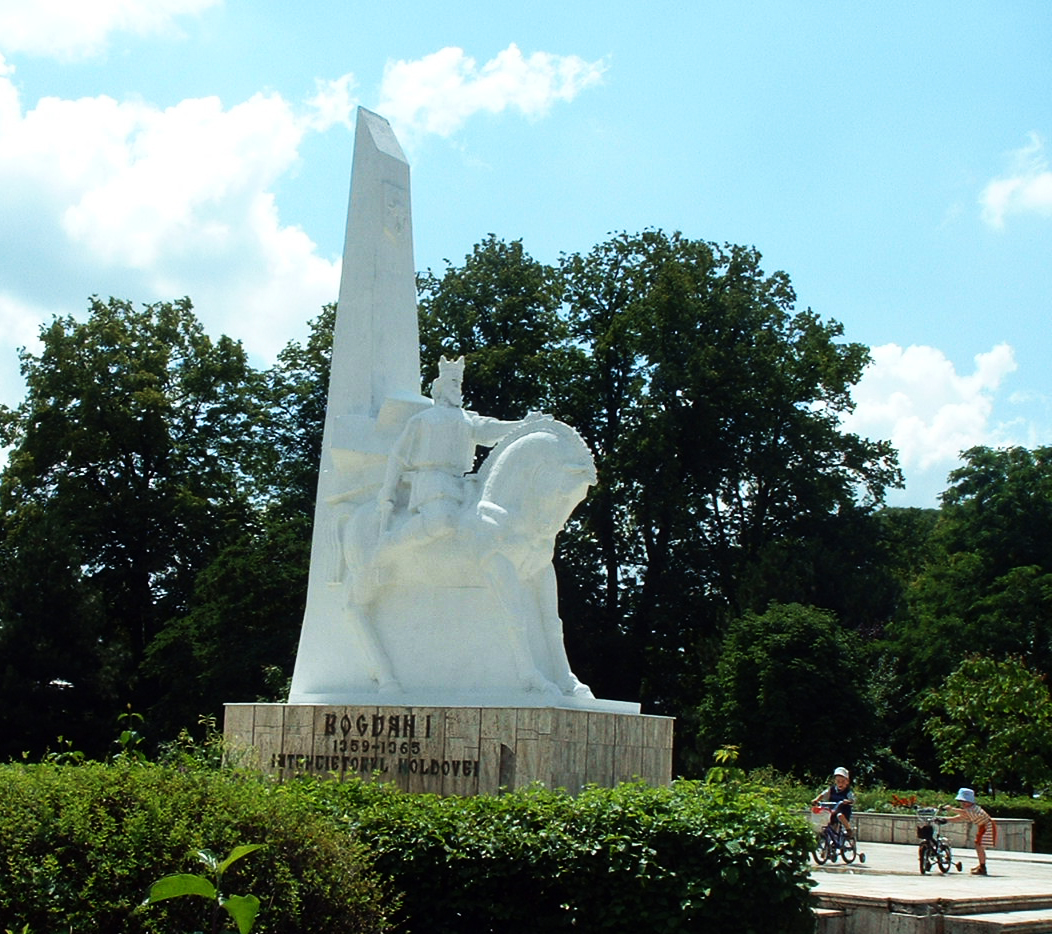
Bogdan I Equestrian Statue, by Marius Butunoiu

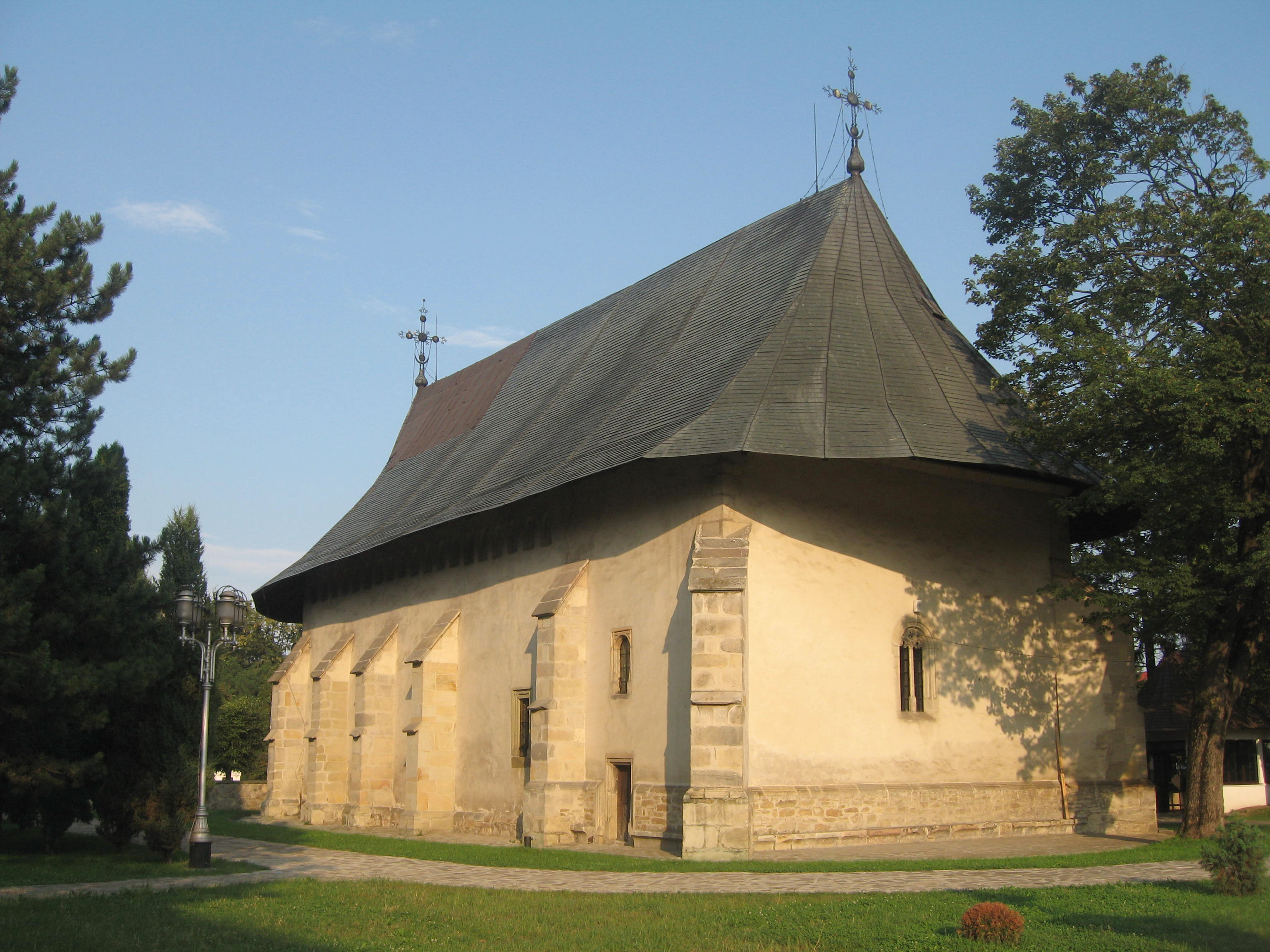
Bogdana Monastery

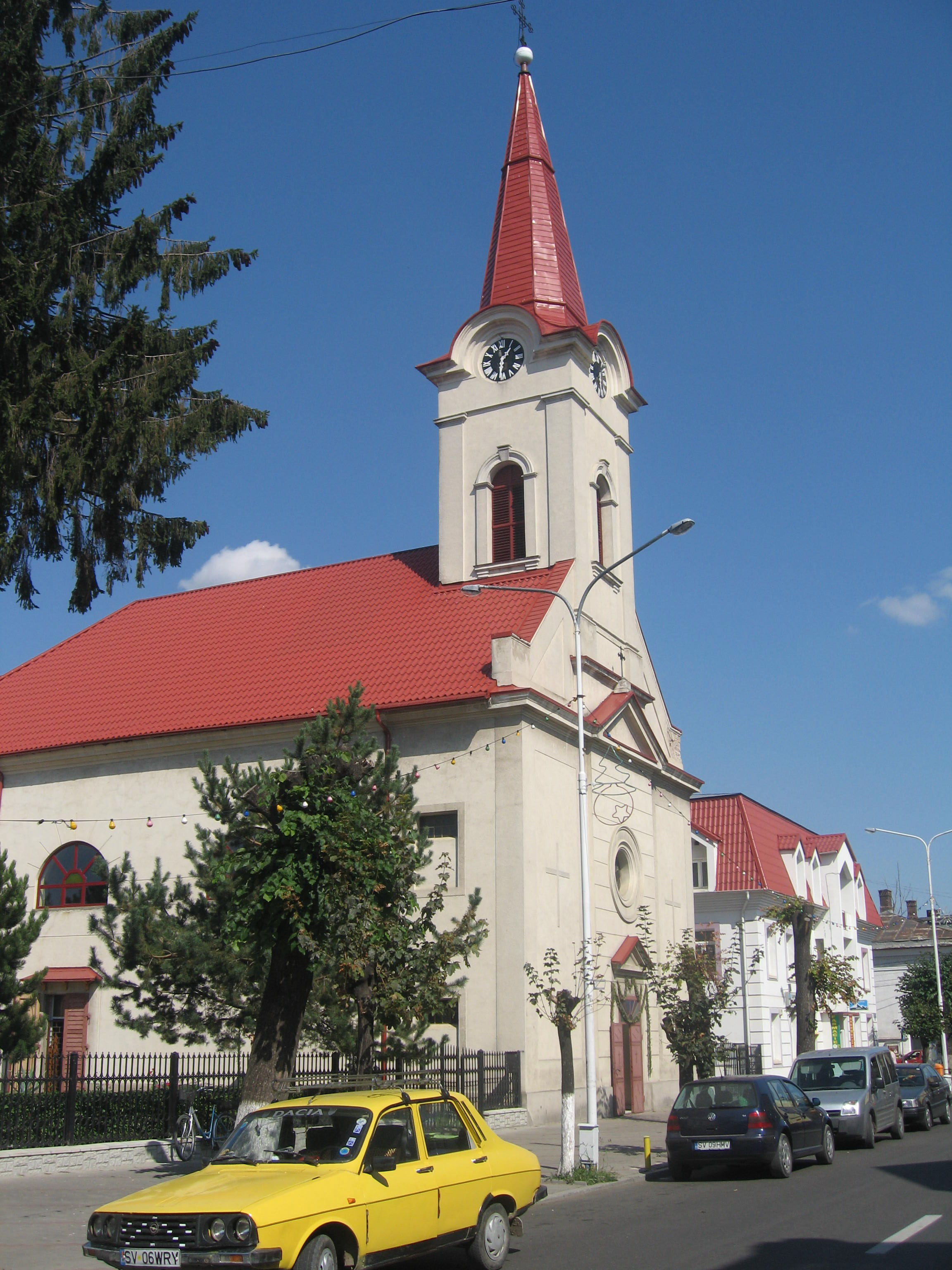
The Roman Catholic Church
