= Sucevița =

- Commune
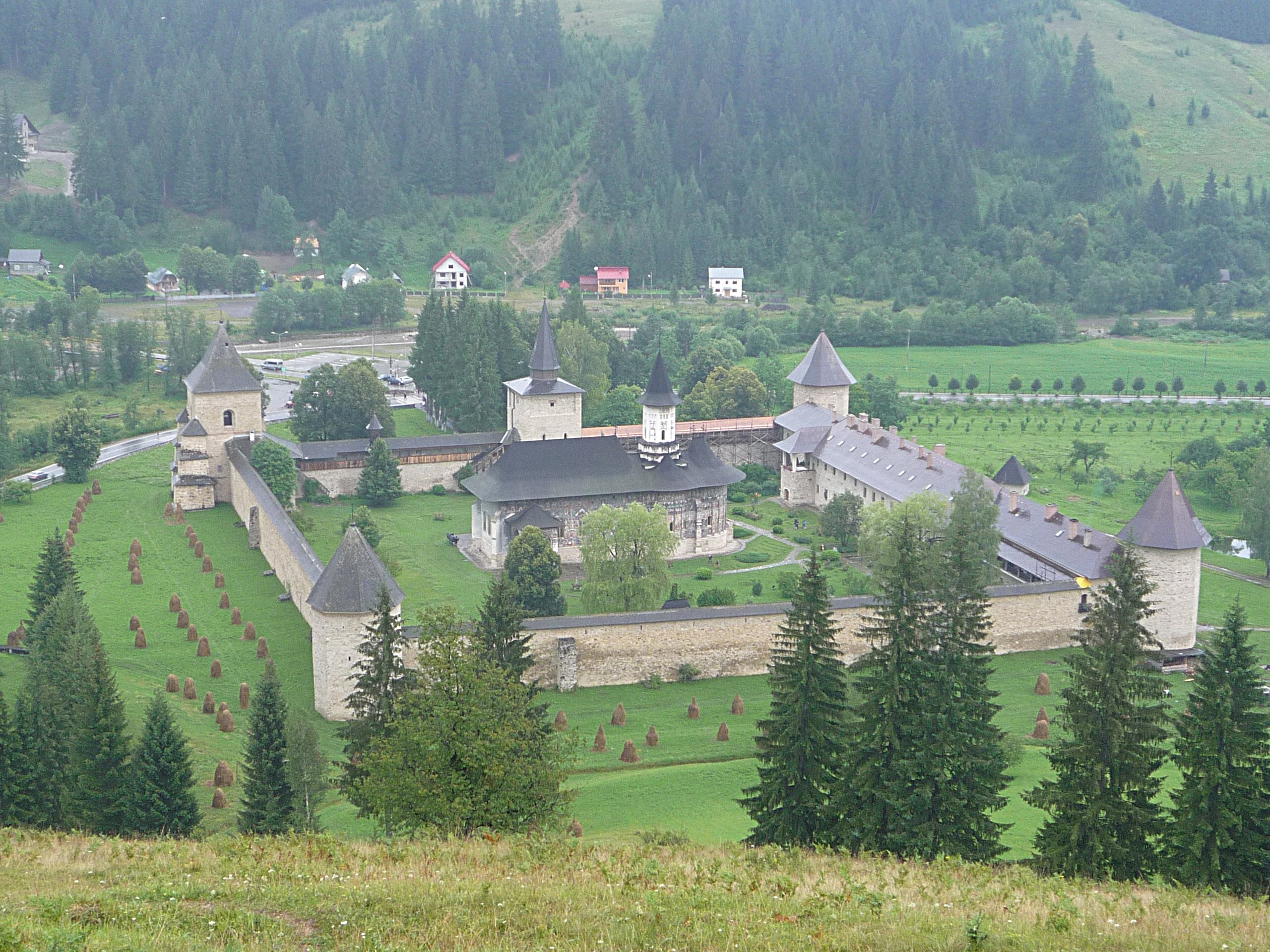
- Sucevița Monastery

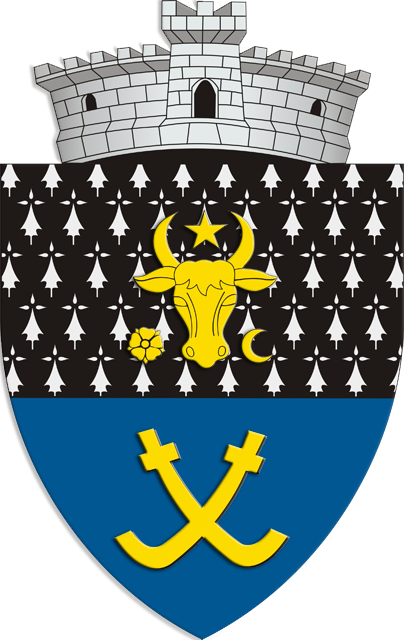
- Coat of arms

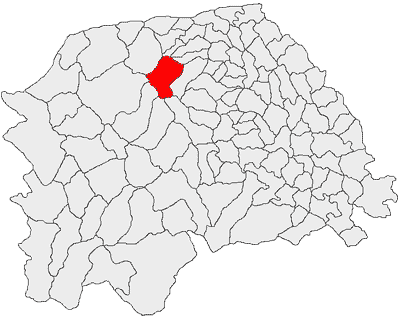
- Location in Suceava County

- Location in Romania
- Coordinates: 47°47′N 25°43′E
- Country: Romania
- County: Suceava
- Subdivisions: Sucevița, Voievodeasa

Government
  - Mayor (2024–2028): Liviu Bodnarescu (PNL)
- Area: 92 km^{2} (36 sq mi)
- Elevation: 545 m (1,788 ft)
- Population (2021-12-01): 2,520
  - Density: 27/km^{2} (71/sq mi)
- Time zone: UTC+02:00 (EET)
  - Summer (DST): UTC+03:00 (EEST)
- Postal code: 727510
- Area code: (+40) x30
- Vehicle reg.: SV
- Website: www.primariasucevita.ro

Sucevița (German: Suczawitza or Kloster Suczawita) is a commune in Suceava County, in the historical region of Bukovina, northeastern Romania. It is composed of two villages, namely Sucevița and Voievodeasa (German: Fürstenthal). Sucevița Monastery, part of the UNESCO World Heritage Site series of the painted Churches of Moldavia, is located in the commune.

Sucevița is also the second town along the Via Transilvanica long-distance trail.

== List of mayors of Sucevița ==
Mayor		Term			Duration	Political party
Portain	Name	Election	Took office	Left office	Duration	Political party
Mayor of Sucevița
	Costan Chiraș	-	1885	1894	9 years, 0 days	Independent
	Gheorghe Boghean	-	1918	1925	7 years, 0 days	Independent
	Grigore Zaremba	-	1926	1927	1 year, 0 days	Independent
	Gheorghe Ițcuș	-	1927	1929	2 years, 0 days	Independent
	Grigore Zaremba	-	1 January 1930	1 June 1933	3 years, 5 days	Independent
	Simion Vatamaniuc	-	25 February 1933	28 December 1937	4 years, 306 days	Independent
	Gavril Roteliuc	-	1936	1936	42 days	Unknown
	Gheorghe Ițcuș	-	1 February 1938	24 October 1940	2 years, 266 days	Independent
	Grigore Zaremba	-	1 December 1941	15 September 1943	1 year, 288 days	Independent
	Filip Chiraș	-	15 September 1943	1 February 1944	139 days	Unknown
	Gheorghe Chiraș	-	1 February 1944	1 April 1945	1 year, 59 days	Unknown
	Ioan Vatamaniuc a Onufrei	-	1 March 1945	31 December 1945	305 days	Unknown
	Iacob Cazac	-	1 January 1946	20 November 1946	304 days	Unknown
	Gheorghe Chiraș	-	20 November 1946	1 September 1949	2 years, 285 days	Unknown
	Simion Vatamaniuc	-	1 February 1941	1 December 1948	7 years, 304 days	Independent
Chairman of the People's Council
	Dimitrie Hrehorciuc	1949	1 July 1949	20 December 1950	1 year, 172 days	PMR
	Dumitru Serafimovici	-	20 December 1950	6 July 1952	1 year, 199 days	PMR
	Vasile Cazac	1955; 1959; 1963	16 March 1955	1 April 1967	12 years, 16 days	PMR/PCR
	Traian Roteliuc	1967	1 April 1967	1 June 1968	1 year, 61 days	PCR
	Emilian Boghean	1968	1 June 1968	31 December 1972	4 years, 213 days	PCR
	Toader Cazacu	1973; 1977	1 January 1973	22 November 1981	8 years, 325 days	PCR
	Constantin Iețcu	1981	1 December 1981	27 December 1983	2 years, 26 days	PCR
	Elena Stroe	-	27 December 1983	1 June 1985	1 year, 156 days	PCR
	Ecaterina Jacotă	1985	1 June 1985	22 December 1989	4 years, 204 days	PCR
Mayor of Sucevița
	Simion Vatamaniuc Jr.	-	22 December 1989	27 July 1992	2 years, 218 days	Unknown
	Stelian Dragoș Cazacu	1992	27 July 1992	22 June 1996	3 years, 331 days	Unknown
	Toader Cazacu	1996; 2000	22 June 1996	2004	8 years, 0 days	Unknown
	Ioan Onufrei	2004; 2008	2004	December 2012	8 years, 162 days	PSD
	Dorin Pînzar	2012; 2016	December 2012	2020	7 years, 305 days	PSD
Acting Mayor of Sucevița
	Gheorghe Hrehorciuc	2020	2020	1 November 2024	4 years, 31 days	PSD
Mayor of Sucevița
	Liviu Bodnărescu	2024	1 November 2024	Incumbent	1 year, 330 days	PNL

== Natives ==
- Józef Weber, Roman Catholic prelate

== Notes ==
- Valerian I. Procopciuc, Sucevița, Cronică în imagini, Suceava, 2015
