= Clit (disambiguation) =

The clit or clitoris is a female sex organ.

Clit or Cliț may also refer to:

- Pointing stick, in computing

== Places in Romania ==
- Clit, a Saca tributary in Suceava County
- Clit, a village in Hășmaș, Arad County
- Cliț, a village in Băbeni, Sălaj
- Clit, a village in Arbore, Suceava County

== See also ==
- All pages beginning with "clit"
