= Solca =

Solca German: Solka Polish: Solka
- Town
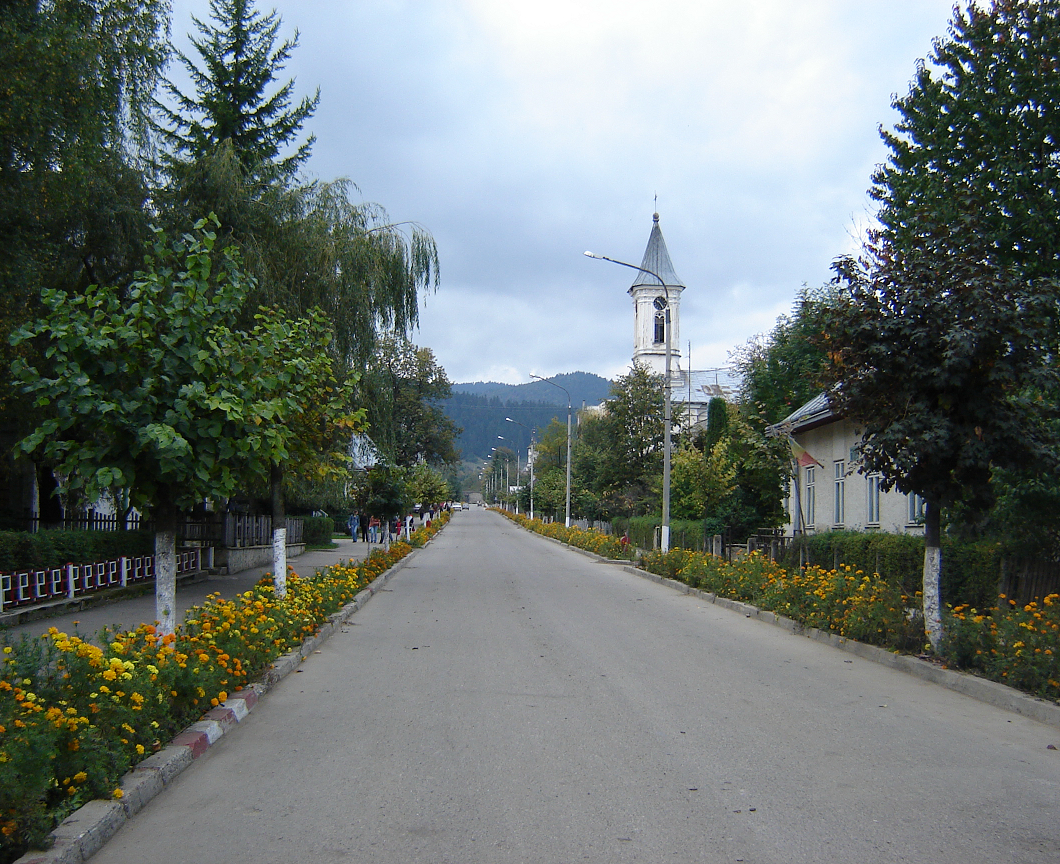
- Tomșa Vodă Street, the town center

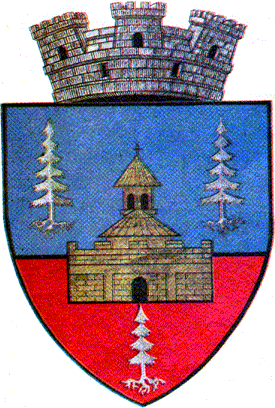
- Coat of arms

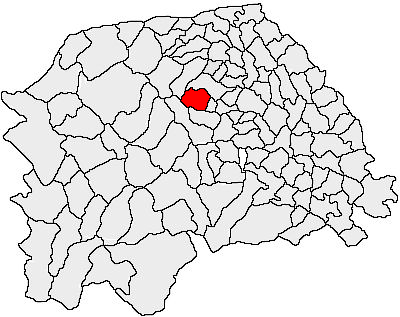
- Location in Suceava County

- Location in Romania
- Coordinates: 47°42′9″N 25°49′54″E
- Country: Romania
- County: Suceava

Government
  - Mayor (2024–2028): Cornel Țehaniuc (PSD)
- Area: 64.63 km^{2} (24.95 sq mi)
- Elevation: 509 m (1,670 ft)
- Population (2021-12-01): 2,405
  - Density: 37.21/km^{2} (96.38/sq mi)
- Time zone: UTC+02:00 (EET)
  - Summer (DST): UTC+03:00 (EEST)
- Vehicle reg.: SV
- Website: www.solca.ro

Solca (German: Solka; Polish: Solka; Hungarian: Szolka) is a town in Suceava County, northeastern Romania. It is situated in the historical regions of Bukovina and Western Moldavia. Solca is the smallest town in the county and the third-smallest town in Romania overall, with a population of 2,405 inhabitants, according to the 2021 census. Its name is derived from that of the river flowing through it, in turn derived from Slavic sol ("salt") – in reference to the area's salty springs. Solca is known for its high quality air, for being a former spa, and for the eponymous beer brand that was manufactured here in its own factory (which was opened in 1810) until 2004 (the brand was subsequently acquired by Bermas and since then the Solca beer is produced in Suceava).

== Geography ==
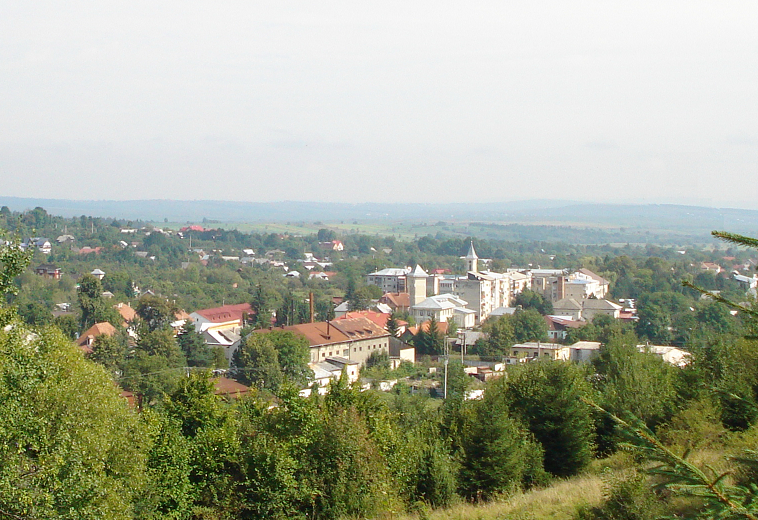
The town of Solca (German: Solka), as seen from the local stadium

Solca is located in the central-eastern part of Suceava County, at the foot of the eastern part of Obcina Mare Mountains, in the Solca-Cacica Depression. The town is situated at the border of the Suceava Plateau and the Eastern Carpathians, at an average altitude of 522 m (1,713 ft). The Solca River crosses the town. Solca is a place known for the beauty of the natural landscape and the high quality of its air.

Solca borders with the following communes: Marginea (in north-west), Arbore (in north and north-east), Poieni-Solca (in south and south-east), Cacica (in south) and Mănăstirea Humorului (in west). The town is situated at a distance of 23 km (14 mi) from the city of Rădăuți, 32 km (20 mi) from the town of Gura Humorului, 48 km (30 mi) from the city of Suceava (the county seat), and 464 km (288 mi) from Bucharest.

The town is celebrated for its monumental Romanian Orthodox church, the former Sts. Peter and Paul's Monastery (1613–1623), also knowns as Solca Monastery, built by Voievod (Ruling Prince) Ștefan Tomșa II of Moldavia and closed by the Habsburgs in 1785, and a beer factory that ranks among the oldest in the country (1810). Salt springs are located in the northern forested area. Solca is also relatively close to the Cacica salt mine and the Arbore church.

In Solca there is a Romanian traditional house which dates from the 17th century. This house was transformed into a museum in 1971. Other points of interest are the motel (known as Hanul Solca), the sanatorium with the summer garden and the central park, Tomșa Vodă High School, the Roman Catholic Church (which dates from 1868) and Pietrele Muierilor (a monument of nature located near the town).

Despite the fact it has the status of a town, Solca has a rural aspect in many areas. During the Communist regime, around 10 apartment blocks were built along the two main roads that cross the town: Tomșa Vodă Street and Republicii Street. Solca isn't connected to the Romanian national railway system.

The town administered the village of Poieni-Solca. Following a local referendum held in August 2004, Poieni-Solca split from the town of Solca in March 2007 and became a commune.

== History ==
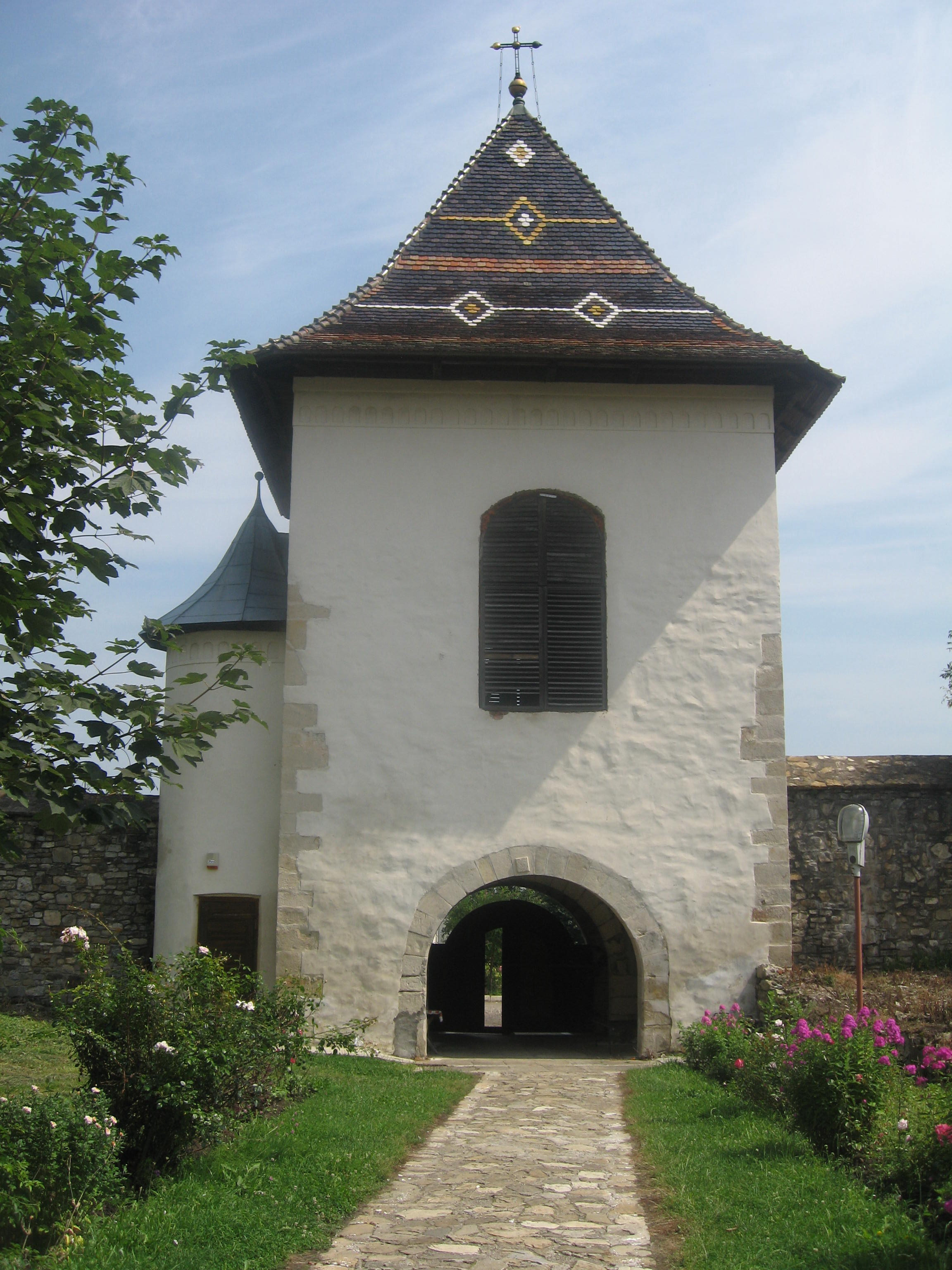
Tower of the local Orthodox church in Solca

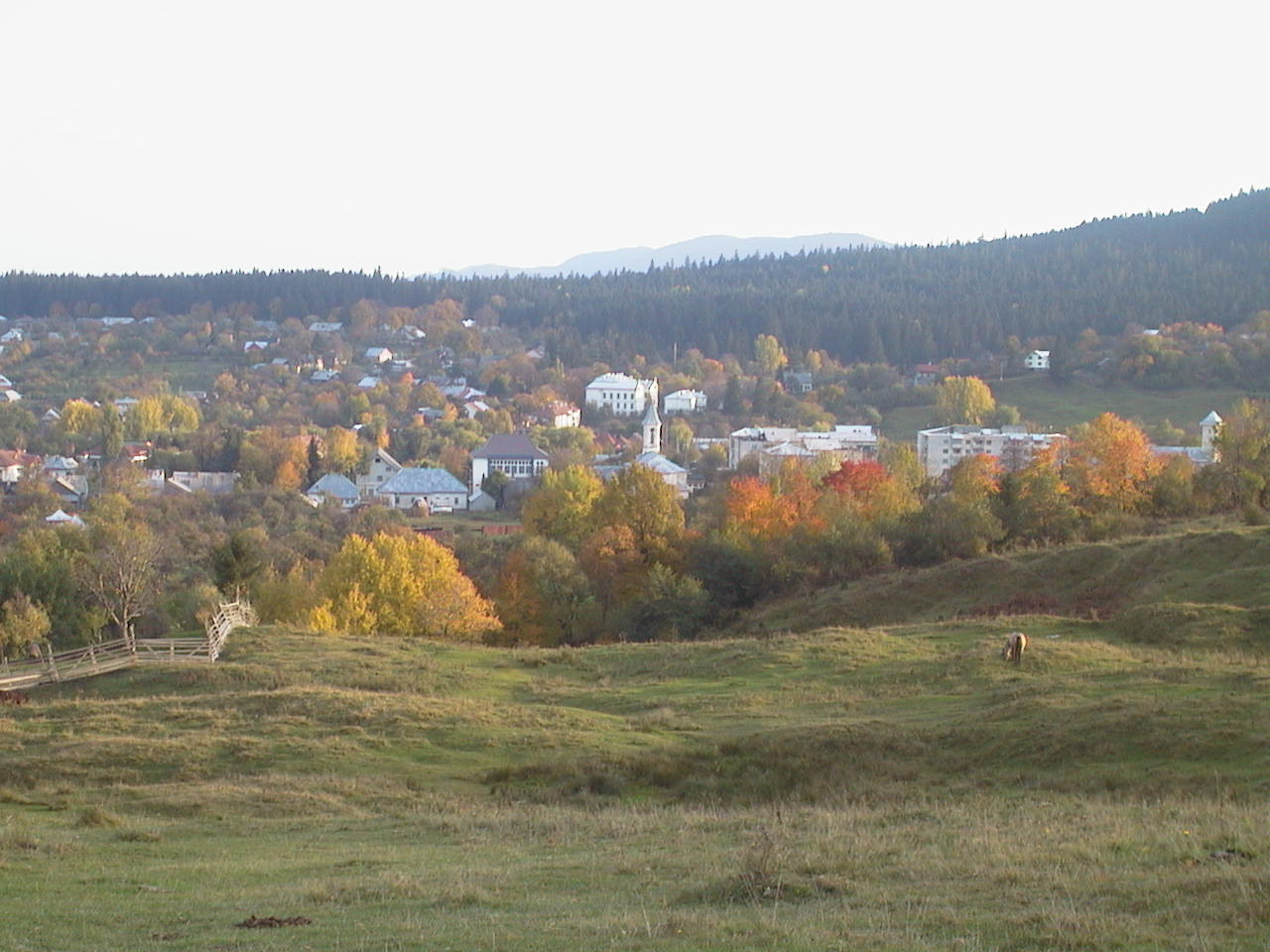
View of the town, from the northern hill

The settlement of Solca was first mentioned in a document issued by Moldavian Prince Alexandru cel Bun on January 15, 1418. On March 7, 1502, the boyar Luca Arbore bought the village from the grandchildren of Cârstea Horaeț and Șandru Gherman. Subsequently, Metropolitan Gheorghe Movilă offers this village to the Sucevița Monastery.

At the beginning of the 17th century, the village is bought by the Moldavian Prince Ștefan Tomșa II (1611–1615, 1621–1623) and he builds here a monastery (known as Sts. Peter and Paul's Monastery or Solca Monastery). In the following centuries, Solca becomes a market town for the surrounding area.

In 1775, together with the rest of Bukovina, Solca becomes part of the Habsburg monarchy, and is eventually part of Austria-Hungary. During this period, many Germans (which later became collectively known as Bukovina Germans), Polish, and Jewish families settled here. Subsequently, Solca becomes a well known summer resort, its renowned fresh air helping the settlement to develop during the following century. In 1810, one of the oldest beer factories in Romania opens in Solca. This brand of beer becomes the main symbol of the settlement.

At the initiative of doctors Eduard Beilich (1845) and Hermann Poras (1876) a sanatorium for lung diseases is opened, with an additional summer garden, so the tourism industry increases and the settlement becomes a well known spa of the Austro-Hungarian Empire.

During World War I, Solca is the scene of Eastern Front battles between the armies of Austria-Hungary and the Russian Empire. After 1918, Solca (along with the rest of Bukovina) become part of the Kingdom of Romania. It remains a well sought resort, especially for those with lung diseases. Solca was officially declared a town in 1926.

After the Romanian Revolution of 1989, Solca descended into a period of regression. The sanatorium was turned into a chronic diseases hospital and eventually, in 2011, in an asylum for the elderly. The beer factory and the summer garden are closed down, the high school goes through a decrease in prestige. Today, Solca is no longer a resort, and the main occupation of its inhabitants is agriculture.

== Demographics ==
Historical population
Year	Pop.	±%
1930	2,822	—
1948	2,212	−21.6%
1956	2,384	+7.8%
1966	2,550	+7.0%
1977	4,541	+78.1%
1992	4,762	+4.9%
2002	4,687	−1.6%
2011	2,188	−53.3%
2021	2,405	+9.9%
Source: Census data

According to the 2021 census data, 2,405 inhabitants live in Solca. At the 2011 census data, there were 2,188 inhabitants, a decrease from the figure recorded at the 2002 census, when the town had a population of 4,456 inhabitants. The main cause of the drastic population decline from 2002 to 2011 was that Poieni-Solca, the village administered by Solca, was split from the town in March 2007 and became a commune.

Solca is the smallest town in Suceava County and the third smallest town in Romania. Only Băile Tușnad and Nucet are smaller than Solca.

== Administration and local politics ==
=== Town council ===
==== 2024–present ====
The town's current local council for the period 2024–2028 has the following multi-party political composition, based on the results of the votes cast at the 2024 Romanian local elections:

Party	Seats	Current Council
Social Democratic Party (PSD)	7	
National Liberal Party (PNL)	2	
Save Romania Union (USR)	1	
Social Liberal Humanist Party (PUSL)	1	

== Natives ==
- Ilie E. Torouțiu (1888–1953), literary historian, academician
