= Clit, Suceava =

Village in Bukovina, Romania

Clit Glitt
- Village
- Location within Romania
- Coordinates: 47°45′27″N 25°50′59″E
- Country: Romania
- Region: Bukovina
- County: Suceava
- Commune: Arbore
- Elevation: 468 m (1,535 ft)

Population (2021)
  - Total: 1,221
- Time zone: UTC+2 (EET)
  - Summer (DST): UTC+3 (EEST)
- Postal Code: 727017
- SIRUTA Code: 146897

Clit (German: Glitt) is a village in Arbore, Suceava, Bukovina, Romania. The village's name originates from the Ukrainian word clitca, meaning stack or pile, because fugitives from Galicia called their houses that.

== History ==
Before Bukovina was annexed to the Austro-Hungarian Empire in 1775, there was a settlement made up of several families located around 3 kilometres (1.9 mi) west of Solca near the Slatina forest. Most of the people in this settlement were Orthodox Romanians from Transylvania, fleeing religious persecution by Roman Catholics.

The permanent settlement of Clit began in the 19th century, when Austria brought in German colonists who settled on a nearby hill named Dealul Iederii or Dealu Ederii in 1835. They named their settlement Lichtenberg. The people from Slatina then moved to more favorable areas near the German colonists.

In a 1907 report by Austria-Hungary, the total population of Clit, then located in Gurahumora, was given as 1,216, 610 male and 606 female. 598 spoke German, 497 spoke Ruthenian, 116 spoke Romanian, and 4 spoke some other language.

== Surroundings ==
The village is surrounded by natural features, such as the plateau and Secului Hill, located opposite the Havriș and Slatina forests. On Secului Hill, there is another forest called Bahna, which the locals take pride in because loggers have not yet managed to discover it. Clit is also crossed by three rivers: Iaslovăț, Saca, and Clit, which eventually flow into the Suceava river.

== Demographics ==
According to the 2002 Romanian census, the village had a population of 1,325. 1,115 were Romanian, 142 were Ukrainian, 55 were Roma, and 12 were German. 1,167 spoke Romanian, 136 spoke Ukrainian, 11 spoke Romani, and 11 spoke German.
