= Solca (river) =

- Location within Romania

Location
- Country: Romania
- Counties: Suceava County
- Villages: Solca, Arbore

Physical characteristics
- Mouth: Suceava
  - location: Gura Solcii
  - coordinates: 47.7470°N 26.0537°E
- Length: 34 km (21 mi)
- Basin size: 165 km^{2} (64 sq mi)

Basin features
- Progression: Suceava→ Siret→ Danube→ Black Sea
- Tributaries
  - left: Ardeluța, Saca, Iaslovăț
  - right: Crevec

The Solca (in its upper course also: Solcuța) is a right tributary of the river Suceava in Romania. It discharges into the Suceava in Gura Solcii. Its length is 34 km (21 mi) and its basin size is 165 km^{2} (64 sq mi).
