= Bukovina Society Headquarters and Museum =

Museum in Ellis, Kansas

- Established: 1988
- Location: Ellis, Kansas, United States
- Coordinates: 38.9405°N 99.5605°W

The Bukovina Society Headquarters and Museum is a museum of artifacts from Bukovina German immigrants. The museum is operated by the Bukovina Society of the Americas and is located at the former First Congregational Church building in Ellis, Kansas, United States. The museum was established in 1992 by the Bukovina-German immigrant community, which settled in Ellis in 1886.
