= Bukovina Germans =

German ethnic group

German: Bukowinadeutsche or Buchelanddeutsche

- Top: Flag of the Bukovina Germans, with the historical coat of arms of Bukovina depicted in the center. (Note: These coat of arms were also used in the Austrian Parliament to represent Bukovina and all its inhabitants during the Austro-Hungarian monarchy.) Bottom: The coat of arms of the Bukovina Germans (Note: Which is the exact coat of arms of the entire region of Bukovina, depicting the ox and the three stars.)

Total population
- 475 (2022)

Regions with significant populations
- Bukovina (more specifically in present-day Suceava County, northeastern Romania) Diaspora in: Canada; United States; Germany; Austria

Languages
- German (Standard German, historically Bukovina German) (with a series of German dialects as well)

Religion
- Primarily Roman Catholic but also Lutheran

Related ethnic groups
- Germans, Germans of Romania, Carpathian Germans, and Austrians
- Lived in Bukovina between the late 18th century and mid 20th century (and, in very smaller numbers, to the present day as well)

The Bukovina Germans, (Note: German: Bukowinadeutsche or Buchenlanddeutsche, Romanian: Germani bucovineni or nemți bucovineni, Ukrainian: Буковинські німці.) also known and referred to as Buchenland Germans, or Bukovinian Germans, are a German ethnic group which settled in Bukovina, a historical region situated at the crossroads of Central and Eastern Europe, during the modern period. They are part of the larger group of Romanian Germans, since the early 20th century, when they were initially living in the Kingdom of Romania.

Their main demographic presence lasted from the last quarter of the 18th century, when Bukovina was annexed by the Habsburg Empire, until 1940, when nearly all Bukovina Germans (or approximately 100,000 people) were forcefully resettled into either Nazi Germany or Nazi-occupied regions in Central-Eastern Europe as a part of the Heim ins Reich national socialist population transfer policy.

Nowadays, most of the Bukovina Germans still left in Bukovina live in the bigger urban settlements of Suceava (Polish: Suczawa) and Rădăuți (German: Radautz) in Suceava County (German: Kreis Suczawa) as well as sparsely throughout other rural settlements in the center and southwest of the county. Otherwise, a significant Bukovina German diaspora can be found in Germany and Austria as well as in North America (more specifically in the United States and Canada) and South America (for example, in Argentina). In addition, the smaller community of Zipser Germans (German: Zipser Deutsche) still living in Suceava County, southern Bukovina, Romania, can be perceived as part of the Bukovina German community as well, in the greater sense that is.

== Historical overview ==
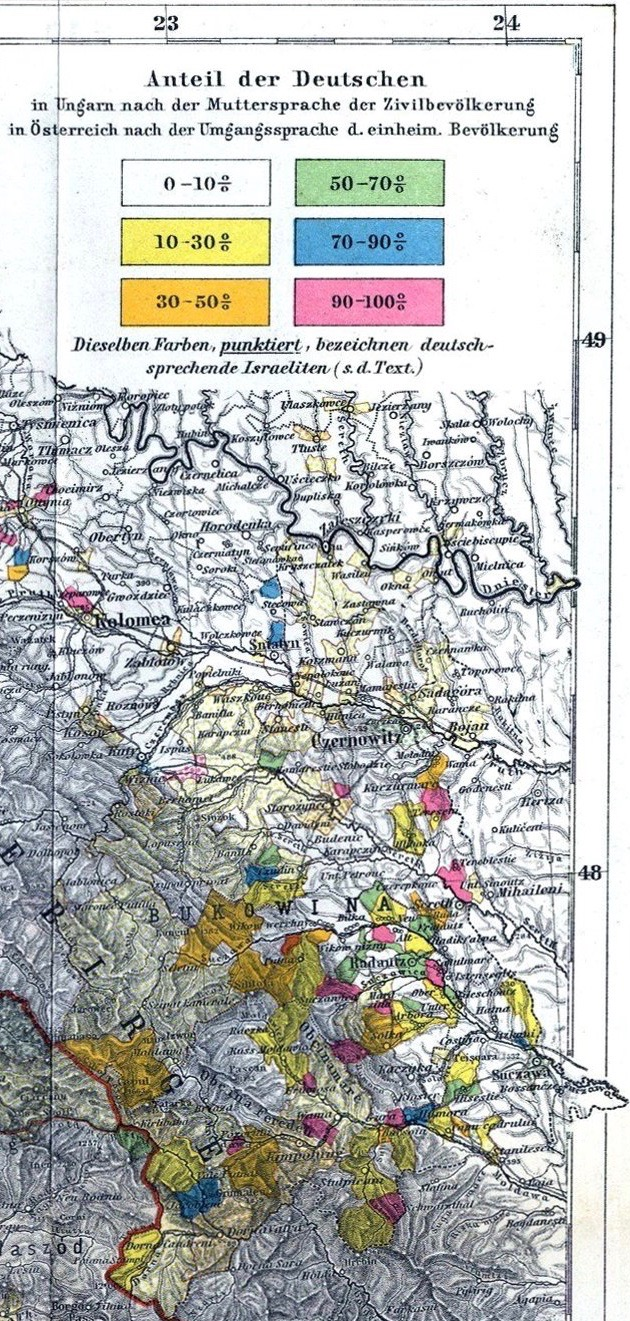
German-language map depicting the settlement areas of the Bukovina Germans in the Duchy of Bukovina, Cisleithania, Austria-Hungary in 1890.

According to the 1910 Imperial Austrian census (which recorded inhabitants according to language), the Bukovina Germans represented an ethnic minority accounting for approximately 21.2% of the multi-ethnic population of the Duchy of Bukovina (German: Herzogtum Bukowina). Of those 21.2%, a large proportion was represented by German-speaking Jews. Excluding the Jews from this figure, however, the Germans in Bukovina constituted a minority of approximately 73,000 people (or 9.2%).

Subsequently, in absolute numbers, 75,533 ethnic Germans (or about 9% of the population) were registered in Bukovina when it was still part of the Kingdom of Romania (as per the Romanian population census of 1930). Historically, some of them developed their own dialect over the course of several hundred years which they called Buchenländisch, while others speak a series of other distinct German dialects, depending on their region of origin.

After the end of World War II, several thousand ethnic Germans still remained in southern Bukovina (according to an estimate c. 7,500), but many of them emigrated to West Germany before the fall of communism in Romania in 1989. In addition, few resettled Germans returned as well.

To this day, sparse and very small rural and urban communities of Germans (a few dozen to hundred persons) still reside in southern Bukovina (i.e., Suceava County situated in northeastern Romania) and are politically represented by the Democratic Forum of Germans in Romania (FDGR/DFDR).

Lastly, another important aspect on the German presence in Bukovina is the fact that the historical/geographic region as a whole has been previously sometimes labeled as 'Switzerland of the East'. In one particular interpretation, it can be mentioned that the Zipser Germans (German: Zipser Deutsche or Zipser Sachsen) in the southwest of Suceava County can also be included within the overall Bukovina German community still remaining and living in the county.

== History ==
=== Initial settlement during the Middle Ages (13th century to 14th century) ===
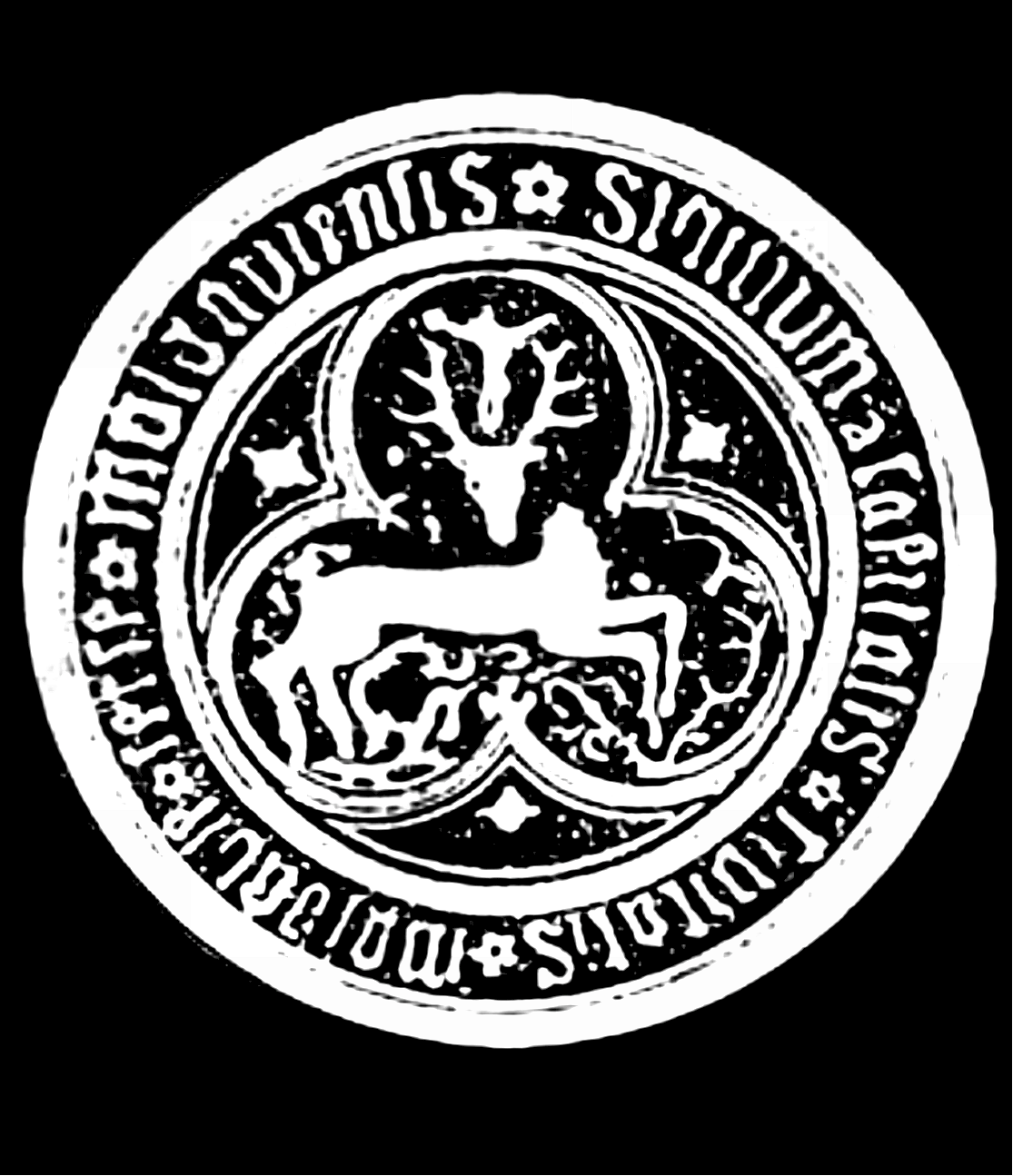
14th century seal of Baia, evoking the legend of Saint Hubertus, the patron saint of hunters.

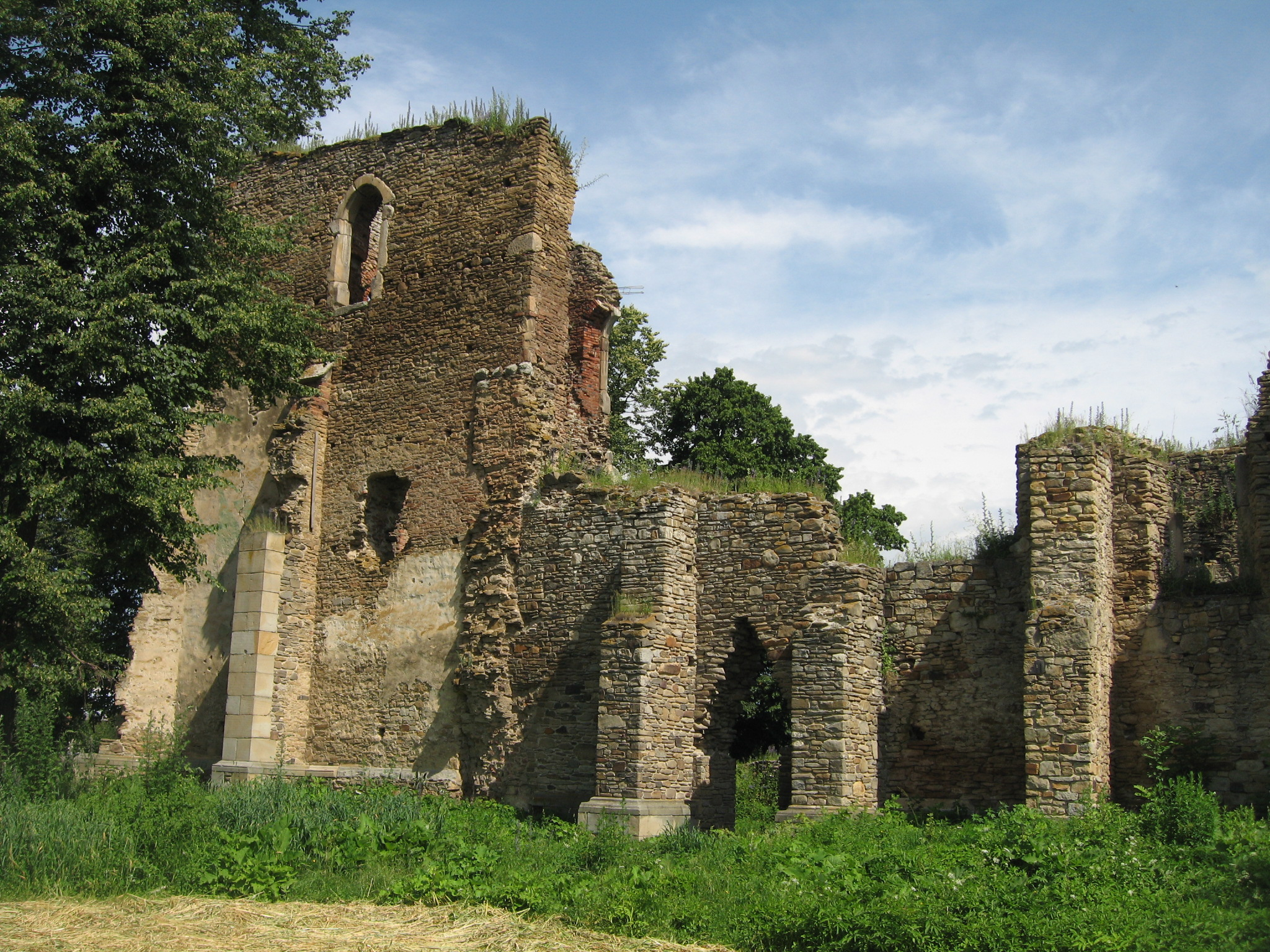
Ruins of the medieval Roman Catholic cathedral situated in Baia (German: Stadt Molde or Moldenmarkt), Suceava County, northeastern Romania.

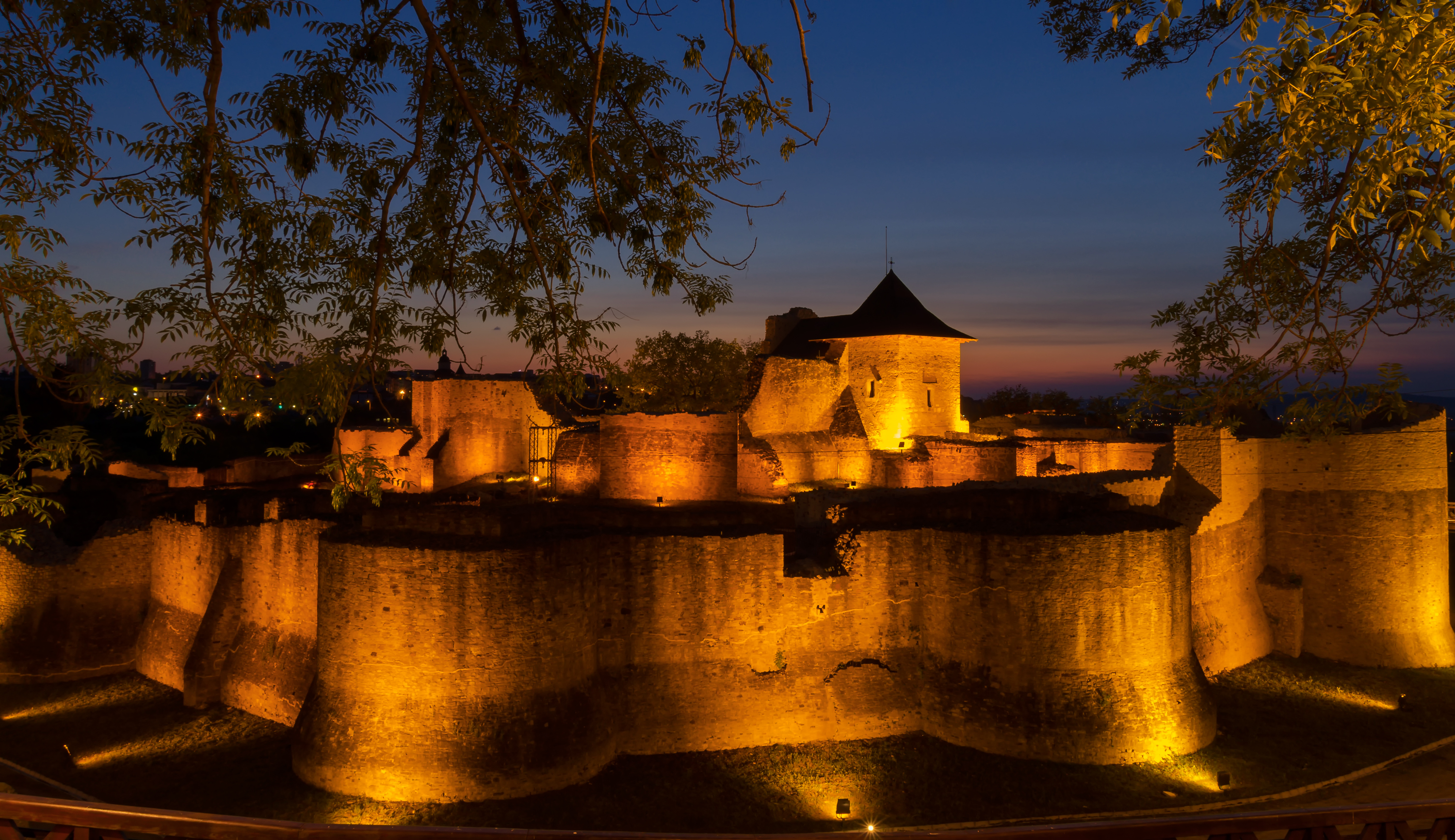
A small, compact community of Transylvanian Saxons (German: Siebenbürger Sachsen) previously lived in the town of Suceava during the Middle Ages.

Ethnic Germans known as Transylvanian Saxons (who were mainly craftsmen and merchants stemming from present-day Luxembourg and Rhine-Moselle river area of Western Europe), had sparsely settled in the western mountainous regions of the Principality of Moldavia over the course of the late medieval Ostsiedlung process (which, in this particular case, took place throughout the 13th and 14th centuries).

These settlers encouraged trade and urban development. Additionally, they founded, and were also briefly in charge under the title of Schultheiß (Romanian: Șoltuz), of some notable medieval settlements such as Baia (German: Baja, Stadt Molde, or Moldenmarkt), the first capital of the Principality of Moldavia, or Târgu Neamț (German: Niamtz).

It is also possible that the German community in Baia could have stemmed from Galicia (Romanian: Galiția; a historical region nowadays situated between southeastern Poland and western Ukraine), being thus represented by a group of medieval Walddeutsche.

In the medieval town of Suceava (German: Suczawa), one of the former capitals of the Principality of Moldavia, the Magdeburg law held sway for a certain period of time. The very same German law is also known to have been applied in Câmpulung Moldovenesc (German: Kimpolung), Siret (German: Sereth), Baia, and Târgu Neamț. So it is that on the current territorial extent of Suceava County, a small but influent community of Transylvanian Saxons lived during medieval times, their main occupations being trade and craftsmanship.

As it was the case of other medieval towns in which the Magdeburg law held sway, this particular German town law came hand in hand with the medieval municipal law (discernible with the foundation of Freiburg im Breisgau in the early 12th century) and the Sachsenspiegel (an important law book during the time of the Holy Roman Empire). The town of Suceava is referred to as Sotschen (an Old High German name) in one of the works of Abraham Ortelius on European geography for the 15th and 16th centuries.

Aside from the local Transylvanian Saxon community which most likely stemmed from Bistrița area (German: Bistritz or Nösen, archaic form of the name of the town), the Teutonic Knights were also present in the region during the High Middle Ages, most notably in Siret, where they managed to build a local stronghold situated near a hill in the proximity of the then medieval town during the early 13th century. Subsequently however, most of the local Germans had been gradually assimilated in these local cultures by the dominant ethnic group of Romanians, and, to a lesser extent, Csángós.

=== Under the Habsburgs and within the Austrian Empire (1774–1918) ===
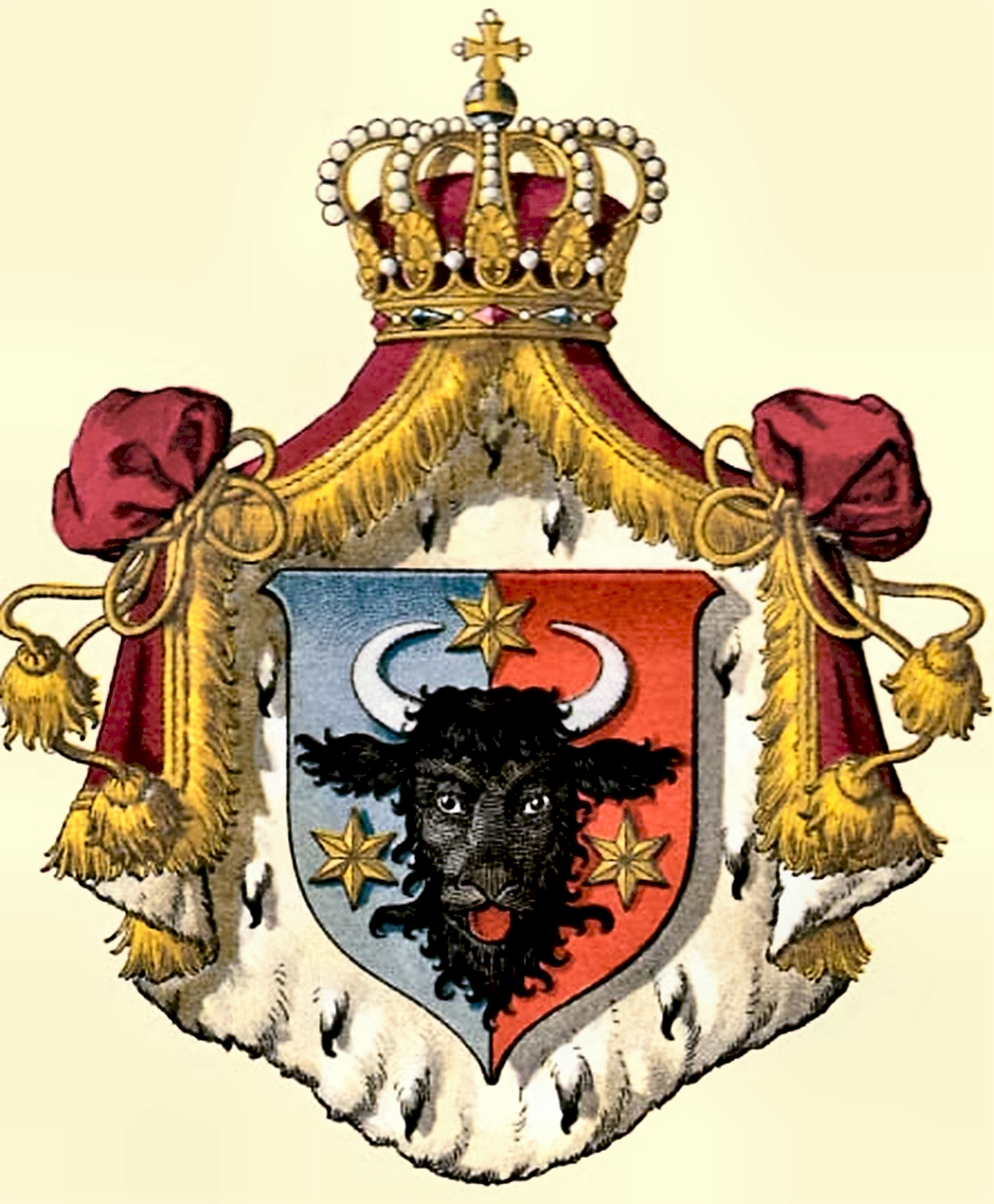
The coat of arms of the Duchy of Bukovina conceived by Austrian heraldist Hugo Gerard Ströhl.

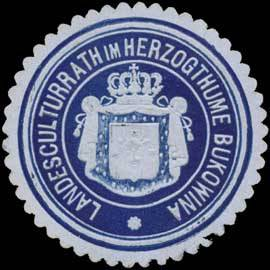
Sealing stamp inscribed in an older form of Austrian Standard German from the Duchy of Bukovina (German: Herzogtum Bukowina), more specifically from Cernăuți (German: Czernowitz).

Following the Russo-Turkish War, in 1774–75, as per the Treaty of Küçük Kaynarca, the Habsburg monarchy annexed northwestern Moldavia (or the highlands of the Principality of Moldavia) which was predominantly inhabited by Romanians (as many as 85 percent), with smaller numbers of Ukrainians (including Hutsuls and Ruthenians), Armenians, Poles, and Jews.

Since then, the region has been known as Bukovina (German: Bukowina or Buchenland). From 1774 to 1786, the settlement of German craftsmen and farmers in existing villages increased. The settlers included Zipser Germans (German: Zipser Sachsen) from the Zips region of Upper Hungary (today mostly Slovakia but also Lesser Poland Voivodeship in Poland), Banat Swabians from Banat, and ethnic Germans from Galicia (more specifically Evangelical Lutheran Protestants), but also immigrants from the Rhenish Palatinate, the Baden and Hesse principalities, as well as from impoverished regions of the Bohemian Forest (German: Böhmerwald).

Over the passing of time, these German-speaking settlers who stemmed from various regions of Central Europe became collectively known as Bukovina Germans and formed an important, middle- to upper class ethnic group in the region. While they collectively formed a new community of this former Austrian-annexed territory, the Bukovina Germans had various regional identities, according to their initial place of origin (e.g. clear through the spoken dialect).

Thus, four distinct German linguistic groups were represented across Bukovina as follows:

- Austrian High German (Österreichisches Hochdeutsch) was spoken in urban centres like Cernăuți (Czernowitz), Rădăuți (Radautz), Suceava (Suczawa), Gura Humorului (Gura Humora), Câmpulung (Kimpolung), and Siret (Sereth);
- Bohemian-Bavarian German (Deutschböhmisch or Böhmerwäldisch) was spoken by woodsmen in Huta Veche (Althütte), Crăsnișoara Nouă (Neuhütte), Gura Putnei (Karlsberg), Voievodeasa (Fürstenthal), Vadu Negrilesei (Schwarzthal), Poiana Micului (Buchenhain), Dealu Ederii (Lichtenberg), Bori (early colony in Gura Humorului), and Clit (Glitt);
- Palatine Rhine Franconian (Pfälzisch) and Swabian German (Schwäbisch) was spoken in farming villages like Arbore (Arbora), Bădeuți (Deutsch Badeutz), Frătăuții Vechi (Alt Fratautz), Frătăuții Noi (Neu Fratautz), Ilișești (Illischestie), Ițcani (Itzkany), Satu Mare (Deutsch Satulmare) and Tereblecea (Tereblestie);
- Zipser German (Zipserisch) was spoken by mine workers and their descendants in Cârlibaba (Kirlibaba, Mariensee or Ludwigsdorf), Iacobeni (Jakobeny), Stulpicani (Stulpikany), and elsewhere.

During the 19th century, the developing German middle class comprised much of the intellectual and political elite of the region; the language of official business and education was predominantly German, particularly among the upper classes. Population growth and a shortage of land led to the establishment of daughter settlements in Galicia, Bessarabia, and Dobruja.

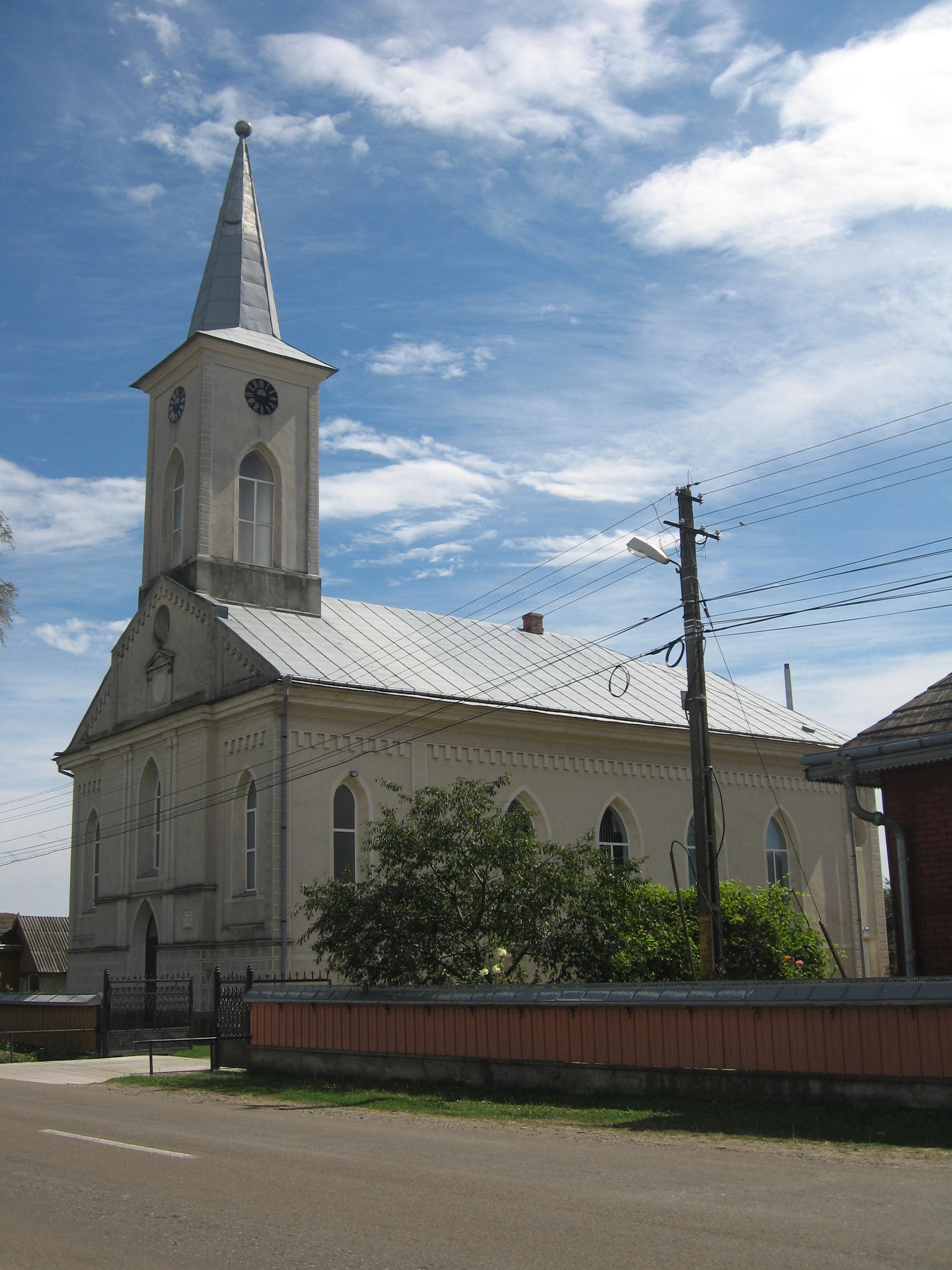
Former Lutheran church (now Orthodox) in Frătăuții Vechi (German: Alt Fratautz)

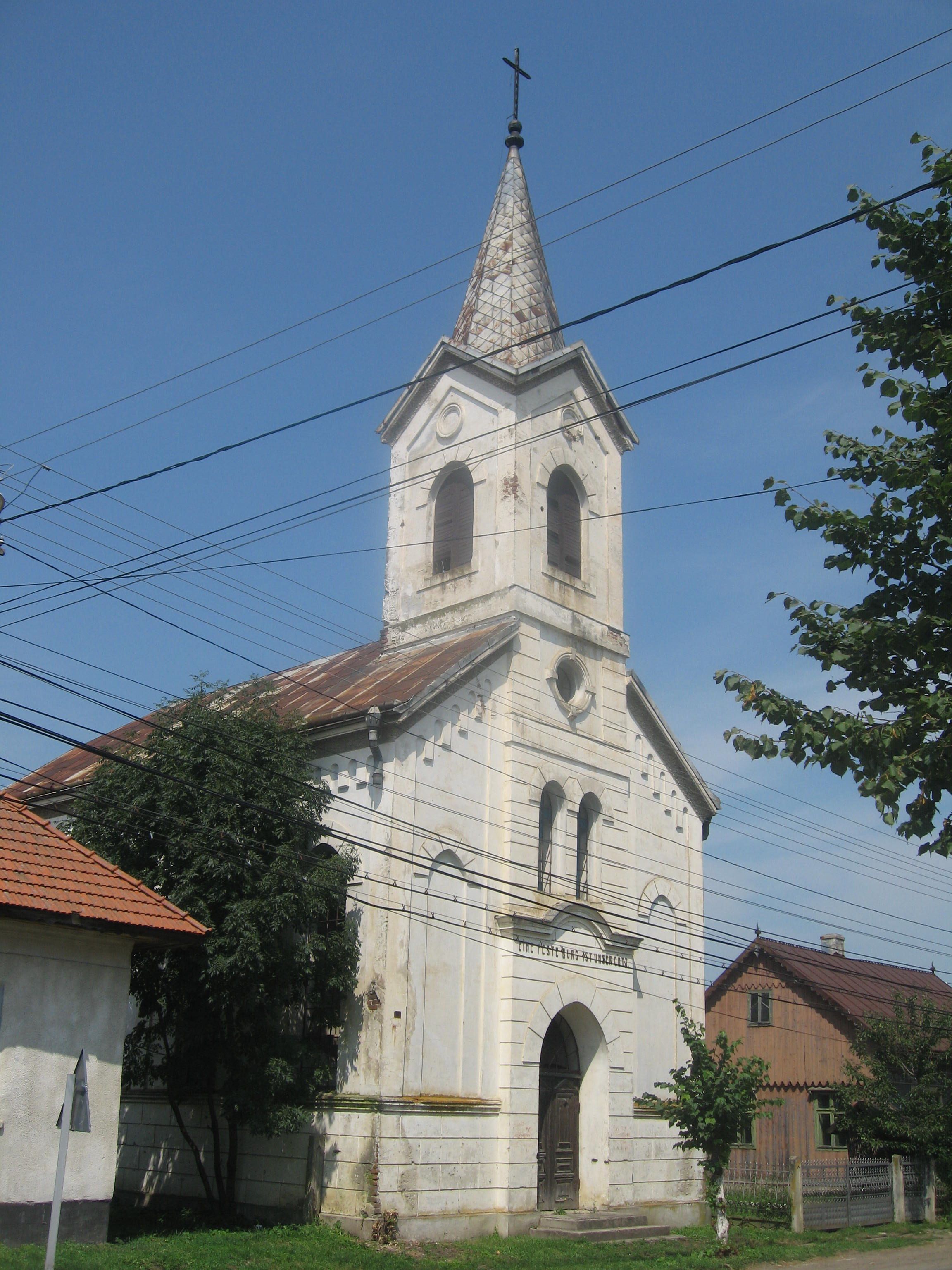
Former Lutheran church (now Orthodox) in Arbore (German: Arbora)

After 1840, a shortage of land caused the decline into poverty of the German rural lower classes; in the late 19th century parts of the German rural population alongside a few Romanians emigrated to the Americas, mainly to the United States (most notably to Ellis and Hays, both located in Kansas) but also to Canada.

Between 1849 and 1851, and from 1863 to 1918, the Duchy of Bukovina became an independent crown land within the Austrian Empire (see also: Cisleithania). However, at this time, in comparison with other Austrian crown lands, Bukovina remained a relatively underdeveloped region on the periphery of the realm, primarily supplying raw materials. This did not prevent it from being called '[the] Switzerland of the Orient' (i.e., of Eastern Europe) or 'Europe in miniature', due to its ethnic and cultural diversity spread over such a small territory.

The Franz-Josephs-Universität (Francisco-Josephina) in Cernăuți (German: Czernowitz) was founded in 1875, then the easternmost German-speaking university. In 1910–11, the Bukovinian Reconciliation (a political agreement between the peoples of Bukovina and their political representatives in the Landtag assembly on the question of autonomous regional administration) took place between the representatives of the nationalities.

During the first round of the 20th century, local German-language literature flourished through the writings of Rose Ausländer, Alfred Kittner, Alfred Margul Sperber, or Paul Celan. Other notable German writers of Bukovina include mixed Ukrainian-German intellectuals Ludwig Adolf Staufe-Simiginowicz and Olha Kobylianska (who was also remotely related to renowned German poet Zacharias Werner).

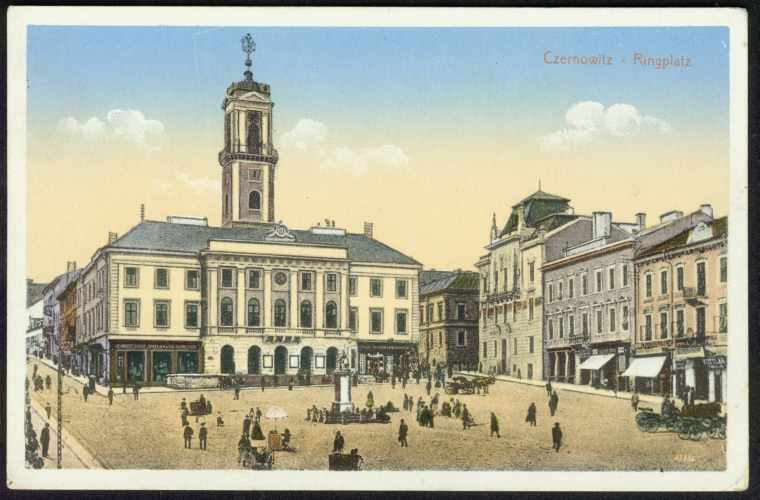
Cernăuți (German: Czernowitz) town hall, c. 1905

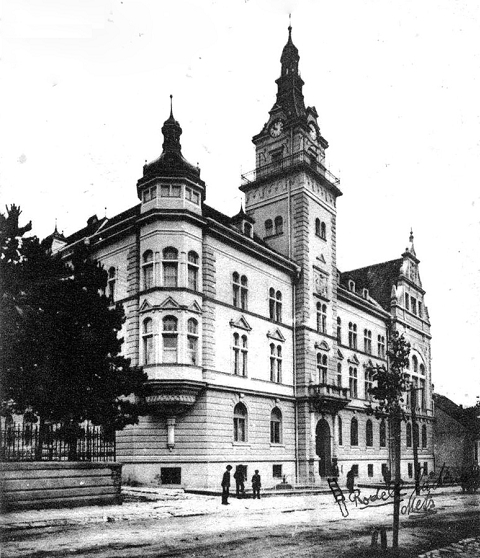
Suceava (German: Suczawa) town hall (nowadays administrative palace), early 20th century

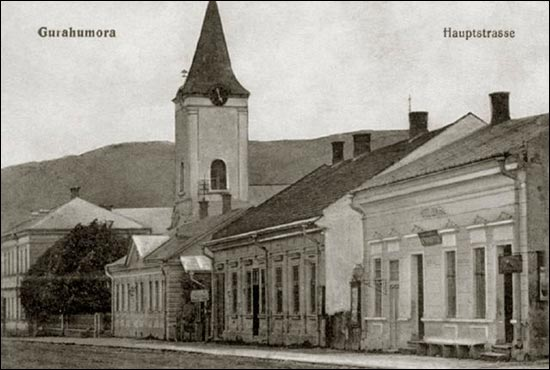
Roman Catholic church in Gura Humorului (German: Gura Humora), early 20th century

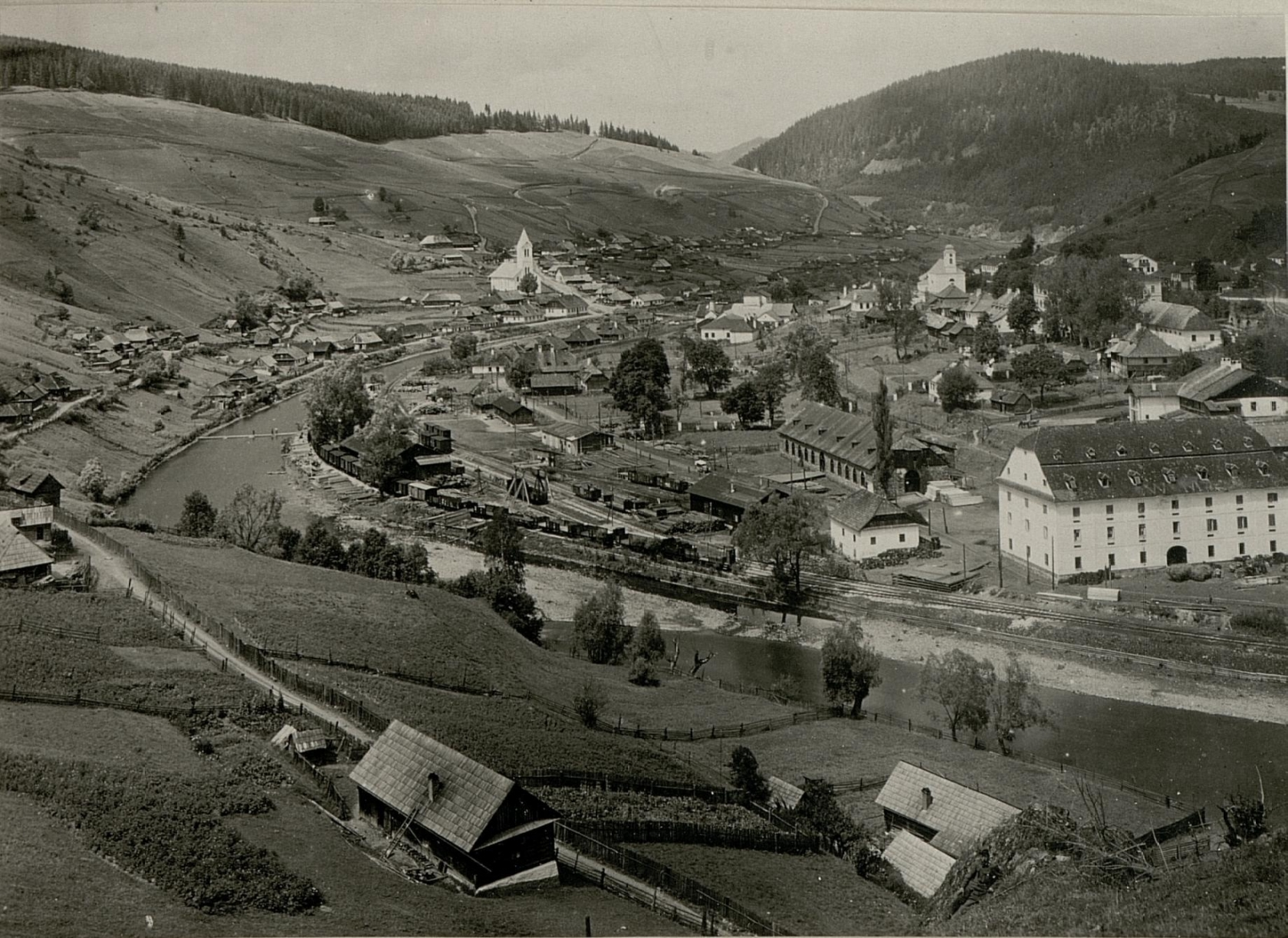
View of Iacobeni (German: Jakobeny), a Zipser German village, early 20th century

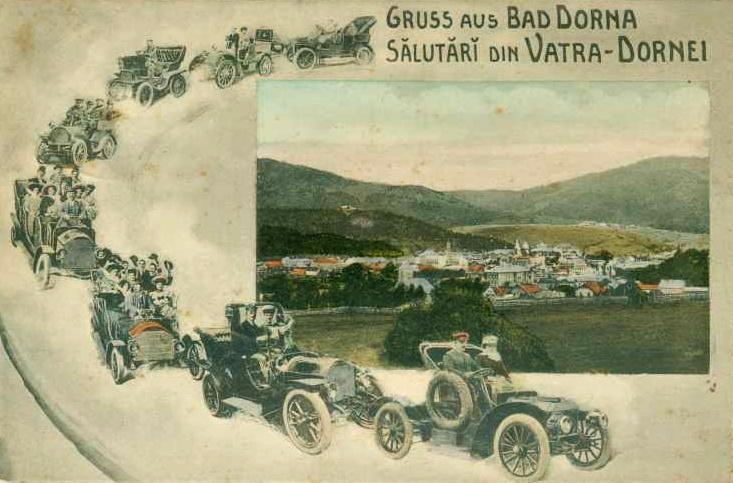
Bilingual German-Romanian postcard from Vatra Dornei (German: Dorna-Watra), early 20th century

=== Early 20th century and Kingdom of Romania (1918–1939) ===
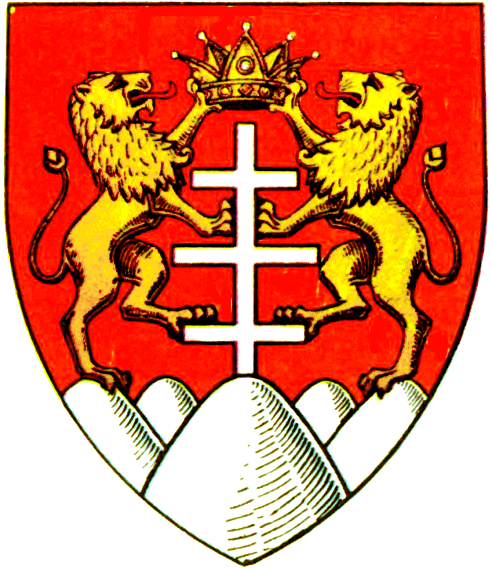
Coat of arms of interwar Suceava County, as part of the Kingdom of Romania

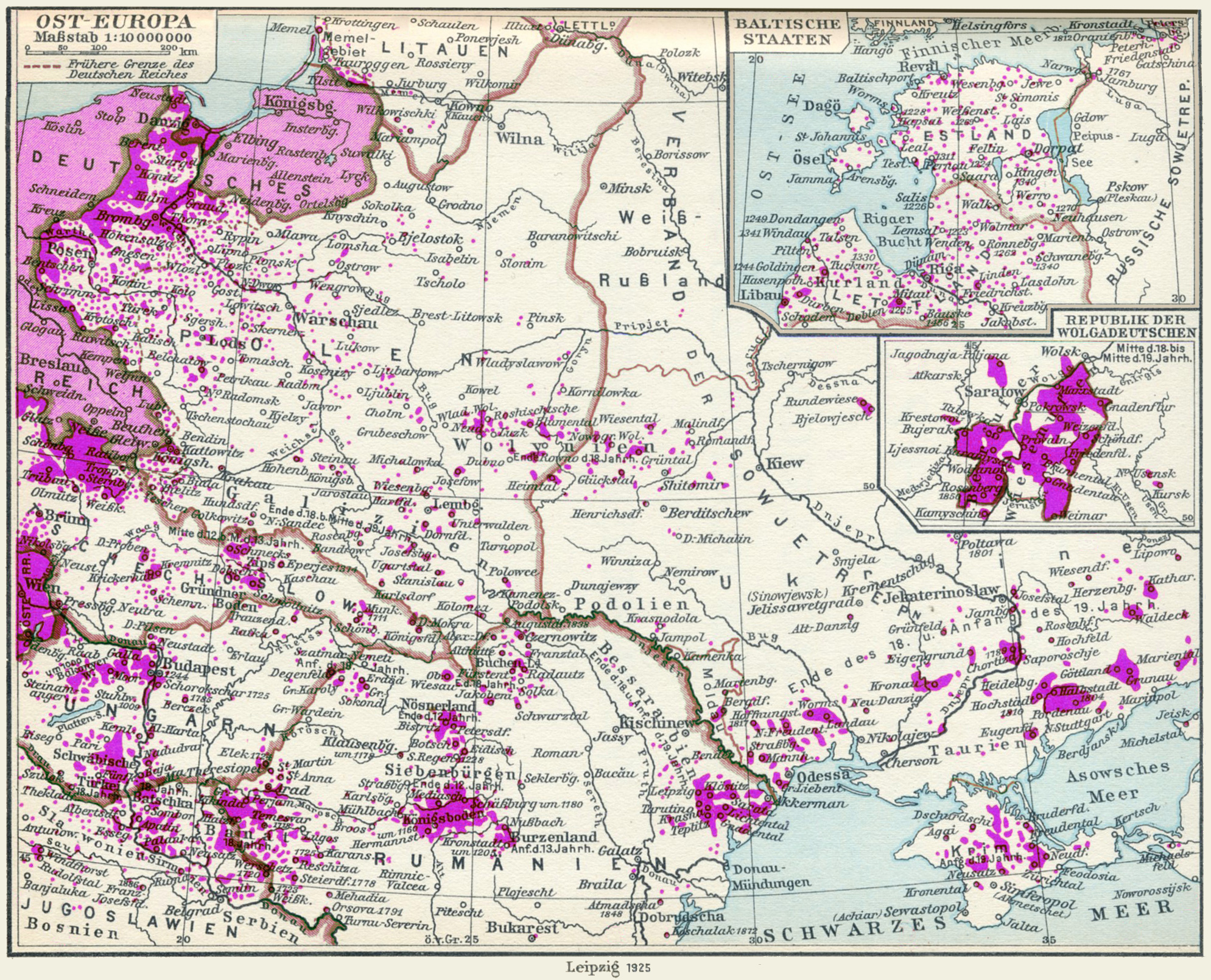
Map of German minorities in Eastern Europe during the interwar period, also highlighting German settlements in the Kingdom of Romania, including Bukovina.

From 1918 to 1919, following the end of World War I and the dissolution of the Austro-Hungarian Empire, Bukovina became part of the Kingdom of Romania. At the General Congress of Bukovina held on November 28, 1918, the political representatives of the Bukovina Germans voted and supported the union of Bukovina with the Romanian kingdom, alongside the Romanian and Polish representatives.

From 1933 up until 1940, some German societies and organizations opposed the propaganda of Nazi Germany and the national socialist-aligned so-called 'Reformation Movement'. Beginning in 1938 however, due to the poor economic situation and powerful national socialist propaganda, a pro-Third Reich mentality developed within the Bukovina German community. Because of this, many increased their preparedness for evacuation.

=== Outbreak of World War II and Heim ins Reich (1939–1941) ===
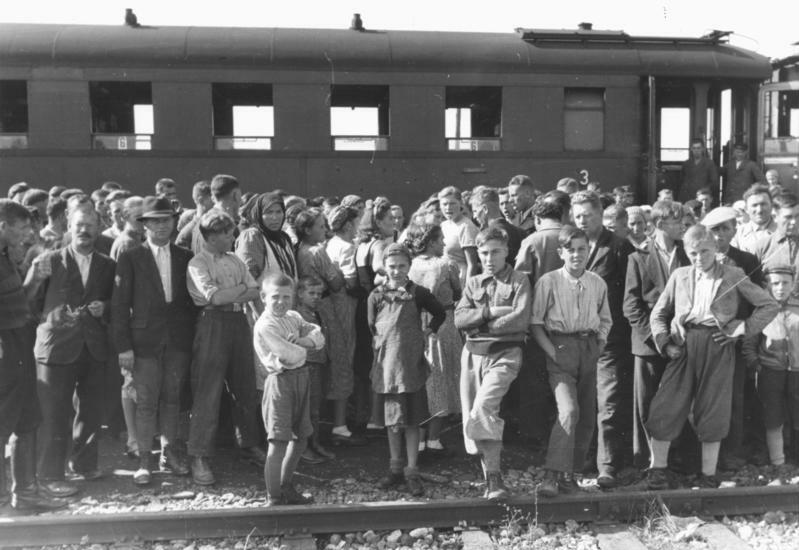
Bukovina and Bessarabia Germans arriving in Graz, Austria, in November, 1940, on their way of resettlement to Nazi-occupied Poland.

When Nazi Germany signed the Molotov–Ribbentrop Pact with the Soviet Union (USSR) in 1939 (just before the outbreak of World War II), the fate (unknown to those affected) of the Germans in Bukovina was sealed. In a secret supplementary protocol, it was agreed (among other points) that the northern part of Bukovina would be annexed by the Soviet Union under a territorial re-organization in Central-Eastern Europe, with the German sub-populations therein undergoing compulsory resettlement to other future Nazi-occupied territories. Under this military partitive accord, the Soviet Union occupied northern Romania in 1940.

Consequently, the Third Reich resettled nearly the entire German population of Bukovina (about 96,000 ethnic Germans) to, most notably, Nazi-occupied Poland, where the incoming evacuees were frequently compensated with expropriated farms. From 1941 to 1944, Bukovina was almost entirely Romanian-populated. Additionally, most of the Jewish population (c. 30% of the regional population as a whole) were murdered by the Third Reich in collaboration with fascist Romania under Marshal Ion Antonescu during The Holocaust.

In the nearly completely deserted Bukovina German villages during World War II, the local German communities transferred their local architectural heritage (e.g. churches for example) to the Romanian community free of charge and without any conditions.

=== Resettlement in the wake of World War II (1945–1947) ===
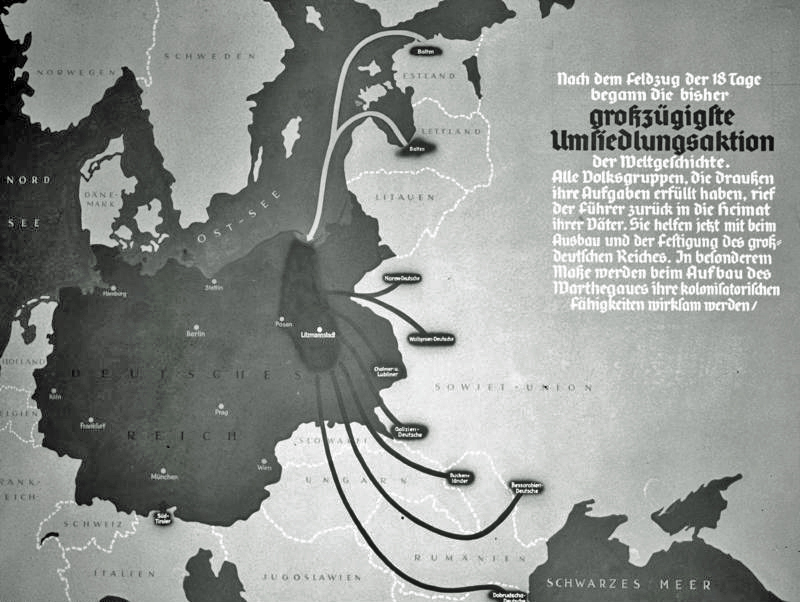
As other German groups from Romania, the Bukovina Germans were mostly forcefully re-settled by the national socialists (i.e. Nazis) during World War II. In the case of the Bukovina Germans, they were sent to occupied Poland (or the General Government), as it can be clearly seen on this map.

In 1944–45, as the Russian front moved closer to the Kingdom of Romania, the Bukovina Germans who were forcefully settled in Polish areas (like the remaining German population), fled westward or wherever they could manage. Some remained in what was to be East Germany while others went to Austria. In 1945, during the last year of war, the 7,500 or so remaining Germans in Bukovina were evacuated to Germany, ending (except for a relatively feeble number of persons) a significant German presence in Bukovina, Romania after 1940.

During the post-World War II era, the Bukovina Germans, as other 'homeland refugees' (known as Volksdeutsche in German), assimilated into the Federal Republic, Austria, or the German Democratic Republic (German: Deutsche Demokratische Republik). Nonetheless, small numbers of ethnic Germans (along with their families) returned to Romania after the resettlement plan failed, most notably the Zipser Germans, but also some Bukovina Germans.

=== After World War II and life under communist Romania (1945–1989) ===
After the end of World War II, the German community of Bukovina declined dramatically in numbers, with only several thousand ethnic Germans still residing in Suceava County (German: Kreis Suczawa) and a few waves of returning expelled Bukovina Germans re-settling the county. As with the rest of the German community in Bukovina (and in general in Romania for that matter), they were constantly harassed by and under the surveillance of the Securitatea (the approximate equivalent or counterpart of Stasi in East Germany), the secret police in communist Romania, as recorded for the first time in their logs in October 1956.

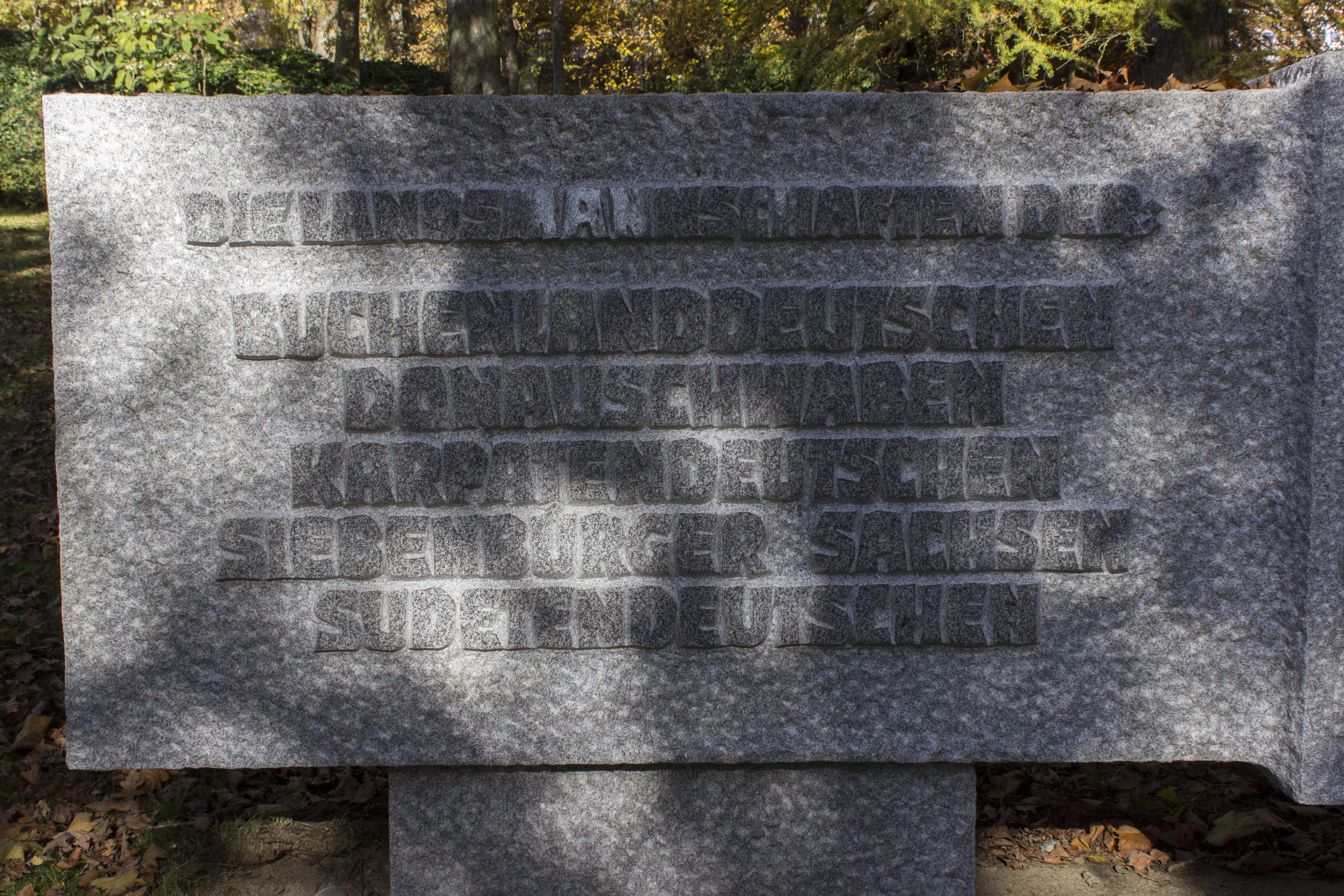
Commemorative plaque of the displaced/expelled Germans from Eastern-Central Europe in Linz, Austria, with the Bukovina Germans being the first to be mentioned on the list.

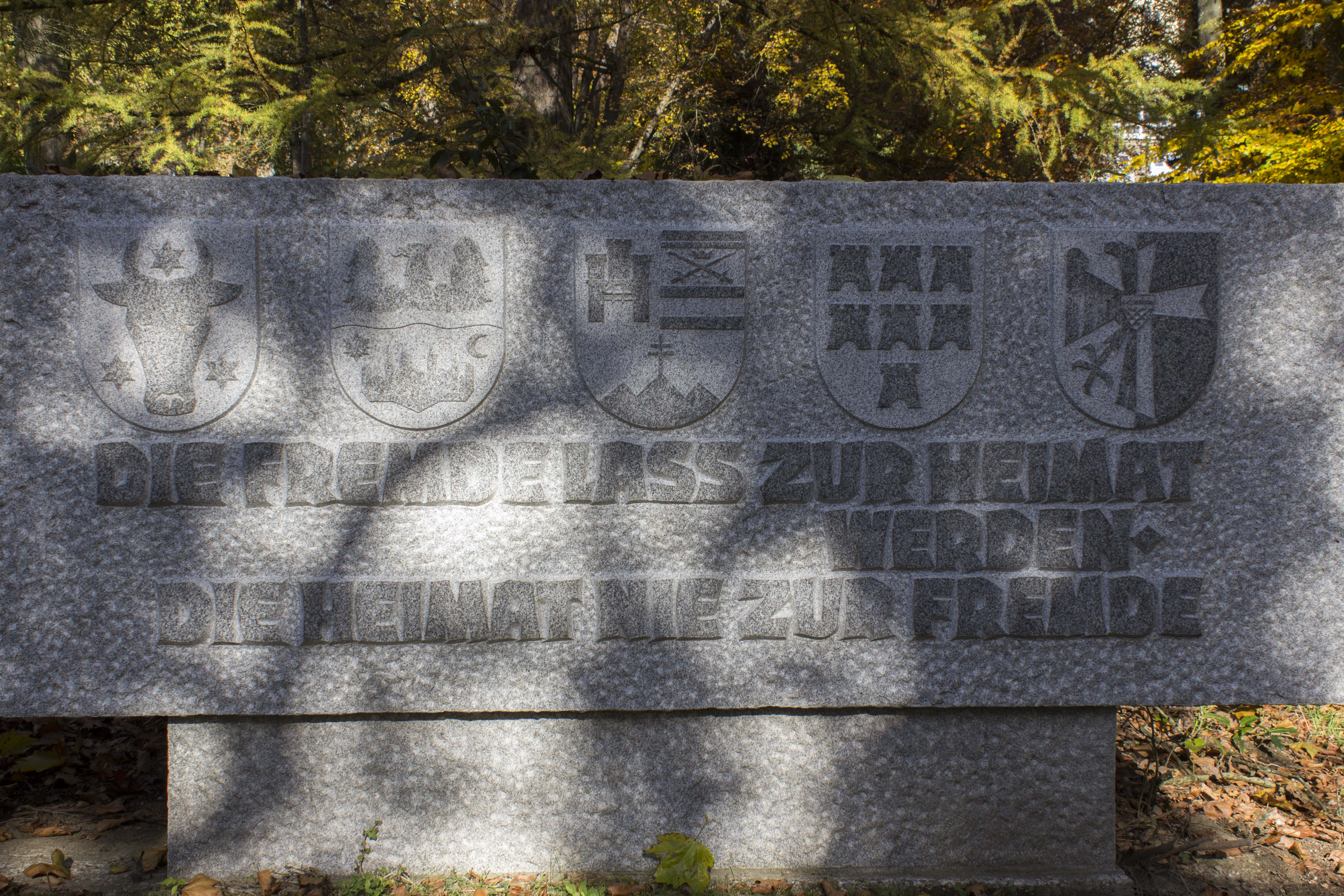
Commemorative plaque in Linz, Austria, dedicated to the expelled ethnic German groups from Central-Eastern Europe, with the coat of arms of the Bukovina Germans being the first to the left.

The documents of the Romanian communist secret police showcased the fact that many remaining Bukovina Germans expressed their interest to flee the country and immigrate to West Germany. Furthermore, only a few of them had been suspected on the grounds of anti-national sentiment alongside some Ukrainians, as shown by the same reports of the communist Romanian secret police. In the meantime, mixed Romanian-German families formed in this part of Romania as well, as they have formed prior to the end of World War II and the rise of communism as well. However, after 1989, very few Bukovina Germans (including those from mixed families) remained in the county of Suceava, most of them immigrating to West Germany. Nevertheless, some of them return almost on a yearly basis in their ancestral towns of Bukovina.

=== In contemporary Romania (1989–present) ===
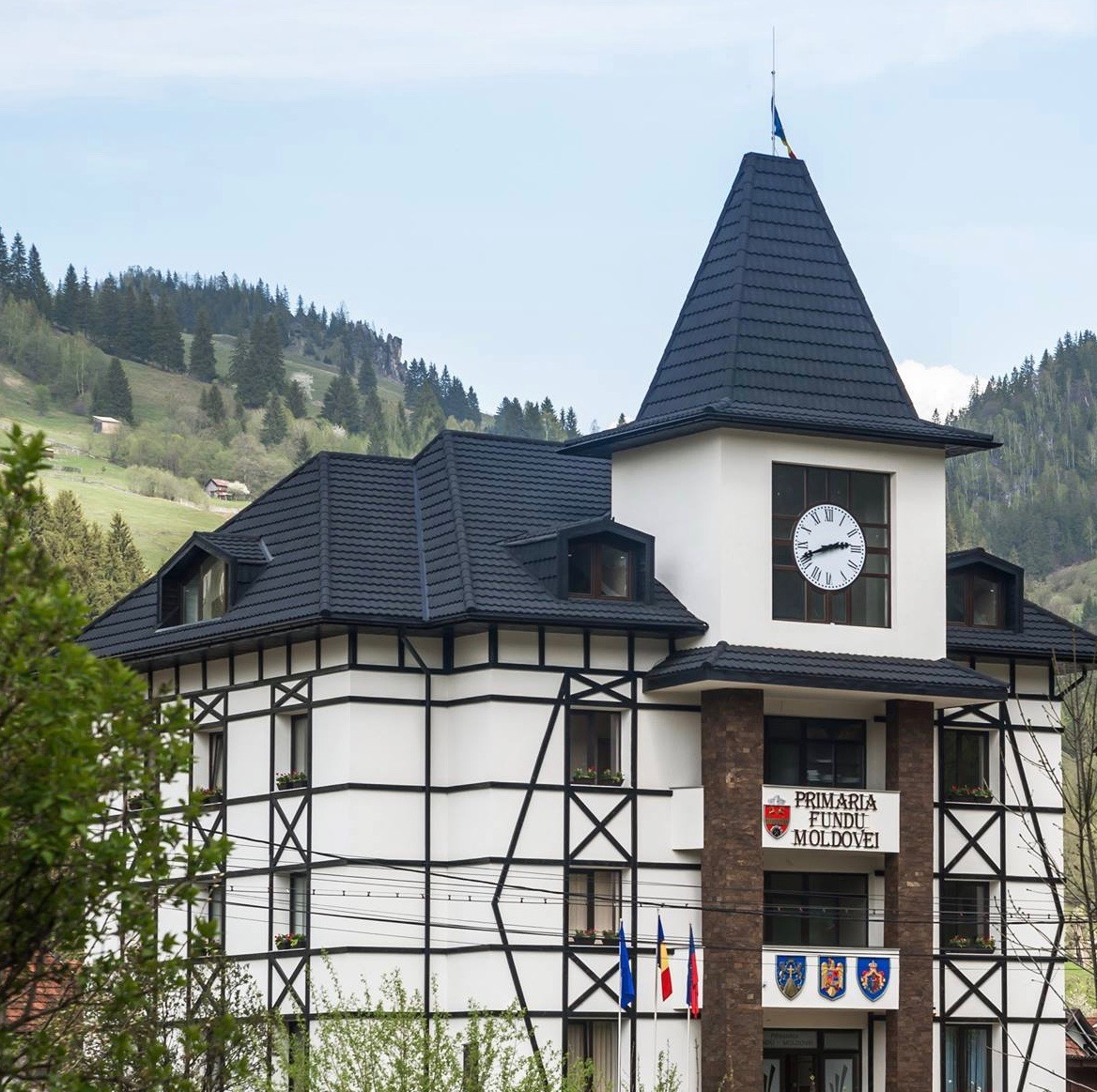
Fundu Moldovei (German: Luisenthal), situated in the western part of Suceava County, a notable example of a rural settlement previously inhabited by Zipser German miners.

During the early 21st century, the German community of Bukovina had dwindled dramatically and is currently on the verge of extinction. Nowadays, according to an estimate, the German community in Suceava County represents 0.3% of the total population of the county.

Most of the rural settlements inhabited by the Bukovina Germans are totally or almost totally devoid of any ethnic Germans still left there and most of their historical heritage (i.e. churches and houses) were given to the local Romanian communities free of charge after most of the Bukovina Germans departed during World War II.

Some of the towns and municipalities of Suceava County, most notably the county seat Suceava, are still home to a larger community of native ethnic Germans compared to the countryside which had been nearly completely deserted by the Bukovina Germans in the wake of World War II and after the fall of the Iron Curtain.

Nevertheless, the local branches of FDGR/DFDR in Suceava County are still functional and many local German culture-based festivals (akin to Haferland week of the Transylvanian Saxons) have been held thus far, with numerous members of the Bukovina German diaspora returning home on their occasion, especially in the town of Suceava (German: Suczawa). Furthermore, Germany is also the second most important economic partner and foreign investor of Suceava County, as reported by the prefect of the county in 2021.

== Demographics ==
Historical population
Year	Pop.	±%
1869	40,000	—
1910	73,000	+82.5%
1930	75,533	+3.5%
1940	100,000	+32.4%
1945	7,500	−92.5%
1956	3,981	−46.9%
1966	2,830	−28.9%
1977	2,265	−20.0%
1992	2,376	+4.9%
2002	1,773	−25.4%
2011	717	−59.6%
2022	475	−33.8%
Austrian and Romanian censuses and estimates. After 1940, statistics refer solely to the extent of present-day Suceava County. Source:

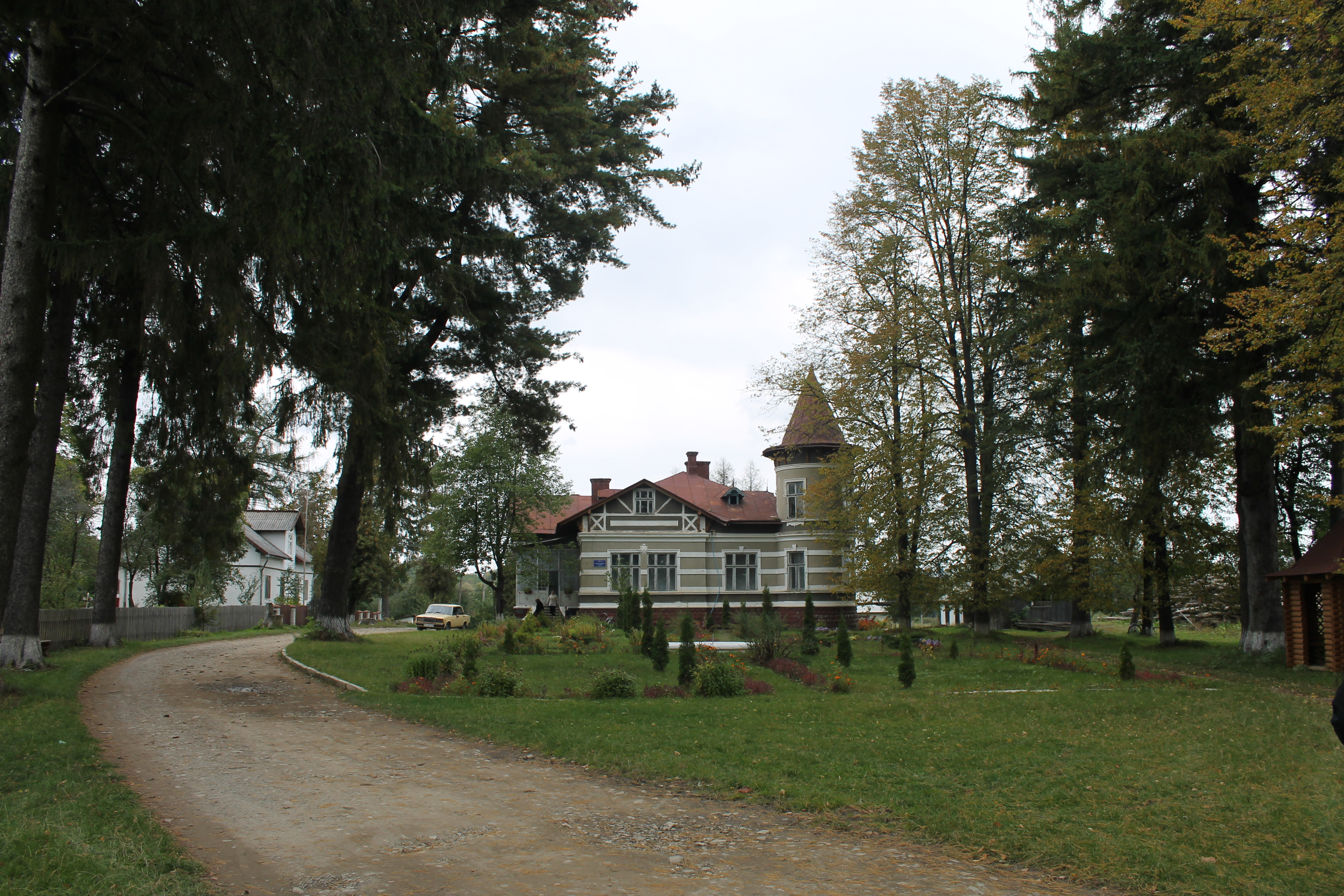
Bănilă pe Siret (German: Augustendorf), a locality in northern Bukovina previously inhabited by Bukovina Germans. The photograph depicts the manor of the Gross family in the park of the village.

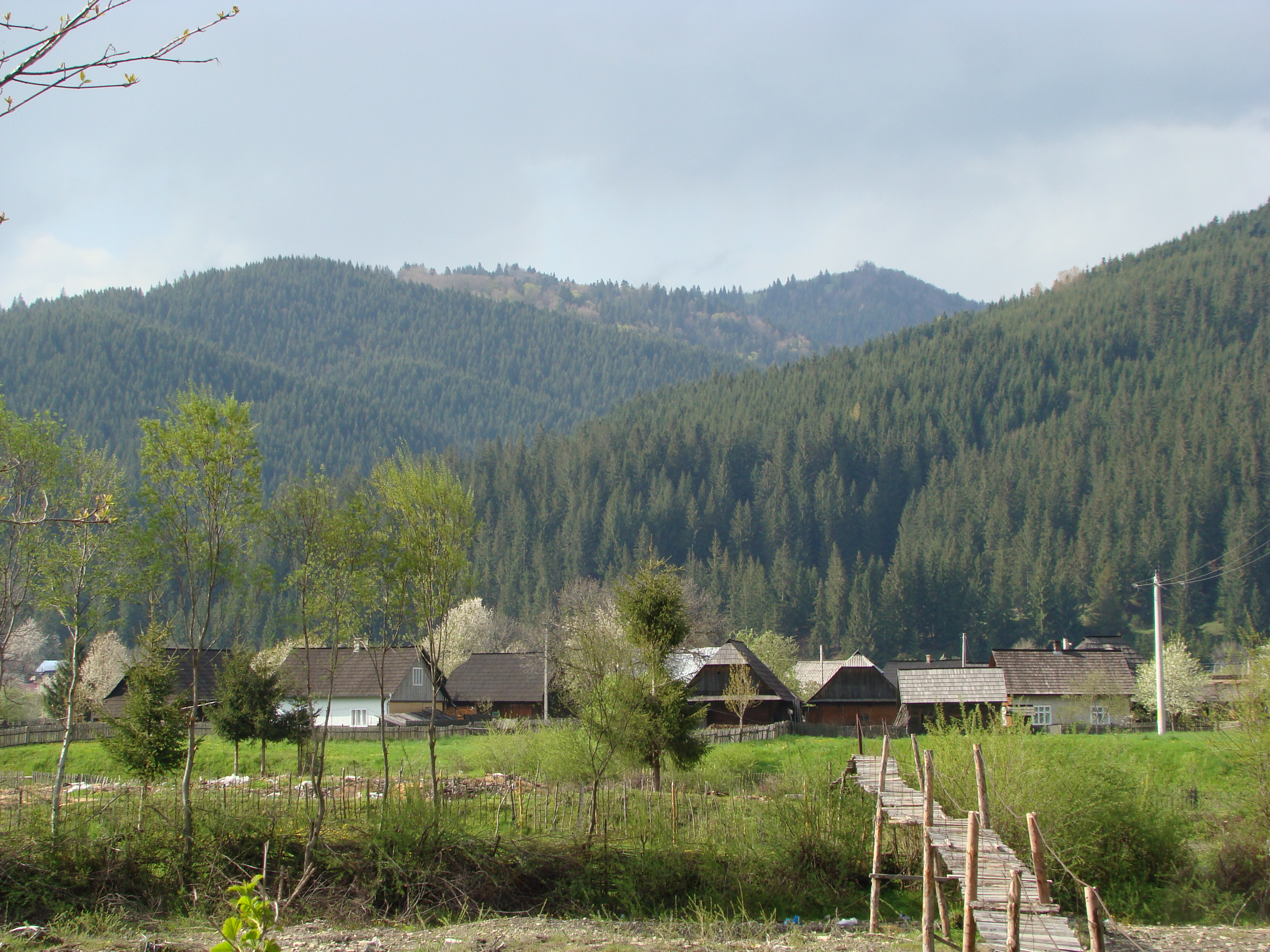
Straja (German: Strasza or Strascha), an example of a rural settlement in southern Bukovina where Germans were the second most numerous ethnic group after the Romanian majority.

According to the Austrian census of 1869, there were approximately 40,000 ethnic Germans recorded from a total population of Bukovina of over 500,000 inhabitants. The 1930 Romanian census recorded c. 75,000 ethnic Germans in Bukovina. According to another source, namely an article of the Romanian Academy from 2019, there were c. 76,000 ethnic Germans in Bukovina in 1930 and 44% of them lived in urban settlements. Overall, the Bukovina Germans made up 12.46% of the total population of the interwar Suceava County at that time.

As it was during Austrian times, the two largest numbers of German urban dwellers were to be found in Cernăuți (German: Czernowitz) (the largest town of Bukovina in Romanian royal times as well) and in Suceava (German: Suczawa). Other large urban German communities were also present in Rădăuți (German: Radautz), Gura Humorului (German: Gura Humora), and Câmpulung Moldovenesc (German: Kimpolung). In rural settlements, the Germans from Bukovina were still more present, especially in the south and south-west of the region, towards the Carpathian Mountains and the Bistrița river valley, where most Zipser Germans had previously settled.

Generally, the Bukovina Germans used to be the dominant ethnic group in several towns in Bukovina throughout the 19th century and early 20th century. After the union of Bukovina with the Kingdom of Romania, for which both all German and Polish representatives in the parliament of the region (previously under Austrian rulership) voted for, the number of urban German dwellers slowly but steadily decreased in the towns yet still remained strong in the countryside, in many waldhufendorfs (i.e. forest villages) which they helped develop.

On the verge of World War II, the vast majority Bukovina Germans were re-settled by Nazi Germany to areas occupied by it in Eastern-Central Europe. After the end of the war, few of these Germans decided to come back. During Communism in Romania, the German community in Bukovina numbered a few thousand and most of them eventually emigrated to West Germany prior to 1989 or to unified Germany after the Romanian Revolution of 1989, leaving a very small number of ethnic Germans still living in Suceava County.

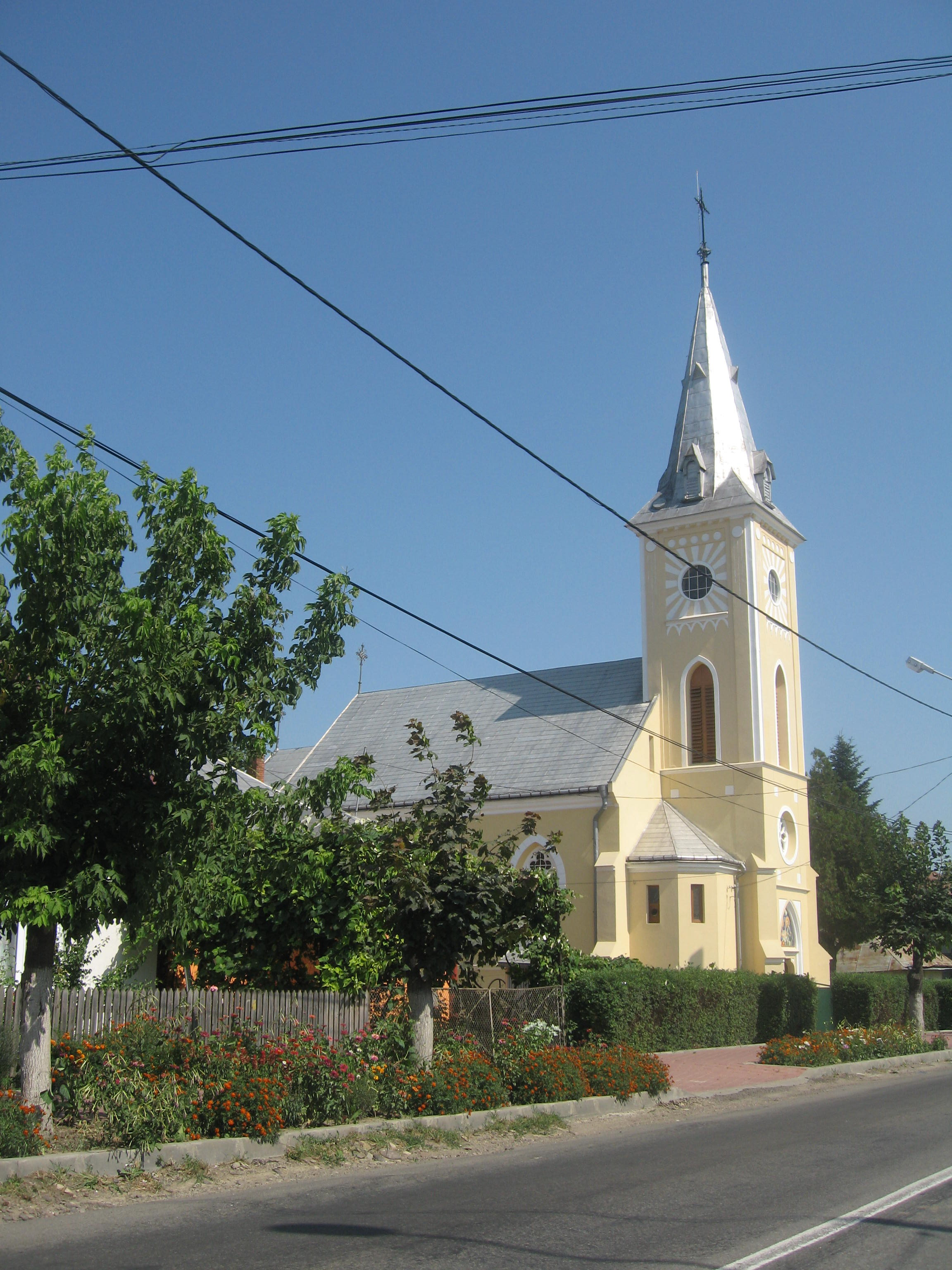
Ițcani (German: Itzkany), formerly a village and now a suburb of Suceava which was home to a sizable population of Bukovina Germans up until World War II (and, to a lesser extent, afterwards as well). (Note: Photographed is the former Evangelical Lutheran church (now Romanian Orthodox).)

According to the 2011 Romanian census, the German minority in southern Bukovina makes up only 0.11% of the total population (including Zipsers and smaller numbers of Regat Germans in Fălticeni). Consequently, the rural and urban settlements of Suceava County, where small German communities still live to this day, are the following ones (according to the 2011 Romanian census):

- Suceava (German: Suczawa): 0.18%
- Rădăuți (German: Radautz): 0.27%
- Gura Humorului (German: Gura Humora): 0.52%
- Câmpulung Moldovenesc (German: Kimpolung): 0.25%
- Fălticeni (German: Foltischeni): 0.02%
- Mănăstirea Humorului (German: Humora Kloster): 1%
- Vatra Moldoviței (German: Watra): 0.25%
- Cârlibaba (German: Ludwigsdorf/Mariensee/Kirlibaba): 5.06%
- Solca (German: Solka): 0.63%
- Siret (German: Sereth): 0.42%
- Vatra Dornei (German: Dorna Watra or Dorna-Watra): 0.23%

== Religion ==
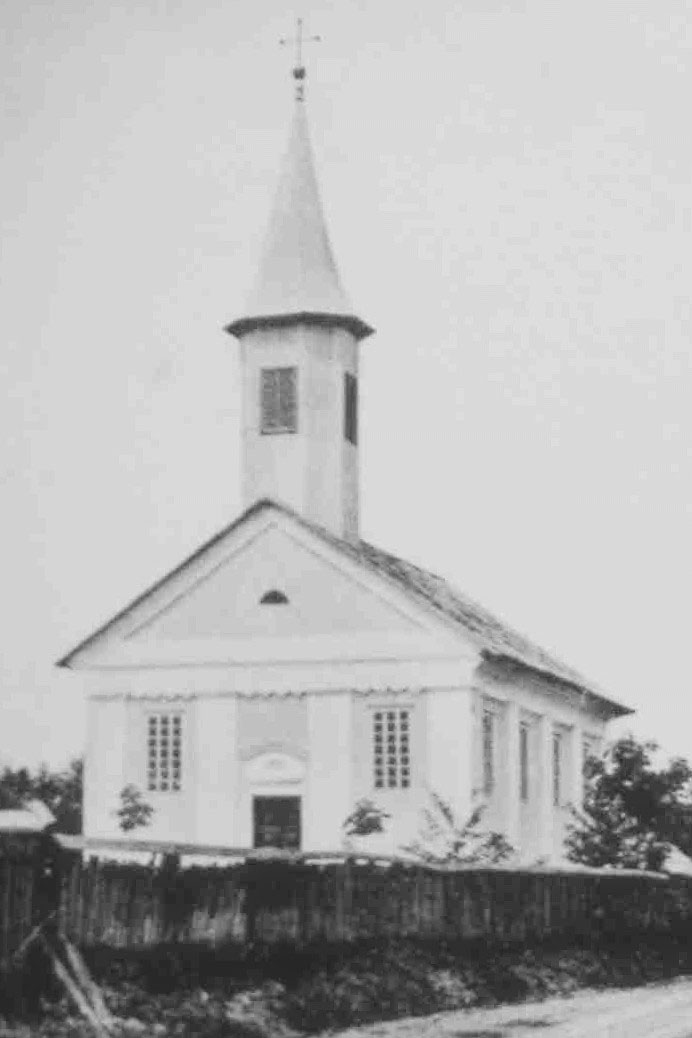
Former Lutheran church in Hlyboka (German: Hliboka, Romanian: Adâncata)

Before the outbreak of World War II, the vast majority of the Bukovina Germans were Roman Catholic. As opposed to the Transylvanian Saxons in neighbouring Transylvania who have been reformed as Lutherans (and, to a smaller extent, Calvinists) since the 16th century (the vast majority of them, that is), the Bukovina Germans were Roman Catholic with Lutherans in minority among them. When they firstly immigrated to the Midwestern United States during the 1880s, the Bukovina Germans were both Roman Catholic and Lutheran settlers.

== Flag of the Bukovina Germans ==
The flag of the Bukovina Germans is a cultural representation of their regional identity and affiliation with Bukovina, Romania. The flag encloses the coat of arms of the historical region of Bukovina as it was conceived and official during imperial Austrian times.

== Culture and cuisine ==
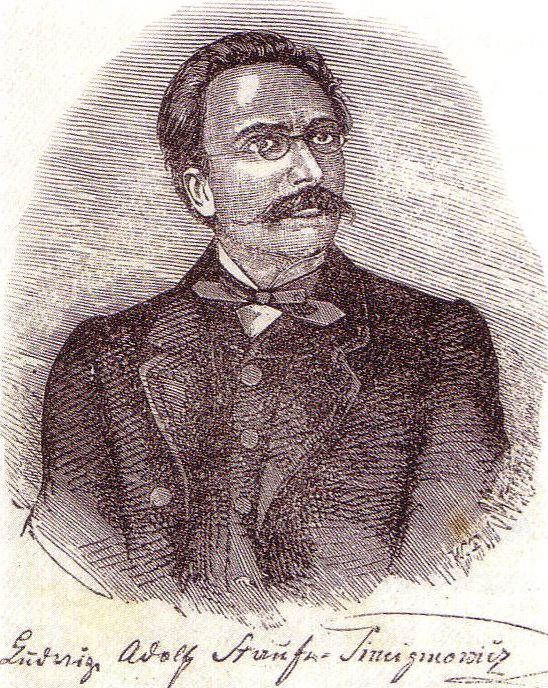
Ludwig Adolf Staufe-Simiginowicz, one of the most well known Bukovina German writers who was born in Suceava (German: Suczawa).

The regional culture and cuisine of the Bukovina Germans is very similar to other regional cultures and cuisines of the peoples of Central Europe, in particular, naturally, similar to German and Austrian cuisine. Furthermore, the regional cuisine of the Bukovina Germans is similar to the German-Bohemian cuisine.

In terms of Bukovina German literature, Gregor von Rezzori and Ludwig Adolf Staufe-Simiginowicz are the most well known writers. Simiginowicz wrote Volkssagen aus der Bukowina (a compilation of folk songs from the entire region of Bucovina). He also collected fairytales from Bucovina. He was born in Suceava (German: Suczawa) and studied history and German studies in Vienna. A noteworthy German-language poet in Bukovina was Ernst Rudolf Neubauer. Another German-language poet was Olha Kobylianska (who was distantly related to German poet Zacharias Werner).

== Historical occupations ==
In the passing of time, since the Austrian/Habsburg annexation of Bukovina, the Bukovina Germans had the following main occupations:

- Miners;
- Lumberjacks;
- Farmers;
- Glassmakers;
- Craftsmen.

Even further back in time, the Transylvanian Saxon community which settled during the 14th century on the present-day Suceava County excelled at trade and craftsmanship.

== Organisations and cultural institutions ==
=== In Romania ===
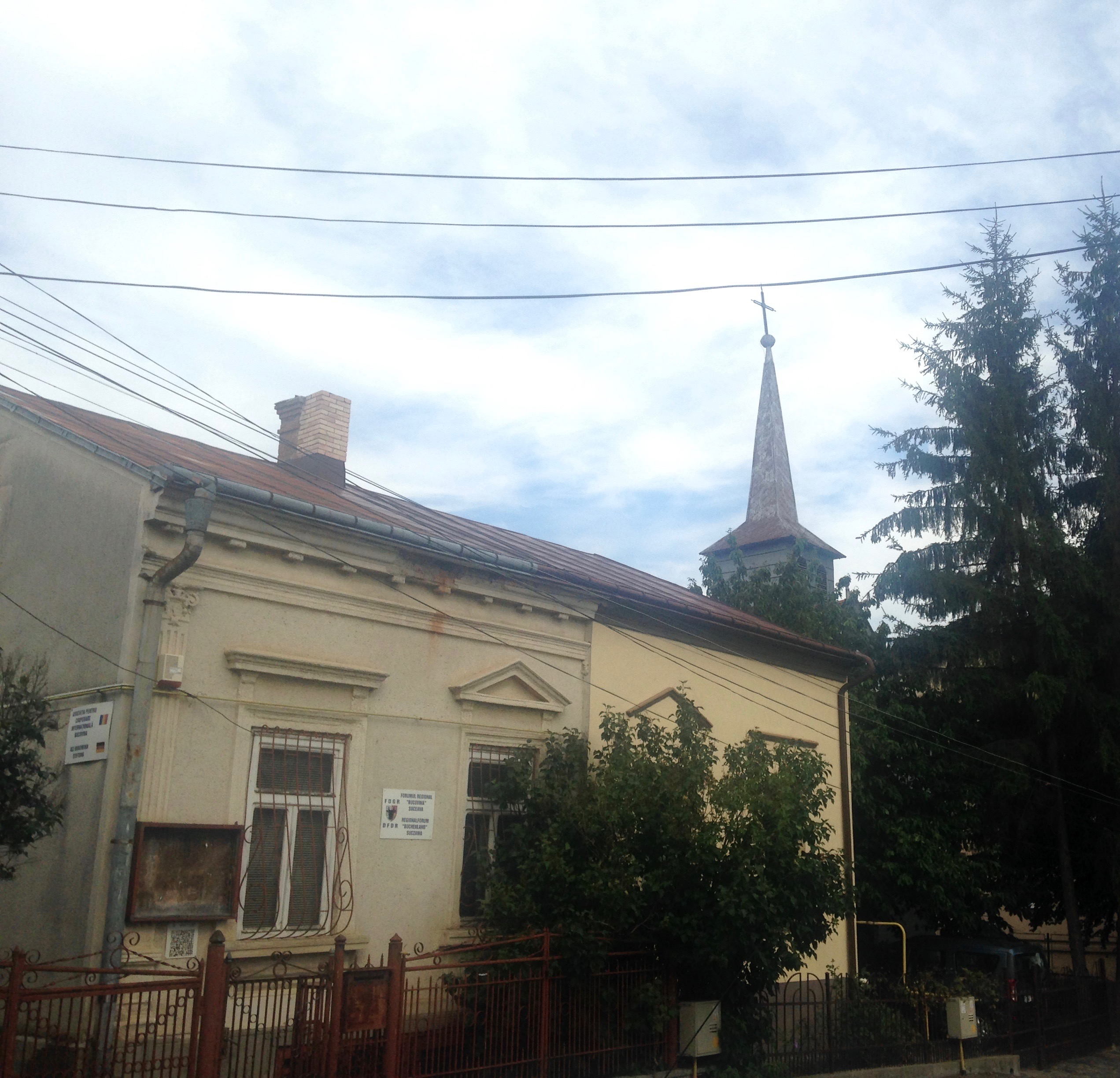
The seat of the Democratic Forum of Germans in Romania (FDGR/DFDR), Suceava/Bukovina branch (German: Das Demokratisches Forum der Deutschen in Buchenland) in Suceava in 2020.

The political representation of the Bukovina Germans (and of all other German-speaking groups in contemporary Romania) is the DFDR/FDGR (German: Demokratisches Forum der Deutschen in Rumänien, Romanian: Forumul Democrat al Germanilor din România) which has a local branch operating in Suceava County with headquarters in the town of Suceava (German: Suczawa). The Union of Germans in Rădăuți (German: Verein der Buchenlanddeutschen, Romanian: Uniunea Germanilor Bucovineni Rădăuți) is a cultural association which has the seat at the local German House (German: Deutsches Haus) in the town, being presided by Carol Alexander Mohr. Both associations are active to this day.

The regional president of FDGR/DFDR Bucovina/Buchenland is Josef-Otto Exner, who is also in charge of the ACI Bukowina Stiftung, a cultural foundation/association aiming to enhance ties between Romania and Germany. Very much unlike other local chapters of the FDGR/DFDR, the local chapter in Suceava hasn't ran in local elections for many years, more specifically since the 2000 Romanian local elections. It obtained its most significant electoral results at the 1996 Romanian local elections.

Therefore, the FDGR/DFDR in Suceava, Suceava County has been operating for many years more in a cultural and symbolical manner for the local small German community, being otherwise politically inactive. The headquarters of the local branch of FDGR/DFDR in Suceava, Suceava County, Bukovina is situated on Armenească street. The president of the local branch of FDGR/DFDR for Suceava County/Bukovina is Antonia Maria-Gheorghiu (as of 2023). The executive director of the local branch of FDGR/DFDR in Suceava County/Bukovina is Carmen Cobliș (as of 2023).

=== In Germany ===
After World War II, the Bukovina Germans who settled in West Germany founded the Landsmannschaft der Buchenlanddeutschen im Bundesrepublik Deutschland (Homeland Association of the Bukovina Germans in the Federal Republic of Germany) which was active from 1949 until 2020. Others, who decided to settle in Austria, founded the Landsmannschaft der Buchenlanddeutschen in Österreich (Homeland Association of the Bukovina Germans in the Federal Republic of Austria).

=== In the United States of America (USA) ===
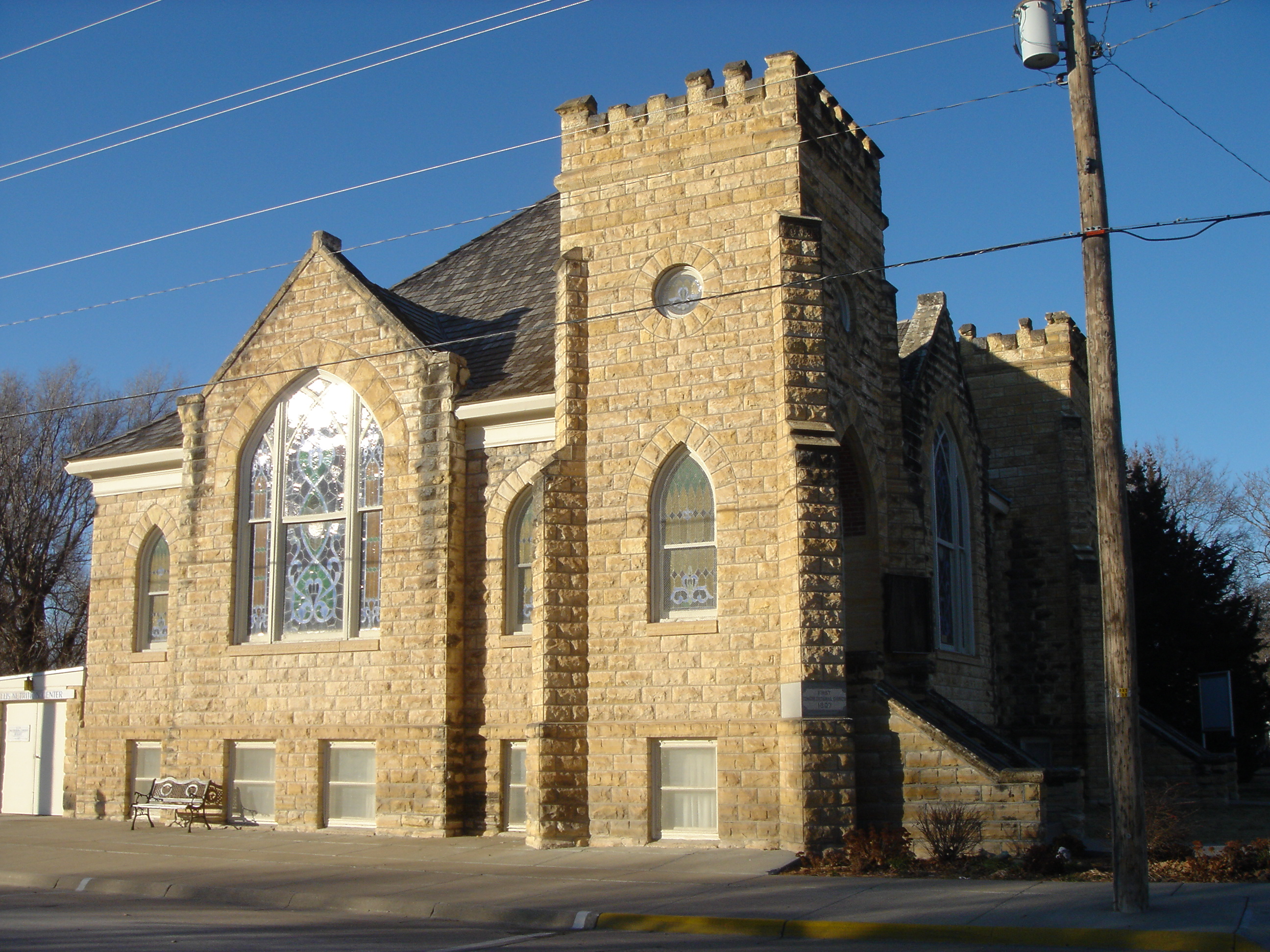
The former Congregationalist Church and the headquarters of the Bukovina Society of the Americas located in Ellis, Kansas.

The Americans of Bukovina German descent stem from the 19th century German emigrants from Bukovina to North America and their communities are mainly found in the Midwestern United States, particularly in Kansas. Together with other groups of Americans of German heritage, the American citizens of Bukovina German descent are part of the larger American-German community (the largest self-reported ancestry group on the territory of the United States of America, accounting for nearly 13% of US population).

In the Midwestern United States, more specifically in the state of Kansas, there is a museum of the Bukovina German community, displaying the history of their overseas settlement process. The museum was opened in 1988 in the small town of Ellis. It is currently presided by Doug Reckmann and is similar to the local FDGR/DFDR in Suceava County, Romania in its structure and membership.

== Notable people ==
- Elisabeth Axmann, writer
- Olha Kobylianska (partly Bukovina German), writer
- Otto Babiasch, Olympic boxer
- Viktor Pestek, Auschwitz guard who helped a prisoner escape, for which he was executed in 1944
- Alfred Kuzmany, Nazi general
- Eduard Neumann, Luftwaffe officer
- Stefan Baretzki, Auschwitz guard who murdered more than 8,000 people
- Ewald Burian, military officer
- Franz Des Loges, former mayor of Suceava
- Alfred Eisenbeisser, professional footballer
- Stefan Hantel (partly Bukovina German), musician
- Anton Keschmann, politician in the Imperial Austrian Parliament
- Roman Neumayer, inductee into German Ice Hockey Hall of Fame
- George Ostafi, abstract painter
- Francisc Rainer, physiologist and anthropologist
- Ludovic Iosif Urban Rudescu, biologist
- Gregor von Rezzori (partly Bukovina German), writer
- Roman Sondermajer (partly Bukovina German), physician, surgeon, and associate professor
- Constantin Schumacher (partly German), professional footballer
- Ludwig Adolf Staufe-Simiginowicz (partly Bukovina German), poet and educator
- Joseph Weber, Roman Catholic prelate
- Lothar Würzel, journalist, linguist, and politician
- Hugo Weczerka, regional historian
- Erich Beck, researcher and academician, Doctor Honoris Causa of Ștefan cel Mare University of Suceava

== See also ==
- List of governors of Bukovina
- List of Landeshauptmann of Bukovina (Note: A Landeshauptmann is an Austrian chairman of a state government. It is both a past and a current administrative title.)
- Jahn Cernăuți, a bygone German football club in Bukovina
- Vorwärts (i.e. Forward, a bygone German-language newspaper in Bukovina)
- Bukovina Society Headquarters and Museum
- Ellis, Kansas, a Midwestern American town with a sizable Bukovina German community by heritage
- Hays, Kansas, a Midwestern American town with a sizable German community by heritage
- Germans of Romania
- Zipser Germans
- Transylvanian Saxons
- Banat Swabians and Banat Highland Germans
- Bessarabia Germans
- Dobrujan Germans
