= Poieni-Solca =

- Commune
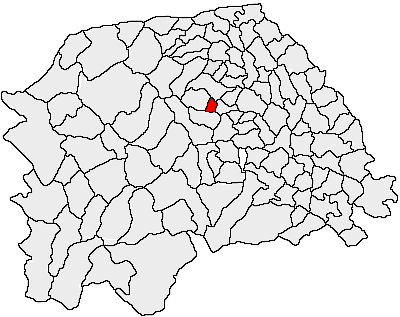
- Location in Suceava County

- Location in Romania
- Coordinates: 47°41′N 25°54′E
- Country: Romania
- County: Suceava

Government
  - Mayor (2024–2028): Dumitru-Ichim Lăzărean (PSD)
- Area: 15 km^{2} (6 sq mi)
- Elevation: 430 m (1,410 ft)
- Population (2021-12-01): 1,941
  - Density: 130/km^{2} (340/sq mi)
- Time zone: EET/EEST (UTC+2/+3)
- Postal code: 725601
- Area code: (+40) x30
- Vehicle reg.: SV
- Website: comunapoienisolca.ro

Poieni-Solca (German: Pojeni) is a commune located in Suceava County, Romania. Composed of a single village, Poieni-Solca, it was established in 2007 when it was split from Solca town.
