= Arbore =

- Commune
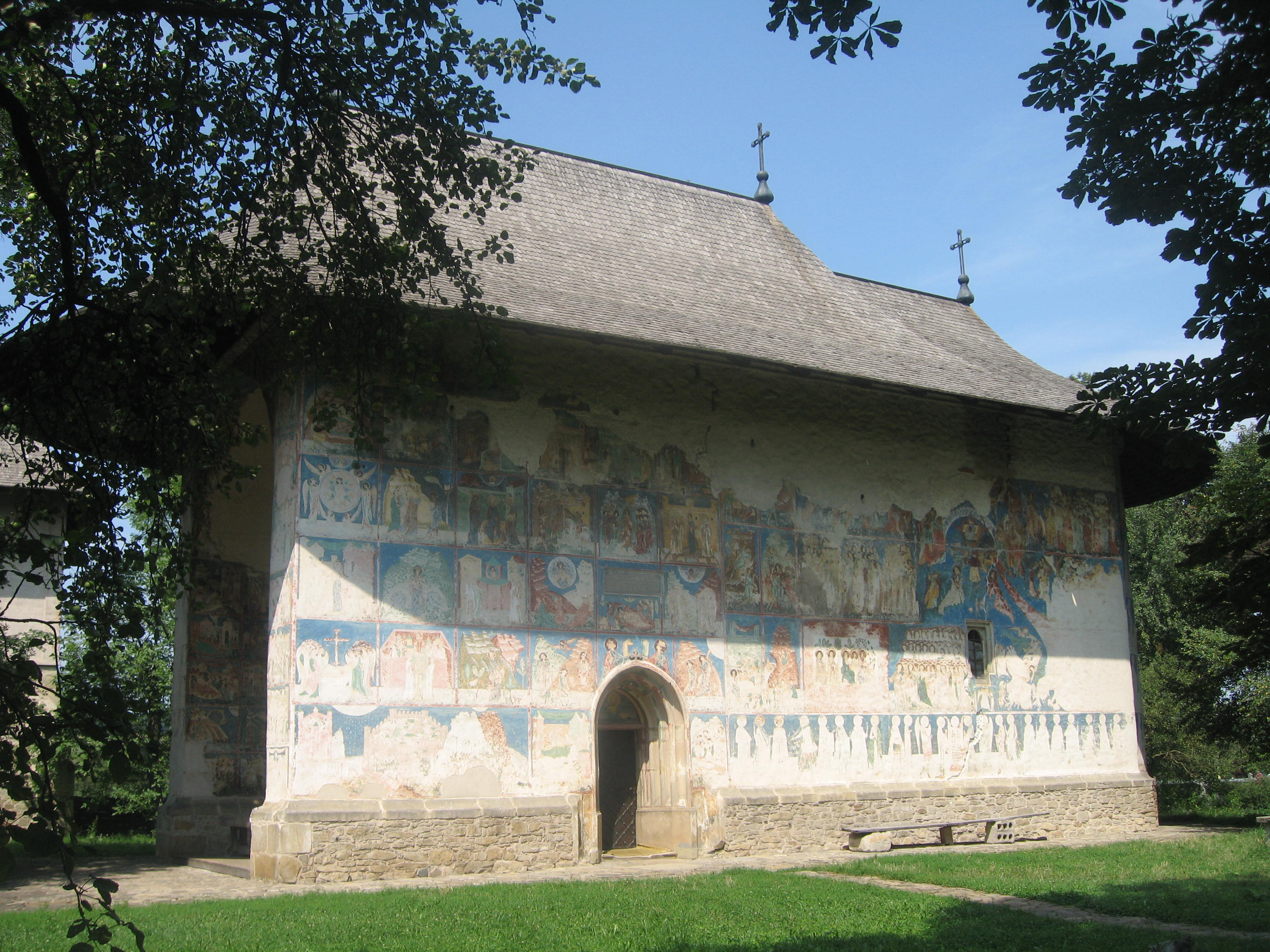
- Arbore Church

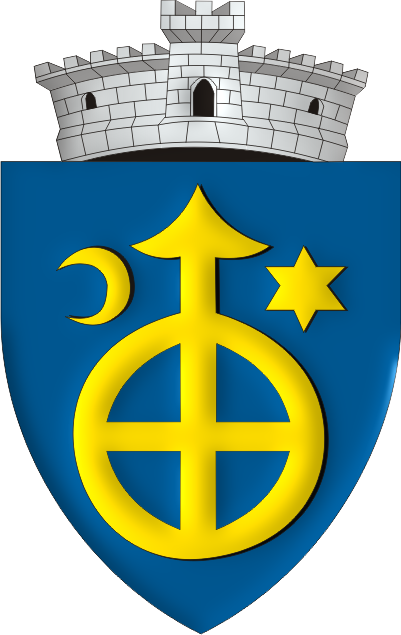
- Coat of arms

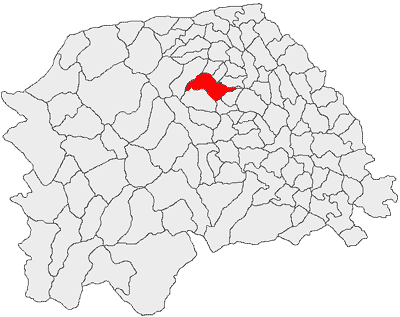
- Location in Suceava County

- Location in Romania
- Coordinates: 47°44′N 25°56′E
- Country: Romania
- County: Suceava

Government
  - Mayor (2020–2024): Dan Tiperciuc (PSD)
- Area: 66.1 km^{2} (25.5 sq mi)
- Elevation: 369 m (1,211 ft)
- Population (2021-12-01): 6,887
  - Density: 104/km^{2} (270/sq mi)
- Time zone: UTC+02:00 (EET)
  - Summer (DST): UTC+03:00 (EEST)
- Postal code: 727015
- Vehicle reg.: SV
- Website: primariarbore.ro

Arbore (German: Deutsch-Arbora or Arbora) is a commune located in Suceava County, Bukovina, northeastern Romania. It is composed of three villages: namely Arbore, Bodnăreni, and Clit (German: Glitt).

The commune is located in the central-north part of the county, 37 km (23 mi) northwest of the county seat, Suceava. It lies on the banks of the river Solca, whose tributary, the Saca, flows into the Solca in Arbore.

== History ==
Historical affiliations
- Moldavia (1388–1775)
- Habsburg Monarchy (1775–1804)
- Austrian Empire (1804–1867)
- Austria-Hungary, Cisleithania (1867–1918)
- Kingdom of Romania (1918–1947)
- Romanian People's Republic (1947–1965)
- Socialist Republic of Romania (1965–1989)
- Romania (1989–present)

Starting in the late 18th century under the Habsburg monarchy and ending in the mid-20th century, Arbore was inhabited by a sizable community of Bukovina Germans.

== Natives ==
- Gheorghe Cozorici (1933–1993), actor
- Radu Mironovici (1899–1979), a founding member of the Legionary Movement

== Gallery ==
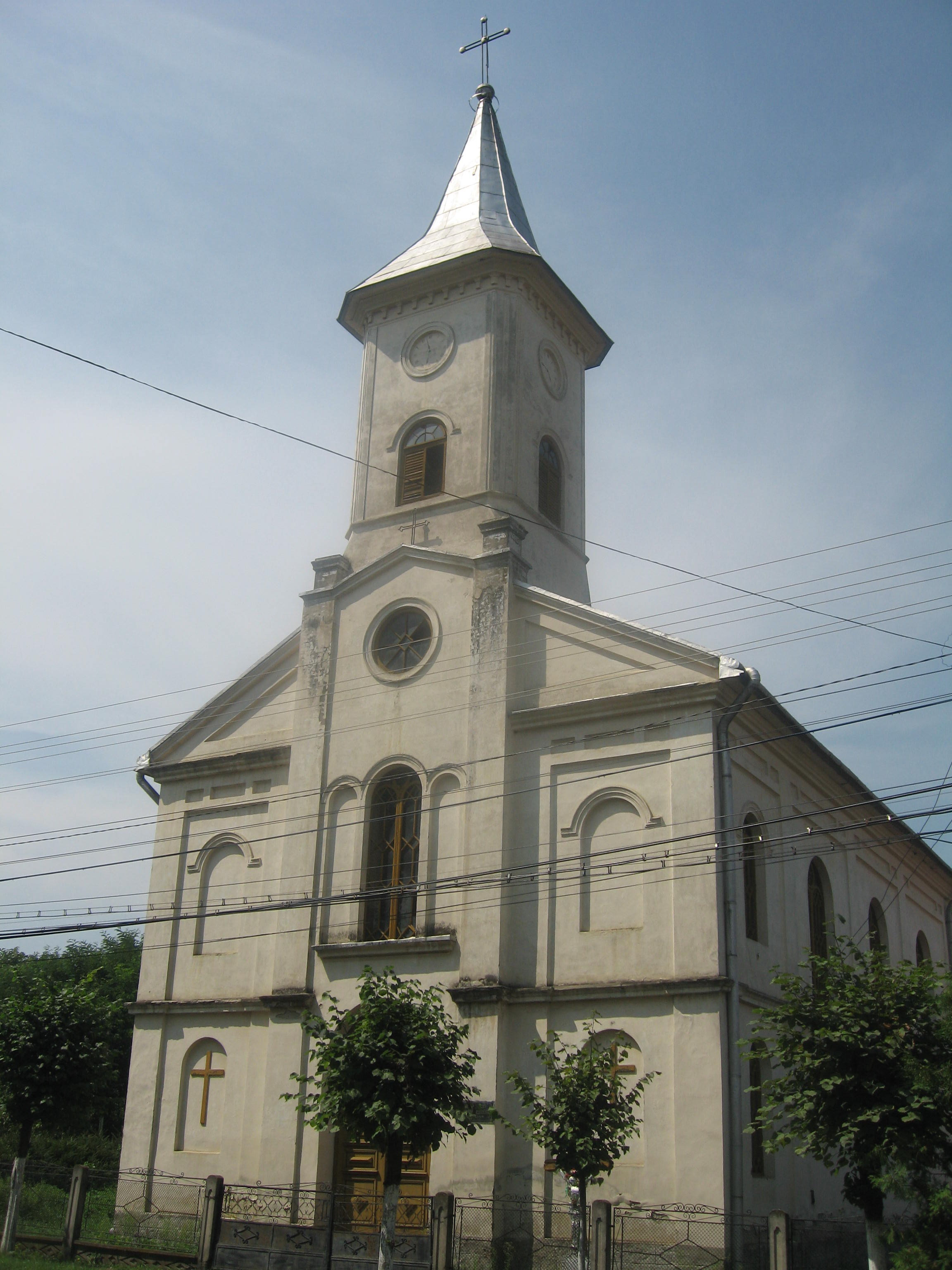
Roman Catholic church

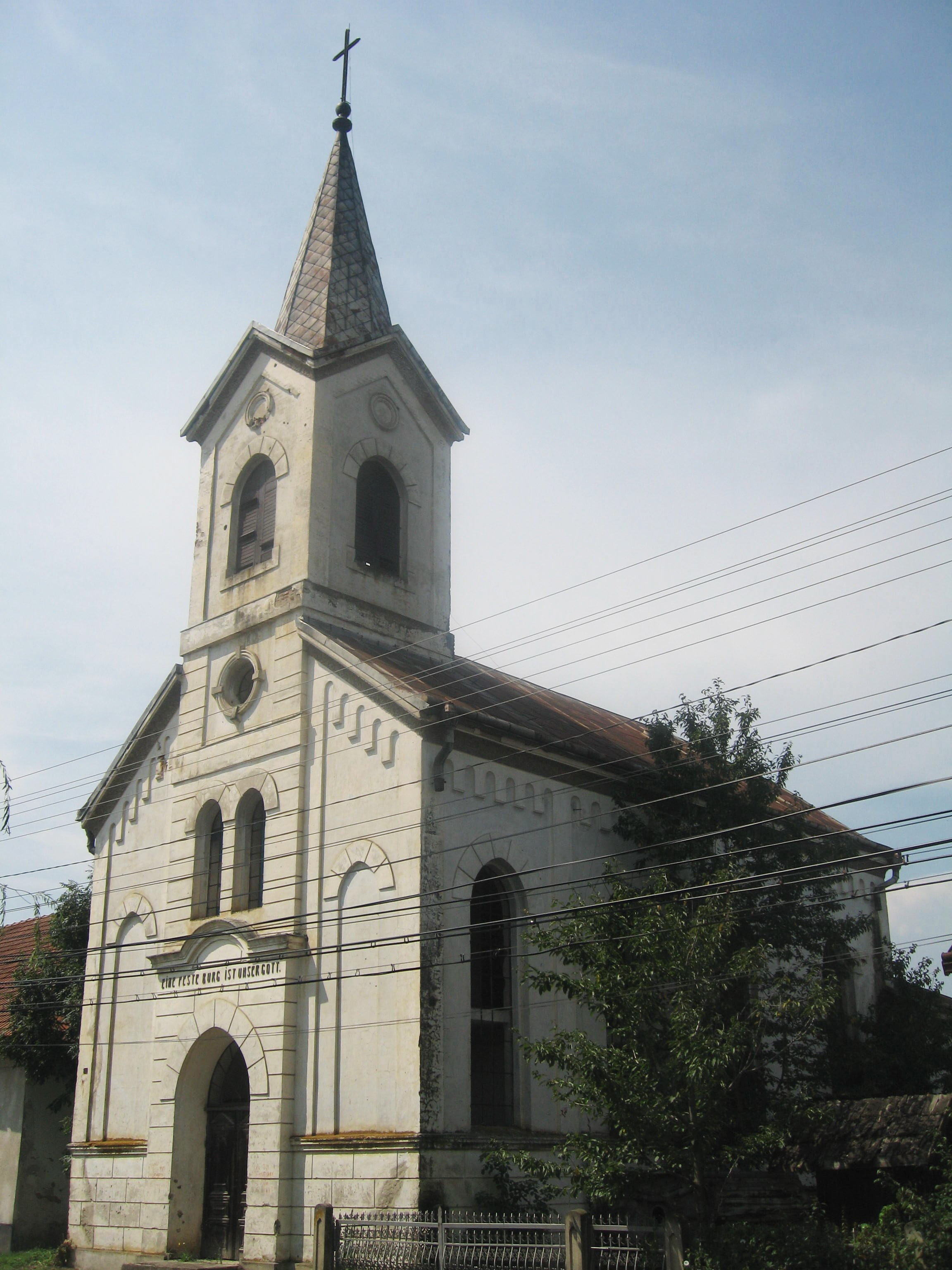
Evangelical Lutheran church

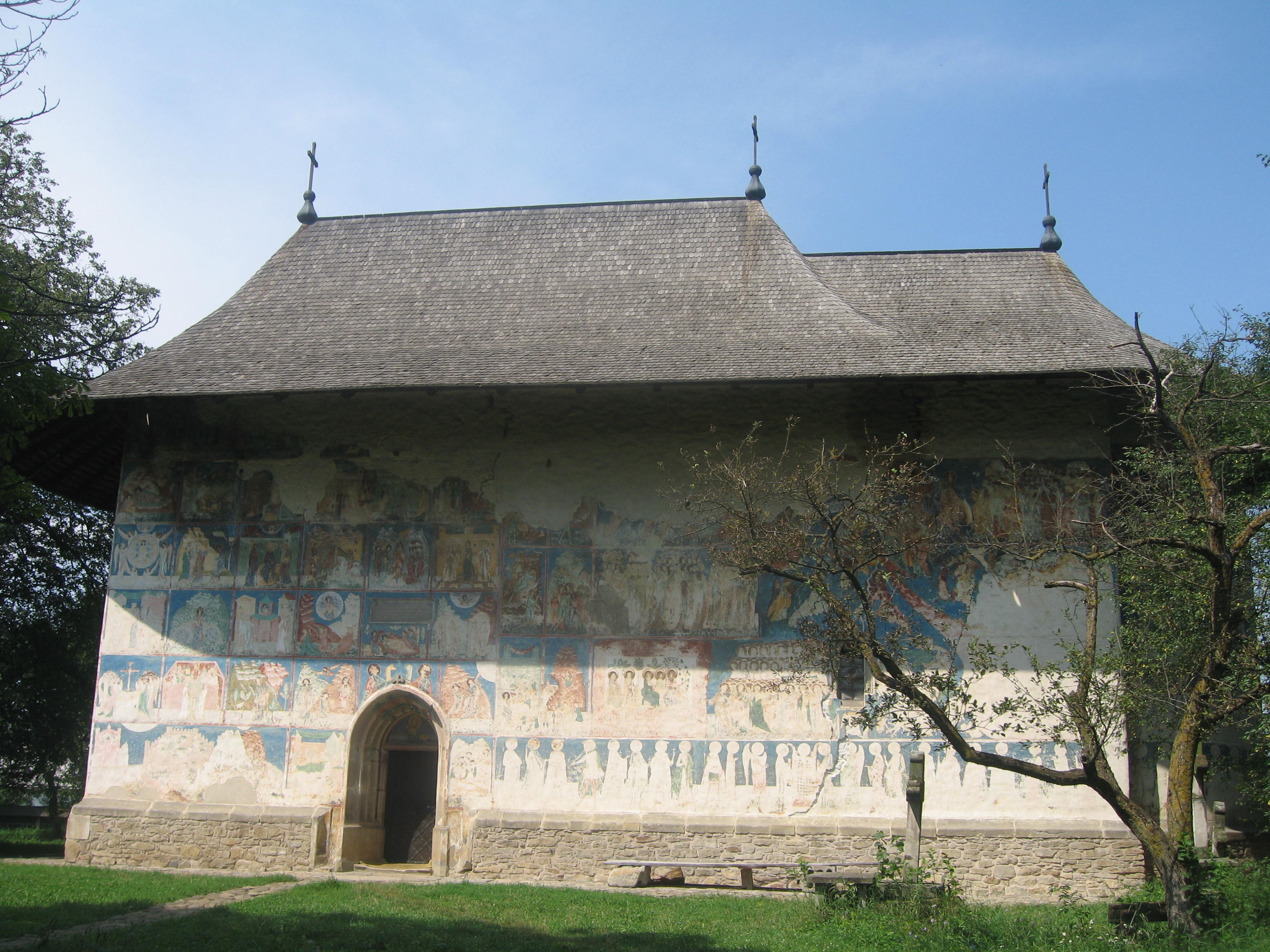
Arbore Orthodox church
