= Iaslovăț (river) =

- Location within Romania

Location
- Country: Romania
- Counties: Suceava County
- Villages: Iaslovăț

Physical characteristics
- Mouth: Solca
  - coordinates: 47.7462°N 26.0133°E
- Length: 20 km (12 mi)
- Basin size: 43 km^{2} (17 sq mi)

Basin features
- Progression: Solca→ Suceava→ Siret→ Danube→ Black Sea

The Iaslovăț is a left tributary of the river Solca in Romania. It flows into the Solca near the village Iaslovăț. Its length is 20 km (12 mi) and its basin size is 43 km^{2} (17 sq mi).
