= Saca (river) =

Tributary of the Solca in Romania

- Location within Romania

Location
- Country: Romania
- Counties: Suceava County

Physical characteristics
- Mouth: Solca
  - location: Arbore
  - coordinates: 47.7339°N 25.9424°E
- Length: 15 km (9.3 mi)
- Basin size: 36 km^{2} (14 sq mi)

Basin features
- Progression: Solca→ Suceava→ Siret→ Danube→ Black Sea
- Tributaries
  - left: Clit

The Saca is a left tributary of the river Solca in Romania. It flows into the Solca in Arbore. Its length is 15 km (9.3 mi) and its basin size is 36 km^{2} (14 sq mi).
