= Bukovina =

Historical region split between Romania and Ukraine

Bucovina (Romanian)
Bukovyna/Буковина (Ukrainian)
In other languages
- - Yiddish: Bukowine/בוקאָווינע
  - Polish: Bukowina
  - German: Buchenland/Bukowina
- Flag Coat of arms

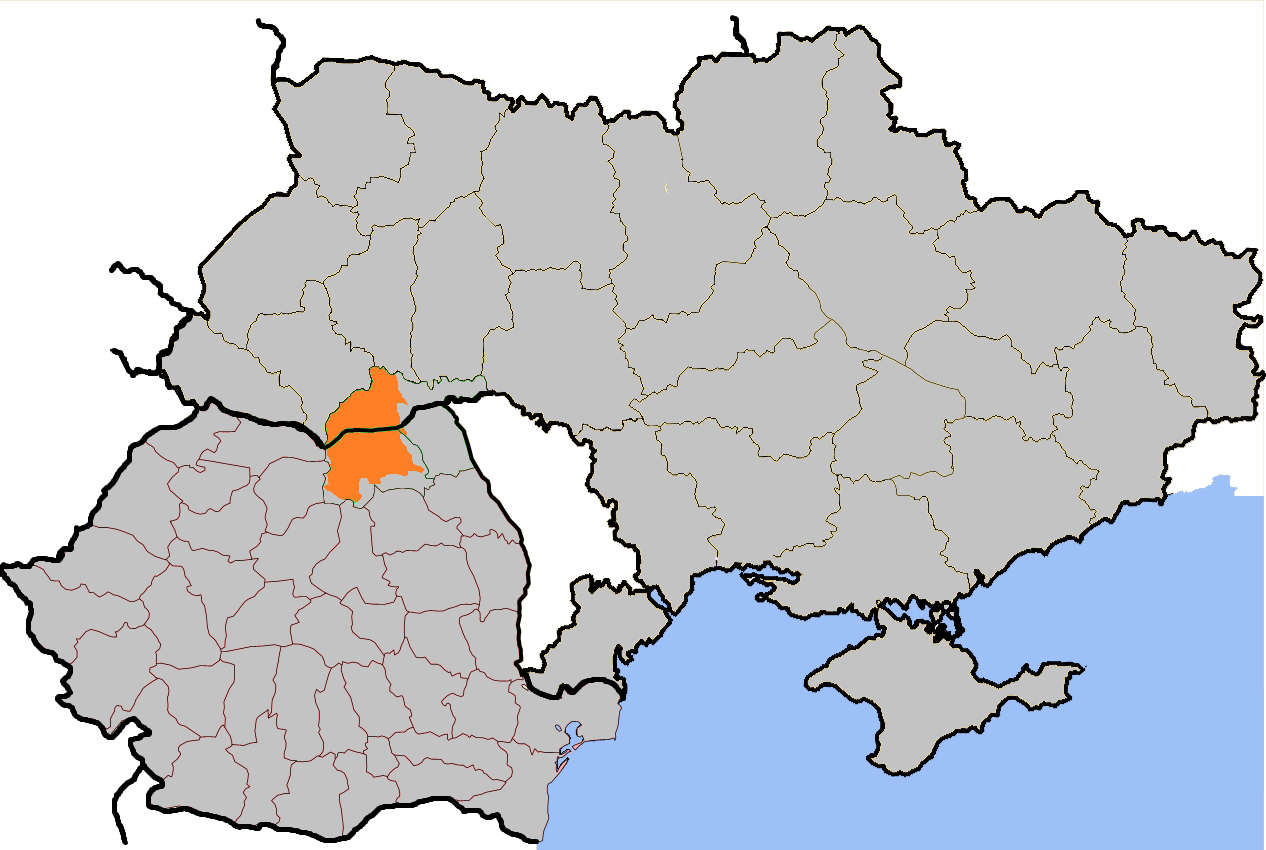
- Bukovina in Romania and Ukraine

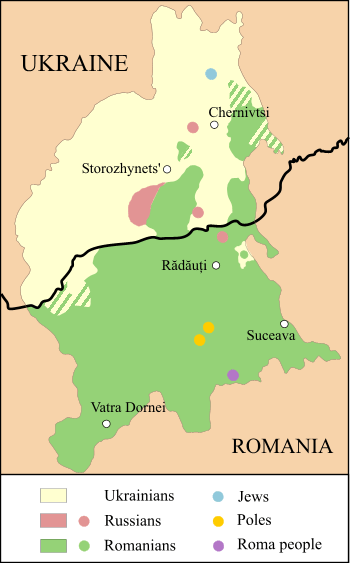
- Ethnic divisions in modern Bukovina with Ukrainian, Romanian and Russian areas depicted in light yellow, green, and red respectively. The Moldovans, counted separately in the 2001 Ukrainian census, are included in this map as Romanians.
- Largest city: Chernivtsi
- Official languages: Romanian; Ukrainian
- Demonym: Bukovinian

Area
  - Total: 10,442 km^{2} (4,032 sq mi)

Population
  - Estimate: 1,380,800
- Currency: Romanian leu (RON); Ukrainian hryvnia (UAH)
- Time zone: UTC+2 (EET)
  - Summer (DST): UTC+3 (EEST)
- Date format: dd.mm.yyyy (AD)
- Calling code: +40 +380
- Internet TLD: .ro; .ua; .укр

Bukovina (Note: Romanian: Bucovina; Ukrainian: Буковина, romanized: Bukovyna, IPA: [bʊkoˈwɪnɐ]; German: Bukowina or Buchenland; see also other languages.) is a historical region at the crossroads of Central and Eastern Europe. It is located on the northern slopes of the central Eastern Carpathians and the adjoining plains, today divided between Romania and Ukraine. It is inhabited mainly by Romanians (in southern regions) and Ukrainians (in northern regions).

Settled throughout history by various cultures and peoples, it became part of the Kievan Rus' in the 10th century, but the region was also affected by Pechenegs and Cumans. Consequently, the culture of the Kievan Rus' spread in the region, that belonged to the Principality of Halych. During the time of the Golden Horde, namely in the 14th century, Bukovina became part of the Principality of Moldavia, that was under the suzerainty of the medieval Kingdom of Hungary. In that region, the capital of Moldavia, Suceava, was founded.

According to the Moldo-Russian Chronicle, the Hungarian king Vladislav (Ladislaus) asked the Old Romans (i.e. Byzantines) and the New Romans (i.e. Vlachs) to fight the Tatars. During the same event, it writes that Dragoș was one of the New Romans. Eventually, Dragoș dismounted Moldavia named from a river (Moldova River) flowing in Bukovina. During a Vlach revolt in Bukovina against Balc, Dragoș's grandson, Bogdan the Founder joined the revolt and deposed Balc, securing independence from the Kingdom of Hungary. In 1497, at the Battle of the Cosmin Forest, Stephen III of Moldavia defeated the much-stronger but demoralized army of King John I Albert of Poland. The battle is known in Polish popular culture as "the battle when the Knights have perished".

After the Russo-Ottoman Treaty of Küçük Kaynarca (21 July 1774), the Habsburg Monarchy captured the region in October 1774. Under the Austro-Ottoman Convention of Pera (7 May 1775), the region that came to be known as Bukovina was officially ceded to the Habsburgs. From 1775 to 1786 it was organized as a distinctive Bukovina District, that was included into the Kingdom of Galicia and Lodomeria (1786–1849) and later became the Duchy of Bukovina (1849–1918).

The first census that recorded ethnicity was made in 1851 and shows a population of 184,718 or 48.5% Romanians, 144,982 or 38.1% Ukrainians and 51,126 or 13.4% others, with a total population of 380,826 people. By 1910, Romanians were 34% and Ukrainians were 42% with the Romanians concentrated mainly in the south and south-east and the Ukrainians mainly in the north and west. By 1930, following the Kingdom of Romania's acquisition of Bukovina, the region had a total population of 839,500. The region's ethnic composition was approximately 368,500 or 43% Romanian, 235,800 or 28% Ukrainian, 91,100 or 11% Jewish, 75,000 or 9% German, 30,500 or 3.6% Polish, 12,400 or 1.5% Hutsul, and 11,800 or 1.4% Hungarian, with the remainder consisting of Russians, Romani, and other ethnic groups.

In the summer of 1940, the northern half of Bukovina was annexed by the Soviet Union in violation of the Molotov–Ribbentrop Pact, a non-aggression pact between Nazi Germany and the Soviet Union. On 13 November 1940, Vyacheslav Molotov asked Adolf Hitler to endorse the Soviet annexation of South Bukovina as well. However, by that time, Romania was under a territorial guarantee from the Axis following the Second Vienna Award, so Germany refused. As the Final Report of the Wiesel Commission put it: "Only Hitler's refusal saved the rest of Bukovina from being swallowed up, Russified, and lost to Romania forever." Northern Bukovina was temporarily recovered by Romania as an ally of Nazi Germany after the latter invaded the Soviet Union in 1941, but retaken by the Soviet army in 1944. Bukovina's population was historically ethnically diverse. Today, Bukovina's northern half is the Chernivtsi Oblast of Ukraine, while the southern part is Suceava County of Romania. Bukovina is sometimes known as the 'Switzerland of the East', given its diverse ethnic mosaic and deep forested mountainous landscapes.

== Name ==
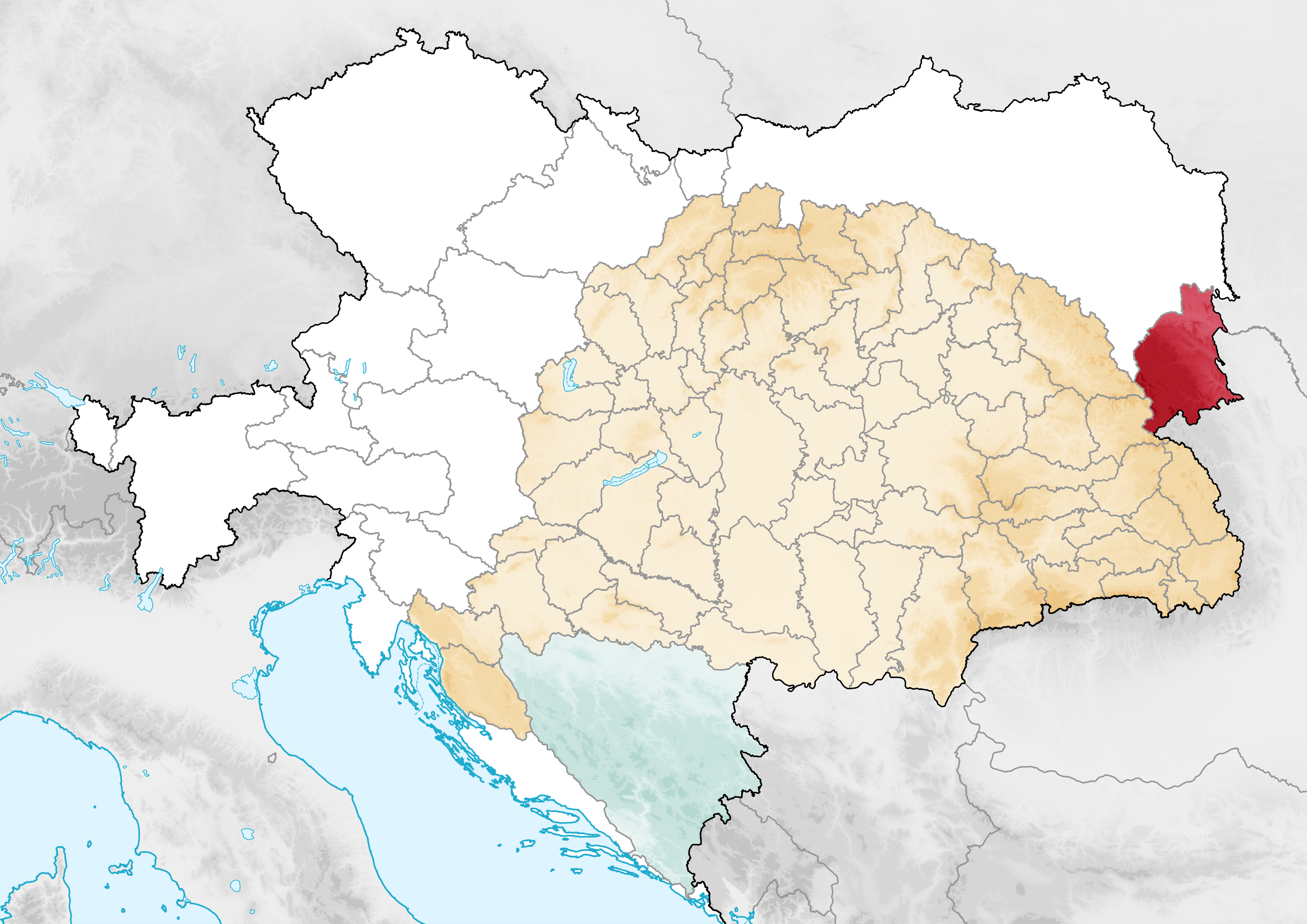
Map of Austria-Hungary depicting the Duchy of Bukovina, as part of Cisleithania in 1914.

The name first appears in a document issued by the Voivode of Moldavia Roman I Mușat on 30 March 1392, by which he gives to Ionaș Viteazul three villages, located near the Siret river.

The name Bukovina came into official use in 1775 with the region's annexation from the Principality of Moldavia to the possessions of the Habsburg monarchy, which became the Austrian Empire in 1804, and Austria-Hungary in 1867.

The official German name of the province under Austrian rule (1775–1918), die Bukowina, was derived from the Polish form Bukowina, which in turn was derived from the common Slavic form of buk, meaning beech tree (compare Ukrainian бук [buk]; German Buche; Hungarian bükkfa). Another German name for the region, das Buchenland, is mostly used in poetry, and means 'beech land', or 'the land of beech trees'. In Romanian, in literary or poetic contexts, the name Țara Fagilor ('the land of beech trees') is sometimes used. Often a definite article is used before the name in English also: the Bukovina.

In Ukraine, the name Буковина (Bukovyna) is unofficial, but is common when referring to the Chernivtsi Oblast, as over two-thirds of the oblast is the northern part of Bukovina. In Romania, the term Northern Bukovina is sometimes synonymous with the entire Chernivtsi Oblast of Ukraine, while Southern Bukovina refers to the Suceava County of Romania (although 30% of the present-day Suceava County covers territory outside of the historical Bukovina).

== History ==
The territory of Bukovina had been part of Kievan Rus' since the 10th century. It then became part of the Principality of Galicia, and then part of Moldavia in the 14th century. It was first delineated as a separate district of the Kingdom of Galicia and Lodomeria in 1775, and was made a nominal duchy within the Austrian Empire in 1849.

=== Background ===
The region, which is made up of a portion of the northeastern Carpathian Mountains and the neighbouring plain, was settled by both Vlachs and Ruthenians. After being inhabited by ancient peoples and tribes (Trypillian, Scythians, Dacians, Getae) starting from the Paleolithic, Germanic culture and language emerged in the region in the 4th century by the time of the Goths, archeological research has also indicated that the Romans had a presence in the region. Later, Slavic culture spread, and by the 10th century the region was part of Turkic, Slavic and Romance people like Pechenegs, Cumans, Ruthinians and Vlachs. Among the first references of the Vlachs (Romanians) in the region is in the 10th century by Varangian Sagas referring to the Blakumen people i.e. Vlachs in the land of Pechenegs. By late 12th century chronicle of Niketas Choniates, writes that some Vlachs seized the future Byzantine emperor, Andronikos Komnenos, when "he reached the borders of Halych" in 1164. In the Moldo-Russian Chronicle, writes the events of year 1342, that the Hungarian king Vladislav (Ladislaus) asked the Old Romans and the New Romans to fight the Tatars, by that they will earn a sit in Maramureș. During the same event, it writes that Dragoș was one of the Romans . In the year 1359 Dragoș dismounted Moldavia and took with him many Vlachs and German colonists from Maramureș to Moldavia.

=== Early settlement ===
First traces of human occupation date back to the Paleolithic. The area was first settled by Trypillian culture tribes, in the Neolithic. It was then settled by now extinct tribes (Dacians/Getae, Thracian/Scythian tribes). Meanwhile, many nomads crossed the region (3rd to 9th century A.D). By the 4th century, the Goths appeared in the region. And later by the 5th and 6th century Slavic people appeared in the region. They were part of the tribal alliance of the Antes. In the 9th century Tivertsi and White Croatians and Cowari composed the local population.

=== Kievan Rus ===
Principalities of Kievan Rus', Principality of Halych in magenta

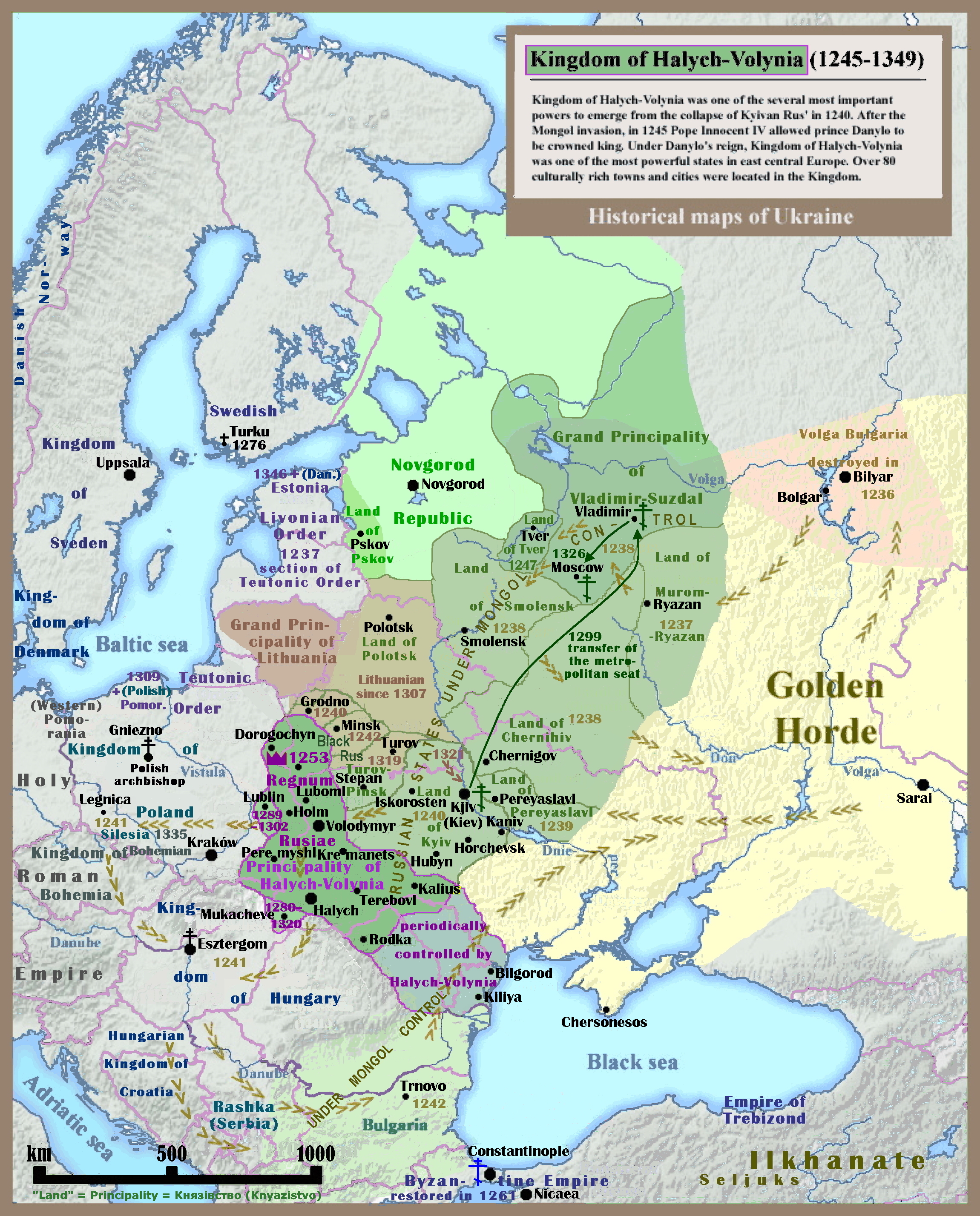
Galicia–Volhynia state

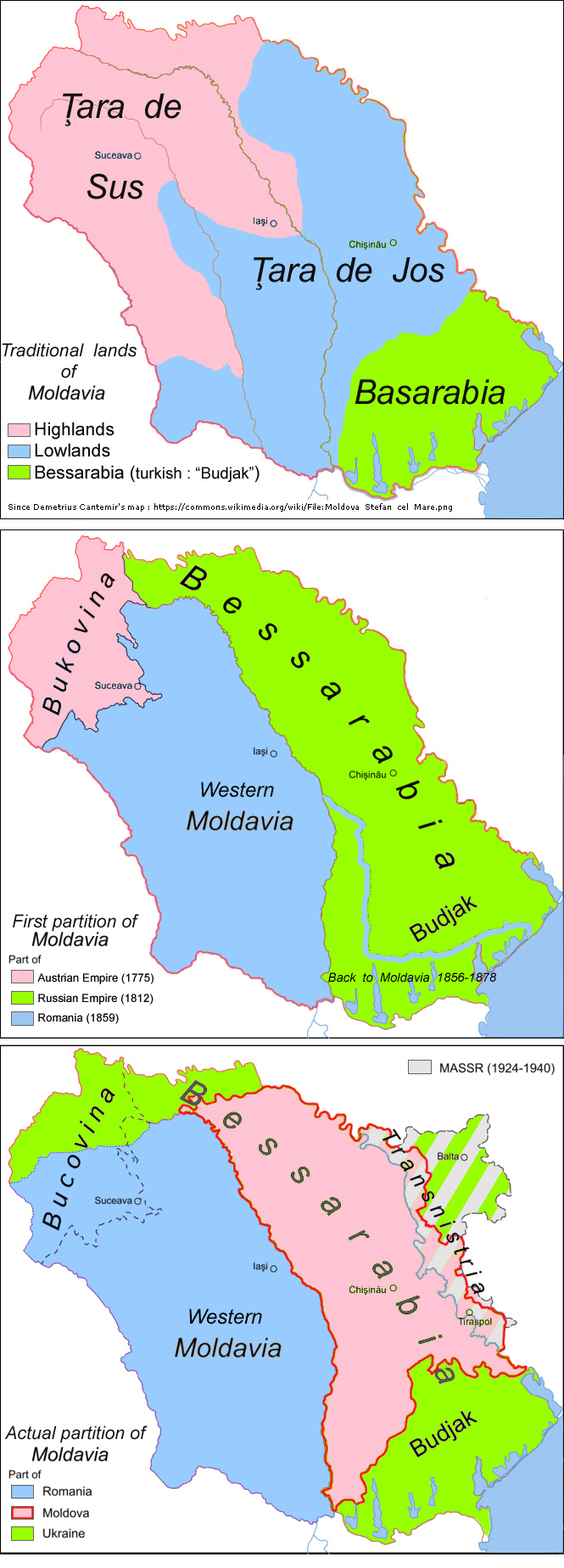
Bukovina within the historical region of Moldavia over the passing of time.

According to the Russian and Ukrainian historians, Bukovina is an "ancient Slavic land".

United by Prince Oleg in the 870s, Kievan Rus' was a loose federation of speakers of East Slavic and Uralic languages from the late 9th to the mid-13th century, under the reign of the Rurik dynasty, founded by the Varangian prince Rurik. Bukovina gradually became part of Kievan Rus' from the late 10th century and Pechenegs. Parts of Bukovina were first conquered in 981 by Vladimir the Great. The rest was incorporated into the Principality of Terebovlia in 1084. When Kievan Rus' was partitioned at the end of the 11th century, Bukovina became part of the Principality of Galicia-Volhynia.

=== Principality of Galicia–Volhynia ===
After the fragmentation of Kievan Rus', Bukovina passed to the Principality of Galicia (Principality of Galicia-Volhynia) in 1124. The Church in Bukovina was initially administered from Kiev. In 1302, it was passed to the Halych metropoly.

After the Mongols under Batu invaded Europe, with the region nominally falling into their hands, ties between Galician-Volhynian and Bukovina weakened. As a result of the Mongol invasion, the Shypyntsi land, recognizing the suzerainty of the Mongols, arose in the region.

Eventually, this state collapsed, and Bukovina passed to Hungary. King Louis I appointed Dragoș, Voivode of Moldavia as his deputy, facilitating the migration of the Romanians from Maramureș and Transylvania.

The Moldavian state was formed by the mid-14th century, eventually expanding its territory all the way to the Black Sea. Upon its foundation, the Moldavian or Moldovan state recognized the supremacy of Poland, keeping on recognizing it from 1387 to 1497. Later (1514) it was vassalized by the Ottoman Empire. Bukovina and neighboring regions became the nucleus of the Moldavian Principality, with the capital successively moving from Baia, to Siret, Suceava, and finally in 1564 to Iași, where it would remain until the end of the principality's history. The name of Moldavia (Romanian: Moldova) is derived from the Moldova River in Bukovina.

=== Polish and Moldavian period ===
Petru II moved the seat of Moldova from Siret to Suceava in 1388. In the 15th century, Pokuttya, the region immediately to the north, became the subject of disputes between the Principality of Moldavia and the Polish Kingdom. Pokuttya was inhabited by Ruthenians (the predecessors of modern Ukrainians together with the Rus', and of the Rusyns). In 1497 a battle took place at the Cosmin Forest (the hilly forests separating Chernivtsi and Siret valleys), at which Stephen III of Moldavia (Stephen the Great), managed to defeat the much-stronger but demoralized army of King John I Albert of Poland. The battle is known in Polish popular culture as "the battle when the Knights have perished". The region had been under Polish nominal suzerainty from its foundation (1387) to the time of this battle (1497). Shortly thereafter, it became a vassal of the Ottoman Empire (1514).

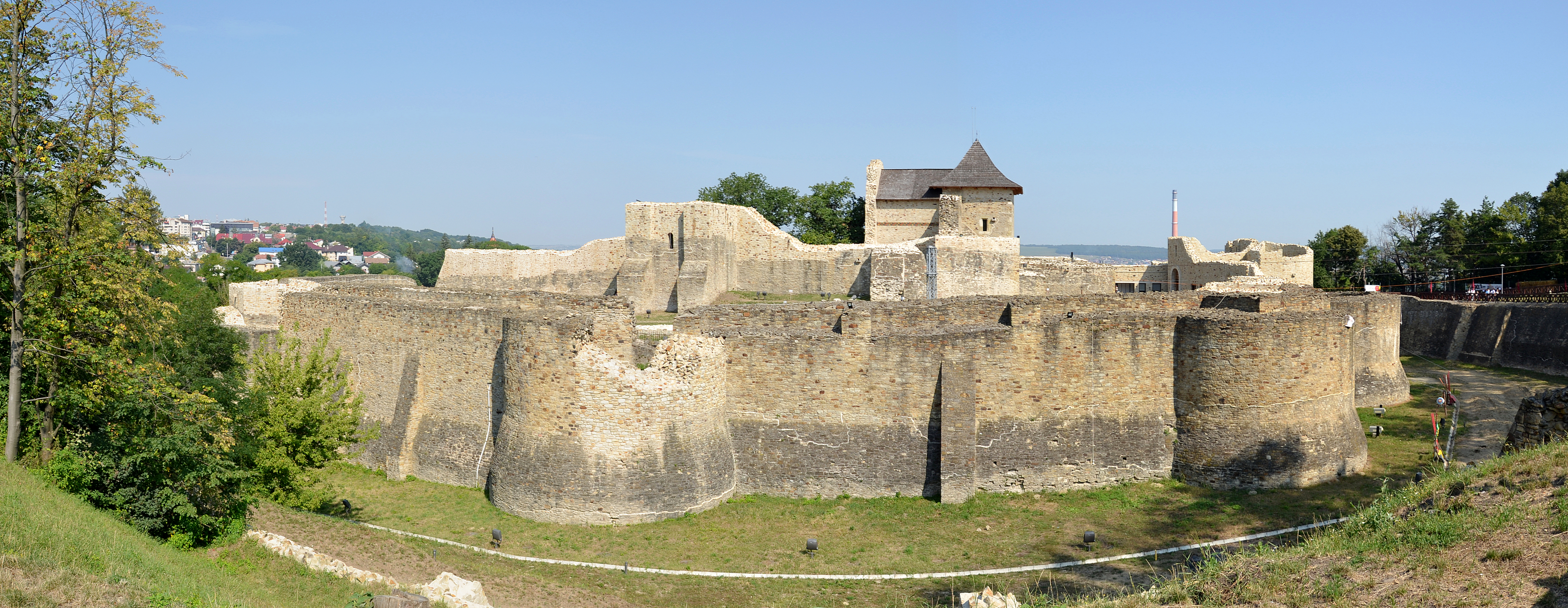
Medieval Seat Fortress of Suceava

In this period, the patronage of Stephen the Great and his successors on the throne of Moldavia saw the construction of the famous painted monasteries of Moldovița, Sucevița, Putna, Humor, Voroneț, Dragomirna, Arbore and others. With their renowned exterior frescoes, these monasteries remain some of the greatest cultural treasures of Romania; some of them are World Heritage Sites, part of the painted churches of northern Moldavia. The most famous monasteries are in the area of Suceava, which today is part of Romania. Also part of Romania is the monastery of John the New, an Orthodox saint and martyr, who was killed by the Tatars in Bilhorod-Dnistrovskyi.

From 1490 to 1492, the Mukha rebellion, led by the Ukrainian hero Petro Mukha, took place in Galicia. This event pitted the Moldavians against the oppressive rule of the Polish magnates. A rebel army composed of Moldavian peasants took the fortified towns of Sniatyn, Kolomyia, and Halych, killing many Polish noblemen and burghers, before being halted by the Polish Royal Army in alliance with a Galician levée en masse and Prussian mercenaries while marching to Lviv. Many rebels died in the Rohatyn Battle, with Mukha and the survivors fleeing back to Moldavia. Mukha returned to Galicia to re-ignite the rebellion, but was killed in 1492.

In May 1600 Mihai Viteazul (Michael the Brave), became the ruler the two Danubian principalities and Transylvania.

In the 16th and 17th centuries, Ukrainian warriors (Cossacks) were involved in many conflicts against the Turkish and Tatar invaders of the Moldavian territory. Notably, Ivan Pidkova, best known as the subject of Ukraine's bard Taras Shevchenko's Ivan Pidkova (1840), led military campaigns in the 1570s. Many Bukovinians joined the Cossacks during the Khmelnytsky uprising. As part of the peasant armies, they formed their own regiment, which participated to the 1648 siege of Lviv. Ukrainian Hetman Bohdan Khmelnytsky himself led a campaign in Moldavia, whose result was an alliance between Khmelnytsky and its hospodar Vasile Lupu. Other prominent Ukrainian leaders fighting against the Turks in Moldovia were Severyn Nalyvaiko and Petro Konashevych-Sahaidachny.

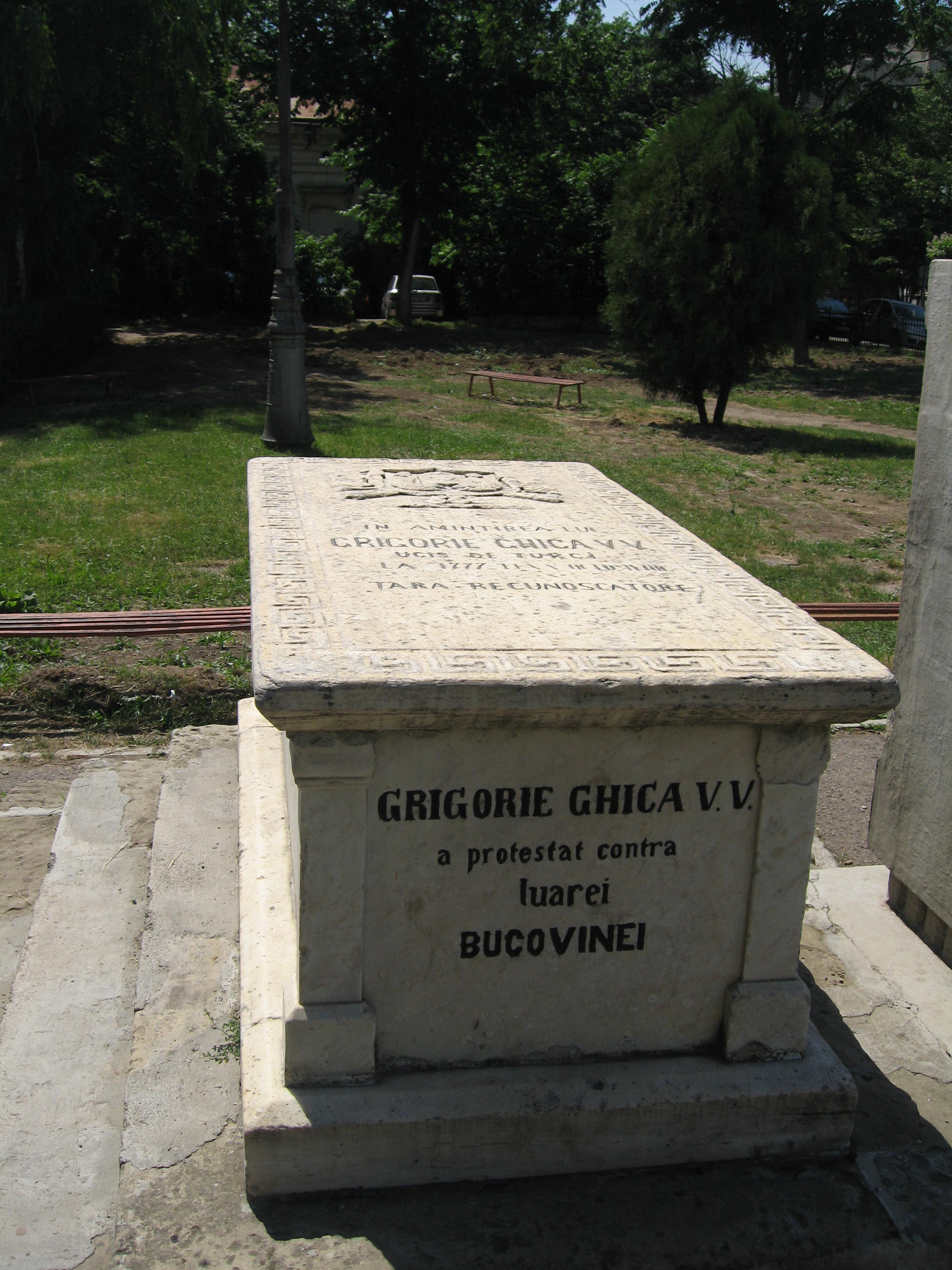
Monument in Iași (1875) dedicated to Grigore III Ghica and Moldavia's loss of Bukovina.

For short periods of time (during wars), the Polish Kingdom (to which Moldavians were hostile) again occupied parts of northern Moldavia. However, the old border was re-established each time, as for example on 14 October 1703 the Polish delegate Martin Chometowski said, according to the Polish protocol, "Between us and Wallachia (i.e. the Moldavian region, vassal of the Turks) God himself set Dniester as the border" (Inter nos et Valachiam ipse Deus flumine Tyras dislimitavit). According to the Turkish protocol the sentence reads, "God (may He be exalted) has separated the lands of Moldavia [Bukovina, vassal of the Turks] from our Polish lands by the river Dniester." Strikingly similar sentences were used in other sayings and folkloristic anecdotes, such as the phrase reportedly exclaimed by a member of the Aragonese Cortes in 1684.

=== Habsburg Bukovina ===
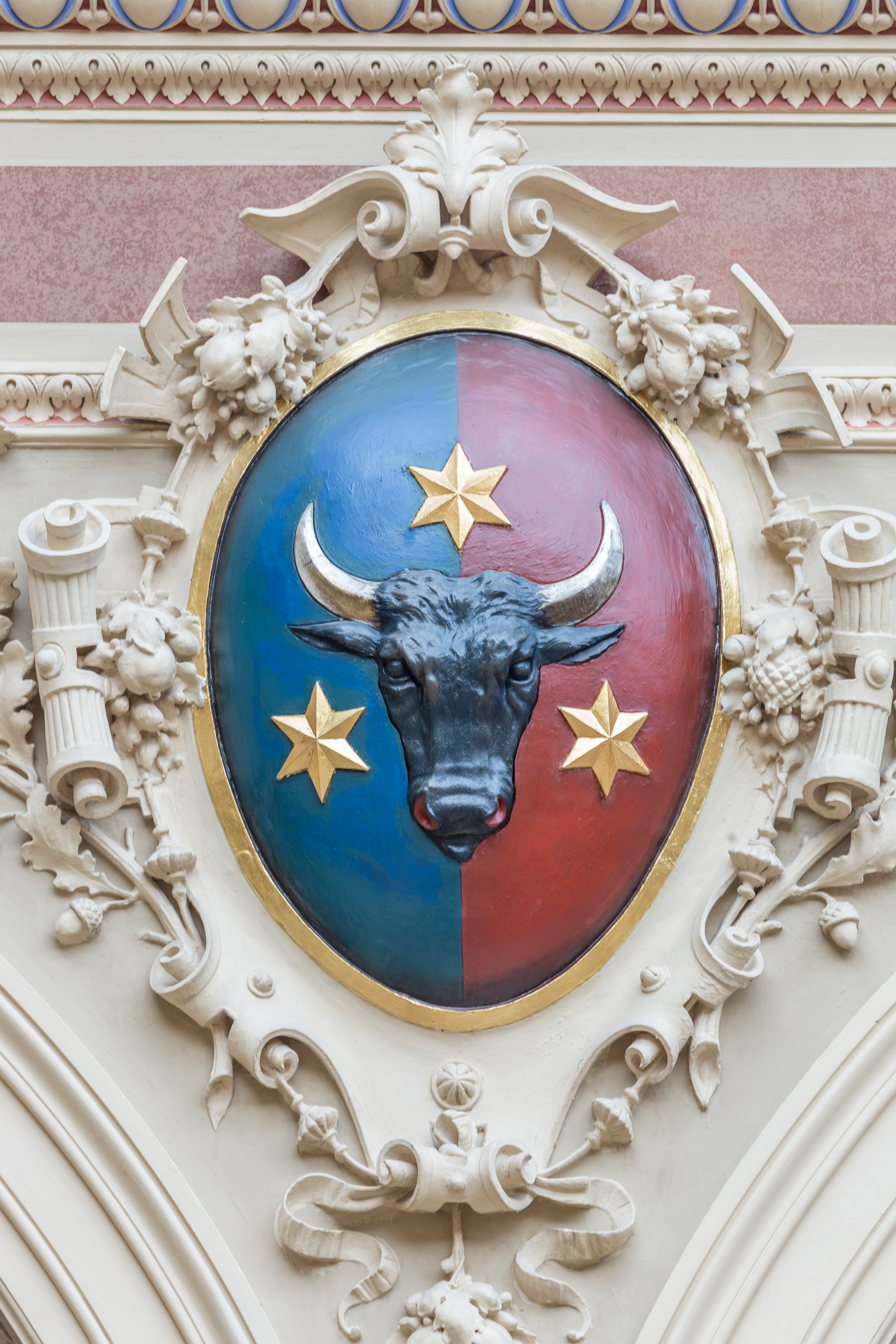
The coat of arms of Bukovina, a constituent country of the Imperial Austrian Council, depicted at the Assembly Hall in the Viennese Justice Palace.

During the Russo-Turkish War (1768–1774), the Ottoman armies were defeated by the Russian Empire, and the Principality of Moldavia was temporarily possessed by Russian forces, from the autumn 1769 to September 1774. Already before the Treaty of Küçük Kaynarca (21 July 1774), the non-belligerent Habsburg Monarchy was already planning to occupy north-western regions of Moldavia, claiming the need for a road between Galicia and Transylvania and thus, while Russian armies were retreating upon the conclusion of the peace treaty.

On 31 August 1774, the first Austrian units entered northern Moldova. By 25 October 1774, they had occupied the Chernivtsi region, 142 villages in the Suceava region, and nine localities in the northwestern part of the Hotin raya. On 7 May 1775, an Austro-Ottoman convention was signed in Istanbul, through which the Ottoman Empire ceded Bukovina to Austria. An explanatory convention was signed on 12 May 1775. Subsequently, a mixed Austro-Ottoman commission was created to demarcate the newborder, a process that lasted until June 1776. The Austrians were forced to give up some territories, including villages in the Hotin raya. The Moldavians attempted to preserve the old capitals of Moldova, Suceava and Siret, but these cities were annexed by the Habsburg Empire. On 2 July 1776, the convention definitively establishing the border of Bukovina was signed in Balamutca. The Habsburg Empire occupied the cities of Chernivtsi, Siret, and Suceava, along with 226 villages and 52 hamlets in northwestern Moldova. As a result, the Romanians in this part of Moldova were separated from the rest of the country and, for 144 years, were subjected to denationalization processes, including the imposition of the German language, especially in cities, eventually becoming an ethnic minority.

Prince Grigore III Ghica of Moldavia protested and was prepared to take action to recover the territory, but was assassinated, and a Greek-Phanariot foreigner was put on the throne of Moldavia by the Ottomans.

Bukovina was a closed military district (1775–1786), then the largest district, Bukovina District (first known as the Czernowitz District), of the Austrian constituent Kingdom of Galicia and Lodomeria (1787–1849). On 4 March 1849, Bukovina became a separate Austrian Kronland 'crown land' under a Landespräsident (not a Statthalter, as in other crown lands) and was declared the Duchy of Bukovina Herzogtum Bukowina (a nominal duchy, as part of the official full style of the Austrian Emperors). In 1860 it was again amalgamated with Galicia but reinstated as a separate province once again on 26 February 1861, a status that would last until 1918.

In 1849 Bukovina got a representative assembly, the Landtag (diet). The Moldavian nobility had traditionally formed the ruling class in that territory. In 1867, with the re-organization of the Austrian Empire as the Austro-Hungarian Empire, it became part of the Cisleithanian or Austrian territories of Austria-Hungary and remained so until 1918.

==== Late 19th to early 20th centuries ====
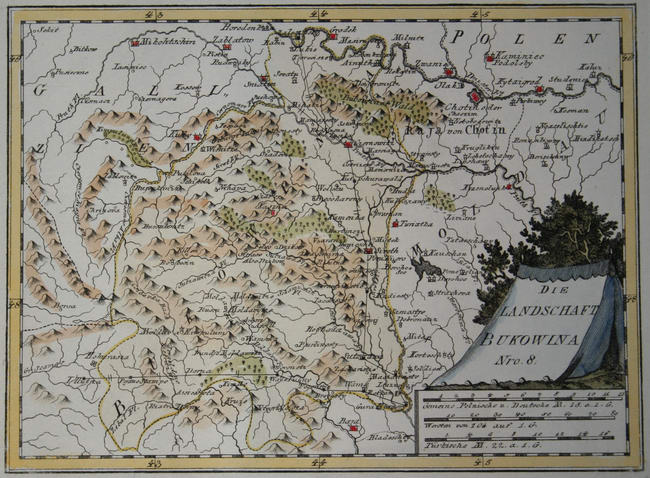
Topographic map of Bukovina, also with settlement place names, as depicted in 1791.

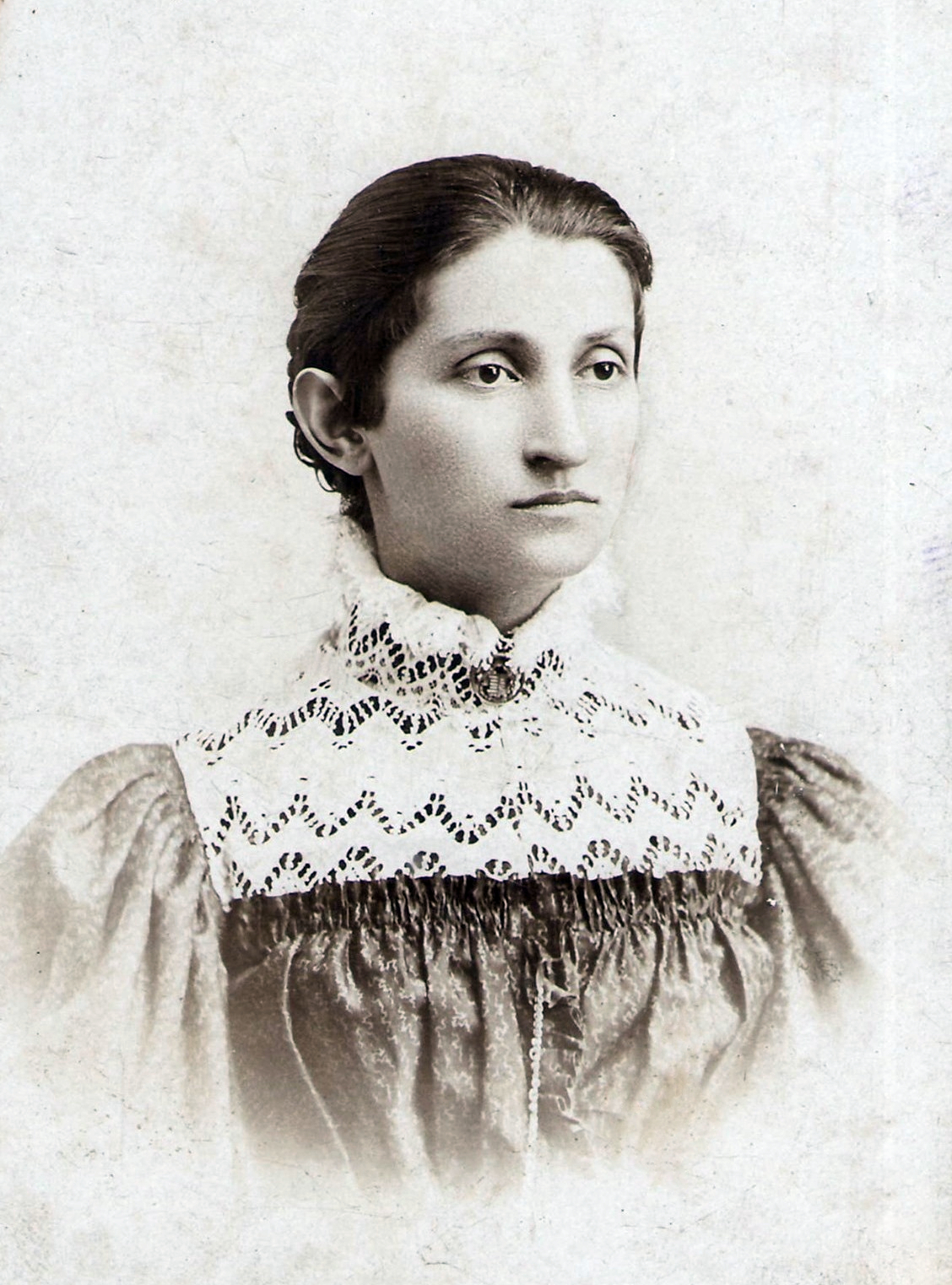
Olha Kobylianska, 1882

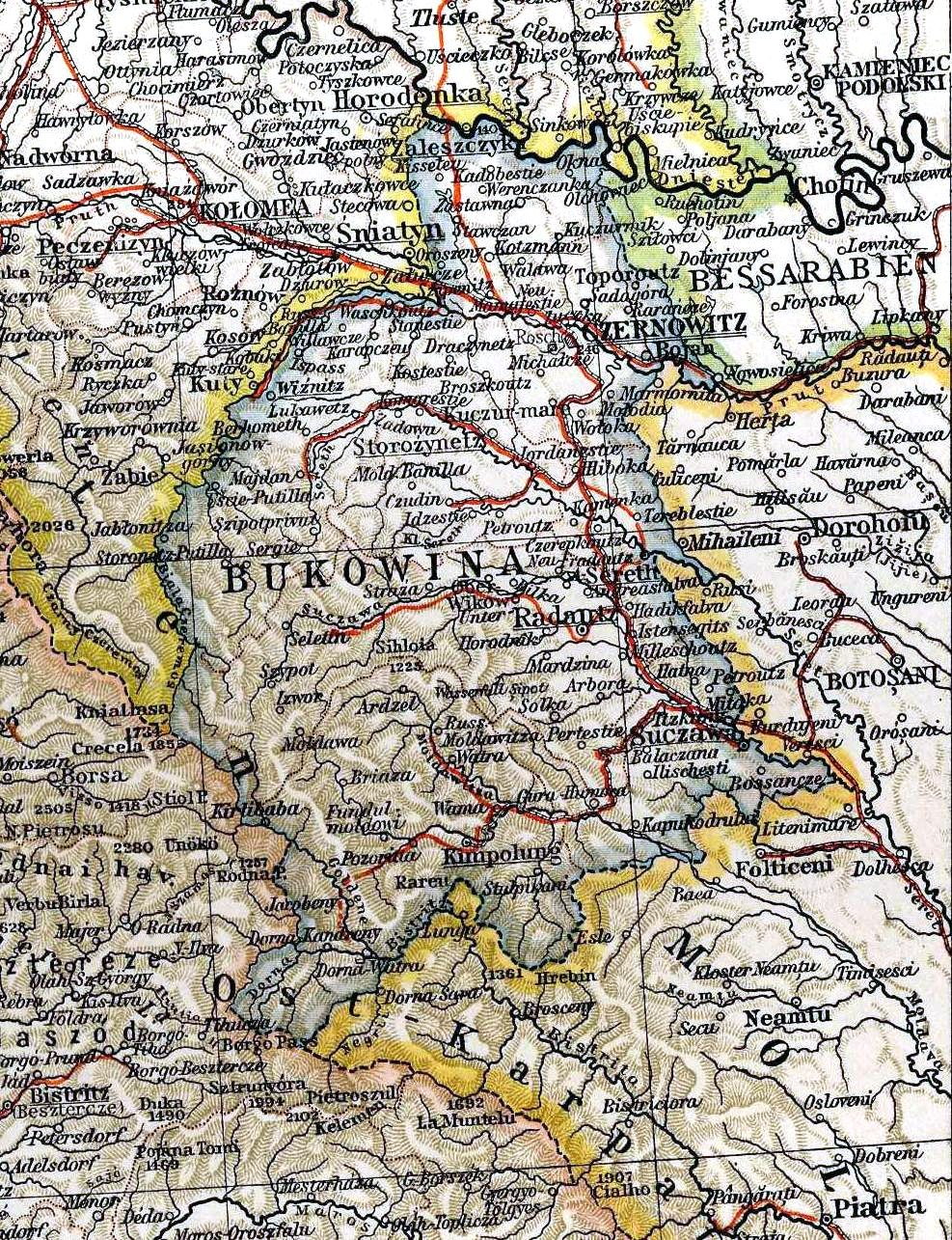
Map of the Austrian crownland of Bukovina at the turn of the 20th century.

The 1871 and 1904 celebrations held at Putna Monastery, near the tomb of Stephen the Great, constituted tremendous moments for Romanian national identity in Bukovina. Since gaining its independence, the Kingdom of Romania had had designs on incorporating this province into its new Kingdom. Romanians considered it to be a core part of the old Principality of Moldavia, and of great significance to its history. It contained many prominent historical Moldavian monuments, art and architecture and remained a strong cultural anchor for Moldavians in particular.

During the Habsburg period, the Ukrainian population increased in the north of the region, while in the south the ethnic Romanian population remained the majority population. The Austrians "managed to keep a balance between the various ethnic groups." In the 1880 census, there were 239,690 Ruthenians and Hutsuls, or roughly 41.5% of the regions population, while Romanians were second with 190,005 people or 33%, a ratio that remained more or less the same until World War I. The percentage of Romanians fell from roughly 85% (per Keith Hitchins) or 59.6% (per Constantin Ungureanu) in 1774 to 34.1% in 1910. Ruthenians is an archaic name for Ukrainians, while the Hutsuls are a regional Ukrainian subgroup.

==== Ukrainian community ====
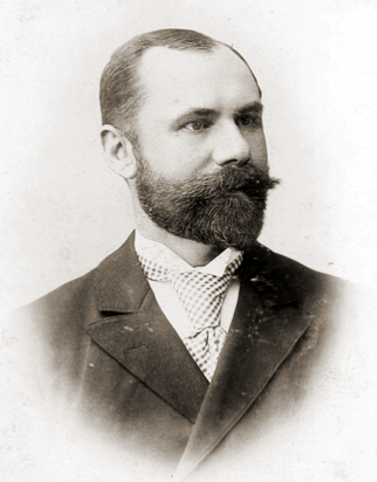
Stepan Smal-Stotsky, 1893

Similar to other ethnicities in the Austrian Empire, a national sentiment ignited in the 1840s among ethnic Ukrainians. Originally started during the Revolutions of 1848, the nationalist movement gained strength in 1869, when the Ruska Besida Society was founded in Czernowitz. By the 1890s, Ukrainians were represented in the regional diet and Vienna parliament, being led by Stepan Smal-Stotsky. Beside Stotsky, other important Bukovinian leaders were Yerotei Pihuliak, Omelian Popovych, Mykola Vasylko, Orest Zybachynsky, Denys Kvitkovsky, Sylvester Nikorovych, Ivan and Petro Hryhorovych, and Lubomyr Husar. The first periodical in the Ukrainian language, Bukovyna (published from 1885 until 1918) was published by the populists since the 1880s. The Ukrainian populists fought for their ethnocultural rights against the Austrians.

Peasant revolts broke out in Hutsul areas in the 1840s, with the peasants demanding more rights, socially and politically. Likewise, nationalist sentiment spread among the Romanians. As a result, more rights were given to Ukrainians and Romanians, with five Ukrainians (including notably Lukian Kobylytsia), two Romanians and one German elected to represent the region. The Ukrainians won representation at the provincial diet as late as 1890, and fought for equality with the Romanians also in the religious sphere. This was partly achieved only as late as on the eve of World War I. However, their achievements were accompanied by friction with Romanians. Overpopulation in the countryside caused migration (especially to North America), also leading to peasant strikes. However, by 1914 Bukovina managed to get "the best Ukrainian schools and cultural-educational institutions of all the regions of Ukraine." Beside Ukrainians, also Bukovina's Germans and Jews, as well as a number of Romanians and Hungarians, emigrated in 19th and 20th century.

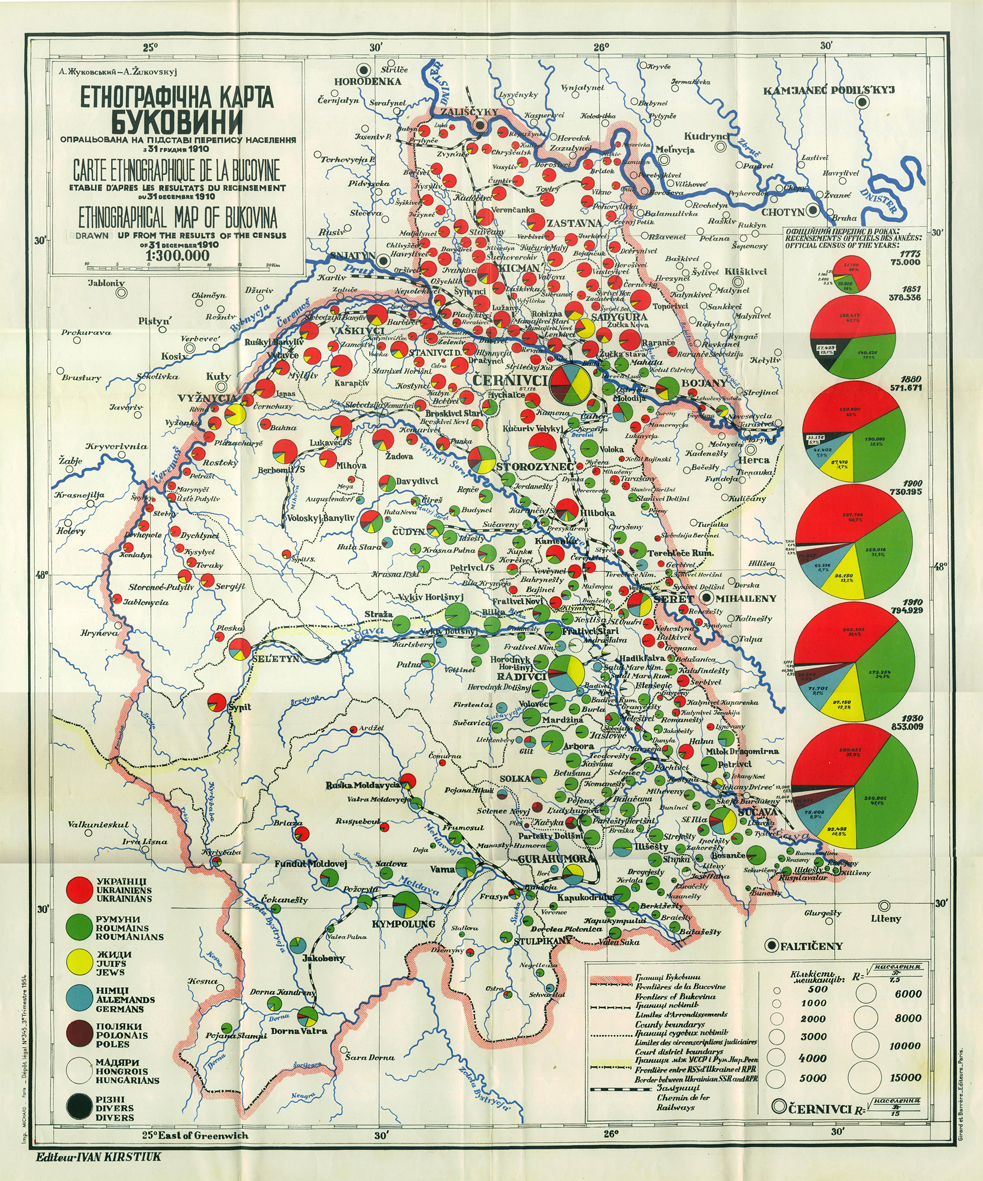
Ethnic groups in Bukovina 1775–1930 (Ukrainians in red, Romanians in green).

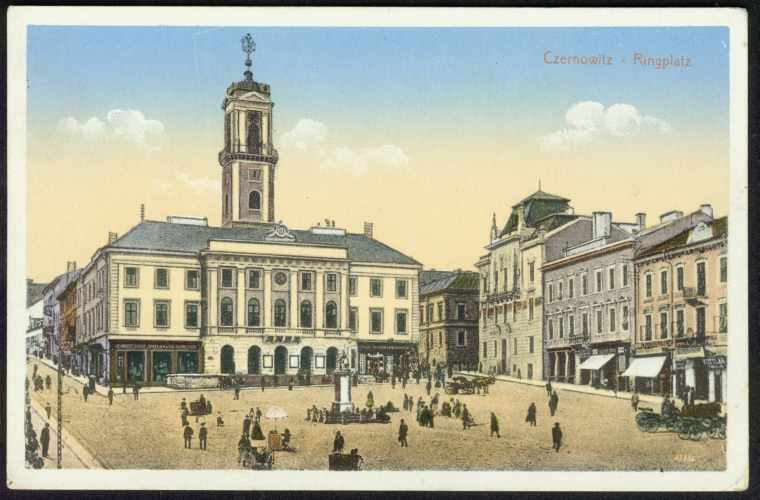
Czernowitz c. 1905

Under Austrian rule, Bukovina remained ethnically mixed: Romanians were predominant in the south, Ukrainians (commonly referred to as Ruthenians in the Empire) in the north, with small numbers of Hungarian Székelys, Slovak, and Polish peasants, and Germans, Poles and Jews in the towns. The 1910 census counted 800,198 people, of which: Ruthenians 38.88%, Romanians 34.38%, Germans 21.24% (Jews 12.86% included), Polish people 4.55%, Hungarian people 1.31%, Slovaks 0.08%, Slovenes 0.02%, Italian people 0.02%, and a few Croats, Romani people, Serbs and Turkish people. While reading the statistics it should be mentioned that, due to "adverse economic conditions", some 50,000 Ukrainians left the region (mostly emigrating to North America) between 1891 and 1910, in the aforementioned migrations. Nonetheless, the percentage of Ukrainians has significantly grown since the end of the eighteenth century.

In 1783, by an imperial decree of Joseph II, the local Eastern Orthodox Eparchy of Bukovina (with its seat in Czernowitz) was placed under spiritual jurisdiction of the Metropolitanate of Karlovci. Some friction appeared in time between the church hierarchy and the Romanians, complaining that Old Church Slavonic was favored to Romanian, and that family names were being slavicized. In spite of Romanian-Slavic speaking frictions over the influence in the local church hierarchy, there was no Romanian-Ukrainian inter-ethnic tension, and both cultures developed in educational and public life. After the rise of Ukrainian nationalism in 1848 and the following rise of Romanian nationalism, Habsburg authorities reportedly awarded additional rights to Ukrainians in an attempt to temper Romanian ambitions of independence. On the other hand, the Ukrainians had to struggle against the Austrians, with the Austrians rejecting both nationalist claims, favoring neither Romanians nor Ukrainians, while attempting to "keep a balance between the various ethnic groups." Indeed, a group of scholars surrounding the Austrian Archduke Franz Ferdinand were planning to turn Austria-Hungary into a federation. These plans included creating a majority-Romanian state of Transylvania within the federation which would have included Bukovina with Czernowitz. After they acquired Bukovina, the Austrians opened only one elementary school in Czernowitz (Ukrainian Чернівці, Romanian Cernăuți), which taught exclusively in Romanian. They later did open German schools, but no Ukrainian ones. Ukrainian language would appear in Chernivsti's schools as late as 1851, but only as a subject, at the local university (in spite of this, the city attracted students from other parts of Bukovina and Galicia, who would study in the German language of instruction). Lukjan Kobylytsia, a Ukrainian Bukovinian farmer and activist, died of torture-related causes after attempting to ask for more rights for the Bukovinian Ukrainians to the Austrians. He died of the consequence of torture in 1851 in Solca. At the end of the 19th century, the development of Ukrainian culture in Bukovina surpassed Galicia and the rest of Ukraine with a network of Ukrainian educational facilities.

In 1873, the Eastern Orthodox Bishop of Czernowitz (who was since 1783 under the spiritual jurisdiction of the Metropolitan of Karlovci) was elevated to the rank of Archbishop, when a new Metropolitanate of Bukovinian and Dalmatia was created. The new archbishop of Czernowitz gained supreme jurisdiction in all Cisleithania, over "Serbian" eparchies of Dalmatia and Kotor, which were also (until then) under the spiritual jurisdiction of the Patriarchate of Karlovci.

In the early 20th century, a group of scholars surrounding the Austrian Archduke Franz Ferdinand created a plan (that never came to pass) of United States of Greater Austria. The specific proposal was published in Aurel Popovici's book "Die Vereinigten Staaten von Groß-Österreich" [The United States of Greater Austria], Leipzig, 1906. According to it, most of Bukovina (including Czernowitz) would form, with Transylvania, a Romanian state, while the north-western portion (Zastavna, Kozman, Waschkoutz, Wiznitz, Gura Putilei, and Seletin districts) would form with the bigger part of Galicia a Ukrainian state, both in a federation with 13 other states under the Austrian crown.

=== Kingdom of Romania ===
Romanian takeover of Bukovina
- Part of the Polish–Ukrainian War
Date	11–12 November 1918
Location	Bukovina, now part of Romania and Ukraine
Result	Romanian victory
Territorial changes	Bukovina subsequently united with Romania on 28 November

Belligerents
West Ukrainian People's Republic	Romania

Commanders and leaders
Yevhen Petrushevych	Ferdinand I

In World War I, several battles were fought in Bukovina between the Austro-Hungarian, German, and Russian armies, which resulted in the Russian army invading Czernowitz for three times (30 August to 21 October 1914, 26 November 1914 to 18 February 1915 and 18 June 1916 to 2 August 1917). The regime that had occupied the city pursued a policy of persecution of "nationally conscious Ukrainians". The situation was not improved until the February Revolution of 1917. The Russian were driven out in 1917. Bukovina suffered great losses during the war.

With the collapse of Austria-Hungary in 1918, both the local Romanian National Council and the Ukrainian National Council based in Galicia claimed the region. In the beginning, Bukovina joined the fledging West Ukrainian National Republic (November 1918), but it was occupied by the Romanian army immediately thereafter.

A Constituent Assembly on 14/27 October 1918 formed an executive committee, to whom the Austrian governor of the province handed power. After an official request by Iancu Flondor, Romanian troops swiftly moved in to take over the territory, against Ukrainian protest. Although local Ukrainians attempted to incorporate parts of Northern Bukovina into the short-lived West Ukrainian People's Republic, this attempt was defeated by Polish and Romanian troops.

The Ukrainian Regional Committee, led by Omelian Popovych, organized a rally in Czernowitz on 3 November 1918, demanding Bukovina's annexation to Ukraine. The committee took power in the Ukrainian part of Bukovina, including its biggest center Czernowitz. The Romanian moderates, who were led by Aurel Onciul, accepted the division. However, the Romanian conservatives, led by Iancu Flondor, rejected the idea. In spite of Ukrainian resistance, the Romanian army occupied the Northern Bukovina, including Czernowitz, on 11 November.

Under the protection of Romanian troops, the Romanian Council summoned a General Congress of Bukovina for 15/28 November 1918, where 74 Romanians, 13 Ruthenians, 7 Germans, and 6 Poles were represented (this is the linguistic composition, and Jews were not recorded as a separate group). According to Romanian historiography, popular enthusiasm swept the whole region, and a large number of people gathered in the city to wait for the resolution of the Congress. The council was quickly summoned by the Romanians upon their occupation of Bukovina.

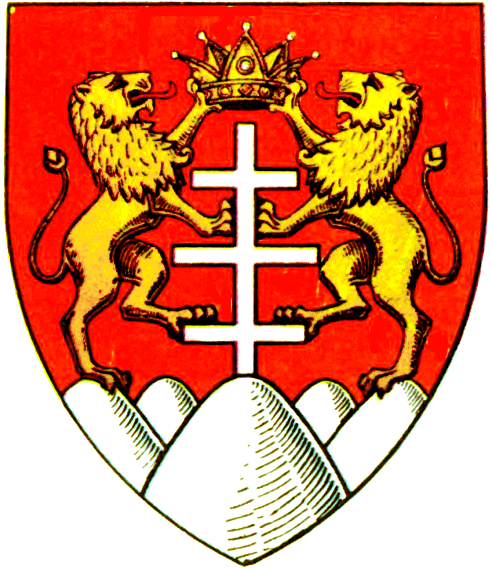
Coat of arms of interwar Suceava county in the Kingdom of Romania

The Congress elected the Romanian Bukovinian politician Iancu Flondor as chairman, and voted for the union with the Kingdom of Romania, with the support of the Romanian, German, and Polish representatives; the Ukrainians did not support this. The reasons stated were that, until its takeover by the Habsburg in 1775, Bukovina was the heart of the Principality of Moldavia, where the gropnițele domnești (voivods' burial sites) are located, and dreptul de liberă hotărâre de sine (right of self-determination). (Note: "Congresul general al Bucovinei, întrupând suprema putere a țării și fiind învestiți cu puterea legiuitoare, în numele suveranității naționale, hotărâm: Unirea necondiționată și pe vecie a Bucovinei în vechile ei hotare până la Ceremuș, Colacin și Nistru cu Regatul României". The General Congress of Bukovina, embodying the supreme power of the country [Bukovina], and invested with legislative power, in the name of national sovereignty, we decide: Unconditional and eternal union of Bukovina, in its old boundaries up to Ceremuș [river], Colachin and Dniester [river] with the Kingdom of Romania.) Romanian control of the province was recognized internationally in the Treaty of St. Germain in 1919. Bukovina's autonomy was undone during Romanian occupation, the region being reduced to an ordinary Romanian province. It was subject to martial law from 1918 to 1928, and again from 1937 to 1940.

The Ukrainian language was suppressed, "educational and cultural institutions, newspapers and magazines were closed."

Romanian authorities oversaw a renewed programme of Romanianization aiming its assimilationist policies at the Ukrainian population of the region. In addition to the suppression of the Ukrainian people, their language and culture, Ukrainian surnames were Rumanized, and the Ukrainian Orthodox Church was persecuted. In the 1930s an underground nationalist movement, which was led by Orest Zybachynsky and Denys Kvitkovsky, emerged in the region. The Romanian government suppressed it by staging two political trials in 1937.

At the same time, Ukrainian enrollment at the Cernăuți University fell from 239 out of 1671, in 1914, to 155 out of 3,247, in 1933, while simultaneously Romanian enrollment there increased several times to 2,117 out of 3,247. In part this was due to attempts to switch to Romanian as the primary language of university instruction, but chiefly to the fact that the university was one of only five in Romania, and was considered prestigious.

In the decade following 1928, as Romania tried to improve its relations with the Soviet Union, Ukrainian culture was given some limited means to redevelop, though these gains were sharply reversed in 1938.

According to the 1930 Romanian census, Romanians made up 44.5% of the total population of Bukovina, and Ukrainians (including Hutsuls) 29.1%. In the northern part of the region, however, Romanians made up only 32.6% of the population, with Ukrainians significantly outnumbering Romanians.

On 14 August 1938 Bukovina officially disappeared from the map, becoming a part of Ținutul Suceava, one of ten new administrative regions. At the same time, Cernăuți, the third most populous town in Romania (after Bucharest and Chișinău), which had been a mere county seat for the last 20 years, became again a (regional) capital. Also, Bukovinian regionalism continued under the new brand. During its first months of existence, Ținutul Suceava suffered far right (Iron Guard) uproars, to which the regional governor Gheorghe Alexianu (the future governor of the Transnistria Governorate) reacted with nationalist and anti-Semitic measures. Alexianu was replaced by Gheorghe Flondor on 1 February 1939.

=== Division of Bukovina ===
Bukovina as divided in 1940: Soviet to the north, Romanian to the south.

As a result of the Molotov–Ribbentrop Pact, the USSR demanded not only Bessarabia but also the northern half of Bukovina and Hertsa regions from Romania on 26 June 1940 (Bukovina bordered Eastern Galicia, which the USSR had annexed during the Invasion of Poland). Initially, the USSR wanted the whole of Bukovina. Nazi Germany, which was surprised by the Soviet claim to Bukovina, invoked the presence of ethnic Germans living in the region to protest the claim. As a result, the USSR only demanded the northern, overwhelmingly Ukrainian part, arguing that it was a "reparation for the great loss produced to the Soviet Union and Bassarabia's population by twenty-two years of Romanian domination of Bassarabia". Following the Soviet ultimatum, Romania ceded Northern Bukovina, which included Cernăuți, to the USSR on 28 June 1940. The withdrawal of the Romanian Army, authorities, and civilians was disastrous. Mobs attacked retreating soldiers and civilians, whereas a retreating unit massacred Jewish soldiers and civilians in the town of Dorohoi. The Red Army occupied Cernăuți and Storojineț counties, as well as parts of Rădăuți and Dorohoi counties (the latter belonged to Ținutul Suceava, but not to Bukovina). The new Soviet-Romanian border was traced less than 20 kilometres (12 miles) north of Putna Monastery. Until 22 September 1940, when Ținutul Suceava was abolished, the spa town Vatra Dornei served as the capital of Ținutul Suceava.

==== Second World War ====
In 1940, Chernivtsi Oblast (2/3 of which is Northern Bukovina) had a population of circa 805,000, out of which 47.5% were Ukrainians and 28.3% were Romanians, with Germans, Jews, Poles, Hungarians, and Russians comprising the rest. The strong Ukrainian presence was the official motivation for the inclusion of the region into the Ukrainian SSR and not into the newly formed Moldavian SSR. Whether the region would have been included in the Moldavian SSR, if the commission presiding over the division had been led by someone other than the communist leader Nikita Khrushchev, remains a matter of debate among scholars. In fact, some territories with a mostly Romanian population (e.g., Hertsa region) were allotted to the Ukrainian SSR.

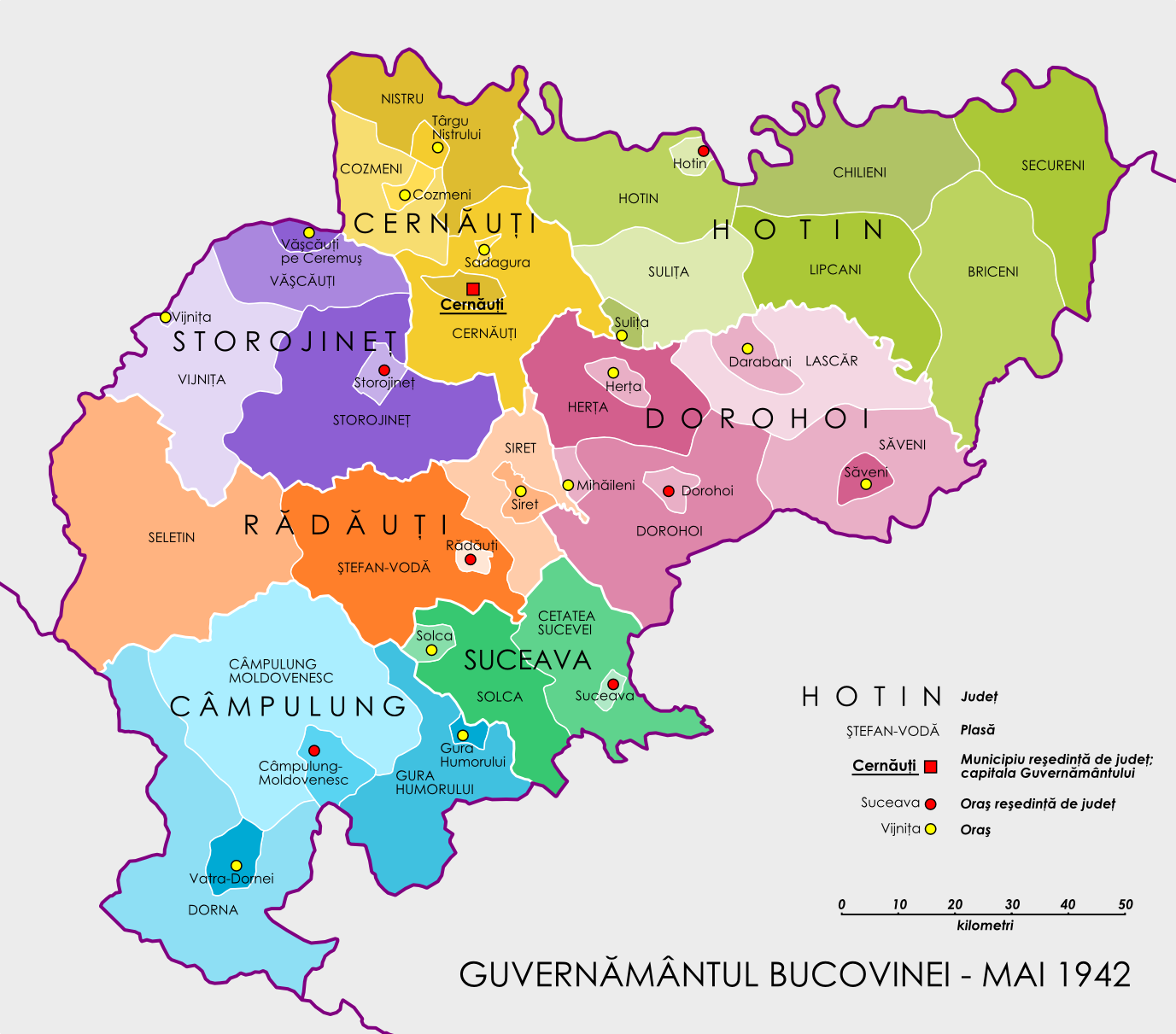
Administrative map of the Bukovina Governorate as of May 1942

After the instauration of Soviet rule, under NKVD orders, thousands of local families were deported to Siberia during this period, with 12,191 people targeted for deportation in a document dated 2 August 1940 (from all formerly Romanian regions included in the Ukrainian SSR), while a December 1940 document listed 2,057 persons to be deported to Siberia. The largest action took place on 13 June 1941, when about 13,000 people were deported to Siberia and Kazakhstan. The total number of deportees from Soviet Moldova to Siberia in June 1941 and of people eligible for deportation who were not deported was 31,699, while 8,374 were deported or eligible for deportation from the Chernivtsi oblast of Ukraine and 3,767 from the Izmail oblast of Ukraine (southern Bessarabia); the total was 43,840. According to Bougai, 22,643 individuals from Soviet Moldova were deported in September 1941. Only 1,136 of those deported from the Izmail oblast were still alive in Western Siberia, in the Tomsk region, in 1951. The number of deportees to the Soviet north and east from the Hertsa Raion in its boundaries from early 2020 of the Chernivtsi Oblast on 13 June 1941, was 1,373; 219 (15.95%) of them would later die in Siberia and Kazakhstan. The number of inhabitants of the Chernivtsi Oblast who were deported to Siberia and Kazakhstan was 7,720 (2,279 families). According to some sources, most of the deportees of June 1941 from the Chernivtsi Oblast, who were of many ethnicities, did not return from the Soviet east. However, the fragmentary, locality-by-locality, evidence indicates that most of the deportees from 1941 survived. The majority of those targeted were ethnic native Romanians, but there were (to a lesser degree) representatives of other ethnicities, as well. According to Dr. Avigdor Schachan, who wrote a book about the Transnistrian ghettos, and was himself brought up in the Bessarabian part of the present-day Chernivtsi Oblast of Ukraine, about 2,000 northern Bukovinian and 4,000 Bessarabian Jews were deported to the Soviet east.

Until the repatriation convention of 15 April 1941, NKVD troops killed hundreds of Romanian peasants of Northern Bukovina as they tried to cross the border into Romania to escape from Soviet authorities. This culminated on 7 February 1941 with the Lunca massacre and on 1 April 1941 with the Fântâna Albă massacre.

During Soviet Communist rule in Bukovina, "private property was nationalized; farms were partly collectivized; and education was Ukrainianized. At the same time all Ukrainian organizations were disbanded, and many publicly active Ukrainians were either killed or exiled." A significant part of Ukrainian intelligentsia fled to Romania and Germany in the beginning of the occupation. When the conflict between the Soviets and Nazi Germany broke out, and the Soviet troops began moving out of Bukovina, the Ukrainian locals attempted to establish their own government, but they were not able to stop the advancing Romanian army.

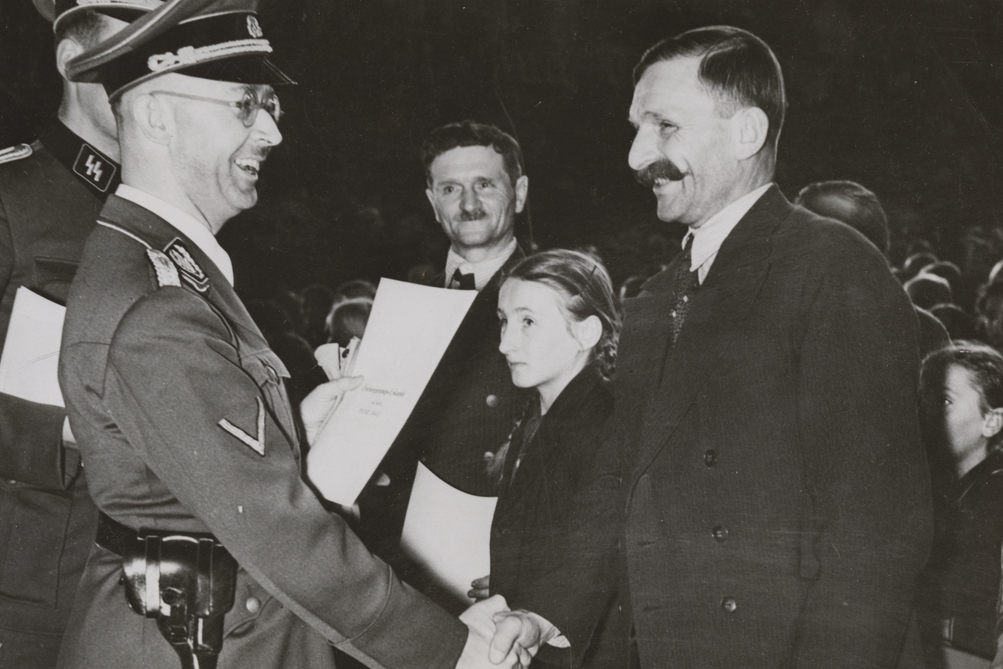
Heinrich Himmler handing naturalization papers to a repatriated Buconivian, Breslau, Germany (now Poland). c. 1941.

Almost the entire German population of Northern Bukovina was coerced to resettle in 1940–1941 to the parts of Poland then occupied by Nazi Germany, during 15 September 1940 – 15 November 1940, after this area was occupied by the Soviet Union. About 45,000 ethnic Germans had left Northern Bukovina by November 1940.

In the course of the 1941 attack on the Soviet Union by the Axis forces, the Romanian Third Army led by General Petre Dumitrescu (operating in the north), and the Fourth Romanian Army (operating in the south) regained Northern Bukovina, as well as Hertsa, and Bassarabia, during June–July 1941. It was organized as part of the Bukovina Governorate.

The Axis invasion of Northern Bukovina was catastrophic for its Jewish population, as conquering Romanian soldiers immediately began massacring its Jewish residents. Surviving Jews were forced into ghettoes to await deportation to work camps in Transnistria where 57,000 had arrived by 1941. One of the Romanian mayors of Cernăuți, Traian Popovici, managed to temporarily exempt from deportation 20,000 Jews living in the city between the fall of 1941 and the spring of 1942. Bukovina's remaining Jews were spared from certain death when it was retaken by Soviet forces in February 1944. In all, about half of Bukovina's entire Jewish population had perished. In southern Bukovina (the territory that is currently a part of Romania), in the counties of Campulung, Suceava and Radauti, there were 18,893 Jews according to the 1 September 1941 census; after the deportations to Transnistria later in the year, there were only 179 Jews in 1942. If one excludes the orphans, about 12,000 of the southern Bukovinian Jewish deportees survived the deportations to Transnistria. According to the Israeli scholar Gali Mir-Tibon 2018 study, over 70% of the Jews of southern Bukovina deported to Transnistria survived, with the orphans included in that figure. According to Gali Mir-Tibon, most of the Jews deported from the city of Chernivtsi, and northern Bukovina in general, to Transnistria did not survive. About 60% of the deportees to Transnistria from the city of Chernivtsi perished according to the Jewish Virtual Library. After the war and the return of the Soviets, most of the Jewish survivors from Northern Bukovina fled to Romania (and later settled in Israel). For more information on the Holocaust in Transnistria, including on the fate of the Jewish deportees from Bukovina, see History of the Jews in Transnistria.

According to Dr. Avigdor Schachan, who wrote a book about the Transnistrian ghettos, and was himself brought up in the Bessarabian part of the present-day Chernivtsi Oblast of Ukraine, about 2,000 northern Bukovinian and 4,000 Bessarabian Jews were deported to the Soviet east in June 1941. About half of the Jews deported from Bessarabia to the Soviet east survived and returned to Bessarabia according to a source mentioned by Jean Ancel (Matathias Carp), the specialist on the Holocaust in Romania and Transnistria, whereas the rest did not return. For more information on the history of the Jews of Bukovina, including during the Holocaust, see History of the Jews in Bukovina.

On 11 October 1942, the (Soviet) State Committee on Defense decided to extend the decrees on "the mobilization of the NKVD labour columns, German men, able to work, 17-50 years old - to the persons of other nations, being in war with USSR-Romanians, Hungarians, Italians, Finns."; the order was signed by Stalin. Authors Ion Popescu and Constantin Ungureanu, and their source, Aurel Popovici, claim that in May 1944, in the village of Molodiia and some other northern Bukovinian localities, those men who declared a "Moldovan" nationality were incorporated into the Soviet army, while those who declared a "Romanian" nationality were sent to the work camps in the area of Lake Onega, where most of them died. In March 1945, 3,967 Romanian citizens from Ukraine (excluding Jews), mostly from the Chernivtsi Oblast, were sent to the Soviet east. Popescu and Ungureanu, and their source, Dumitru Covalciuc, claim that the Soviet era dominance of the "Moldovan" identity in parts of northern Bukovina was due to the fact that the inhabitants of the Chernivtsi and Sadagura rural raions, and of the Bukovinian part of the Novoselytsia Raion, were pressured in 1944 to adopt a "Moldovan" national/ethnic identity.

==== After the war ====
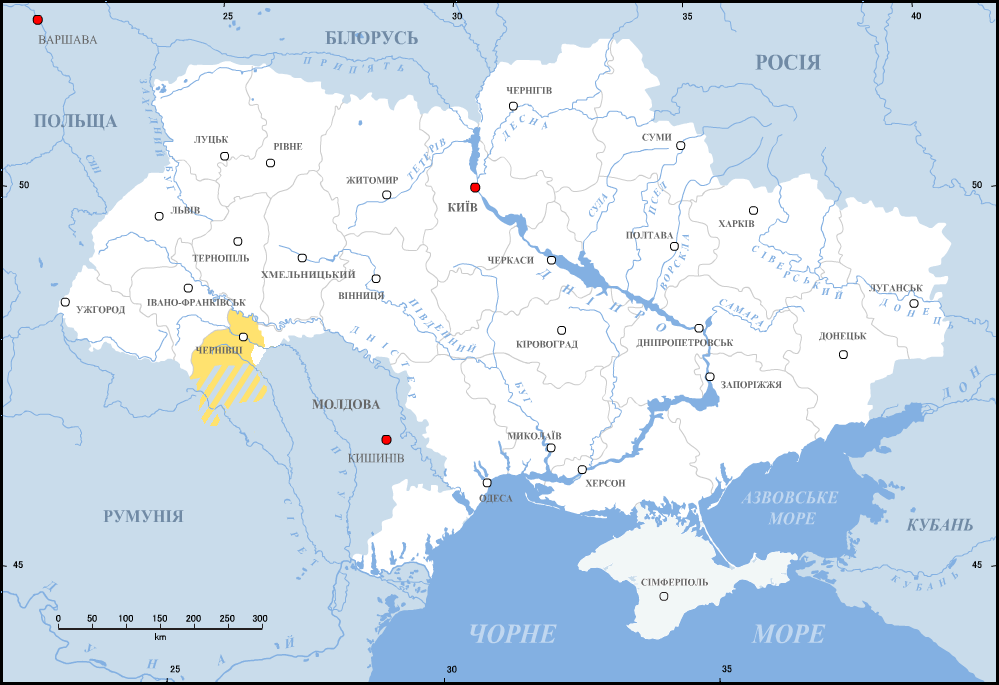
Northern Bukovina within Ukraine

Southern Bukovina within Romania

In 1944 the Red Army drove the Axis forces out and re-established Soviet control over the territory. Romania was forced to formally cede the northern part of Bukovina to the USSR by the 1947 Paris peace treaty. The territory became part of the Ukrainian SSR as Chernivtsi Oblast (province). While during the war the Soviet government killed or forced in exile a considerable number of Ukrainians, after the war the same government deported or killed about 41,000 Romanians. As a result of killings and mass deportations, entire villages, mostly inhabited by Romanians, were abandoned (Albovat, Frunza, I.G.Duca, Buci—completely erased, Prisaca, Tanteni and Vicov—destroyed to a large extent). Men of military age (and sometimes above), both Ukrainians and Romanians, were conscripted into the Soviet Army. That did not protect them, however, from being arrested and deported for being "anti-Soviet elements".

As a reaction, partisan groups (composed of both Romanians and Ukrainians) began to operate against the Soviets in the woods around Chernivtsi, Crasna and Codrii Cosminului. In Crasna (in the former Storozhynets county) villagers attacked Soviet soldiers who were sent to "temporarily resettle" them, since they feared deportation. This resulted in dead and wounded among the villagers, who had no firearms.

Spring 1945 saw the formation of transports of Polish repatriates who (voluntarily or by coercion) had decided to leave. Between March 1945 and July 1946, 10,490 inhabitants left Northern Bukovina for Poland, including 8,140 Poles, 2,041 Jews and 309 of other nationalities. Most of them settled in Silesia, near the towns: Bolesławiec, Dzierżoniów, Gubin, Lubań Śląski, Lwówek Śląski, Nowa Sól, Oława, Prudnik, Wrocław, Zielona Góra, Żagań, Żary.

Overall, between 1930 (last Romanian census) and 1959 (first Soviet census), the population of Northern Bukovina decreased by 31,521 people. According to official data from those two censuses, the Romanian population had decreased by 75,752 people, and the Jewish population by 46,632, while the Ukrainian and Russian populations increased by 135,161 and 4,322 people, respectively.

After 1944, the human and economic connections between the northern (Soviet) and southern (Romanian) parts of Bukovina were severed. Today, the historically Ukrainian northern part is the nucleus of the Ukrainian Chernivtsi Oblast, while the southern part is part of Romania, though there are minorities of Ukrainians and Romanians in Romanian Bukovina and Ukrainian Bukovina respectively. Ukrainians are still a recognized minority in Romania, and have one seat reserved in the Romanian Chamber of Deputies.

In Romania, 28 November is a holiday observed as Bukovina Day. A popular Romanian-language song about the region is "Cântă cucu-n Bucovina" ("Sings the Cuckoo in Bukovina").

== Geography ==
Bukovina proper has an area of 10,442 km^{2} (4,032 sq mi). The territory of Romanian (or Southern) Bukovina is located in northeastern Romania and it is part of the Suceava County (plus three localities in Botoșani County), whereas Ukrainian (or Northern) Bukovina is located in western Ukraine and it is part of the Chernivtsi Oblast.

== Population ==
=== Historical population ===
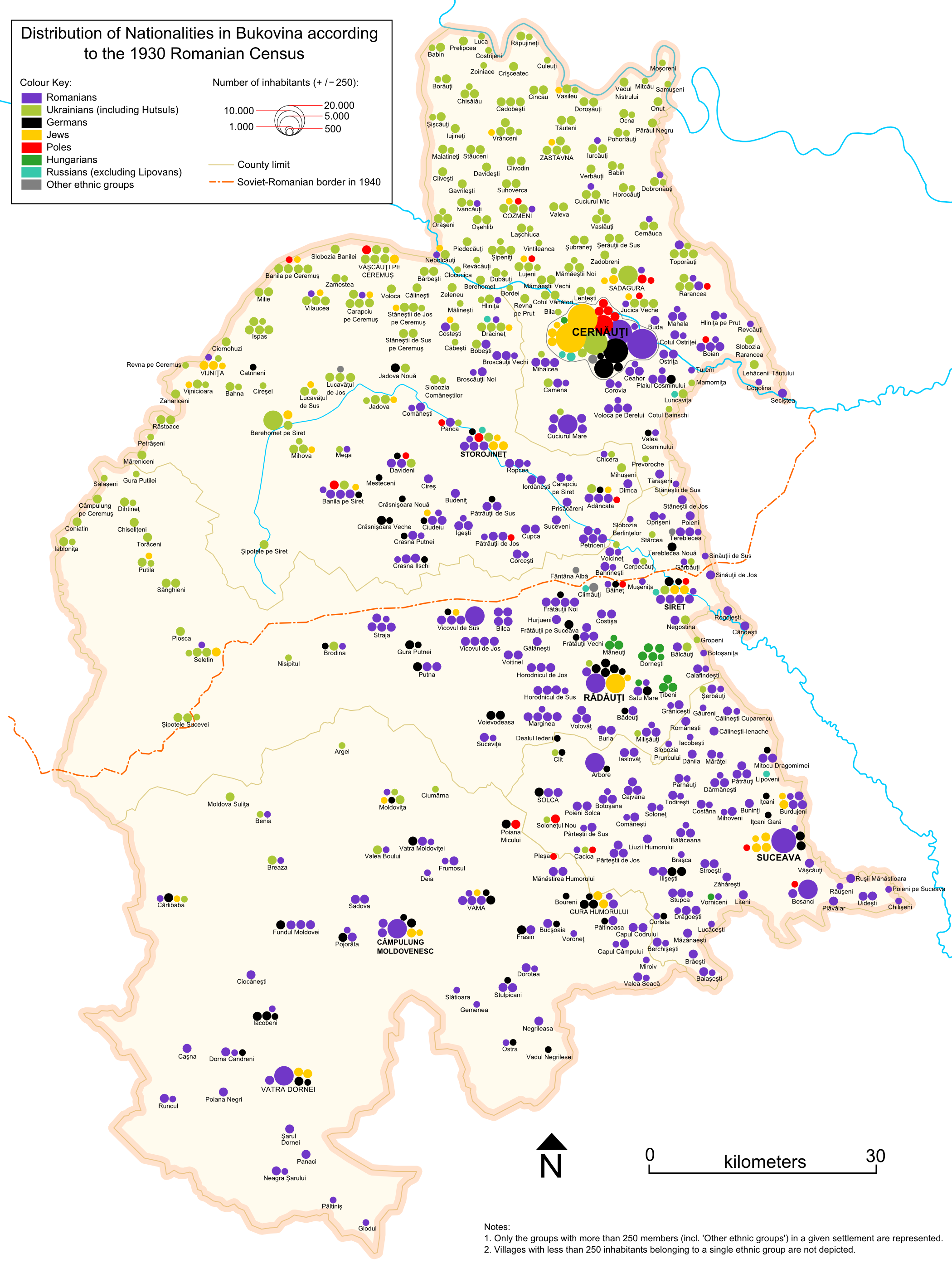
Demographic composition of Bukovina in 1930

The region was occupied by several now extinct peoples. After which it was settled by both Romanians (Moldavians) and Ukrainians (Ruthenians) with the Antes controlling a large area that included Bukovina by the 6th century. Later, the region was part of Kievan Rus', and later still of the Kingdom of Galicia–Volhynia. During this period it reinforced its ties to other Ukrainian lands, with many Bukovinian natives studying in Lviv and Kyiv, and the Orthodox Bukovinian Church flourishing in the region. After passing to Hungary in the 14th century, the Hungarian king appointed Dragoș as his deputy forming the principality of Moldavia, following the revolt of Bogdan the Founder against the Kingdom of Hungary, Bukovina became an integral part of the principality of Moldavia. Suceava, in the south of the territory, was the capital of Moldavia from the late 14th to the mid-16th century. The only data we have about the ethnic composition of Bukovina are the Austrian censuses starting from the 1770s. The Austrians hindered both Romanian and Ukrainian nationalisms. On the other hand, they favored the migration in Bukovina of Ukrainians from Galicia as well as Romanians from Transylvania and Maramureș.

According to the 1775 Austrian census, the province had a total population of 86,000 (this included 56 villages which were returned to Moldavia one year later). The census only recorded social status and some ethno-religious groups (Jews, Armenians, Roma, and German colonists). Historian Ion Nistor estimated that the 1774 population consisted of 52,750 Romanians (also called Moldavians) (73.5%), 15,000 Ruthenians and Hutsuls (20.9%) (of whom 6,000 were Hutsuls, and 9,000 were Ruthenian immigrants from Galicia and Podolia settled in Moldavia around 1766), and 4,000 others who "use the Romanian language in conversation" (5.6%), consisting of Armenians, Jews and Roma. Keith Hitchins on the other hand, estimated that in 1774 Bukovina's population consisted of 64,000 Romanians, 8,000 Ukrainians and 3,000 Germans, Jews, and Poles. According to Alecu Hurmuzaki, by 1848, out of a population of 377,581 people, 209,293 or 55.4% of the population was Romanian. At the same time, the Ukrainian population rose to 108,907 and the Jewish population surged from 526 in 1774, to 11,600 in 1848.

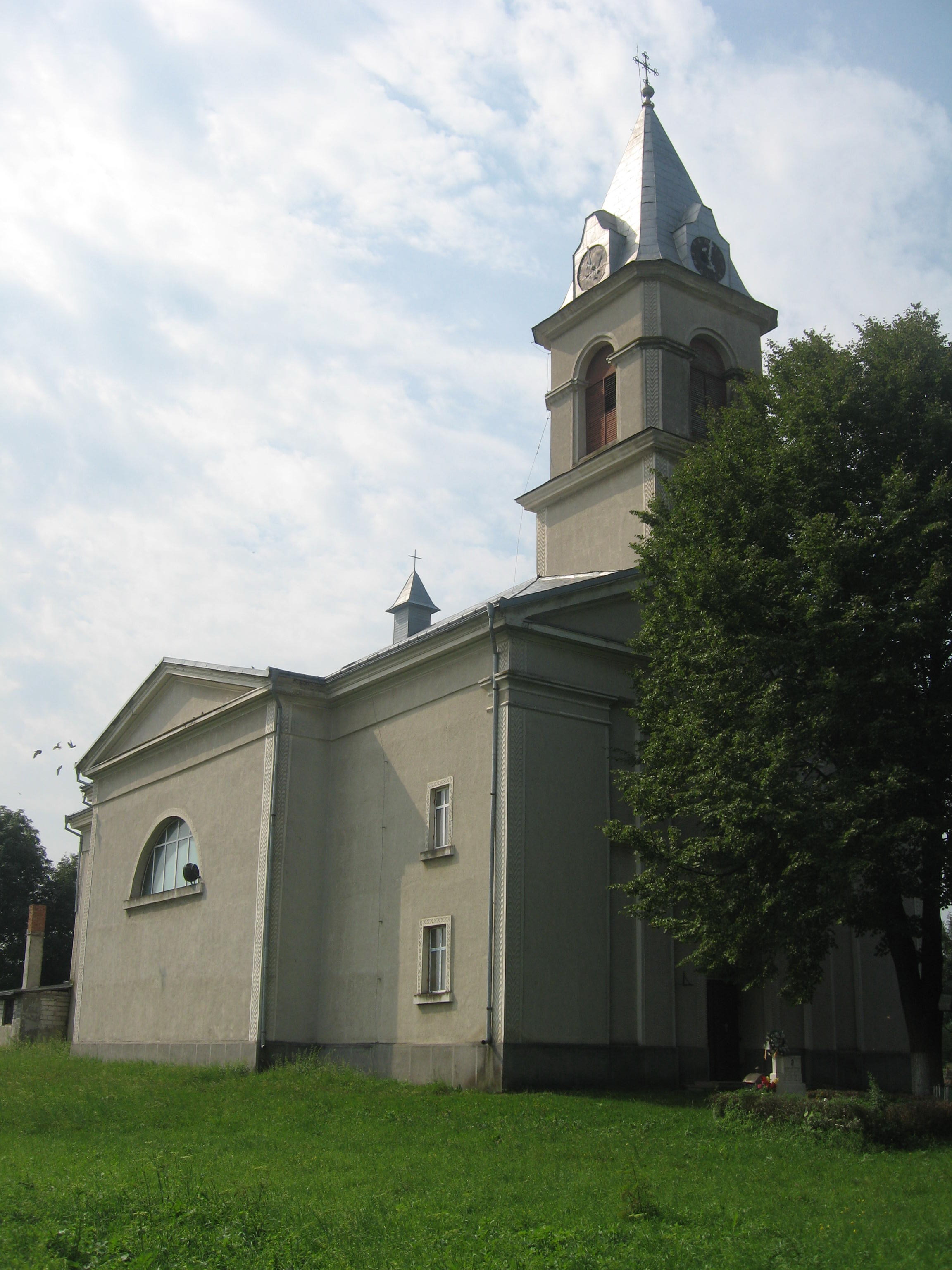
Dornești (German: Kriegsdorf, Hungarian: Hadikfalva), Suceava County, an example of a former mixed German-Hungarian rural settlement in Bukovina.

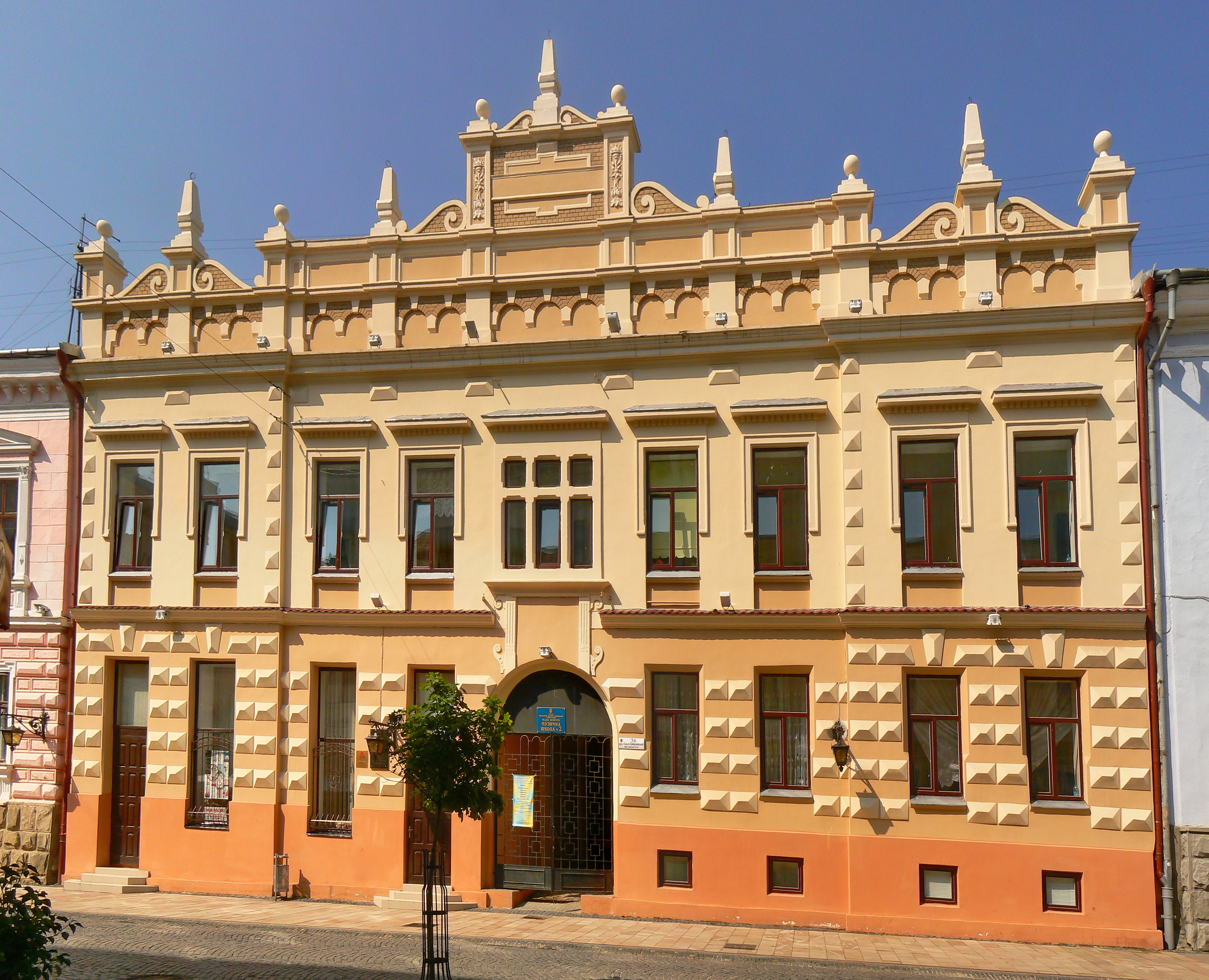
The Polish House in Chernivtsi (Polish: Czerniowce, Romanian: Cernăuți, German: Czernowitz)

In 2011, an anthropological analysis of the Russian census of the population of Moldavia in 1774 asserted a population of 68,700 people in 1774, out of which 40,920 (59.6%) Romanians, 22,810 Ruthenians and Hutsuls (33.2%), and 7.2% Jews, Roma, and Armenians.

Based on the above anthropological estimate for 1774 as well as subsequent official censuses, the ethnic composition of Bukovina changed in the years after 1775 when the Austrian Empire occupied the region. The population of Bukovina increased steadily, primarily through immigration, which Austrian authorities encouraged to develop the economy. Indeed, the migrants entering the region came from Ukrainian Galicia, as well as from Romanian Transylvania and Moldavia. Another Austrian official report from 1783, referring to the villages between the Dniester and the Prut, indicated Ruthenian-speaking immigrants from Poland constituting a majority, with only a quarter of the population speaking Moldavian. The same report indicated that Moldavians constituted the majority in the area of Suceava. H.F. Müller gives the 1840 population used for purposes of military conscription as 339,669.

In 1843 the Ruthenian language was recognized, along with the Romanian language, as 'the language of the people and of the Church in Bukovina'.

During the 19th century, as mentioned, the Austrian Empire policies encouraged the influx of migrants coming from Transylvania, Moldavia, Galicia and the heartland of Austria and Germany, with Germans, Poles, Jews, Hungarians, Romanians, and Ukrainians settling in the region. Official censuses in the Austrian Empire (later Austria-Hungary) did not record ethnolinguistic data until 1850–1851. The 1857 and 1869 censuses omitted ethnic or language-related questions. 'Familiar language spoken' was not recorded again until 1880.

The Austrian census of 1850–1851, which recorded data regarding languages spoken, shows 48.50% Romanians and 38.07% Ukrainians. Subsequent Austrian censuses between 1880 and 1910 reveal a Romanian population stabilizing around 33% and a Ukrainian population around 40%. From 1774 to 1910, the percentage of Ukrainians increased, meanwhile the one of Romanians decreased.

According to the 1930 Romanian census, Bukovina had a population of 853,009. Romanians made up 44.5% of the population, while 27.7% were Ukrainians/Ruthenians (plus 1.5% Hutsuls), 10.8% Jews, 8.9% Germans, 3.6% Poles, and 3.0% others or undeclared.

According to estimates and censuses data, the population of Bukovina was:

Year	Romanians		Ukrainians		Others (most notably Germans, Jews, and Poles)		Total
1774 (e)	40,920 – 64,000	59.6% – 85.33%	8,000 – 22,810	10.6% – 33.2%	3,000 – 4,970	4.0% – 7.2%	51,920 – 91,780
1848 (e)	209,293	55.4%	108,907	28.8%	59,381	15.8%	377,581
1851 (c)	184,718	48.5%	144,982	38.1%	51,126	13.4%	380,826
1880 (c)	190,005	33.4%	239,960	42.2%	138,758	24.4%	568,723
1890 (c)	208,301	32.4%	268,367	41.8%	165,827	25.8%	642,495
1900 (c)	229,018	31.4%	297,798	40.8%	203,379	27.8%	730,195
1910 (c)	273,254	34.1%	305,101	38.4%	216,574	27.2%	794,929
1930 (c)	379,691	44.5%	248,567	29.1%	224,751	26.4%	853,009

Note: e-estimate; c-census

=== Current population ===
The present demographic situation in Bukovina hardly resembles that of the Austrian Empire. The northern (Ukrainian) and southern (Romanian) parts became significantly dominated by their Ukrainian and Romanian majorities, respectively, with the representation of other ethnic groups being decreased significantly.

According to the data of the 2001 Ukrainian census, the Ukrainians represent about 75% (689,100) of the population of Chernivtsi Oblast, which is the closest, although not an exact, approximation of the territory of the historic Northern Bukovina. The census also identified a fall in the Romanian and Moldovan populations to 12.5% (114,600) and 7.3% (67,200), respectively. Russians are the next largest ethnic group with 4.1%, while Poles, Belarusians, and Jews comprise the rest 1.2%. The languages of the population closely reflect the ethnic composition, with over 90% within each of the major ethnic groups declaring their national language as the mother tongue (Ukrainian, Romanian, and Russian, respectively).

The fact that Romanians and Moldovans, a self-declared majority in some regions, were presented as separate categories in the census results, has been criticized in Romania, where there are complains that this artificial Soviet-era practice results in the Romanian population being undercounted, as being divided between Romanians and Moldovans. The Romanian minority of Ukraine also claims to represent a 500,000-strong community.

The Romanians mostly inhabit the southern part of the Chernivtsi region, having been the majority in former Hertsa Raion and forming a majority together with Moldovans in former Hlyboka Raion. According to the Ukraine Census (2001), the 72,676 residents of the raion reported themselves as following: Ukrainians: 34,025 (46.82%), Romanians: 32,923 (45.3%), Moldovans: 4,425 (6.09%), Russians: 877 (1.21%), and others: 426 (0.59%). Hlyboka raion, within its boundaries at that time, had 72,676 inhabitants in 2001, including 52.56% Ukrainian-speakers, 45.97% Romanian-speakers, and 1.15% Russian-speakers. In 2001, the population of Hertsa Raion was 32,316, of which 29,554 or 91.45% identified themselves as Romanians, 1,616 or 5.0% as Ukrainians, and 756 or 2.34% as Moldovans (out of which 511 self-identified their language as Moldovan and 237 as Romanian), 0.9% as Russians, and 0.3% as being of other ethnicities (see: Ukrainian Census, 2001). Self-declared Moldovans were the majority in the overwhelmingly Bessarabian rather than Bukovinian Novoselytsia Raion. In Novoselytsia Raion, among the 50,329 self-identified Moldovans (57.54%), 47,585 (54.54%) self-identified their language as Moldovan and 2,264 as Romanian (2.6%) according to the Ukrainian census of 2001; there were also 29,703 self-identified Ukrainians (35.05%), 5,904 Romanians (6.77%), 1,235 Russians (1.42%), and 290 others (0.29%). Novoselytsia raion, within its boundaries at that time, had 87,241 inhabitants in 2001, including 34.08% Ukrainian-speakers, 64% Romanian-speakers, and 1.78% Russian-speakers. In the other eight districts and the city of Chernivtsi, Ukrainians were the majority. However, after the 2020 administrative reform in Ukraine, all these districts were abolished, and most of the areas merged into Chernivtsi Raion, where Romanians are not in majority anymore.

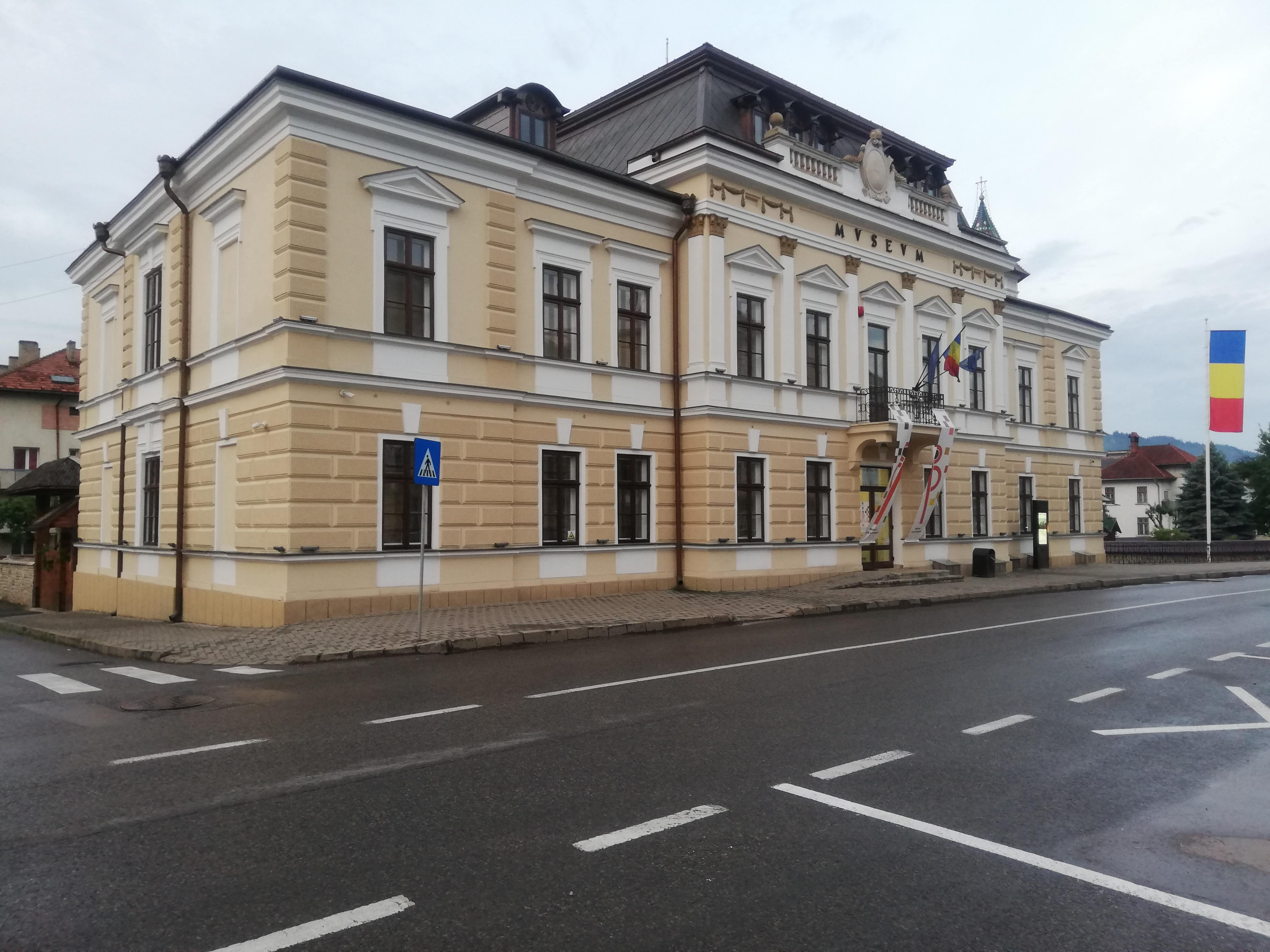
The renovated Wood Art Museum situated in Câmpulung Moldovenesc (German: Kimpolung).

The southern, or Romanian Bukovina reportedly has a significant Romanian majority (94.8%) according to Romanian sources, the largest minority group being the Romani people (1.9%) and Ukrainians, who make up 0.9% of the population (2011 census). Other minor ethnic groups include Lipovans, Poles (in Cacica, Mănăstirea Humorului, Mușenița, Moara, and Păltinoasa), Zipser Germans (in Cârlibaba and Iacobeni) and Bukovina Germans (in Suceava, Rădăuți, and Câmpulung Moldovenesc), as well as Slovaks and Jews (almost exclusively in Suceava, Rădăuți and Siret).

Concerns have been raised about the way census are handled in Romania. For example, according to the 2011 Romanian census, Ukrainians of Romania number 51,703 people, making up 0.3% of the total population. However, Ukrainian nationalists of the 1990s claimed the region had 110,000 Ukrainians. The Ukrainian descendants of the Zaporozhian Cossacks who fled Russian rule in the 18th century, living in the Dobruja region of the Danube Delta, also complained similar practices. In 1992, their descendants numbered four thousand people according to official Romanian statistics. However, the local community claims to number 20,000, five times the number stated by Romanian authorities. Rumanization, with the closure of schools and suppression of the language, happened in all areas in present-day Romania where the Ukrainians live or lived. The very term "Ukrainians" was prohibited from the official usage and some Romanians of disputable Ukrainian ethnicity were rather called the "citizens of Romania who forgot their native language" and were forced to change their last names to Romanian-sounding ones. In Bukovina, the practice of Romanization dates to much earlier than the 20th century. Since Louis of Hungary appointed Dragoș, Voivode of Moldavia as his deputy, there was an introduction of Romanians in Bukovina, and a process of Romanization that intensified in the 1560s.

Places such as the etymologically Ukrainian Breaza and Moldovița (whose name in German is Russ Moldawitza, and used to be Ruska Moldavyda in Ukrainian), Șerbăuți and Siret used to have an overwhelming Ukrainian majority. In some places in southern Bukovina, such as Balkivtsi (Romanian: Bălcăuți), Izvoarele Sucevei, Ulma and Negostina, Ukrainian majority is still reported in Romanian census. On other hand in North Bukovina the Romanians used to be the biggest ethnic group in the city of Chernivtsi, as well as in the towns of Hlyboka and Storozhynets, and still are in Boiany and Krasnoilsk.

=== Urban settlements ===
==== Romanian Bukovina ====
Table highlighting all urban settlements in Southern Bukovina
Romanian name	German name	Ukrainian name	Population
Cajvana	Keschwana	Кажване, Kazhvane	6,812
Câmpulung Moldovenesc	Kimpolung	Кимпулунґ, Kympulung; historically Довгопілля, Dovhopillya	16,105
Frasin	Frassin	Фрасин, Frasyn	5,702
Gura Humorului	Gura Humora	Ґура-Гумора, Gura-Humora	12,729
Milișăuți	Milleschoutz	Милишівці, Mylyshivtsi	4,958
Rădăuți	Radautz	Радівці, Radivtsi	22,145
Siret	Sereth	Сирет, Syret	7,721
Solca	Solka	Солька, Sol'ka	2,188
Suceava	Sotschen/Sutschawa/Suczawa; historically in Old High German: Sedschopff	Сучава, Suchava; historic Сочава, Sochava	124,161
Vatra Dornei	Dorna-Watra	Ватра Дорни, Vatra Dorny	13,659
Vicovu de Sus	Ober Wikow	Верхнє Викове, Verkhnye Vykove	16,874

==== Ukrainian Bukovina ====
Table highlighting all urban settlements in Northern Bukovina
Ukrainian name	Romanian name	German name	Population
Berehomet	Berehomete pe Siret	Berhometh	7,717
Boiany	Boian	Bojan	4,425
Chornivka	Cernăuca	Czernowka	2,340
Chernivtsi	Cernăuți	Czernowitz	266,366
Hlyboka	Adâncata	Hliboka	9,474
Kitsman	Cozmeni	Kotzman	6,287
Krasnoilsk	Crasna-Ilschi	Krasna	10,163
Luzhany	Lujeni	Luschany/Luzan	4,744
Mykhalcha	Mihalcea	Mihalcze	2,245
Nepolokivtsi	Nepolocăuți/Grigore-Ghica Vodă	Nepolokoutz/Nepolokiwzi	2,449
Putyla	Putila	Putilla Storonetz/Putyla	3,435
Storozhynets	Storojineț	Storozynetz	14,197
Vashkivtsi	Vășcăuți	Waschkautz/Waschkiwzi	5,415
Voloka	Voloca pe Derelui	Woloka	3,035
Vyzhnytsia	Vijnița	Wiznitz	4,068
Zastavna	Zastavna	Zastawna	7,898

== See also ==
- Principality of Moldavia
- Galicia, Central European historical region
- Bukovina Germans
- Székelys of Bukovina

== Sources ==
- Valentina Glajar (1 January 2004). The German Legacy in East Central Europe as Recorded in Recent German-language Literature. Camden House. pp. 13–. ISBN 978-1-57113-256-7.
- O. Derhachov, ed. (1996). Українська державність у ХХ столітті. (Ukrainian statehood of the twentieth century) (in Ukrainian). Politychna Dumka.
- 13.4 Notele ultimate ale guvernului sovietic din 26–27 iunie și răspunsurile guvernului roman (original version, in German – use English and French versions with caution)
- Dumitru Covălciuc. Românii nord-bucovineni în exilul totalitarismului sovietic
- Victor Bârsan "Masacrul inocenților", București, 1993, pp. 18–19
- Ștefan Purici. Represiunile sovietice... pp. 255–258;
- Vasile Ilica. Fântâna Albă: O mărturie de sânge (istorie, amintiri, mărturii). – Oradea: Editura Imprimeriei de Vest, 1999.
- Marian Olaru. Considerații preliminare despre demografie și geopolitică pe teritoriul Bucovinei. Analele Bucovinei. Tomul VIII. Partea I. București: Editura Academiei Române, 2001
- Țara fagilor: Almanah cultural-literar al românilor nord-bucovineni. Cernăuți-Târgu-Mureș, 1994
- Anița Nandris-Cudla. Amintiri din viață. 20 de ani în Siberia. Humanitas, Bucharest, 2006 (second edition), (in Romanian) ISBN 973-50-1159-X
- Jews of Bukovina on the Eve of the War. Secaucus, NJ: Miriam Weiner Routes to Roots Foundation. 1999. ISBN 978-0-9656508-0-9. Archived from the original on 14 October 2021 – via Adapted by Dorcas Gelabert and Stephen Freeman.
- Cristina Florea, Bukovina: The Life and Death of an East European Borderland (Princeton University Press, 2025) ISBN 9780691276809
