= Breaza de Sus =

Breaza de Sus may refer to several villages in Romania:

- Breaza de Sus, a district in the town of Breaza, Prahova County
- Breaza de Sus, a village in the commune of Breaza, Suceava
