= Șerbăuți =

Șerbăuți German: Scherboutz
- Commune
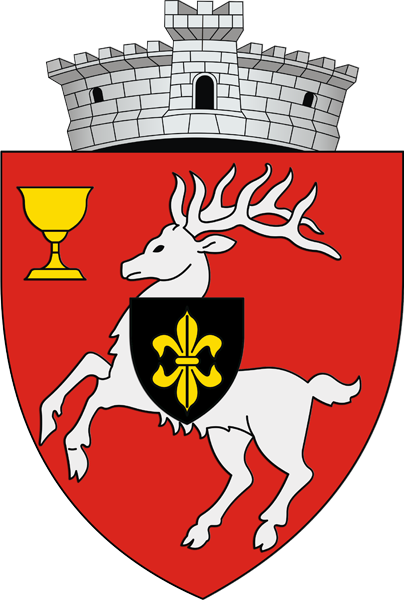
- Coat of arms

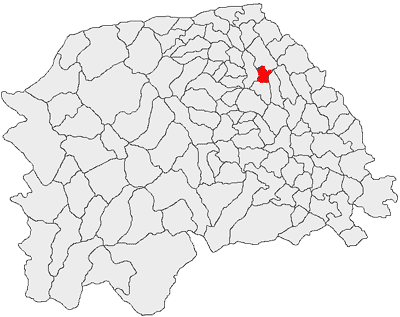
- Location in Suceava County

- Location in Romania
- Coordinates: 47°49′N 26°9′E
- Country: Romania
- County: Suceava
- Subdivisions: Șerbăuți, Călinești

Government
  - Mayor (2024–2028): Cătălin Sanduleac (PNL)
- Area: 34 km^{2} (13 sq mi)
- Elevation: 392 m (1,286 ft)
- Population (2021-12-01): 3,119
  - Density: 92/km^{2} (240/sq mi)
- Time zone: EET/EEST (UTC+2/+3)
- Postal code: 727108
- Area code: (+40) x30
- Vehicle reg.: SV
- Website: www.primariaserbauti.ro

Șerbăuți (Ukrainian: Шербеуць, German: Scherboutz) is a commune located in Suceava County, Bukovina, northeastern Romania. It is composed of two villages, namely Călinești and Șerbăuți.
