= Bălcăuți, Suceava =

Bălcăuți
- Commune
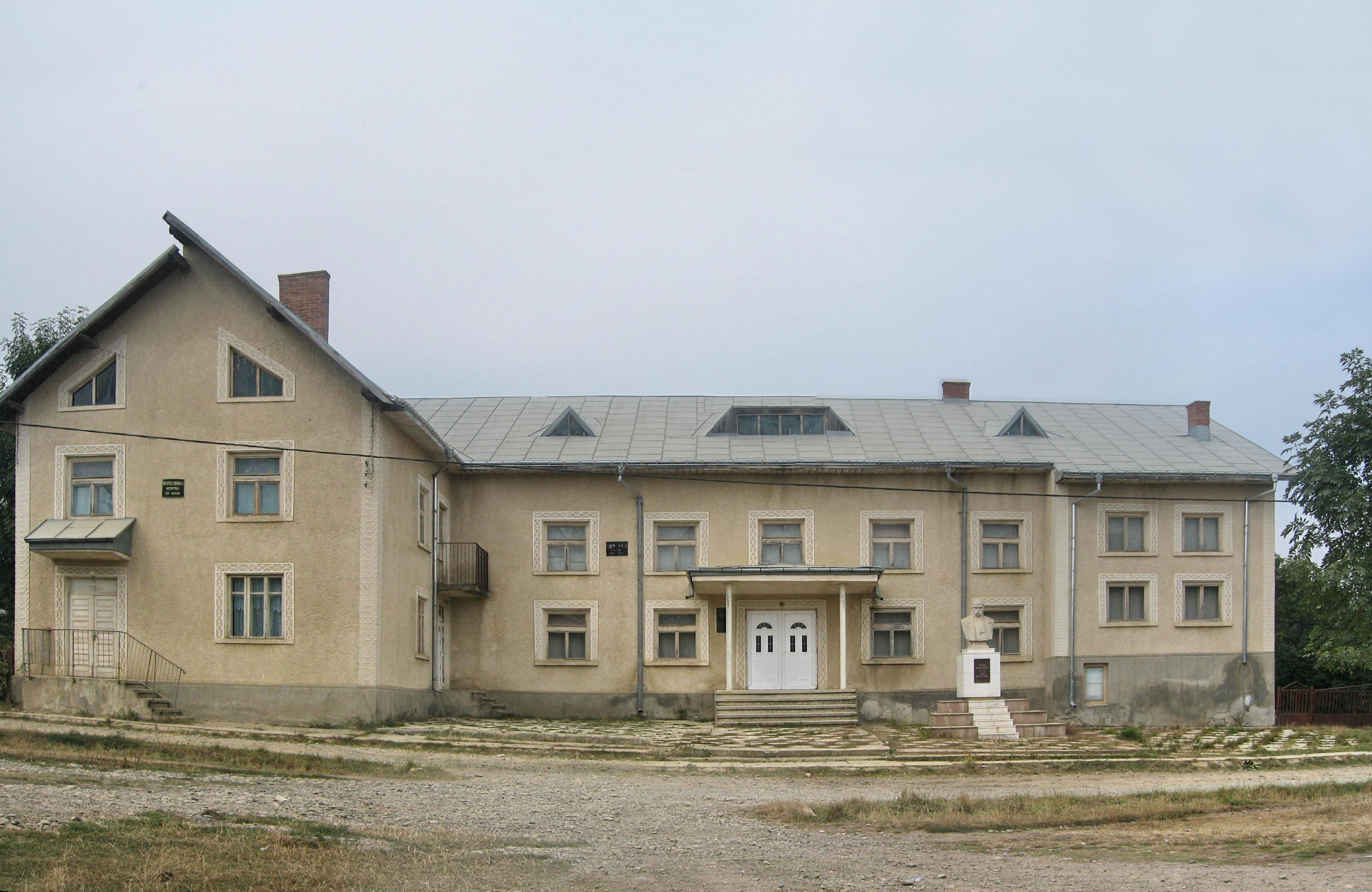

- Coat of arms

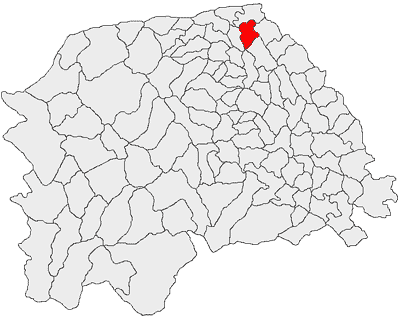
- Location in Suceava County

- Location in Romania
- Coordinates: 47°54′N 26°5′E
- Country: Romania
- County: Suceava
- Subdivisions: Bălcăuți, Gropeni, Negostina

Government
  - Mayor (2024–2028): Iulian-Petru Chideșa (PSD)
- Area: 35.9 km^{2} (13.9 sq mi)
- Elevation: 369 m (1,211 ft)
- Population (2021-12-01): 2,990
  - Density: 83.3/km^{2} (216/sq mi)
- Time zone: UTC+02:00 (EET)
  - Summer (DST): UTC+03:00 (EEST)
- Postal code: 727025
- Area code: +40 x30
- Vehicle reg.: SV
- Website: balcauti.ro

Bălcăuți (Ukrainian: Белкеуць; also Балківці) is a commune located in Suceava County, in the historical region of Bukovina, northeastern Romania. It is composed of three villages, namely: Bălcăuți, Gropeni, and Negostina.

At the 2011 Romanian census, 70.3% of inhabitants were Ukrainians and 29.6% Romanians. At the 2002 census, 74.4% were Eastern Orthodox, 6.9% stated they belonged to another religion, 6.3% were Seventh-day Adventist, 6.1% Greek Catholic and 4.5% Christian Evangelical.

== Negostina ==
The village of Negostina (Ukrainian: Негостина) features an important community of Ukrainians of Romania, with folk festivals taking place there from time to time.

Negostina hosts a bust of Ukrainian national poet Taras Shevchenko, one of three in Romania. Every year, on March 9 and 10, Ukrainian and Romanian officials lay wreaths on the bust.

=== 1930 Romanian census ===
According to the Romanian census conducted in 1930, the population of Negostina was 1,957 inhabitants. Most of the inhabitants were Ruthenians (51.3%), with a minority of Germans/Bukovina Germans (1.94%), one of Jews (0.85%), one of Romanians (43.35%), one of Lipovans (1.96%) and one of Poles (0.6%). From a religious point of view, most of the inhabitants were Orthodox (95.8%), but there were also Greek Catholics (0.75%), Jews (0.85%), and Roman Catholics (2.3%). Other people declared to be Evangelicals/Lutherans (4 people) and Adventists (4 people).

=== 2002 census ===
According to the 2002 Romanian census, the village had a population of 1474. 1095 (74.3%) declared Ukrainian nationality, while 371 (25.2%) declared Romanian nationality and 5 (0.3%) Polish nationality. As far as language 1118 (75.8%) declared Ukrainian language, while 347 (23.5%) declared Romanian language and 5 (0.3%) Polish nationality.

In 2002 the national composition was:

	Nationality		
Year	Ukrainians	Romanians	Poles
2002	1095	371	5

The declared language was:

	Language		
Year	Ukrainian	Romanian	Polish
2002	1118	347	5

=== Gallery ===
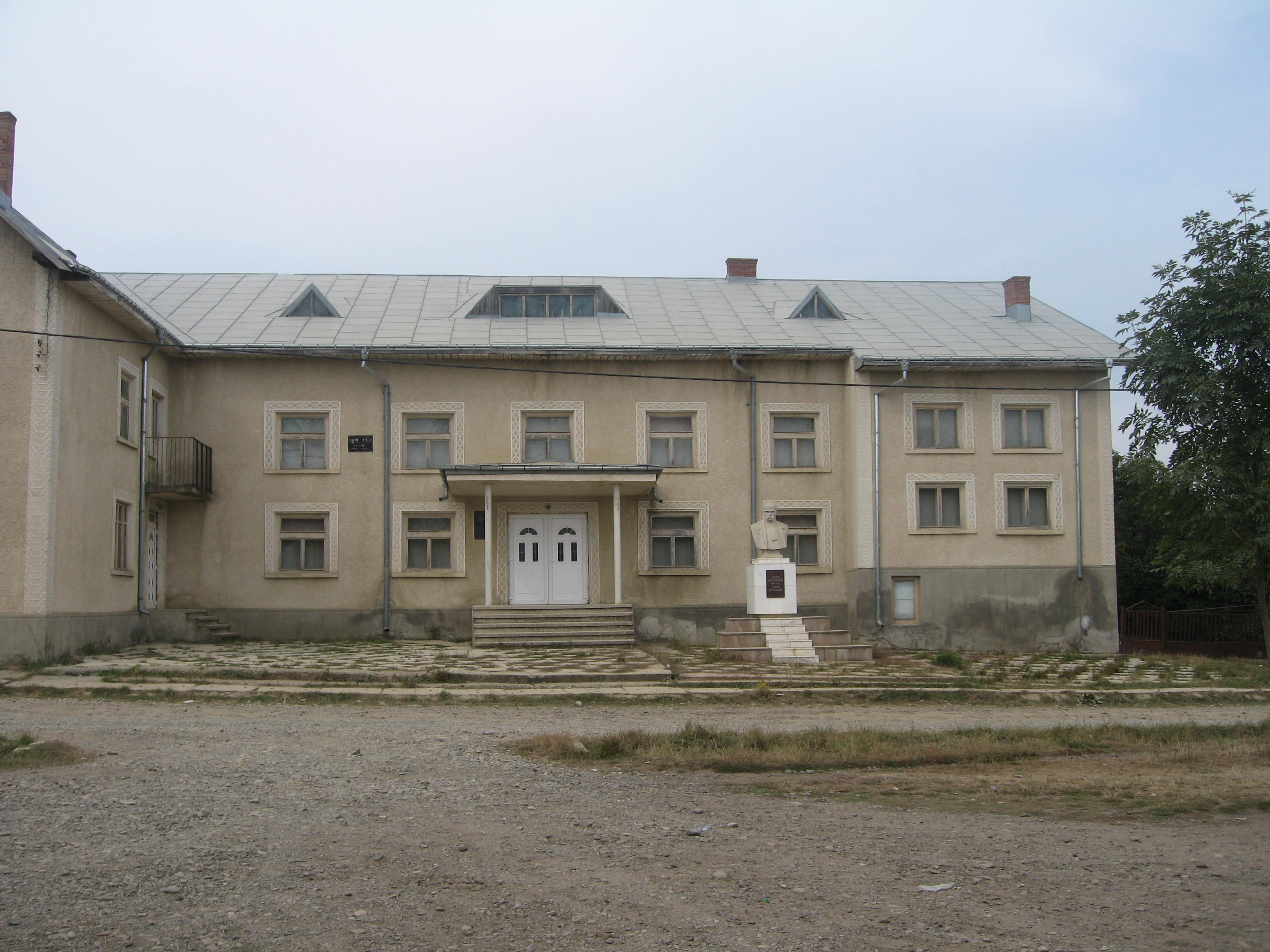
Negostina's cultural center.

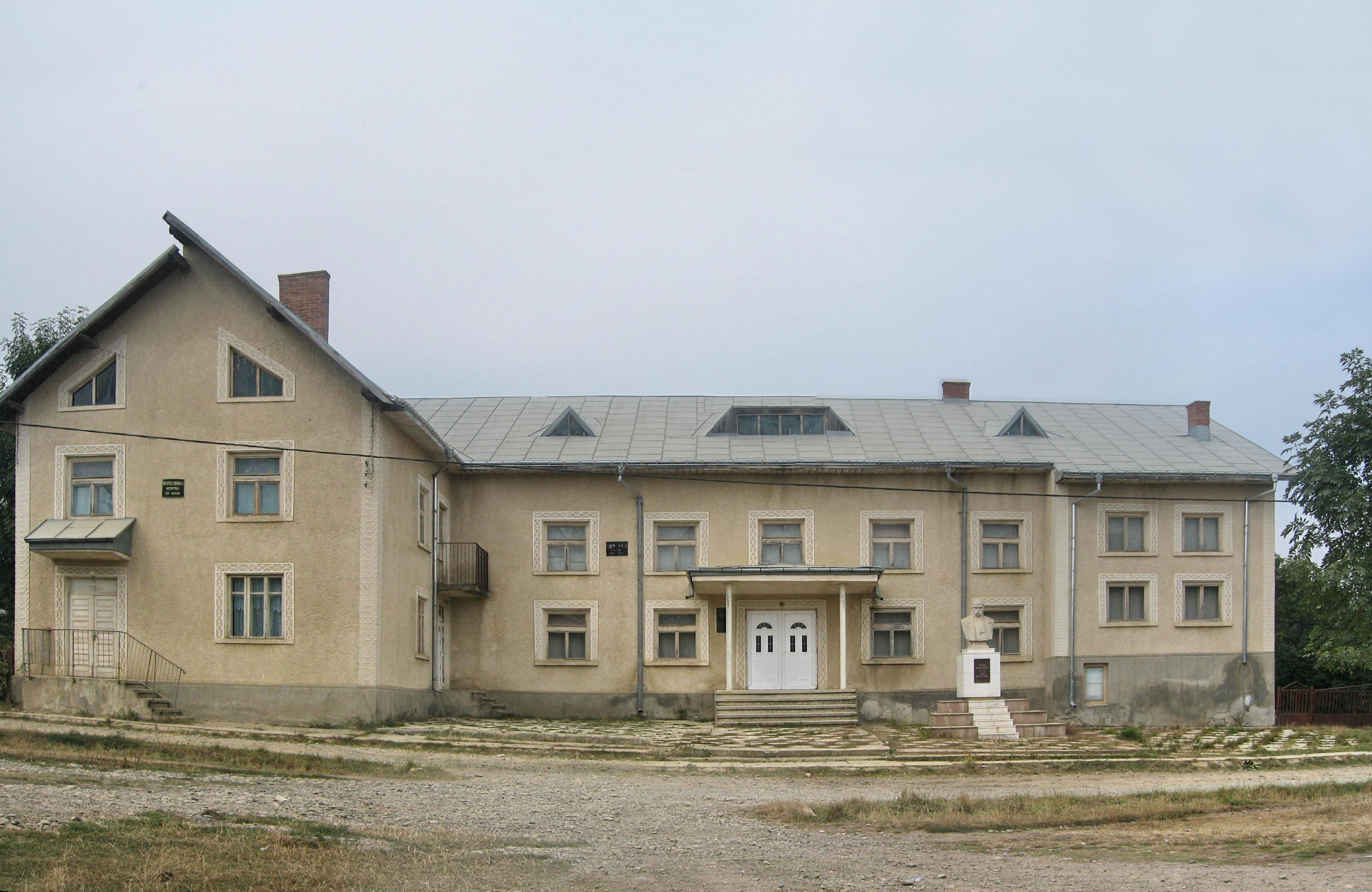
Building in Negostina.
