= .ro =

Internet country code top-level domain for Romania

- Introduced: 26 February 1993
- TLD type: Country code top-level domain
- Status: Active
- Registry: RNC
- Sponsor: National Institute for R&D in Informatics
- Intended use: Entities connected with Romania
- Actual use: Very popular in Romania
- Registered domains: 598,068 (30 April 2019)
- Registration restrictions: None for .ro, some second-level domains are reserved, e.g. .com.ro, .org.ro, and special rules apply for them
- Structure: Registrations are allowed at the second level, and also at the third level under generic-category 2nd level domains
- Documents: Registration agreement
- Dispute policies: UDRP
- DNSSEC: Yes
- Registry website: rotld.ro

.ro is the Internet country code top-level domain (ccTLD) for Romania. It is administered by the National Institute for R&D in Informatics. As of December 2007, about 250,000 domains were registered under the .ro domain. In June 2008 there were around 6.8 million Google results for the .ro domain. In June 2012, there were 732,867 .ro domain names, while in September 2017, there were 928,357.
