= Breaza, Suceava =

Breaza
- Commune
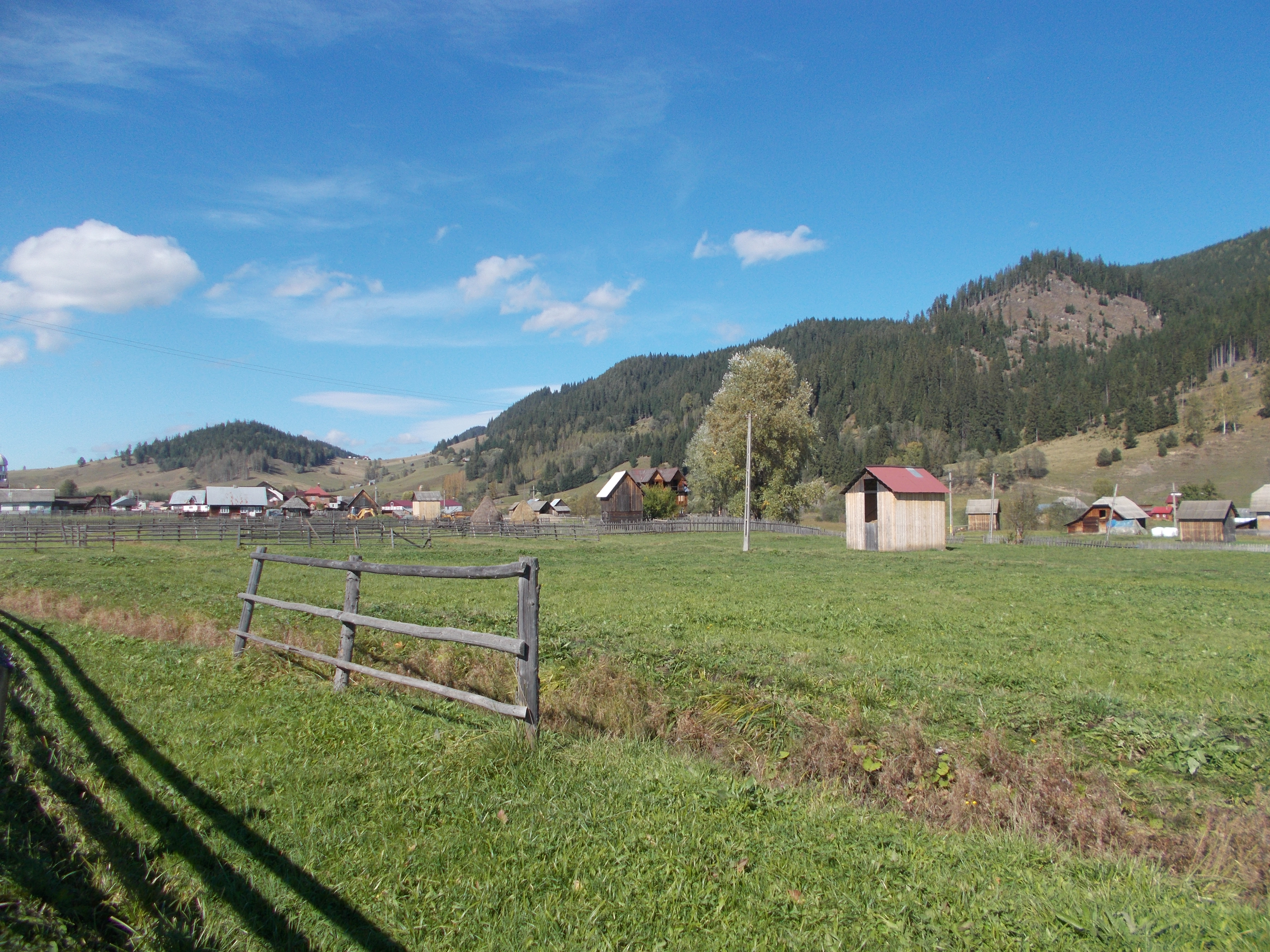

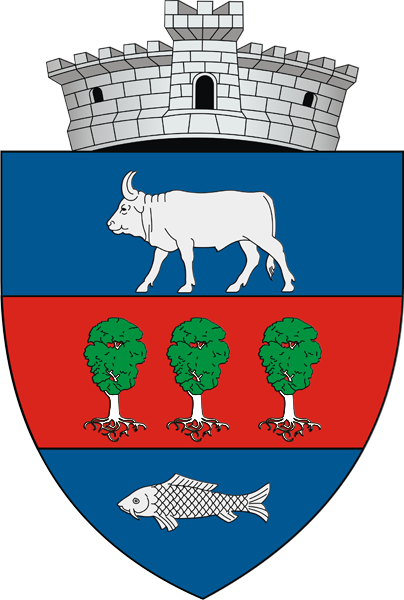
- Coat of arms

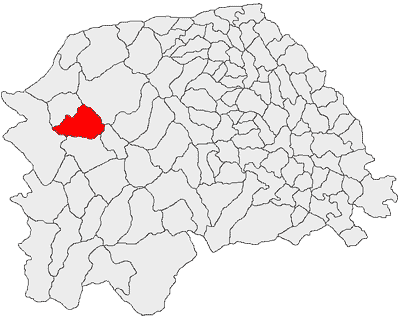
- Location in Suceava County

- Location in Romania
- Coordinates: 47°37′N 25°20′E
- Country: Romania
- County: Suceava
- Subdivisions: Breaza, Breaza de Sus, Pârâu Negrei

Government
  - Mayor (2024–2028): Gheorghe Lesenciuc (PSD)
- Area: 84 km^{2} (32 sq mi)
- Elevation: 913 m (2,995 ft)
- Population (2021-12-01): 1,360
  - Density: 16/km^{2} (42/sq mi)
- Time zone: UTC+02:00 (EET)
  - Summer (DST): UTC+03:00 (EEST)
- Postal code: 727055
- Area code: +40 x30
- Vehicle reg.: SV

Breaza is a commune located in Suceava County, Romania. It is composed of three villages: Breaza, Breaza de Sus and Pârâu Negrei.

The commune shares its name with Breaza, Prahova County, its name being derived from a Slavic word, breza, meaning "birch tree".

Breaza is located at a distance of 359 km north of Bucharest, 69 km west of Suceava.

== Population ==
The commune includes the following villages:

- Breaza (1159 inhabitants)
- Breaza de Sus (333 inhabitants)
- Pârâu Negrei (198 inhabitants)

According to the 2002 census, there were 1,690 people living in the commune, all of them Romanians. According to the 2011 census, 98.88% are Romanians and 0.86% of unknown ethnicity. All the inhabitants of the commune called Romanian their native language.

As of religion, the composition of the population of the commune today is: 99.1% Orthodox, 0.7% Adventeists, 0.2% Pentecostals.
