= Teșna =

Teșna may refer to the following places in Romania:

- Teșna, a village in Coșna Commune, Suceava County
- Teșna, a village in Poiana Stampei Commune, Suceava County
- Teșna (river), a tributary of the Coșna in Suceava County
