= Vatra Dornei Casino =

Heritage site in Suceava County, Romania

- Cazinoul Băilor (Romanian)
- Cazinoul din Vatra Dornei
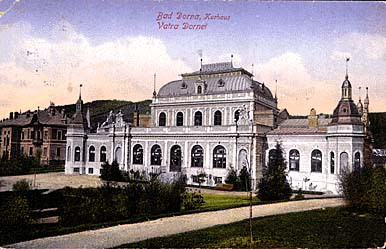

- Vatra Dornei Casino
- 47°20′41.9″N 25°21′18.3″E
- Location: Suceava County, southern Bukovina, Romania
- Nearest city: Vatra Dornei

History
- Built: 1898
- Built for: General Use
- Original use: Casino

Site notes
- Architect: Peter Paul Brang
- Architectural styles: Eclectic; Revival Renaissance
- Restored: 2019-2023
- Current use: Museum, cultural centre
- Governing body: Ministry of Culture and National Patrimony (Romania)
- Owner: Romanian Orthodox Church Fund of Bucovina
- Website: https://cazinoul-bailor.ro/

Monument istoric
- Type: Architectural Monument of National Interest
- Designated: 2004
- Part of: National Register of Historic Monuments (Romanian: Lista Monumentelor Istorice (LMI))
- Reference no.: SV-II-m-A-05670

The Therapeutic Baths' Casino of Vatra Dornei, also known as the Vatra Dornei Casino (Cazinoul Băilor or Cazinoul din Vatra Dornei in Romanian), is an historic monument located in Suceava County, in the historical region of Bukovina, northern Romania in the town of Vatra Dornei. It was built in 1898 by Austrian architect Peter Paul Brang while the territory was part of Austria-Hungary (more specifically the Austrian-ruled part or Cisleithania). It is located on the Dorna River.

It was initially constructed as an entertainment venue for tourists of Austria-Hungary who would flock to the nearby therapeutic baths. The baths offered mineral water treatments, carbonic acid baths, and mud wraps for visitors while the nearby casino offered poker, craps, and roulette. The casino initially was designed to attract Viennese tourists looking for treatment. Local authorities hired traveling bands from Vienna and the structure itself was built as a sister casino to the current Grand Casino in Baden bei Wien, Austria, mimicking its design. During its heyday, the casino attracted tourists from all over Austria-Hungary, mainly from Vienna, but also Berlin, and Budapest, but also Italian and Jewish travelers.

The casino opened its doors in 1898 and served personalities such as Emperor Franz Joseph and Archduke Franz Ferdinand, but also other regional notables, such as Lucian Blaga, Nicolae Iorga, Corneliu Zelea Codreanu, Nichifor Crainic, Emil Bodnăraș, Eugen Jebeleanu, Zaharia Stancu, and Gheorghe Gheorghiu-Dej. The casino also hosted Soviet generals on their way to Berlin in World War II.

The casino was abandoned and fell into disrepair. In 2023, a four-year programme of restoration works was completed on the building and it was reopened to the public as a museum, exhibition and event venue. The 2024 Economic Forum Moldova was held in the casino.

== History ==
=== Background ===
Joseph II, Holy Roman Emperor, instituted a series of policies between 1765 and 1790 now known as Josephinism, which acted to decentralize church institutions. In essence, this policy prohibited local churches from speaking directly to the Curia in Rome or other centralized bodies as with Orthodox churches. Practicing Jews of Bukovina were also targeted by the occupying Monarchs. The consequence of the policy was the bankruptcy and shuttering of over 800 monasteries and local churches and the forfeiture of their funds and vast properties to the government. It also resulted in the centralization of active church property. The newly acquired funds and properties were turned into public, secular church-fund bureaucracies (in German: Religionsfonds) resulting in the creation of 1,700 new welfare institutions and parishes.

After the annexation of Bukovina by the Habsburg monarch from the Principality of Moldavia in 1775 (which later became part of the Austrian Empire in 1804 and Austria-Hungary in 1867), the monarch appointed Baron Erzenberg as governor over the new military administration of the region. At the time, churches and monasteries owned two-thirds of all wealth and land in Bukovina.

Under the June 19, 1783, imperial decree of Joseph II, the Baron was ordered to begin the centralization of church-owned lands and wealth. The local Eastern Orthodox Eparchy of Bukovina, seated in Chernivtsi, was placed under spiritual jurisdiction of Metropolitanate of Karlovci.

Translated from Romanian, the decree ordered, in part:

fără amânare să se reducă numărul mănăstirilor, iar pământurile şi fondurile să treacă sub povăţuirea stăpânirii împărăteşti şi crăieştii Mării. Averea preoţilor care nu trăiesc în Bucovina să se confişte, iar din întreg fondul care se va forma pe această cale să se întreţină clerul ortodox şi să se creeze cel puţin o şcoală, fie la Cernăuţi, fie la Suceava, iar restul să se întrebuinţeze pentru scopuri folositoare.

Without delay, by order there will be a reduction of the number of monasteries, and the lands and funds will pass under the wisdom and responsibility of the dominion of the Kingdom and in the care of the Monarch. The wealth of priests who do not live in Bucovina are hereby confiscated, and from the entire confiscated church-fund will support the Orthodox clergy but will also create at least one school, either in Chernivtsi or in Suceava, and the rest to remaining church-fund shall be allocated for useful purposes.

The order additionally required the confiscation of wealth from priests who lived outside of Bukovina to establish a school in the territory, either in Chernivtsi or in Suceava. In 1786, the Church-Fund of Bukovina was created from the possessions of the Orthodox churches in the territory, and like similar funds, it was to be a secular institution whose wealth was to be used for public benefit and public reinvestment.

The communal land upon which the Casino resides was old church land managed by the local church-fund bureaucracy known as Fondul Bisericesc al Bucovinei (Church-Fund of Bukovina). A portion of confiscated church money, which was secularized, was used to fund the casino.

In 1805 after a scientific analysis and study of the natural and mineral springs in Vatra Dornei by chemist Hacquette de Nurnberg, Dr. Ignatius Plusch advocated authorities for the construction of public therapeutic baths in Poiana Negrii. In 1810, he proceeded to lobby in Vienna for the Vatra Dornei baths. The land on which the communal therapeutic baths were located was purchased by the secularized church-fund in 1870. For those with extreme illnesses, a 20-cabin property was erected where, later, Hotel Nr. 1 would be built.

=== Casino inauguration and construction ===
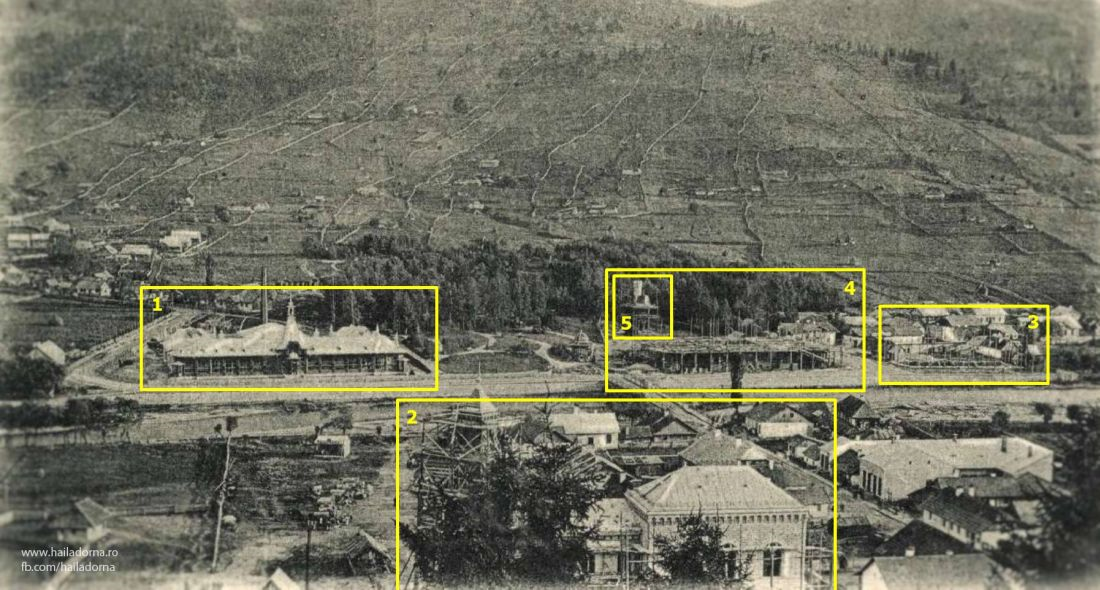
Construction of Vatra Dorna Bath Complex (1. Spa Establishment Building) (2. Vatra Dornei City Hall) (3. Hotel Carol Building) (4. Casino) (5. Spring baths Building)

The casino's existence can be credited to then-mayor Vasile Diac of Vatra Dorna, who initiated and lobbied for the project but later committed suicide by shooting himself over allegations of fraud and theft of city funds. The mayor pitched the project to Emperor Franz Joseph, who approved the works. The casino was to be constructed near the therapeutic baths and built on communal forested land, confiscated from the church. The land required to be deforested. A portion of the money needed to build the casino was appropriated from the Church-fund of Bukovina, raised through fundraisers and community donations, to which Emperor Franz Joseph had also contributed. The remaining portion was borrowed from a bank in Vienna.

Construction of the building began in 1896 by Austrian architect Peter Paul Brang. The building was designed in an eclectic style, with hints of German Renaissance Revival. In 1898, a partial inauguration took place. The official inauguration occurred July 10, 1899 and hosted Emperor Franz Joseph and Arch Duke Ferdinand.

The building opened to serve Viennese tourists, with local authorities using gambling taxes to repay the debt and finance local services. The casino comprised a theatre hall, a library, a restaurant, a confectionery, and public utility spaces. Three large Murano Crystal chandeliers adorned the ceilings, initially being lit by candlelight followed by electrification and lightbulbs. To accommodate the tourists, a train line opened nearby, and wealthy tourists were transported from the train station by coach to the therapeutic baths and to the casino complex.

Local urban myth has it that a secret tunnel was built under the casino to offer an escape route for winners of large sums as a way to avoid robbery and harassment.

=== 20th century ===
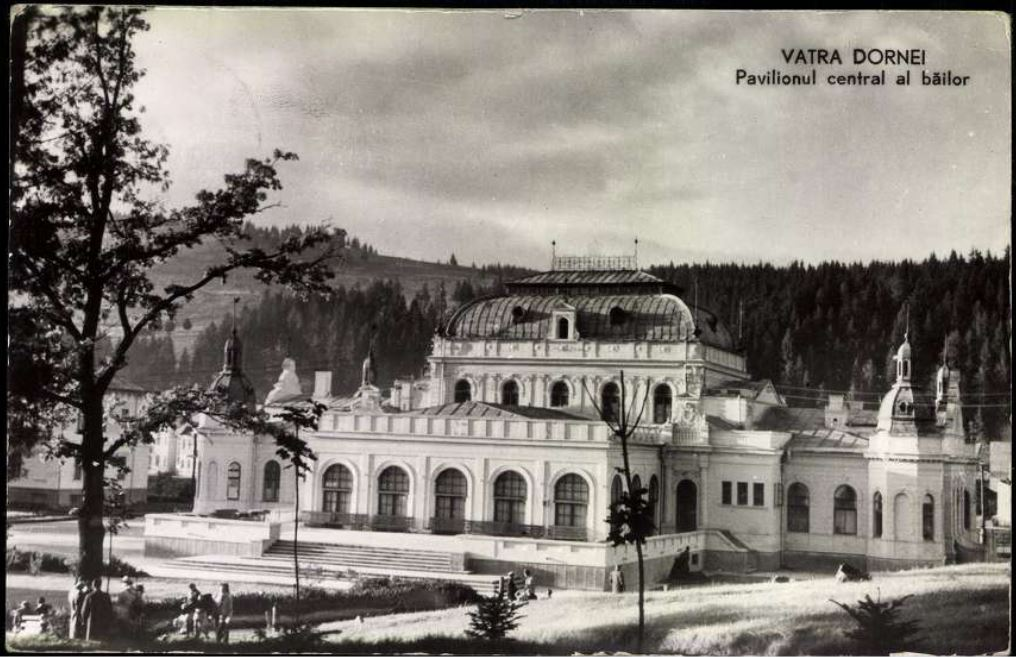
1935 postcard of the Vatra Dornei Casino

After the Great Unification of Romania, where Romania gained possession, amongst other things, of Bukovina, the Austrians were required to pay War Reparations to Romania for World War I. As part of their payment, the Austrians handed over the Church-Fund of Bukovina. The land was reconstituted back to the Metropolis of Moldavia and Bukovina, with administrative rights changing hands several times between the Minister of Agriculture and the church leadership.

The Casino was then known as Central Pavilion of the Therapeutic Baths (Pavilionul Central al Băilor). Since 1936, a number of functional changes of the building have occurred. Due to the functional changes, the artistic imagery in the casino's performance hall was altered. In the back of the casino, a terrace overlooking the Spa Park was completed in 1937.

During World War II, the building was utilized by Nazi armies for military purposes. On the morning of September 29, 1944, during the withdrawal of German military units from Vatra Dornei, the casino building, and especially the inner spaces, suffered significant damage. In the spring of 1945, a number of repairs were initiated.

After the communists came to power in Romania, the casino property was nationalized and turned into a workers club, which combined propaganda, educational, and community center functions (similar to the Melnikov Clubs such as Rusakov Workers Club). Party meetings would be held in the club, local syndicate meetings, local communist committee functions, but also host the National Chess Championship of Communist Romania.

In the early part of 1986, extensive restoration and renovation work of the surrounding perimeter had started; the street from the Dorna River was transformed into a boulevard. According to the statements of Ioan Cornețchi, former mayor of Vatra Dornei between 1986 and 1989, Dictator Nicolae Ceaușescu approved the remake of the casino in 1987. The work had to be completed within three years, and host the Ceaușescu's 1990 New Year Celebration, which never occurred due to the Romanian revolution.

After the country fell into economic paralysis in the wake of the 1989 Revolution, the interior of the casino was pillaged. According to local records, after the first three months of the fall of communism, all chandeliers were stolen, copper tubs and plumbing was taken, the interior was stripped of metal, the Carrara marblework was taken, all decorative crystal glasses, windows, and kitchenware were taken. Work therefore ceased on the casino.

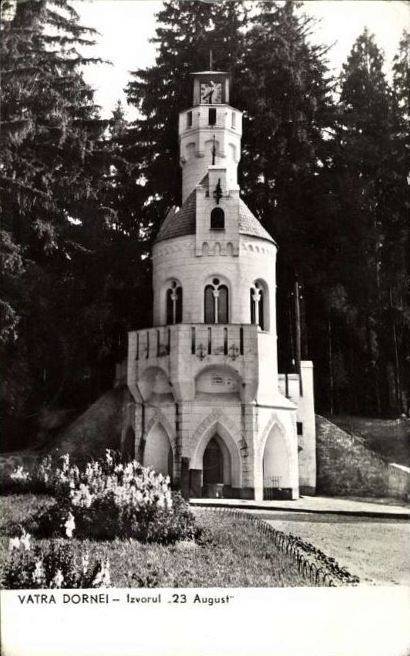
"August 23" Spring at the Therapeutic Bath Complex of Vatra Dornei

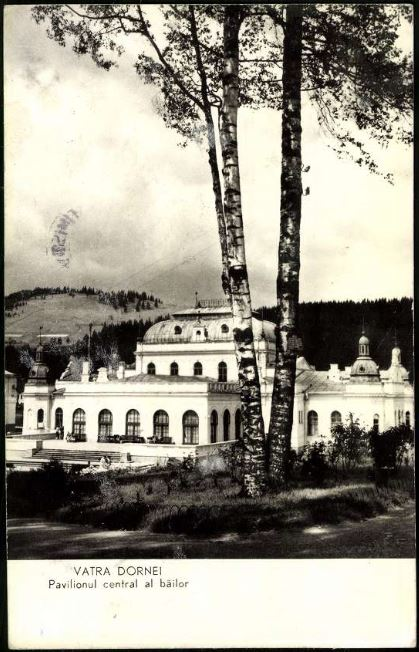
Central Pavilion of the Therapeutic Baths (Pavilionul Central al Băilor)

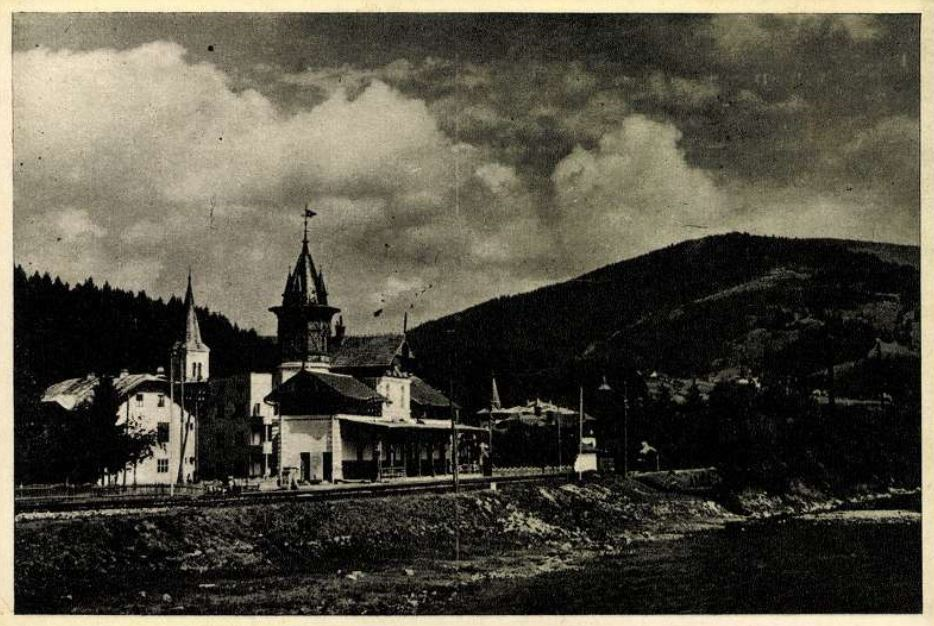
Vatra Dornei Baths- Train Line

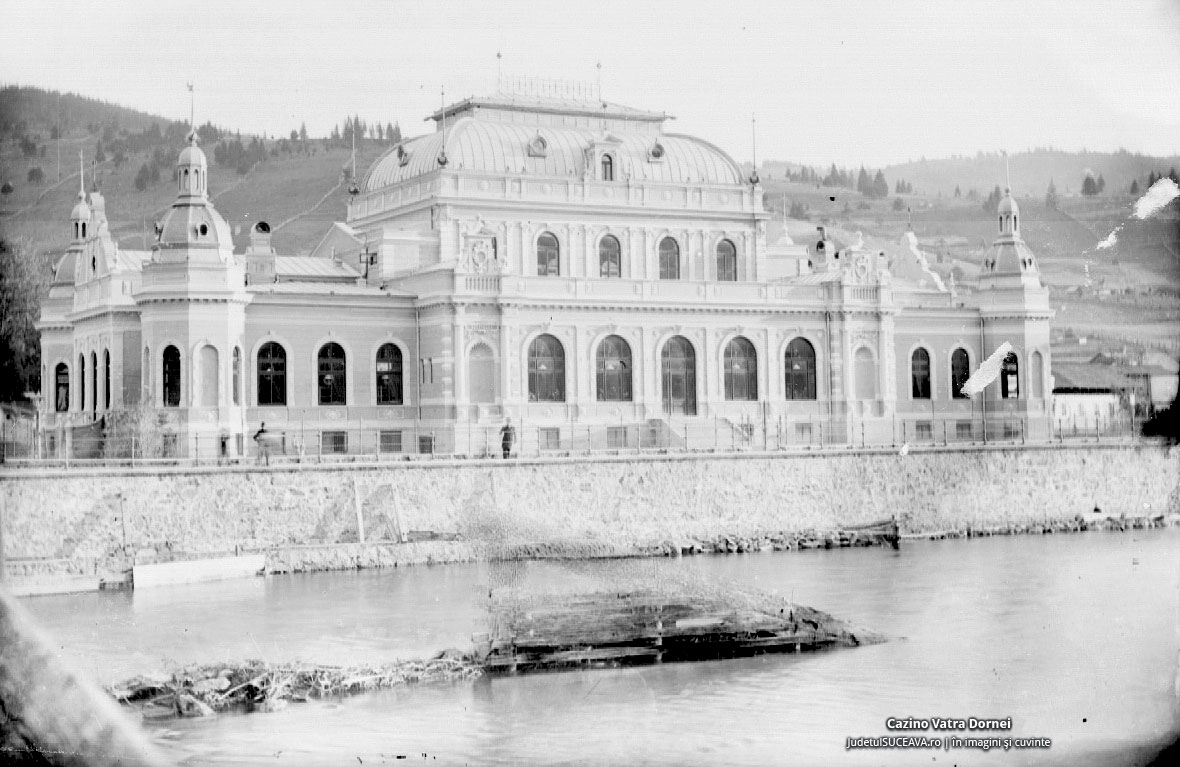
Vatra Dornei Casino

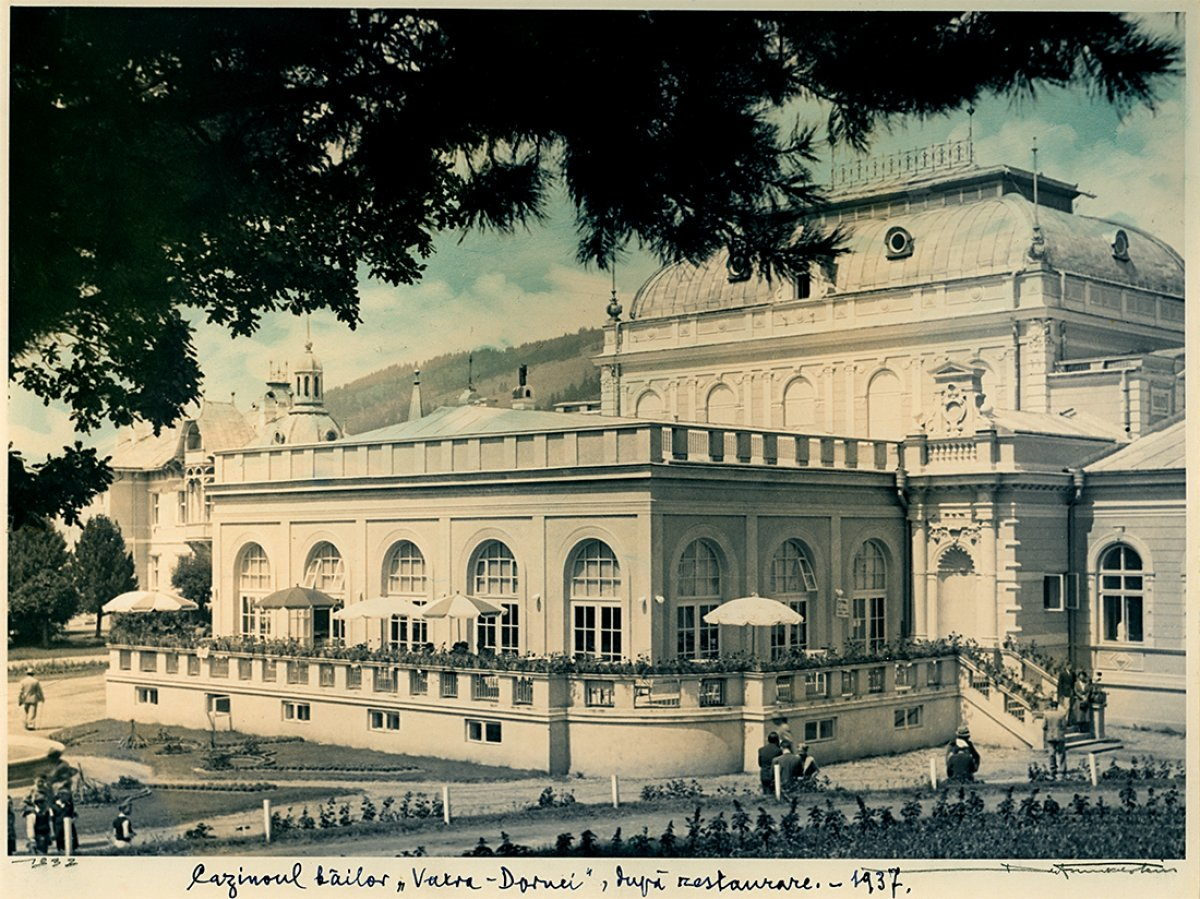
Interbellum Casino of Vatra Dornei

=== Post-communist era ===
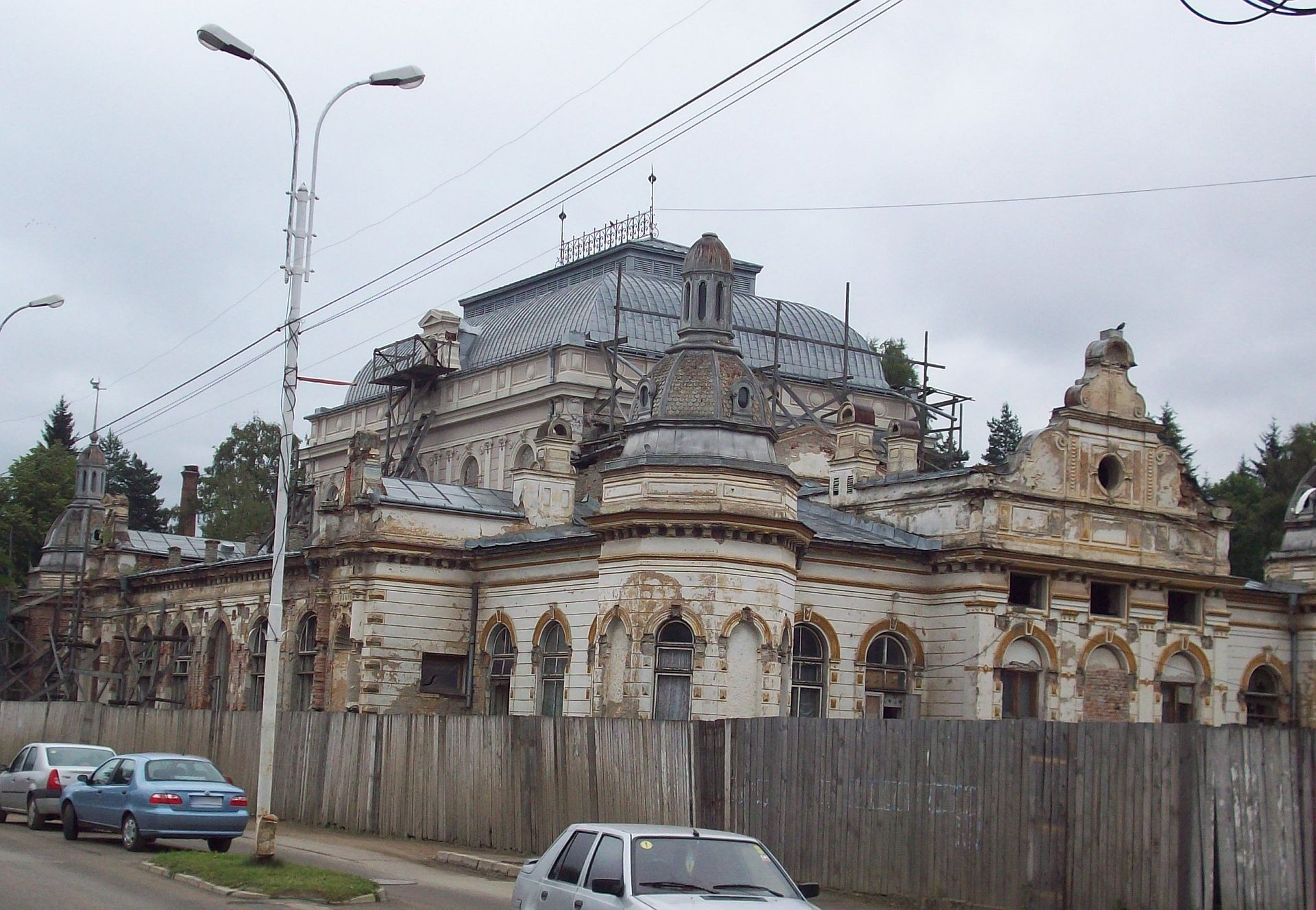
Vatra Dornei Casino in 2008

After 1990, the casino was in the care of the Dorna Turism SA society. Then, by Government decision, in 1995, the building was transferred to the Local Council of Vatra Dornei. The council managed to approve a project in 1998, with funds from the Ministry of Culture and Cults (Ministerul Culturii și Cultelor) for the rehabilitation of the building, and local authorities spent huge amounts for the foundation and substructure. In 1998, at the initiative of Mayor John Moraru, the city Council of Vatra Dornei decided to establish the Vatra Dornei Casino Foundation in order to find the necessary financial resources for restoration and consolidation of the casino.

However, in January 2003, the Archdiocese of Suceava and Rădăuți, as the legal administrator and successor of the church-fund of Bucovina (Romanian Orthodox Church fund in Bucovina) created on June 19, 1783, claimed the casino building.

On October 14, 2004, Government Decision No. 437 restituted the Casino, the Infectious Diseases building, and a building at the base of Runc Hill, to the Archdiocese, following an investigation by the Special Commission for Restitution of Religious Property. Due to Property Restitution Laws in Romania, the Romanian Orthodox Church is one of the largest owners and administrators of historical heritage sites.

At the time the building was returned, local priest Mihai Valică of the Holy Trinity Church in Vatra Dornei threatened state authorities with lawsuits for allowing the destruction of buildings. A contract was signed December 2017 to fund the rehabilitation of the Casino with European Funds and turn it into a Museum. It was signed in the presence of Director of Regional Development for North East Romania, Vasile Abu, and the Archbishop of Suceava and Rădăuți.
