= Siminoc River =

Siminoc River may refer to:

- Siminoc, a tributary of the Danube–Black Sea Canal in Constanța County, Romania
- Siminoc, a tributary of the Teșna in Bistrița-Năsăud County, Romania
