= Pietriș River =

Pietriș River may refer to the following rivers in Romania:

- Pietriș, a tributary of the Coșna in Suceava County
- Pietriș, a tributary of the Tinoasa in Teleorman County
- Pietriș, a tributary of the Mureș in Mureș County
