= Diaca River =

Diaca River may refer to:

- Diaca, a tributary of the Bistrița in Suceava County, Romania
- Diaca, a tributary of the Coșna in Suceava County, Romania
