= Ciotina River =

Ciotina River may refer to:

- Ciotina River (Bistrița)
- Ciotina, a tributary of the Bancu in Suceava County

== See also ==
- Ciotorogu River
