= Silvestru River =

Silvestru River may refer to:

- Silvestru, a tributary of the Băncușor in Suceava County, Romania
- Silvestru, a tributary of the Horăița in Neamț County, Romania
