= Grebla River =

Grebla River may refer to:

- Grebla, a tributary of the Dornișoara in Suceava County
- Grebla, a tributary of the Băiaș in Vâlcea County
