= Coșna (river) =

Coșna Bancu, Coșnița
- Location within Romania

Location
- Country: Romania
- Counties: Suceava County

Physical characteristics
- Mouth: Bancu
  - coordinates: 47.4181°N 25.1830°E
- Length: 14 km (8.7 mi)
- Basin size: 59 km^{2} (23 sq mi)

Basin features
- Progression: Bancu→ Teșna→ Dorna→ Bistrița→ Siret→ Danube→ Black Sea

The Coșna (in its upper course also Coșnița) is a right tributary of the river Bancu in Romania. It flows into the Bancu near Valea Bancului. Its length is 14 km (8.7 mi) and its basin size is 59 km^{2} (23 sq mi).

== Tributaries ==
The following rivers are tributaries to the river Coșna (from source to mouth):

- Left: Dieciu, Pietriș, Diaca, Vâlta
- Right: Zimbroaia, Netedu
