= Bancu (river) =

- Location within Romania

Location
- Country: Romania
- Counties: Suceava
- Villages: Valea Bancului

Physical characteristics
- Source: Suhard Mountains
- Mouth: Teșna
  - location: Românești
  - coordinates: 47.3680°N 25.1790°E
- Length: 12 km (7.5 mi)
- Basin size: 101 km^{2} (39 sq mi)

Basin features
- Progression: Teșna→ Dorna→ Bistrița→ Siret→ Danube→ Black Sea
- Tributaries
  - left: Prislop, Făgețel, Ciotina
  - right: Silvestru, Coșna

The Bancu (in its upper course: Băncușor) is a left tributary of the river Teșna in Romania. It flows into the Teșna in Românești. Its length is 12 km (7.5 mi) and its basin size is 101 km^{2} (39 sq mi).
