= Dorna Candrenilor =

- Commune
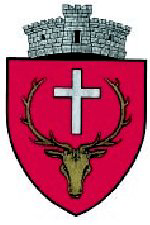
- Coat of arms

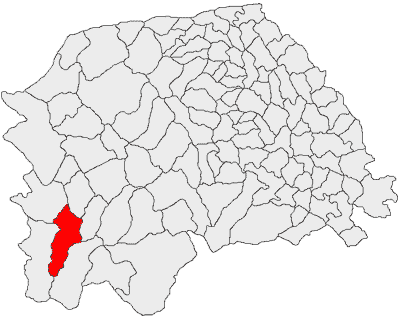
- Location in Suceava County

- Location in Romania
- Coordinates: 47°21′N 25°15′E
- Country: Romania
- County: Suceava

Government
  - Mayor (2020–2024): Dănuț Candrea (PSD)
- Area: 221.29 km^{2} (85.44 sq mi)
- Elevation: 825 m (2,707 ft)
- Population (2021-12-01): 2,966
  - Density: 13.40/km^{2} (34.71/sq mi)
- Time zone: UTC+02:00 (EET)
  - Summer (DST): UTC+03:00 (EEST)
- Postal code: 727190
- Area code: +(40) 230
- Vehicle reg.: SV
- Website: primaria-dornacandrenilor.ro

Dorna Candrenilor (German: Dorna Kandreny; Hungarian: Dornakandren) is a commune located in Suceava County, in the historical region of Bukovina, northeastern Romania. It is composed of three villages: Dealu Floreni, Dorna Candrenilor, and Poiana Negrii. It included five other villages until 2003, when these were split off to form Coșna commune.

The commune is situated in the Moldavian Subcarpathians, at an altitude of 825 m (2,707 ft), on the banks of the river Dorna and its right tributary, the Negrișoara. It is located in the southwestern part of the county, 8 km (5 mi) west of the city of Vatra Dornei and 116 km (72 mi) southwest of the county seat, Suceava. Dorna Candrenilor is traversed east to west by national road DN17 (part of European route E58), which starts in Suceava and ends in Dej. The village of Poiana Negrii is also part of the Via Transilvanica long-distance trail.

At the 2021 census, the commune had a population of 2,966; of those, 94.74% were Romanians.

There is a small aerodrome in Dealu Floreni. Two well-known Romanian brands of mineral water, more specifically Dorna and Poiana Negrii, trace their name from this area.

== Natives ==
- Vladimir Todașcă (born 1957), biathlete
