= Alfred Kuzmany =

- Born: 24 October 1893
- Died: 4 October 1961 (aged 67)
- Military career
- Allegiance: Nazi Germany
- Branch: Army
- Rank: Generalmajor
- Conflicts: World War II
- Awards: Knight's Cross of the Iron Cross

Alfred Kuzmany (born 24 October 1893 in Dorna-Watra, Bukovina, Austria-Hungary–4 October 1961) was a general in the Wehrmacht of Nazi Germany during World War II. He was a recipient of the Knight's Cross of the Iron Cross.

== Awards and decorations ==
- Knight's Cross of the Iron Cross on 2 February 1942 as Oberstleutnant and commander of Infanterie-Regiment 338
