= Negrișoara (Dorna) =

- Location within Romania

Location
- Country: Romania
- Counties: Suceava County
- Villages: Poiana Negrii

Physical characteristics
- Source: Călimani Mountains
- Mouth: Dorna
  - location: Dorna Candrenilor
  - coordinates: 47.3548°N 25.2406°E
- Length: 21 km (13 mi)
- Basin size: 95 km^{2} (37 sq mi)

Basin features
- Progression: Dorna→ Bistrița→ Siret→ Danube→ Black Sea
- Tributaries
  - right: Pânți, Gligul, Piatra

The Negrișoara is a right tributary of the river Dorna in Romania. It flows into the Dorna in Dorna Candrenilor. Its length is 21 km (13 mi) and its basin size is 95 km^{2} (37 sq mi).
