= Dornișoara =

- Location within Romania

Location
- Country: Romania
- Counties: Bistrița-Năsăud, Suceava
- Villages: Căsoi

Physical characteristics
- Mouth: Dorna
  - location: Poiana Stampei
  - coordinates: 47.3081°N 25.1349°E
- Length: 18 km (11 mi)
- Basin size: 47 km^{2} (18 sq mi)

Basin features
- Progression: Dorna→ Bistrița→ Siret→ Danube→ Black Sea
- Tributaries
  - left: Pârâul Ioniță, Trifon, Grebla

The Dornișoara is a left tributary of the river Dorna in Romania. It flows into the Dorna in Poiana Stampei. Its length is 18 km (11 mi) and its basin size is 47 km^{2} (18 sq mi).
