= Poiana Stampei =

- Commune
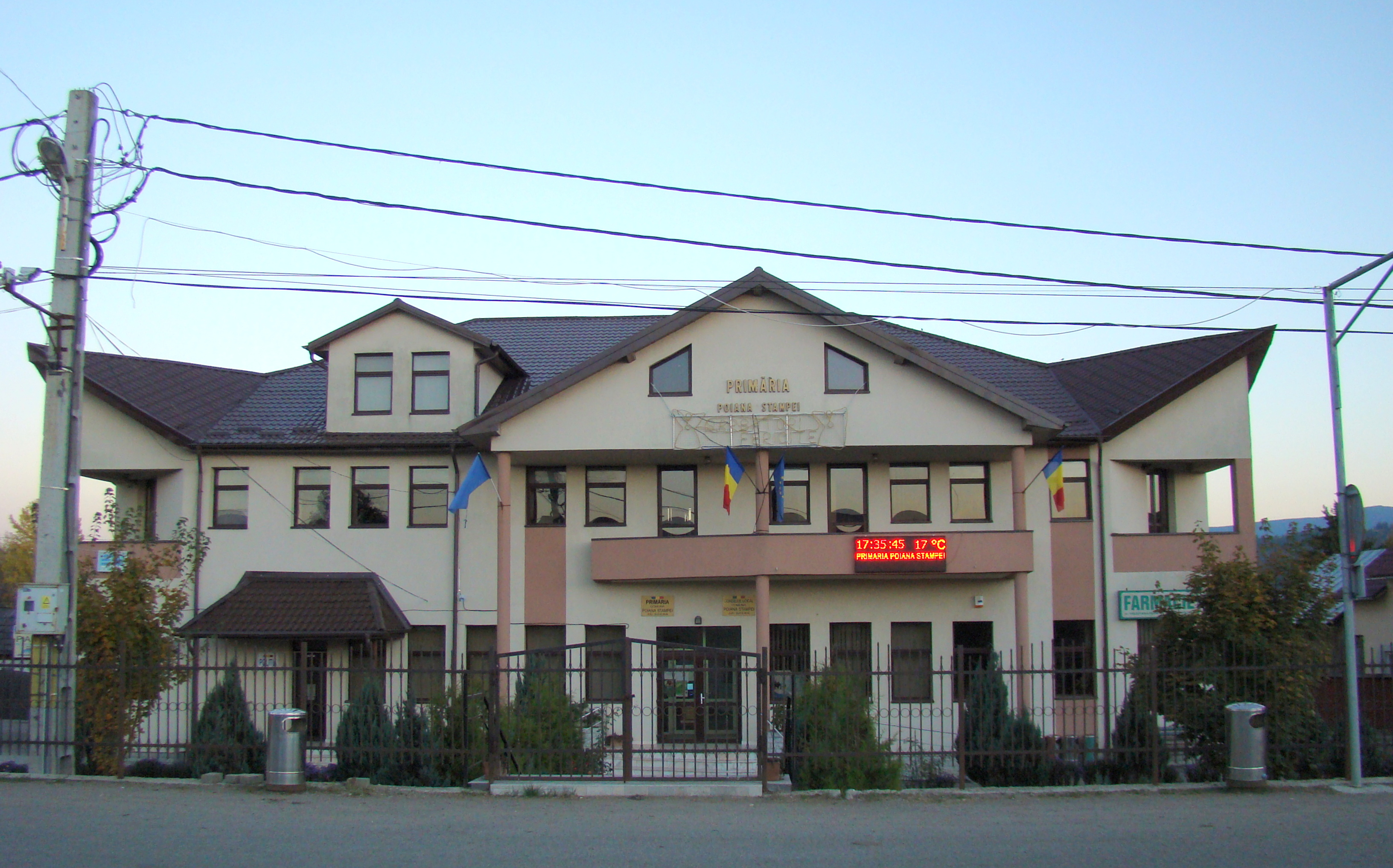
- The town hall of Poiana Stampei

- Coat of arms

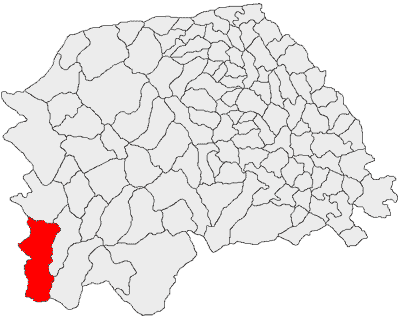
- Location in Suceava County

- Location in Romania
- Coordinates: 47°19′N 25°8′E
- Country: Romania
- County: Suceava

Government
  - Mayor (2020–2024): Viluț Mezdrea (PSD)
- Area: 180.76 km^{2} (69.79 sq mi)
- Elevation: 911 m (2,989 ft)
- Population (2021-12-01): 2,119
  - Density: 11.72/km^{2} (30.36/sq mi)
- Time zone: UTC+02:00 (EET)
  - Summer (DST): UTC+03:00 (EEST)
- Postal code: 727430
- Area code: +(40) 230
- Vehicle reg.: SV
- Website: www.poianastampei.ro

Poiana Stampei (German: Pojana Stampi) is a commune located in Suceava County, in the historical region of Bukovina, northeastern Romania. It is composed of seven villages: Căsoi, Dornișoara, Pilugani, Poiana Stampei, Prăleni, Tătaru, and Teșna.

The commune is situated in the Bukovinian Subcarpathians, at an altitude of 911 m (2,989 ft), on the banks of the river Dorna and its left tributary, the Dornișoara. It is located at the southeastern extremity of Suceava County, on the old border between Moldavia and Transylvania, on the southern ridges of the historical region of Bukovina. The city of Vatra Dornei is 20 km (12 mi) to the east, while the county seat, Suceava, is 128 km (80 mi) to the northeast.

Poiana Stampei is crossed east to west by national road DN17 (part of European route E58), which starts in Suceava, crosses the Carpathian Mountains at the nearby Tihuța Pass into Harghita County, and ends in Dej, Cluj County. In addition, the commune is part of the Via Transilvanica long-distance trail.

Poiana Stampei was first mentioned in documents in 1593, during the reign of Moldavian Prince Aaron the Tyrant. In the past, the commune was inhabited by a small German minority, more specifically by Bukovina Germans. At the 1930 Romanian census, the Bukovina German minority of Poiana Stampei accounted for 4.15% of the total population of the commune.
