= Teșna (river) =

- Location within Romania

Location
- Country: Romania
- Counties: Bistrița-Năsăud, Suceava
- Villages: Tătaru, Teșna, Românești

Physical characteristics
- Source: Suhard Mountains
- Mouth: Dorna
  - location: Podu Coșnei
  - coordinates: 47.3592°N 25.1898°E
- Length: 22 km (14 mi)
- Basin size: 212 km^{2} (82 sq mi)

Basin features
- Progression: Dorna→ Bistrița→ Siret→ Danube→ Black Sea
- Tributaries
  - left: Siminic, Cucureasa, Tebeleuca, Teșna Mică, Bancu

The Teșna is a left tributary of the river Dorna in Romania. It flows into the Dorna in Podu Coșnei. Its length is 22 km (14 mi) and its basin size is 212 km^{2} (82 sq mi).
