= Vatra Dornei =

- Municipality
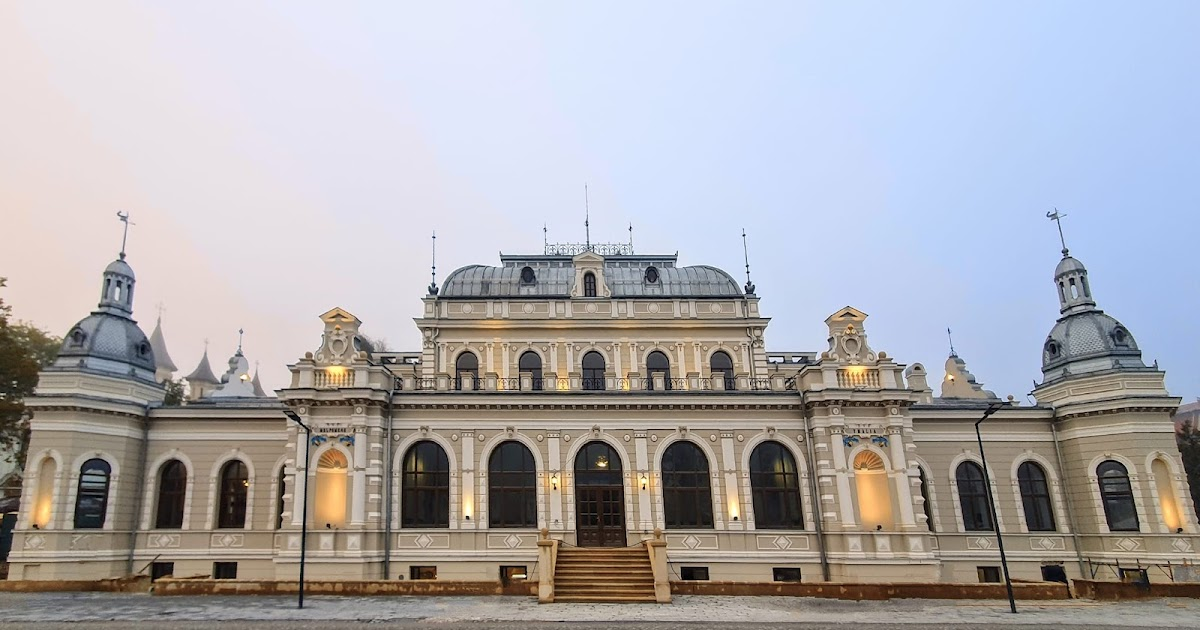
- Vatra Dornei Casino

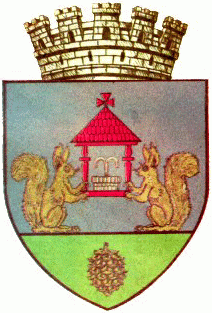
- Coat of arms

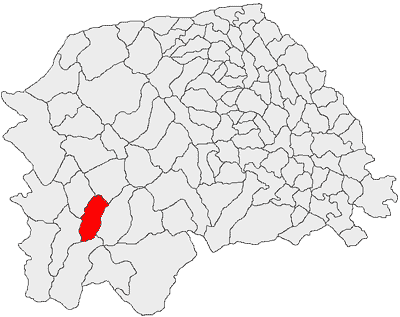
- Location in Suceava County

- Location in Romania
- Coordinates: 47°20′46″N 25°21′34″E
- Country: Romania
- County: Suceava

Government
  - Mayor (2024–2028): Marius-Vasile Rîpan (PNL)
- Area: 144.34 km^{2} (55.73 sq mi)
- Elevation: 802 m (2,631 ft)
- Population (2021-12-01): 12,578
  - Density: 87.141/km^{2} (225.70/sq mi)
- Time zone: UTC+02:00 (EET)
  - Summer (DST): UTC+03:00 (EEST)
- Postal code: 725700
- Area code: (+40) 0230
- Vehicle reg.: SV
- Website: primariavatradornei.ro

Vatra Dornei (Romanian pronunciation: [ˌvatra ˈdornej]; German: Dorna Watra; Hungarian: Dornavátra; Yiddish: דאָרנע, romanized: Dorne) is a city in Suceava County, north-eastern Romania. It is situated in the historical region of Bukovina and Western Moldavia. Vatra Dornei is the fifth largest urban settlement in the county, with a population of 12,578 inhabitants, according to the 2021 census.

It was declared a city in 2000, being the newest and smallest in the county. The city administers three villages: Argestru (German: Ardzestru), Roșu, and Todireni. Vatra Dornei is a well known spa and ski resort in the Carpathian Mountains and also is home to the historic Vatra Dornei Casino.

== Administration and local politics ==
=== Town council ===
The town's former local council had the following political composition, according to the results of the 2020 Romanian local elections:

Party	Seats	Current Council
National Liberal Party (PNL)	7	
Social Democratic Party (PSD)	5	
People's Movement Party (PMP)	3	
Save Romania Union (USR)	2	

The town's current council has the following political composition, according to the results of the 2024 Romanian local elections:

Party	Seats	Current Council
National Liberal Party (PNL)	8	
Social Democratic Party (PSD)	7	
Alliance for the Union of Romanians (AUR)	1	
People's Movement Party (PMP)	1	

== Geography ==
Vatra Dornei is located in north-east Romania, in the south-western part of Suceava County, 110 km (68 mi) away from Suceava, the capital of the county. The city of Câmpulung Moldovenesc is 40 km (25 mi) away, the city of Bistrița 85 km (53 mi) away, the town of Gura Humorului 74 km (46 mi) away and the town of Broșteni 52 km (32 mi) away.

Vatra Dornei is at the confluence of the rivers Bistrița and Dorna, in the Dorna Depression. Because of its mountain surroundings, the city is a spa and ski resort, one of the oldest resorts in Romania. Vatra Dornei is connected to the Romanian national railway system and has two railway stations, Vatra Dornei and Vatra Dornei Băi, both historical monuments. The European route E58, that links the region of Moldavia with Transylvania, crosses the city.

== History ==
The earliest written mention of the settlement is from 1592. Together with the rest of Bukovina, Vatra Dornei was under the rule of the Habsburg monarchy (later Austria-Hungary) from 1775 to 1918. This was a period of development for the town, which became a well known resort in the early 19th century. Between 1925 and 1950, Vatra Dornei was part of the former Câmpulung County. From 1950 to present it's part of Suceava County. The historic Vatra Dornei Casino is located in the city center.

== Climate ==
Vatra Dornei has a warm-summer humid continental climate (Köppen: Dfb), with an average annual temperature of 5.1 °C. In August, the average is 17 °C, and in January, it is -5 °C.

Annual precipitation amounts to approximatively 674 mm, with the highest amount in June at 100 mm, and the lowest in February at 28.5 mm. The number of days with snowfall per year is about 120. The longest rainy period recorded in Vatra Dornei was in August 1908 (14 days). The average atmospheric pressure is 690 mm in January and 694 mm in September.

The highest temperature recorded at Vatra Dornei is 36.5 °C (97.7 °F) on 15 August 1957, followed by 36.4 °C (97.5 °F) on 18 July 1904, while the absolute minimum hit −36.5 °C (−33.7 °F) on 13 January 1950.

Climate data for Vatra Dornei (elevation 825 m, 2001–2025 normals, extremes 1961–present)
Month	Jan	Feb	Mar	Apr	May	Jun	Jul	Aug	Sep	Oct	Nov	Dec	Year
Record high °C (°F)	12.3 (54.1)	13.3 (55.9)	21.2 (70.2)	24.5 (76.1)	25.9 (78.6)	29.6 (85.3)	36.4 (97.5)	36.5 (97.7)	29.1 (84.4)	24.9 (76.8)	19.9 (67.8)	12.8 (55.0)	36.5 (97.7)
Mean daily maximum °C (°F)	−1.0 (30.2)	0.8 (33.4)	4.9 (40.8)	10.8 (51.4)	16.1 (61.0)	20.1 (68.2)	22.1 (71.8)	22.2 (72.0)	16.9 (62.4)	11.5 (52.7)	5.9 (42.6)	0.3 (32.5)	10.9 (51.6)
Daily mean °C (°F)	−4.6 (23.7)	−3.4 (25.9)	0.1 (32.2)	5.3 (41.5)	10.5 (50.9)	14.5 (58.1)	16.2 (61.2)	16.2 (61.2)	11.4 (52.5)	6.4 (43.5)	1.9 (35.4)	−3.0 (26.6)	6.0 (42.7)
Mean daily minimum °C (°F)	−8.2 (17.2)	−7.6 (18.3)	−4.6 (23.7)	−0.2 (31.6)	4.8 (40.6)	8.8 (47.8)	10.4 (50.7)	10.1 (50.2)	5.9 (42.6)	1.4 (34.5)	−2.2 (28.0)	−6.3 (20.7)	1.0 (33.8)
Record low °C (°F)	−36.5 (−33.7)	−26.4 (−15.5)	−23.1 (−9.6)	−13.7 (7.3)	−5.9 (21.4)	1.3 (34.3)	2.8 (37.0)	0.6 (33.1)	−3.7 (25.3)	−12.5 (9.5)	−16.6 (2.1)	−21.3 (−6.3)	−36.5 (−33.7)
Average precipitation mm (inches)	32 (1.3)	36 (1.4)	39 (1.5)	52 (2.0)	91 (3.6)	116 (4.6)	112 (4.4)	82 (3.2)	61 (2.4)	46 (1.8)	40 (1.6)	36 (1.4)	743 (29.2)
Average precipitation days (≥ 1.0 mm)	10	9	10	10	15	16	15	11	10	8	9	9	132
Source: Administrația Națională de Meteorologie (MeteoRomania), CC-BY-SA-4.0

== Demographics ==
Historical population
Year	Pop.	±%
1930	9,826	—
1948	7,078	−28.0%
1956	10,822	+52.9%
1966	13,815	+27.7%
1977	15,873	+14.9%
1992	18,488	+16.5%
2002	16,321	−11.7%
2011	14,429	−11.6%
2021	12,578	−12.8%
Source: Romanian census data and/or official estimates

Until the early 1950s, Vatra Dornei had an ethnically mixed population of Romanians, Germans (more specifically Bukovina Germans), Ukrainians, and Jews. The large synagogue and a picturesque Jewish cemetery bear witness to the Jewish presence and historical legacy in the area.

Vatra Dornei reached its peak population in 1992, when about 18,500 people were living within the town limits. Then the city population declined gradually. According to the 2011 census, Vatra Dornei had a total population of 13,659 inhabitants. Of this population, 98.65% are ethnically Romanians, 0.64% Roma, 0.23% Germans (Bukovina Germans), 0.22% Hungarians, and 0.10% Ukrainians.

Vatra Dornei is the fifth most populated urban settlement in Suceava County, after the county capital, Suceava, and the cities of Rădăuți, Fălticeni, and Câmpulung Moldovenesc. Vatra Dornei is also the smallest and newest city in Suceava County.

== Tourism ==
Vatra Dornei is a well known ski resort in the Carpathian Mountains. There are ski slopes nearby the city, attracting tourists in winter season.

The "Dealu Negru" ski slope (sometimes also called the "Telescaun" ski slope) is 3,200 meters long.The slope is served by a chairlift and the ascent takes about 20–25 minutes, during which time mountain lovers can admire the picturesque scenery of the several mountain ranges surrounding the valley. The chairlift operates year-round, but it is most popular in the summer and winter. The “Parc 1” ski slope is 900 meters long and has an elevation difference of approximately 160 meters. It is located in the center of the Vatra Dornei resort, near Central Park, and is one of the most popular slopes in northern Romania. Adjacent to the “Parc” ski slope is the “Poienița” slope (also known as “Parc 2”), which is 550 meters long and has a vertical drop of 100 meters. The slope is the ideal width for beginners and children, with a low level of difficulty. The “Veverița” ski slope is located near the “Parc” slope. It is 780 meters long and has a vertical drop of 180 meters. It is rated as intermediate. In addition to the four alpine schi slopes, there is also the “Dealu Runc” slope, designed for cross-country skiing and located at the upper end of the “Veverița” slope. It is 5,000 meters long and has a low difficulty level, making it ideal for beginners.

Vatra Dornei is surrounded by large forest areas, proper places for practicing alpine tourism. The resort town is surrounded by the forested Giumalău, Bistrița, Călimani, Rodna and Obcina Mestecăniș mountains.

There are mineral water springs in the city limits and its surroundings, that helped the settlement to develop as a spa. In the late 19th century and early 20th century Bukovina had only two spa towns: Vatra Dornei and Solca.

Vatra Dornei has several hotels, two museums (The Ethnographic Museum, which offers an overview of folk art from the mountainous region of Bukovina, and The Museum of Natural Sciences and Cynegetic with two sections, one is related to the Fauna and Flora of the Dorna Region and the other is Cynegetic Section of Suceava County) and a few old buildings that are considered historical and architectural monuments: the casino, the main spa building, the two railway stations, the town hall, Sentinela Spring, the post office building, and a few old churches.

Visitors can explore the surroundings of Vatra Dornei using the chairlift connecting the town to Dealul Negru, or by taking excursions to Poiana Negri and Poiana Stampei, both known for their mineral springs.

Vatra Dornei is also part of the Via Transilvanica long-distance trail.

== Natives ==
- Valentin Buhăcianu (born 1993), footballer
- Robert Candrea (born 1995), footballer
- Vasile Deac (1824–1909), Mayor of Vatra Dornei
- Liliana Ichim (born 1967), alpine skier
- Alfred Kuzmany (1893–1961), army general in the Wehrmacht in World War II
- Bogdan Macovei (born 1983), luger
- Andrei Nilă (born 1985), footballer
- Platon Pardău (1934–2002), poet and writer
- Teodosie Petrescu (born 1955), cleric

== Gallery ==
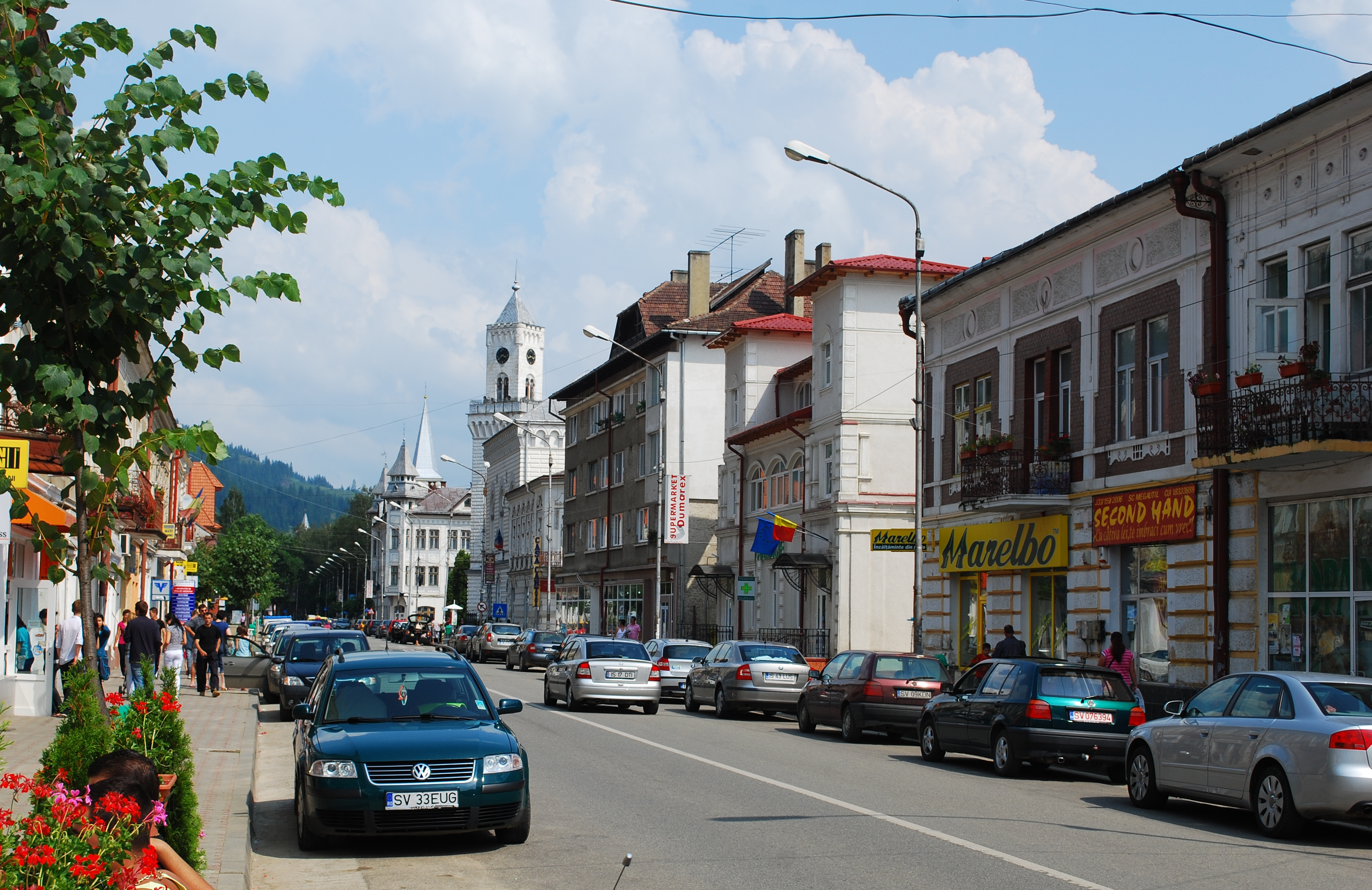
Mihai Eminescu Street

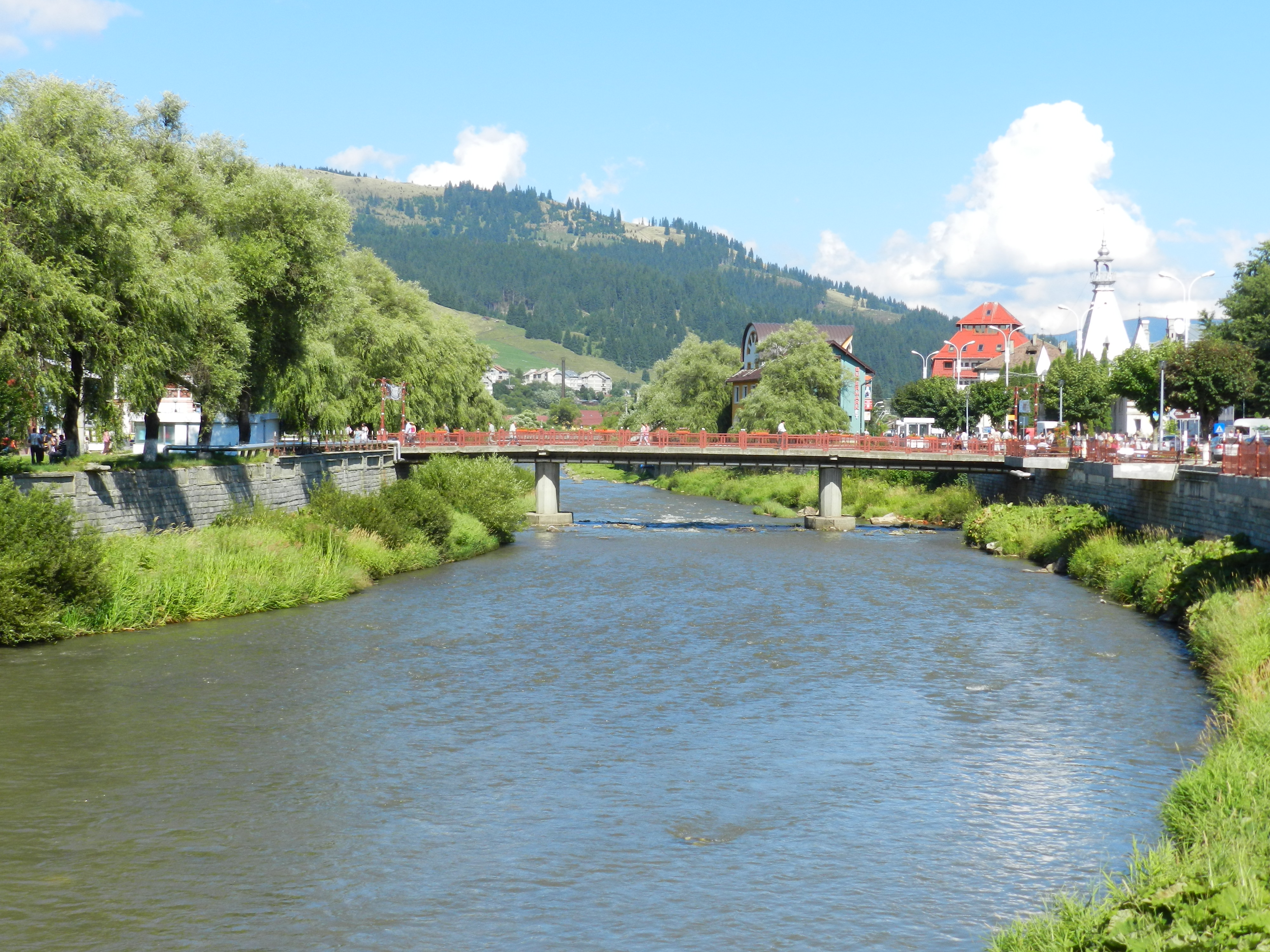
Dorna river

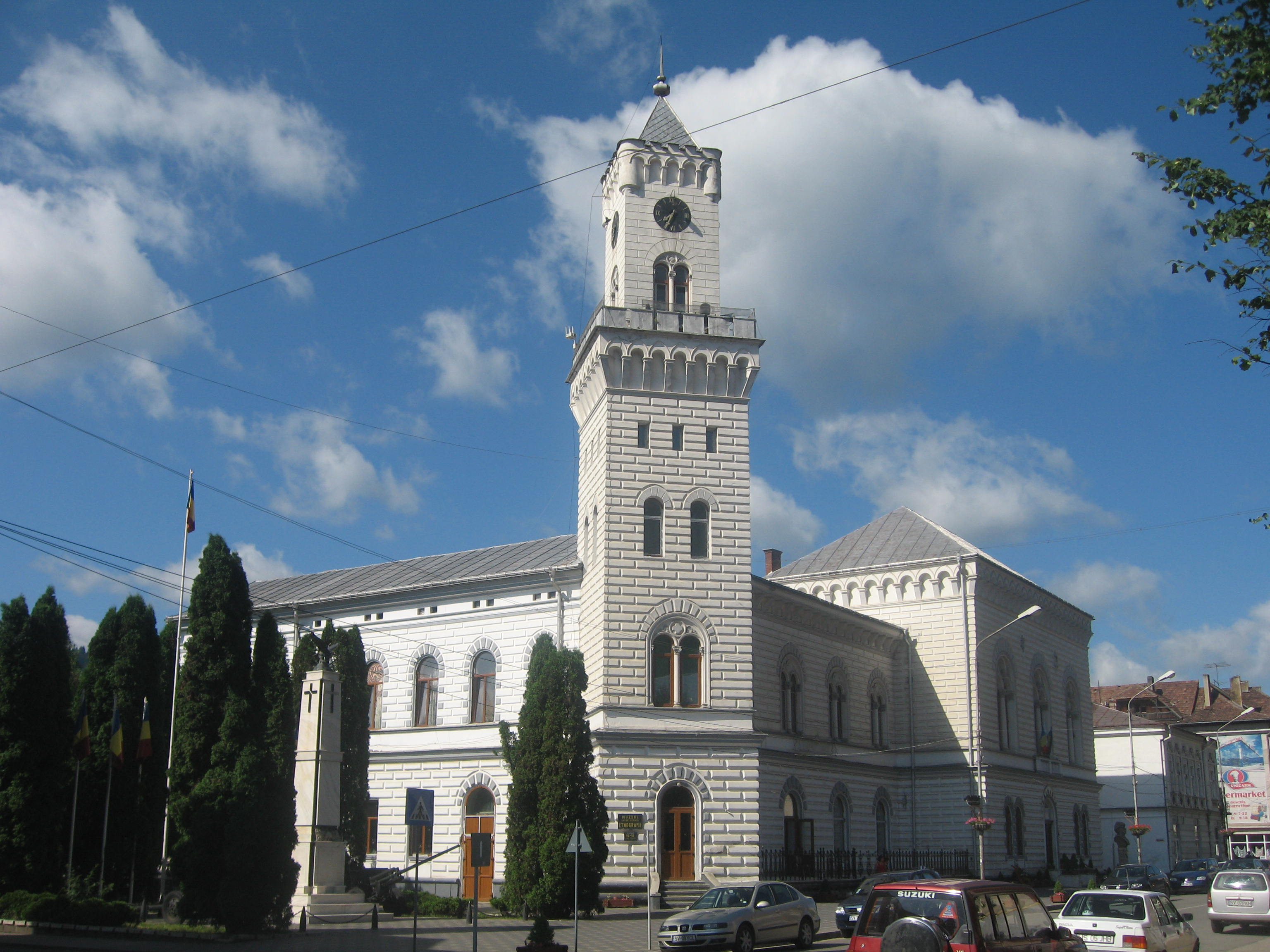
Town hall

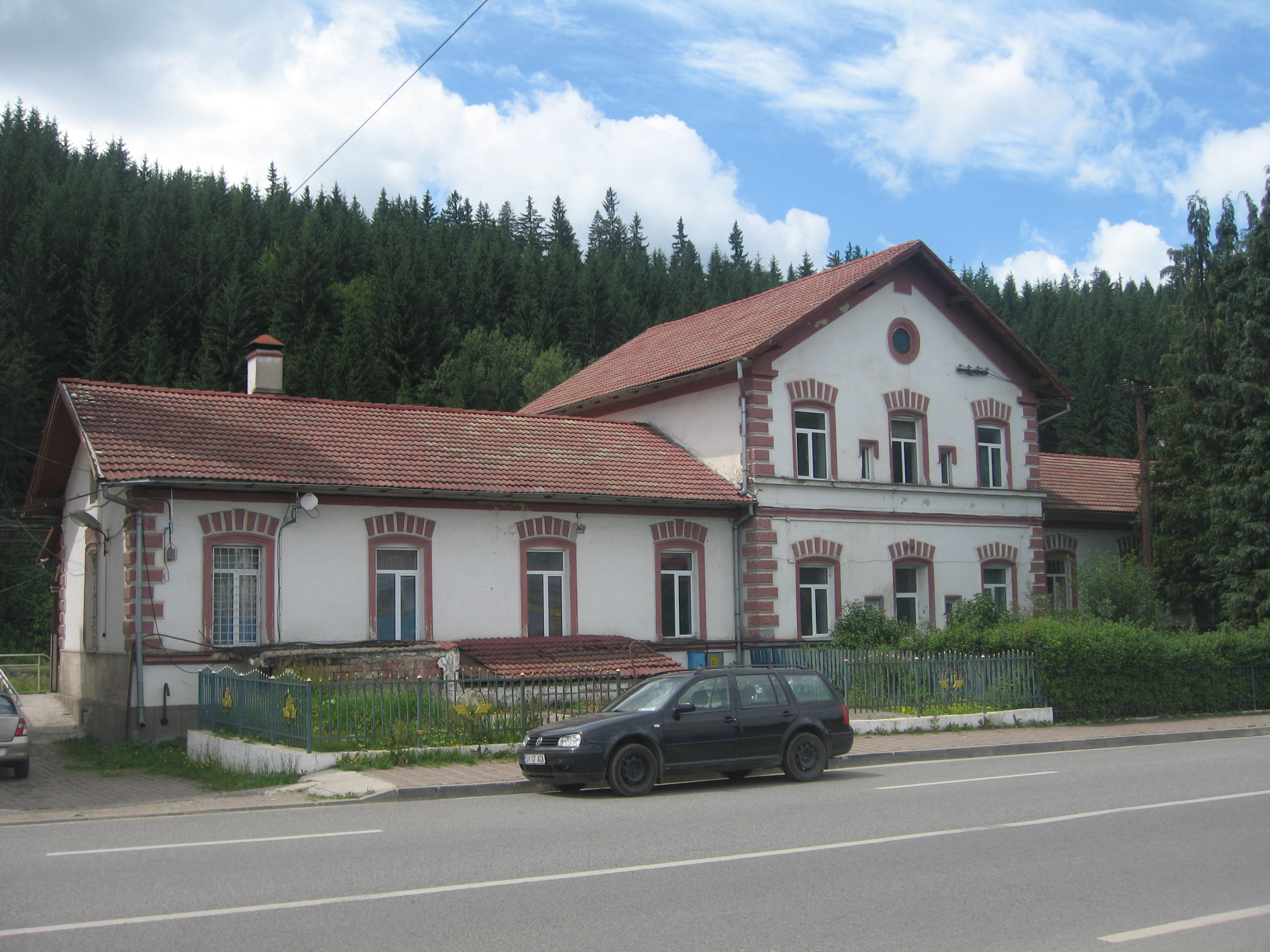
Railway station

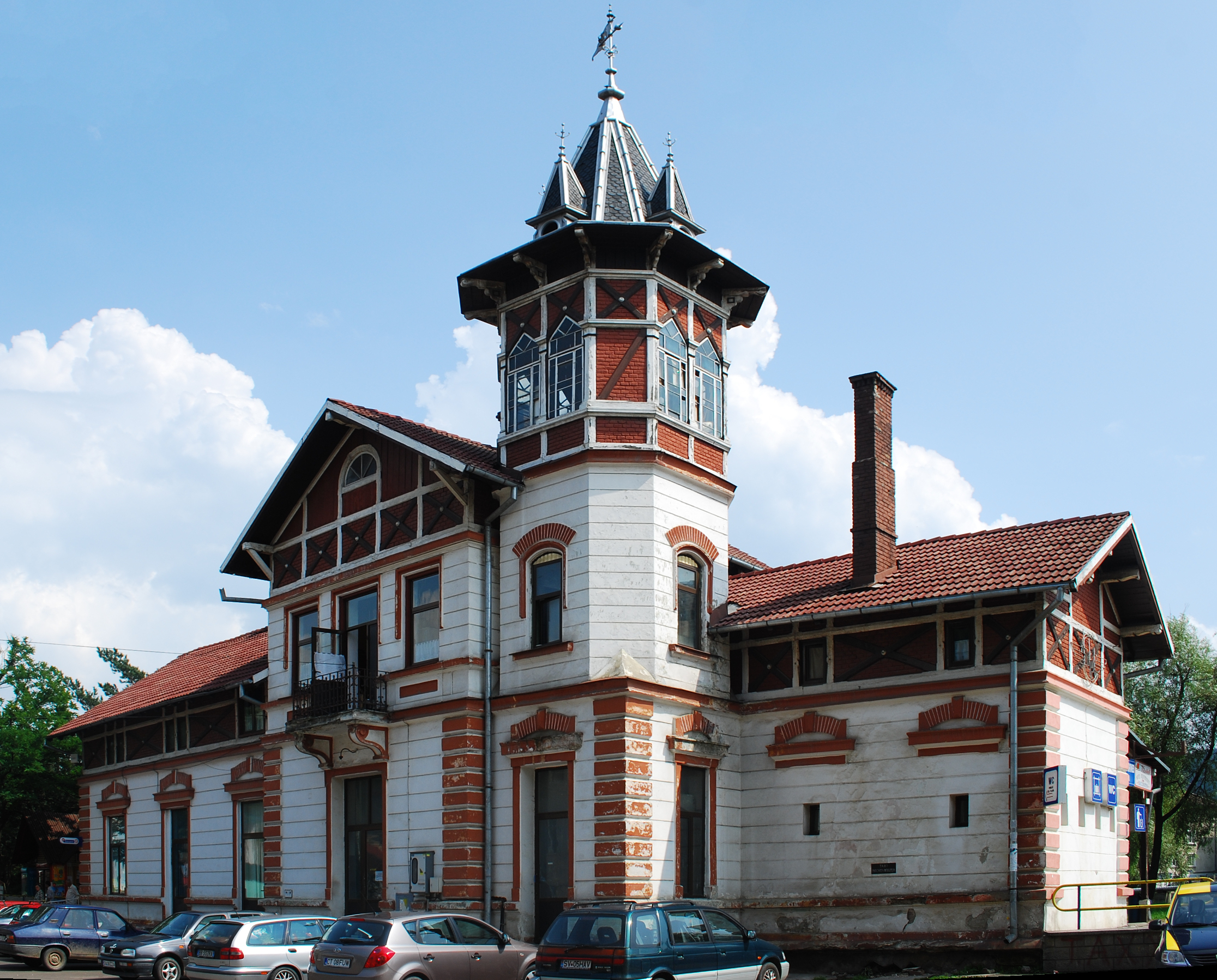
Vatra Dornei Băi railway station

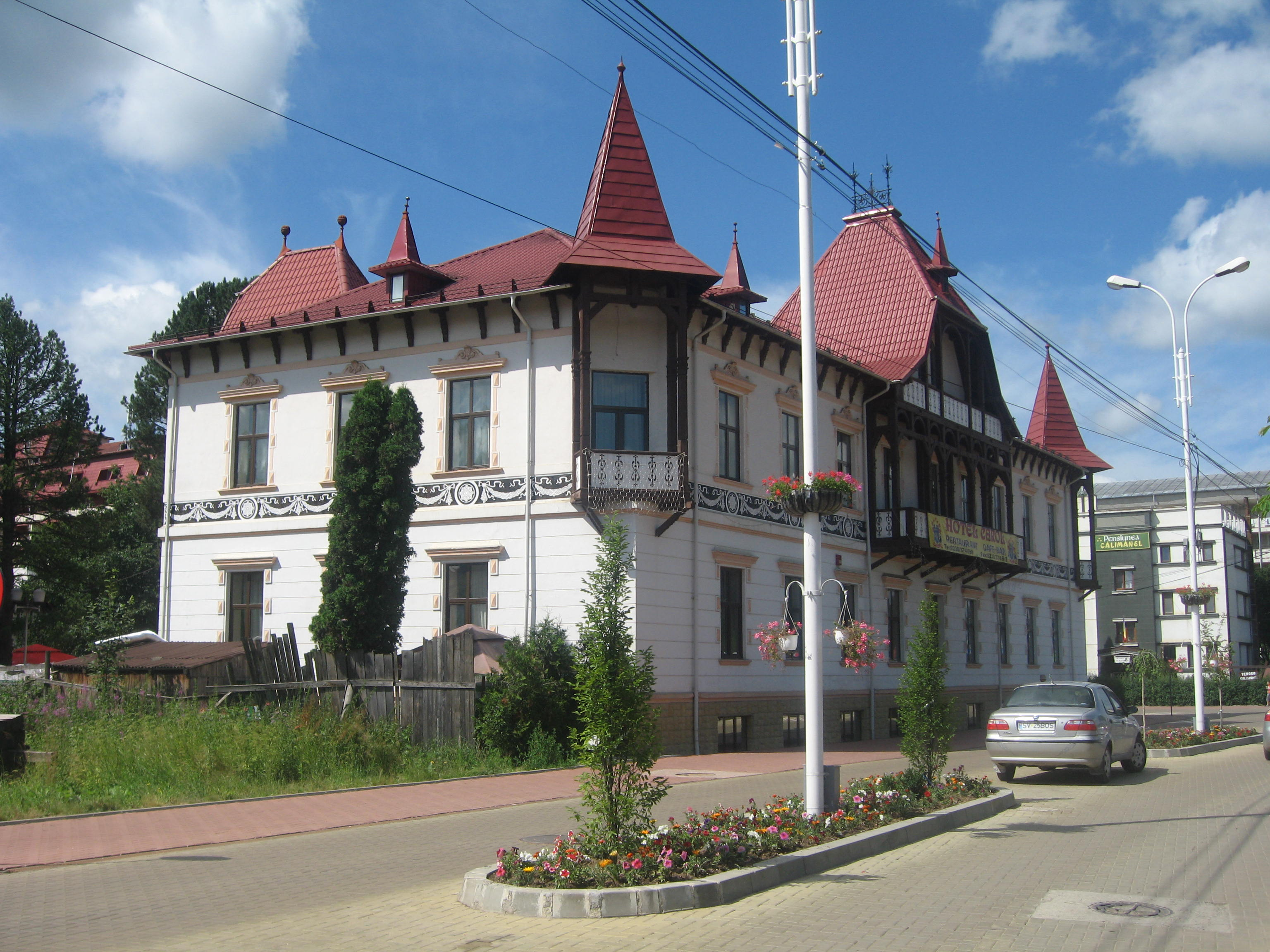
Carol Hotel

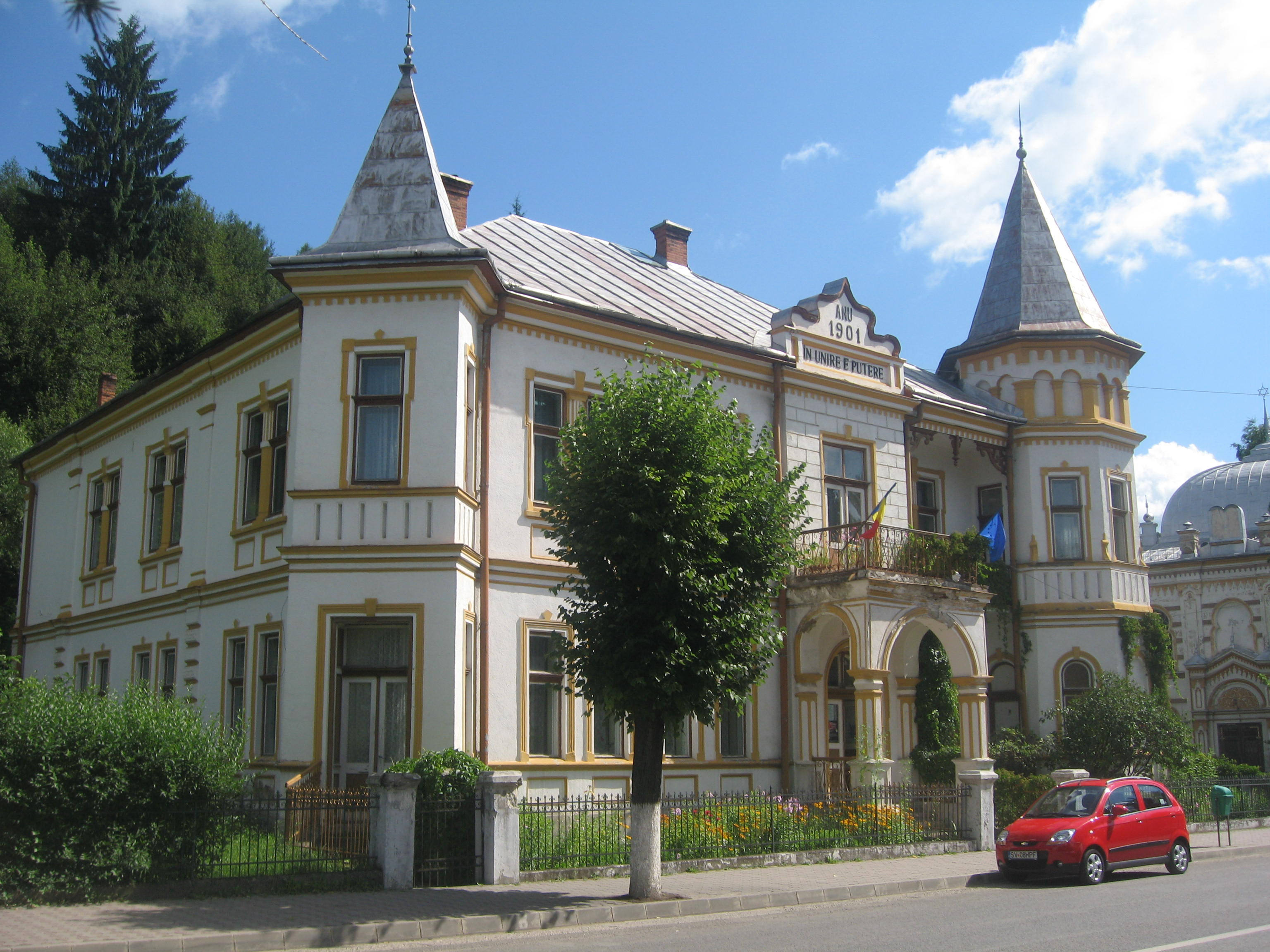
Town library

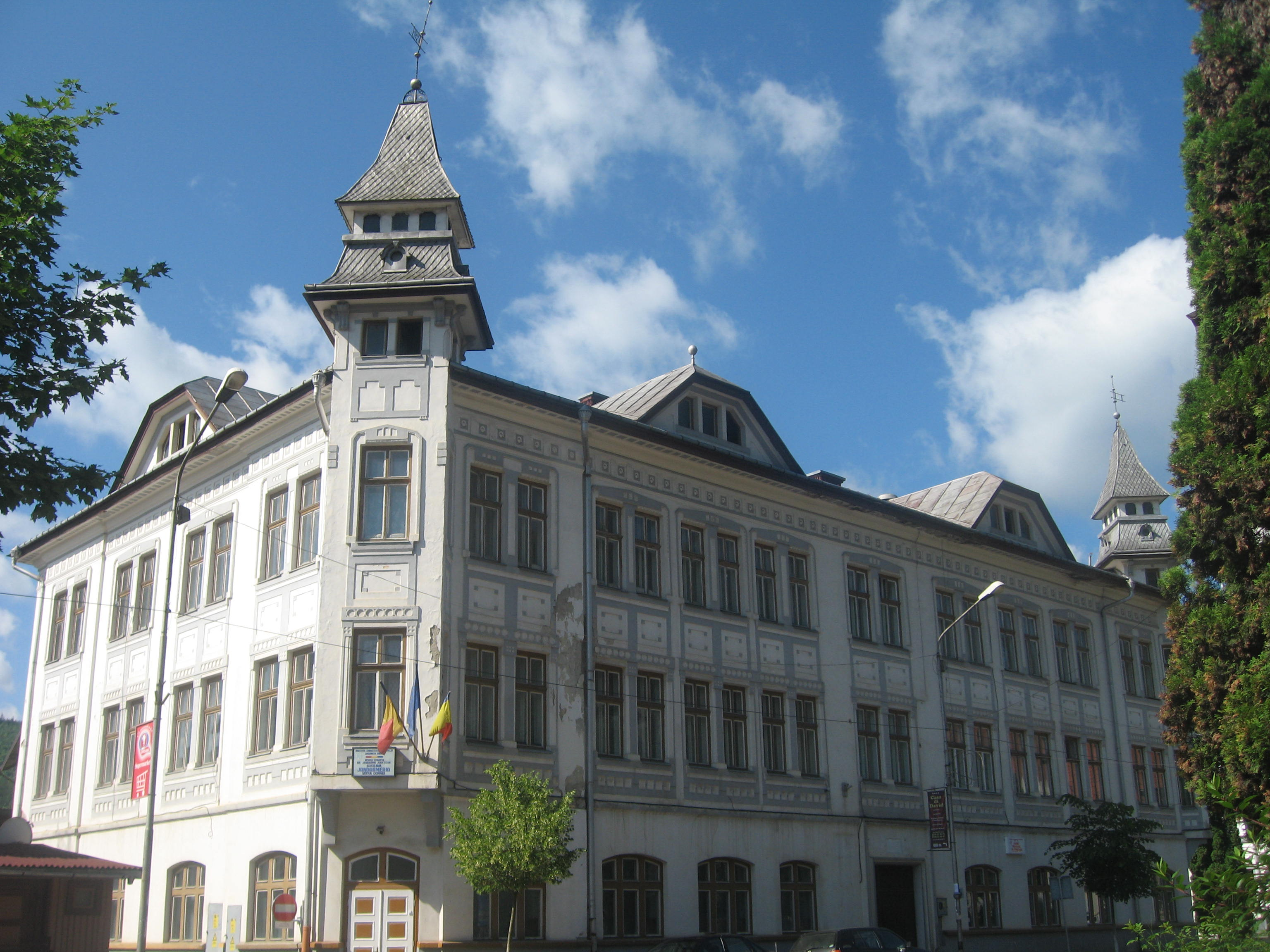
Court

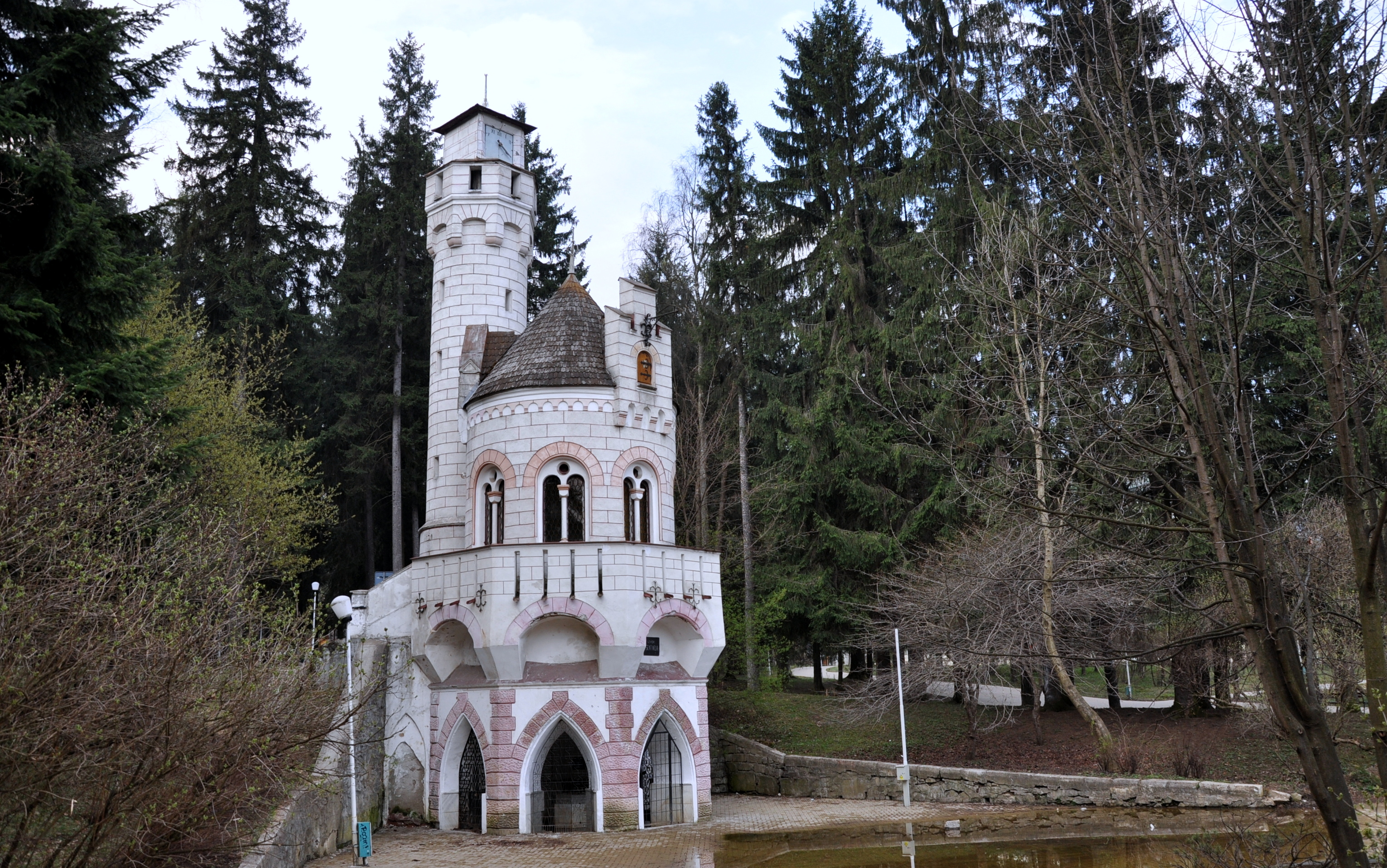
Santinela spring

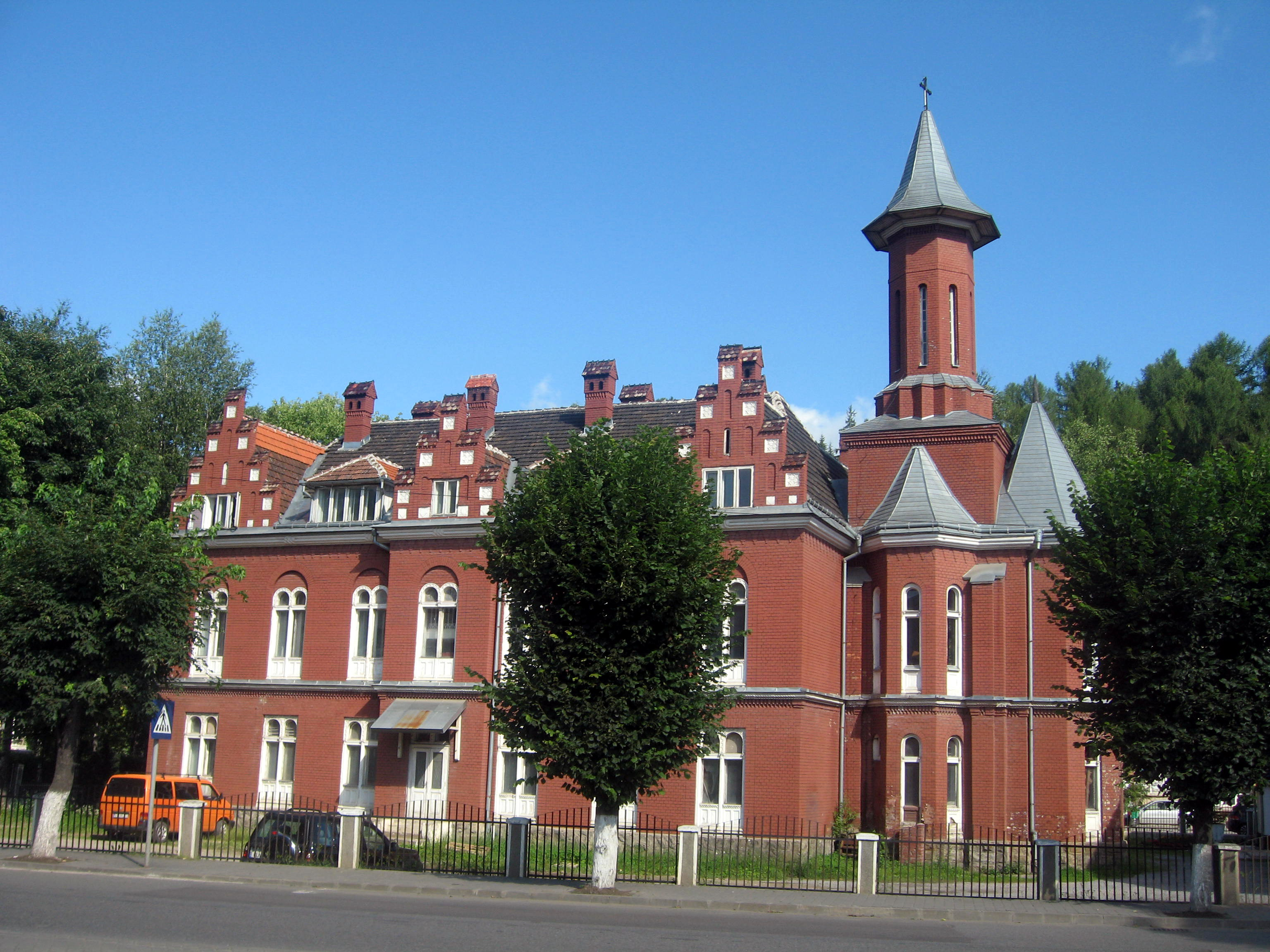
Vladimir House

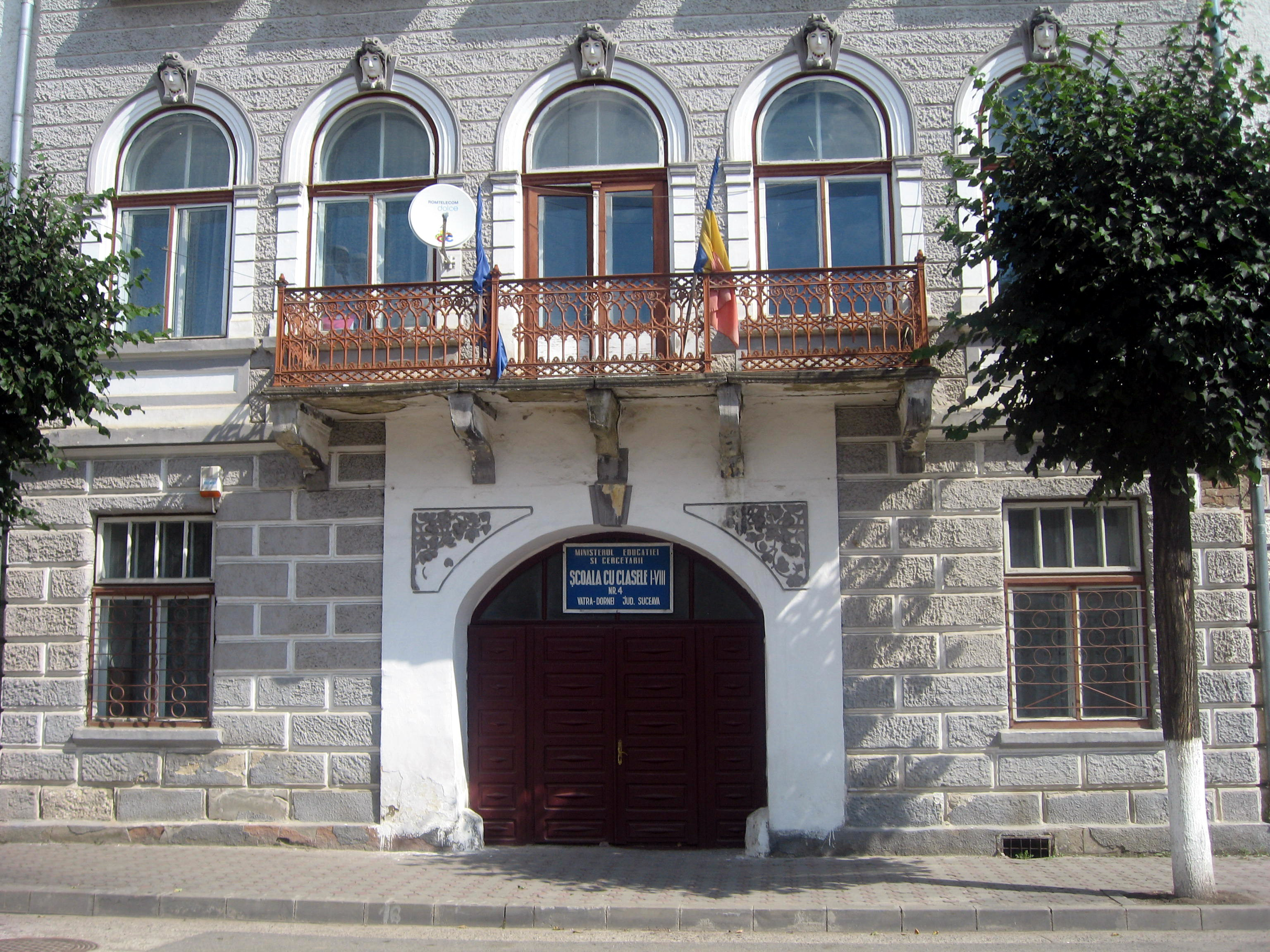
Elementary school nr. 4

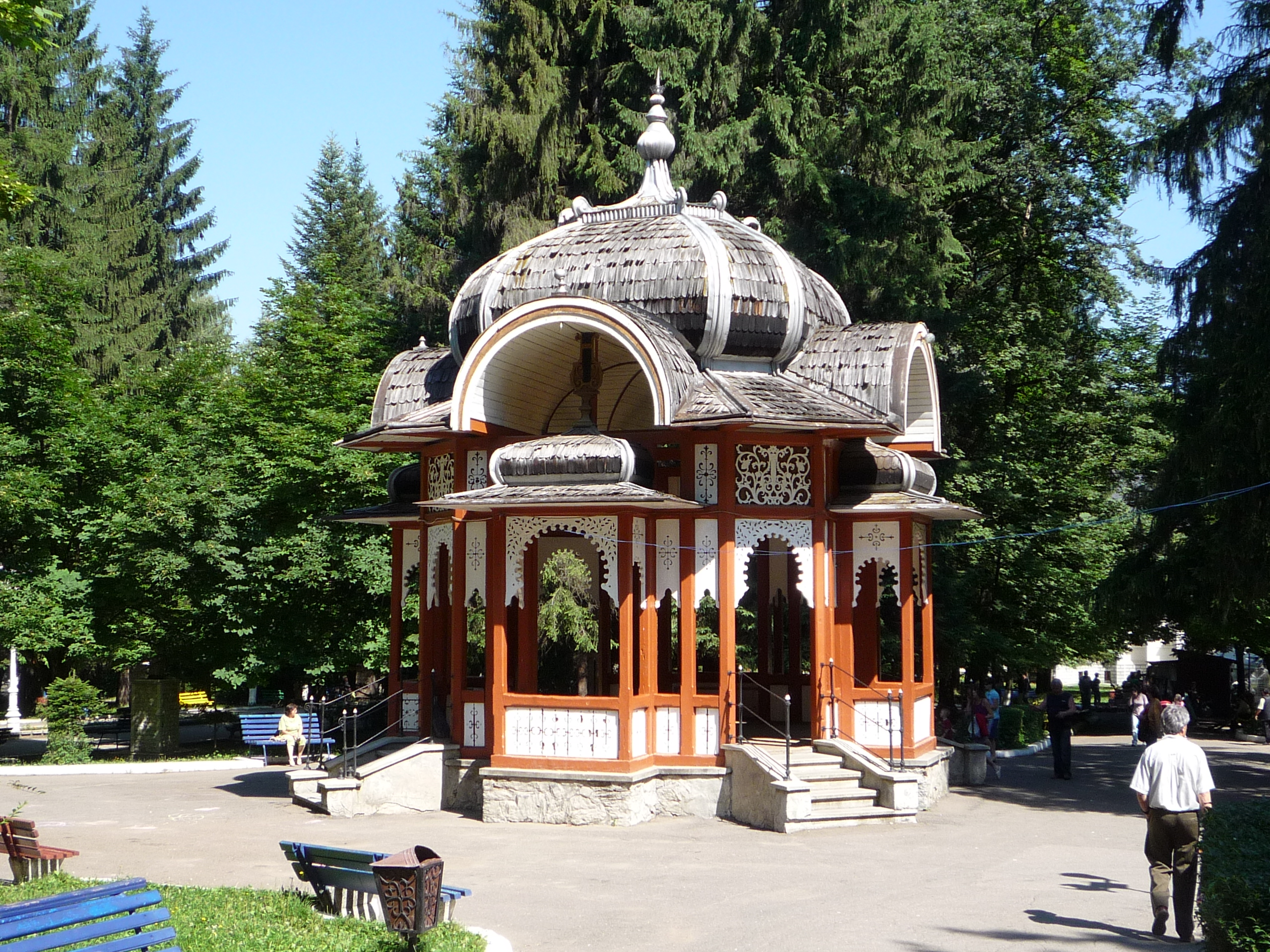
Japanese Pavilion

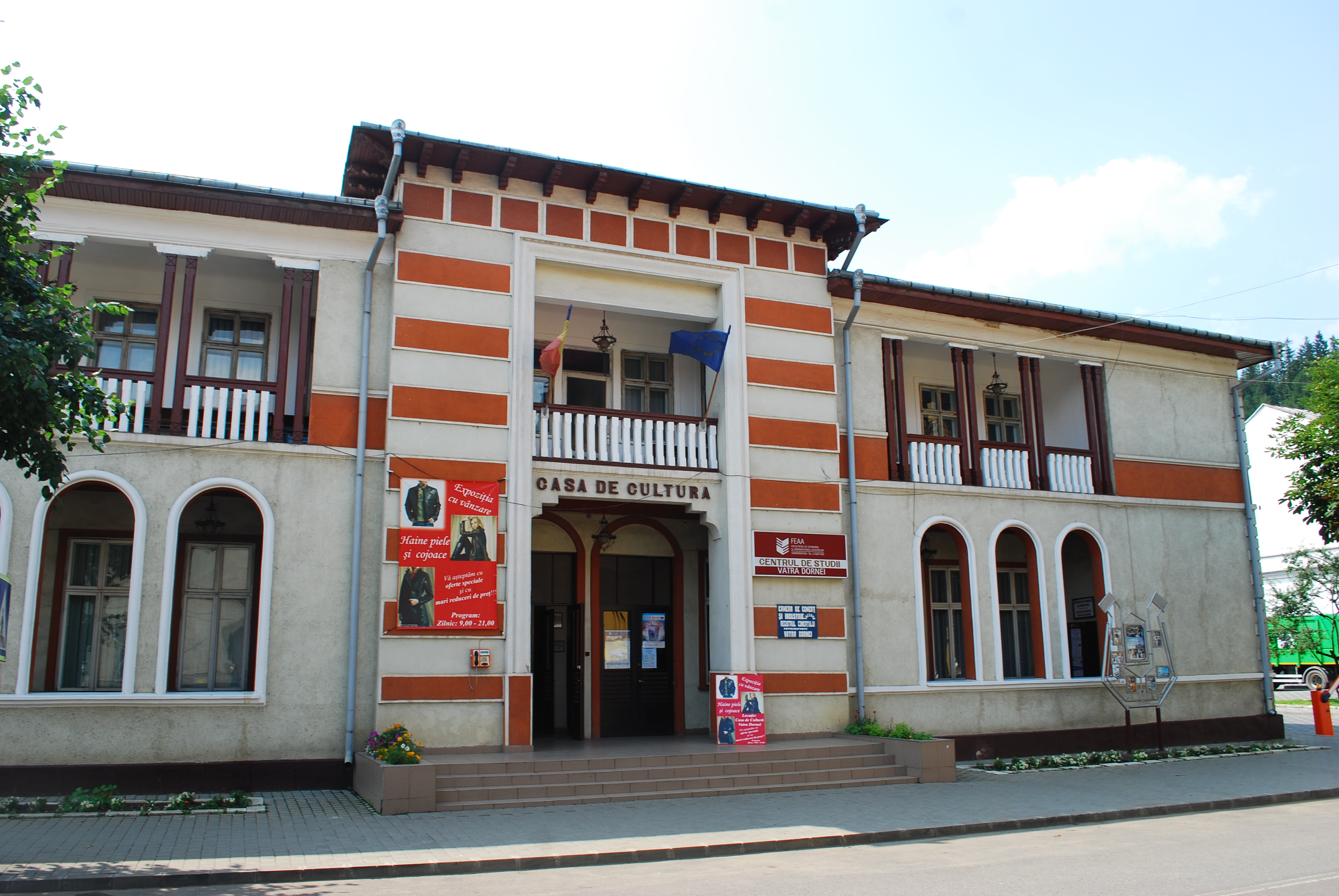
House of Culture

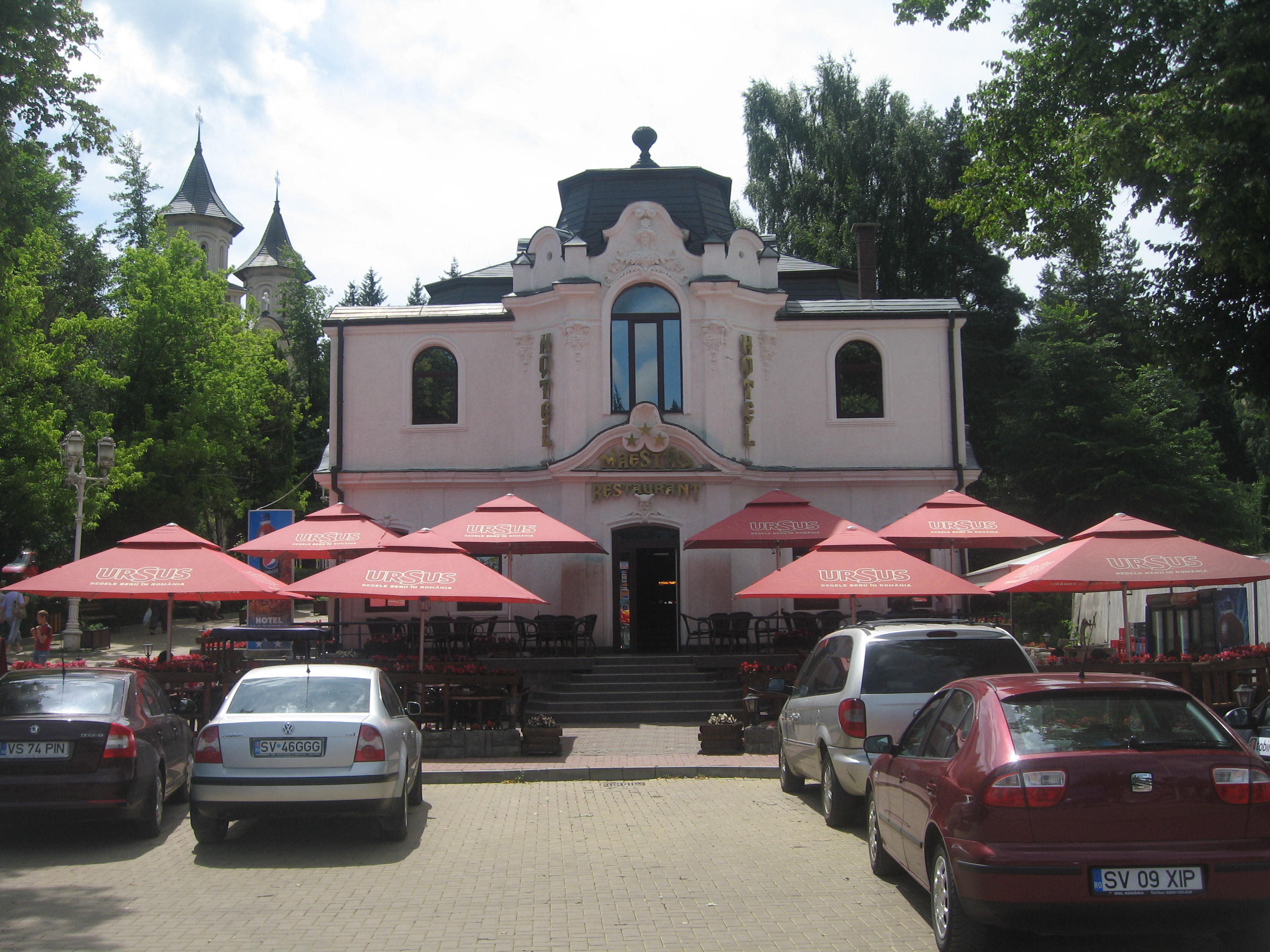
Unirea Spring

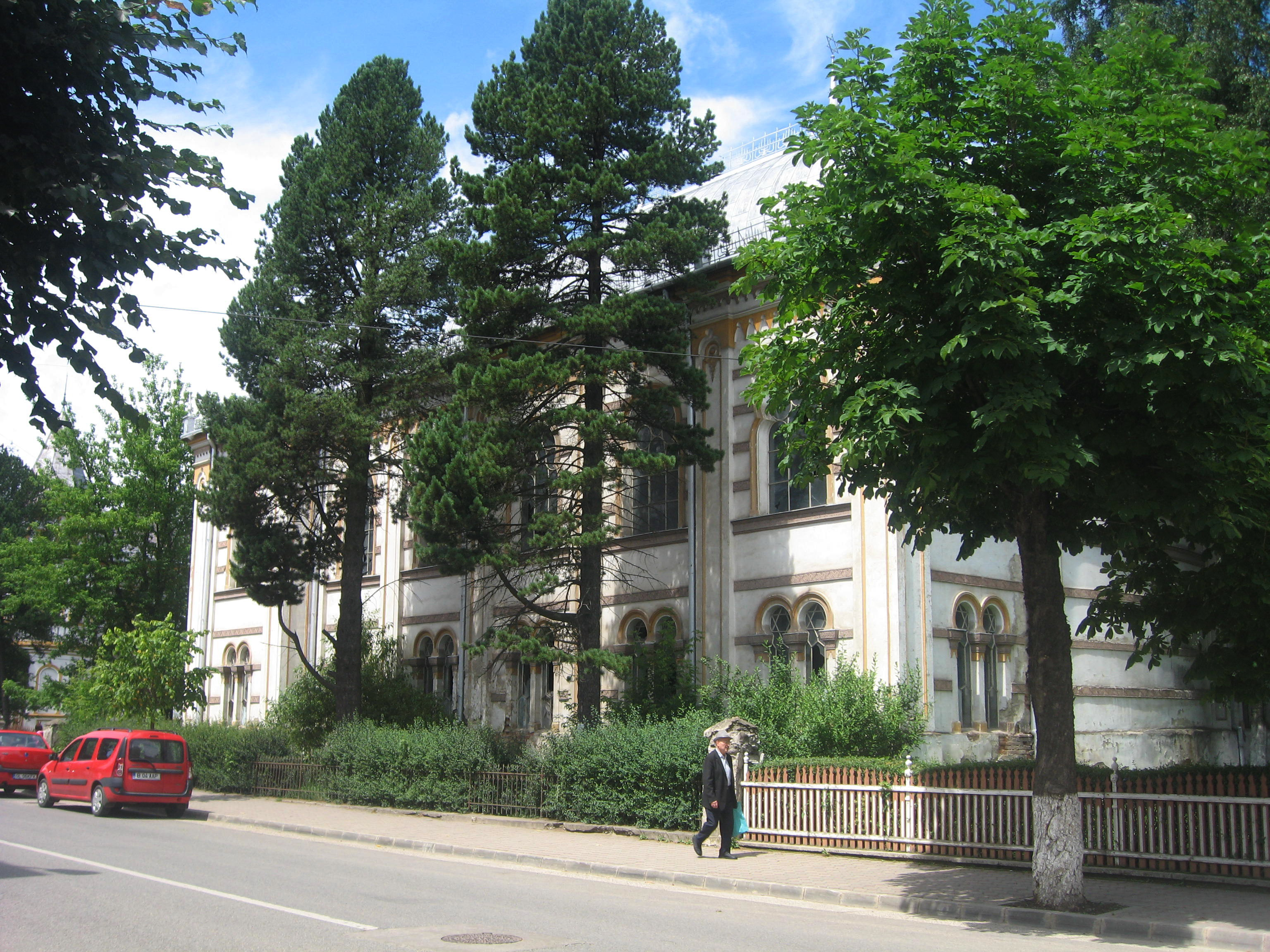
Great Jewish Temple

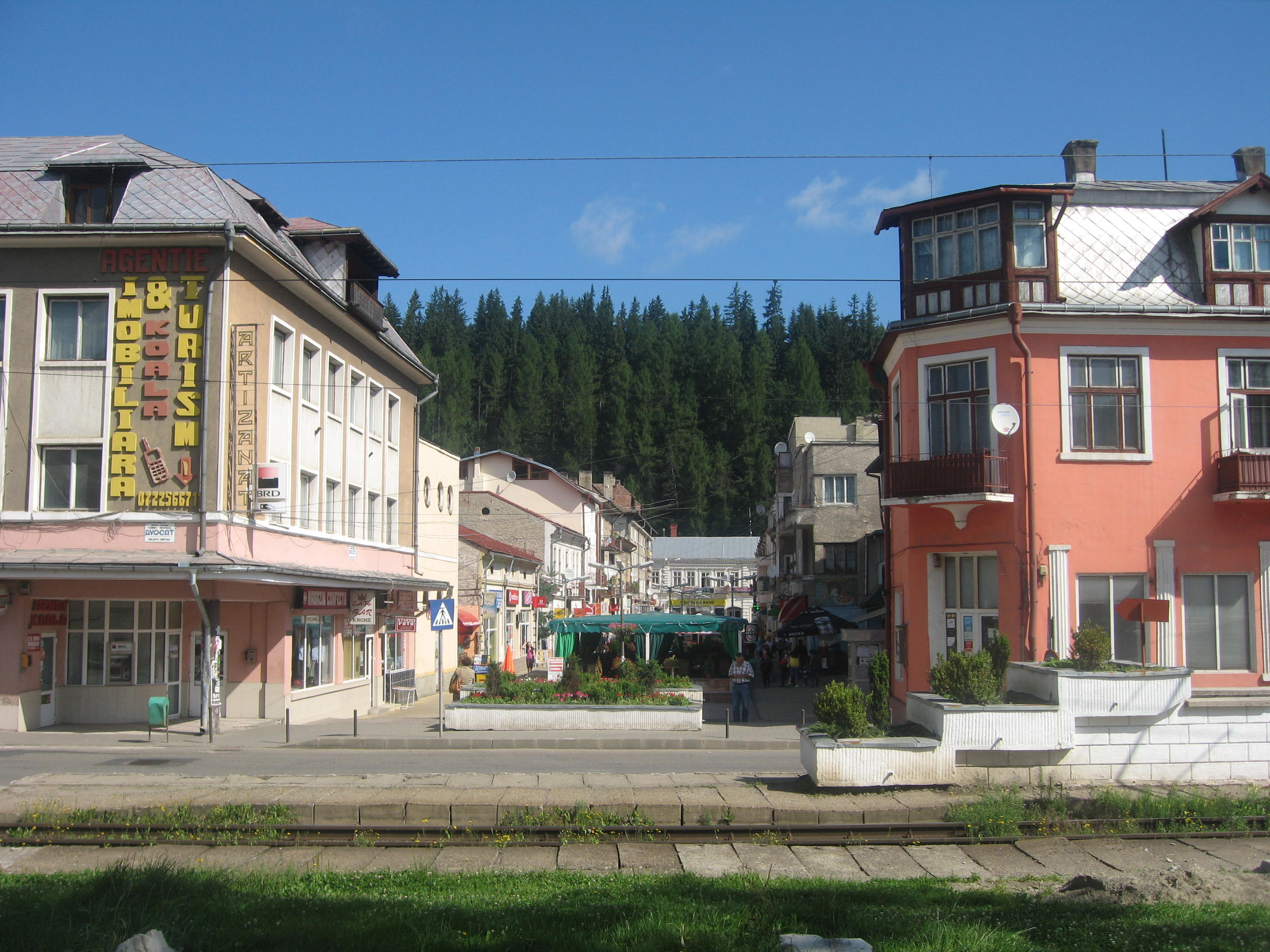
Luceafărul Street

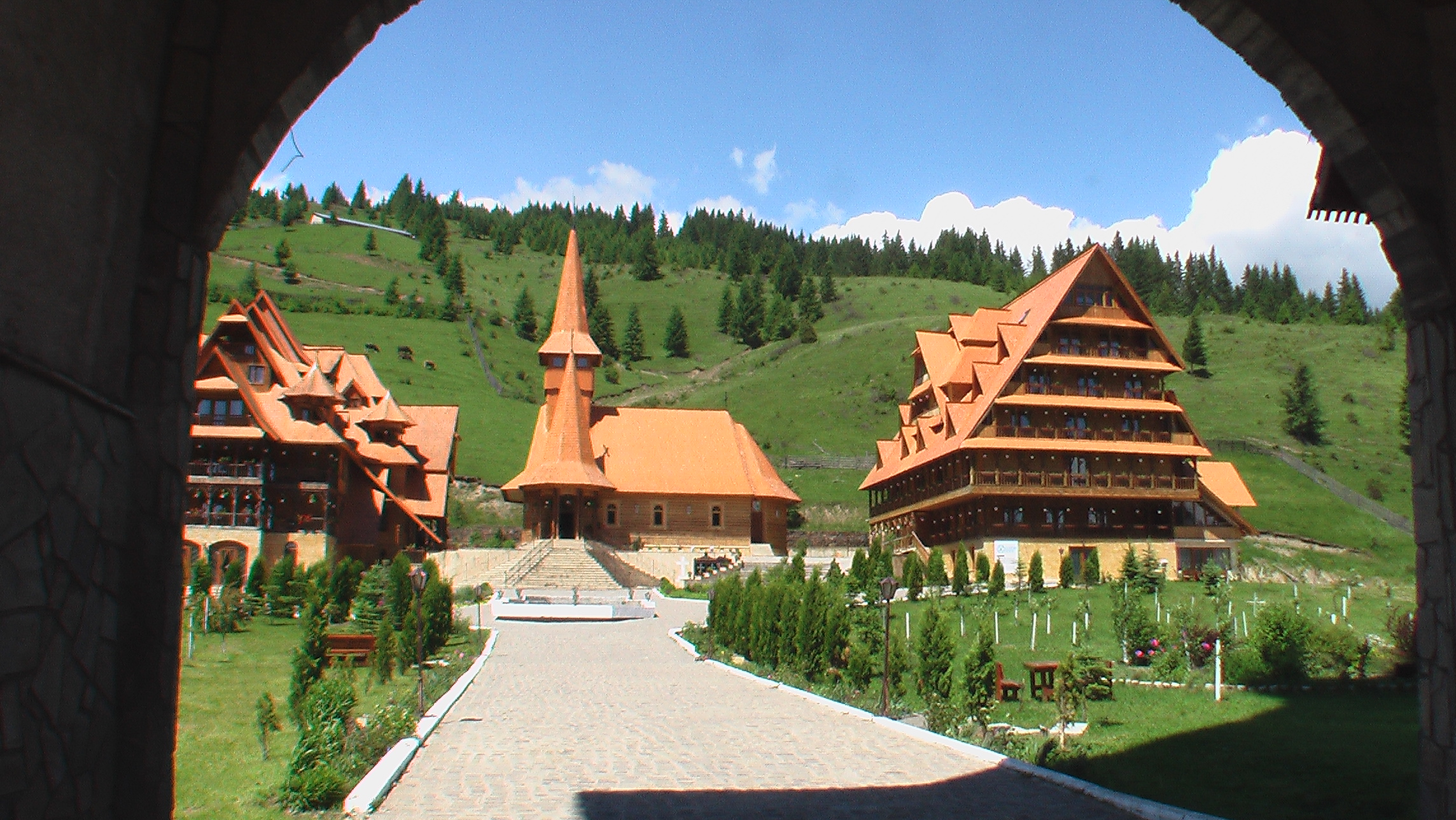
Traditional Romanian Wooden Church

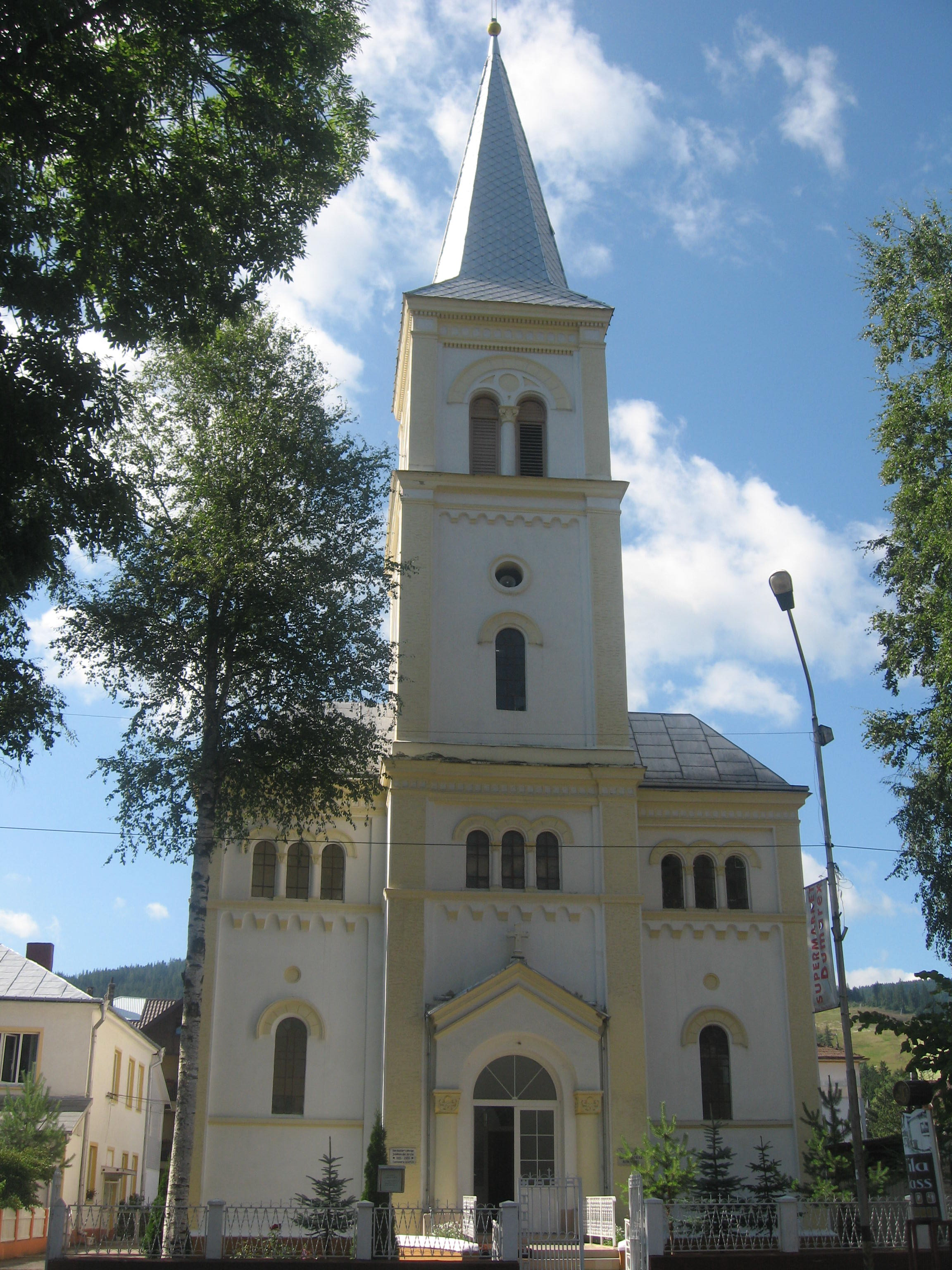
Roman Catholic Church
