= Dorna (river) =

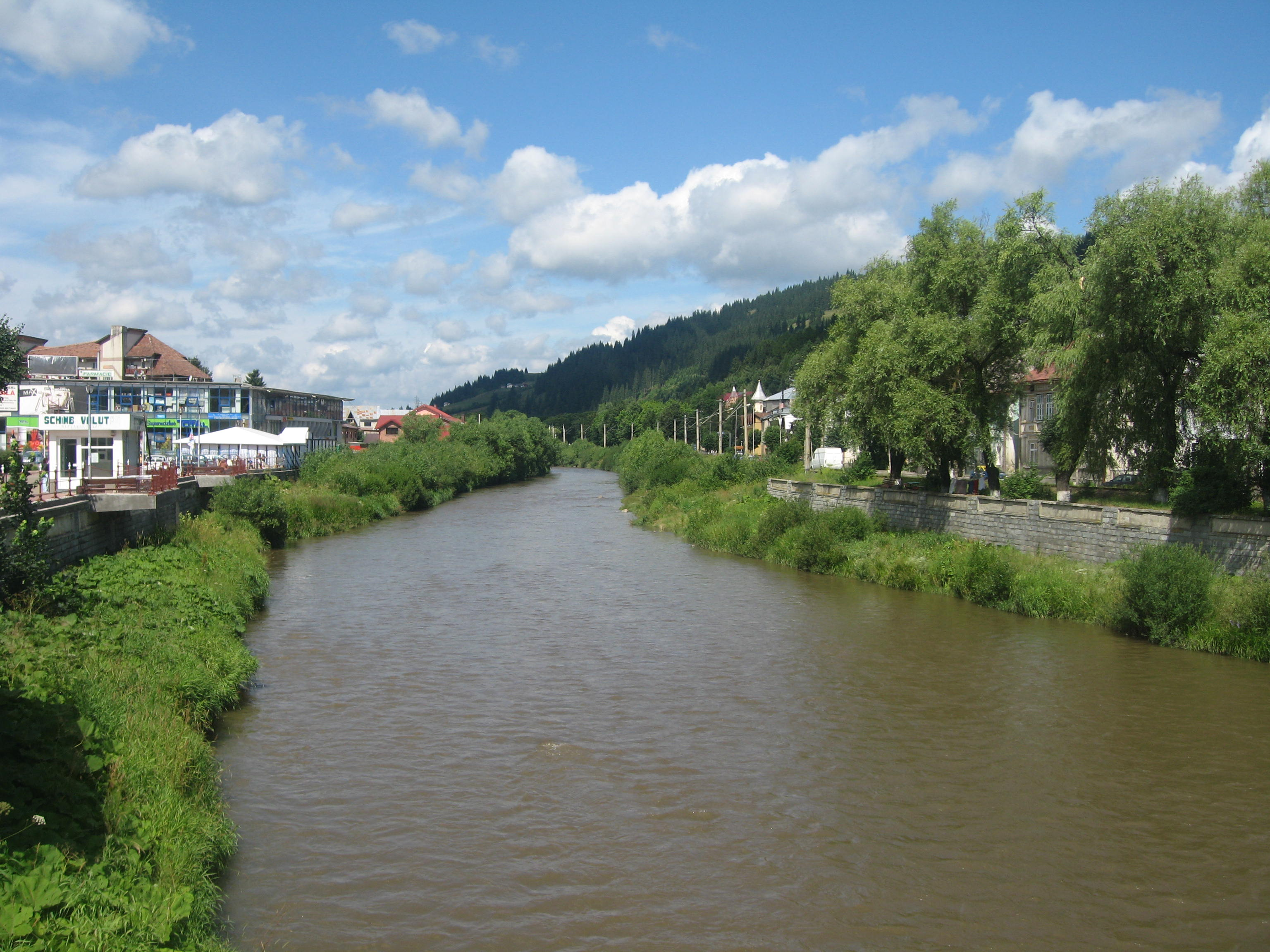

- Location within Romania

Location
- Country: Romania
- Counties: Suceava County

Physical characteristics
- Source: Călimani Mountains
- Mouth: Bistrița
  - location: Vatra Dornei
  - coordinates: 47.3452°N 25.3713°E
- Length: 53 km (33 mi)
- Basin size: 608 km^{2} (235 sq mi)

Basin features
- Progression: Bistrița→ Siret→ Danube→ Black Sea

The Dorna is a right tributary of the river Bistrița in Romania. It discharges into the Bistrița at Vatra Dornei. It flows through the villages Dornișoara, Poiana Stampei, Podu Coșnei, Dorna Candrenilor, and the town Vatra Dornei. Its length is 53 kilometres (33 mi), and its basin size is 608 square kilometres (235 sq mi).

== Tributaries ==
The following rivers are tributaries to the river Dorna (from source to mouth):

- Left: Tihul, Dornișoara, Teșnița, Teșna, Izvorul Alb, Doceni
- Right: Bârsaniul, Prislop, Roșia, Alexeni, Negrișoara, Secu, Colăcelul, Pârâul Roșu
