= Coșna =

Coșna German: Koszna
- Commune
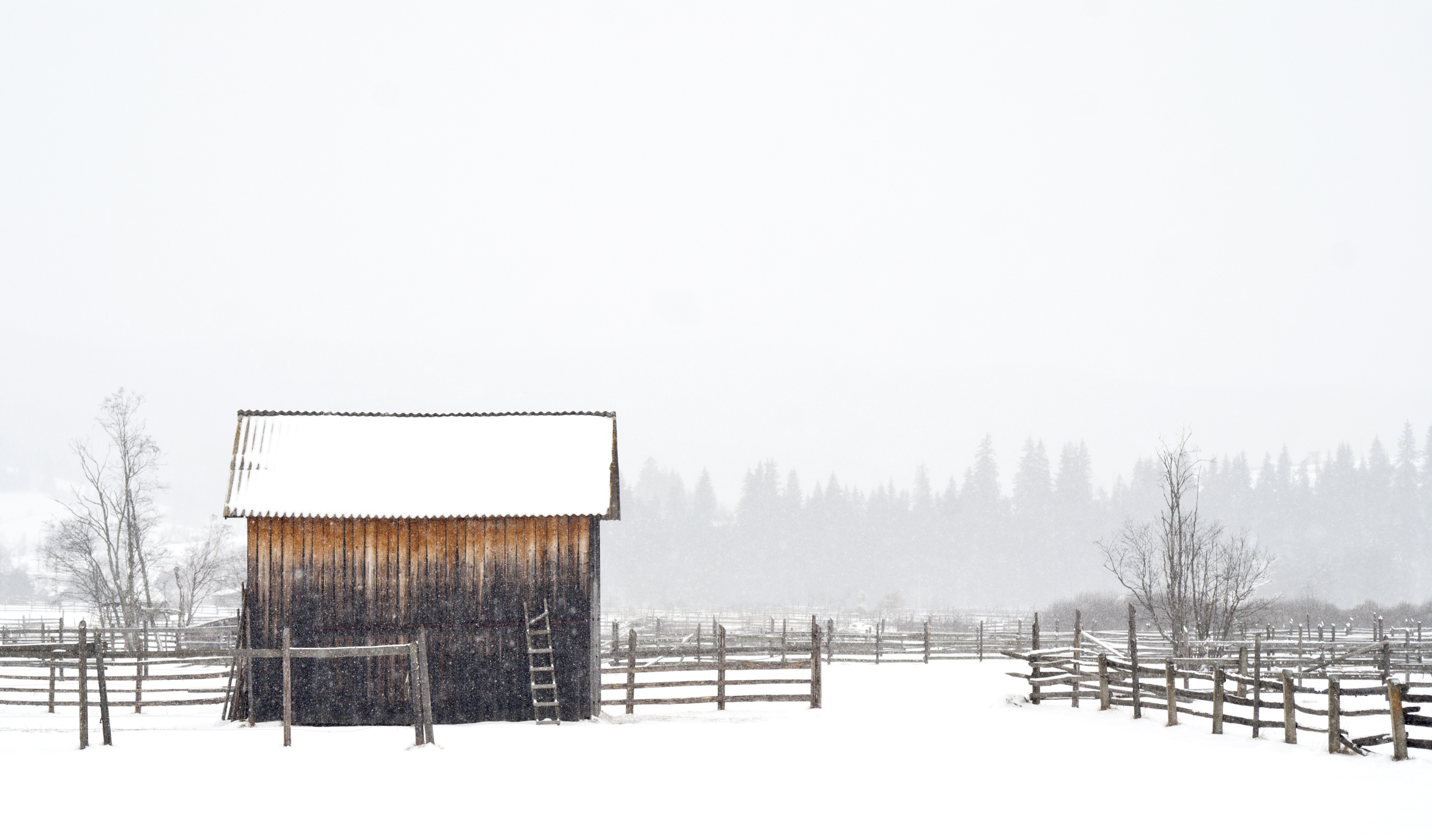
- Rural landscape in Coșna

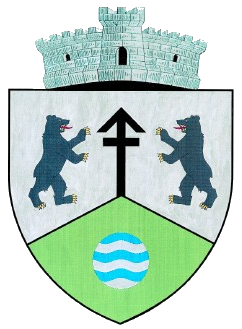
- Coat of arms

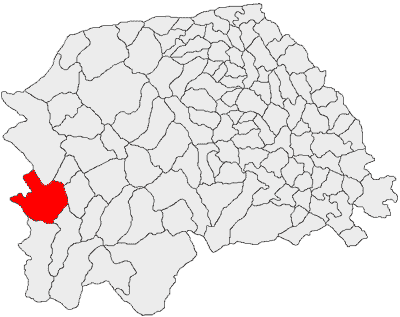
- Location in Suceava County

- Location in Romania
- Coordinates: 47°23′N 25°10′E
- Country: Romania
- County: Suceava
- Subdivisions: Coșna, Podu Coșnei, Românești, Teșna, Valea Bancului

Government
  - Mayor (2024–2028): Gavril Pardău (PSD)
- Area: 208.78 km^{2} (80.61 sq mi)
- Elevation: 840 m (2,760 ft)
- Population (2021-12-01): 1,366
  - Density: 6.543/km^{2} (16.95/sq mi)
- Time zone: UTC+02:00 (EET)
  - Summer (DST): UTC+03:00 (EEST)
- Postal code: 727191
- Area code: +40 x30
- Vehicle reg.: SV
- Website: www.comunacosna.ro

Coșna (German: Koszna or Koschna) is a commune located in Suceava County, in the historical region of Bukovina, northeastern Romania. It is composed of five villages, namely: Coșna, Podu Coșnei, Românești, Teșna, and Valea Bancului. These were part of Dorna Candrenilor commune until 2003, when they were split off.

== Gallery ==
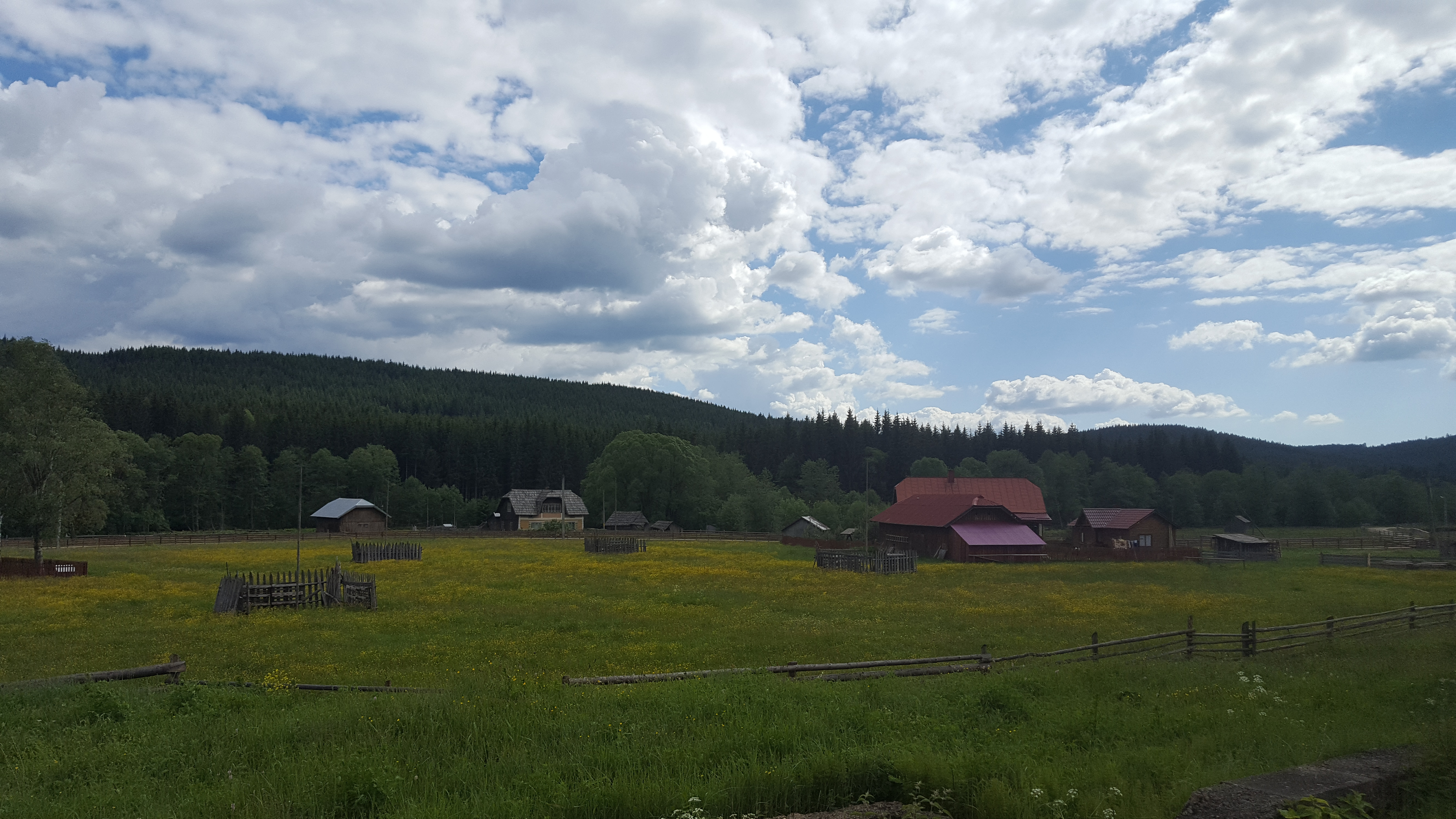
Residential houses in Coșna

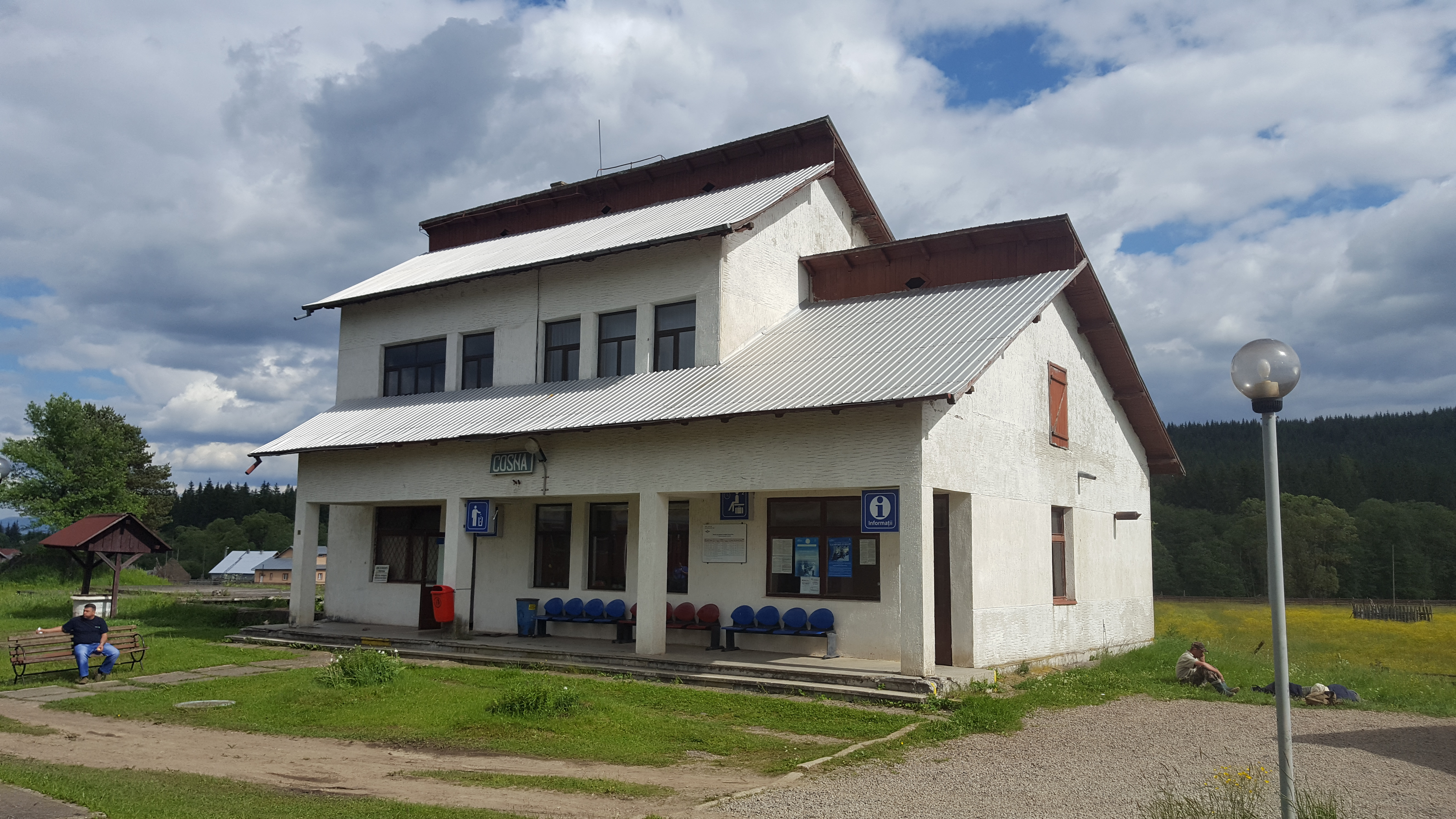
The CFR train station in Coșna
