= Suceava County =

County of Romania

Suceava County Județul Suceava
- County
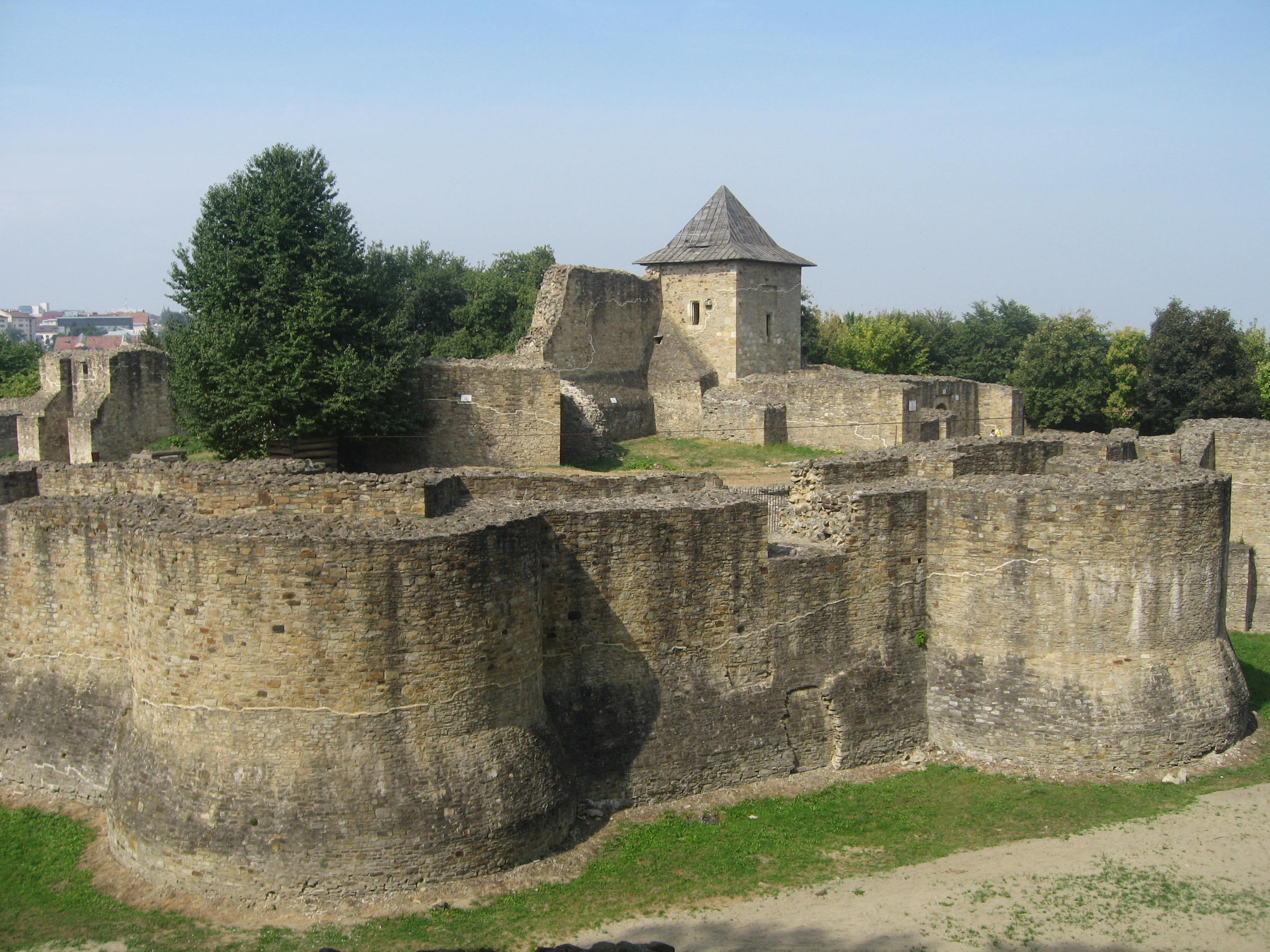
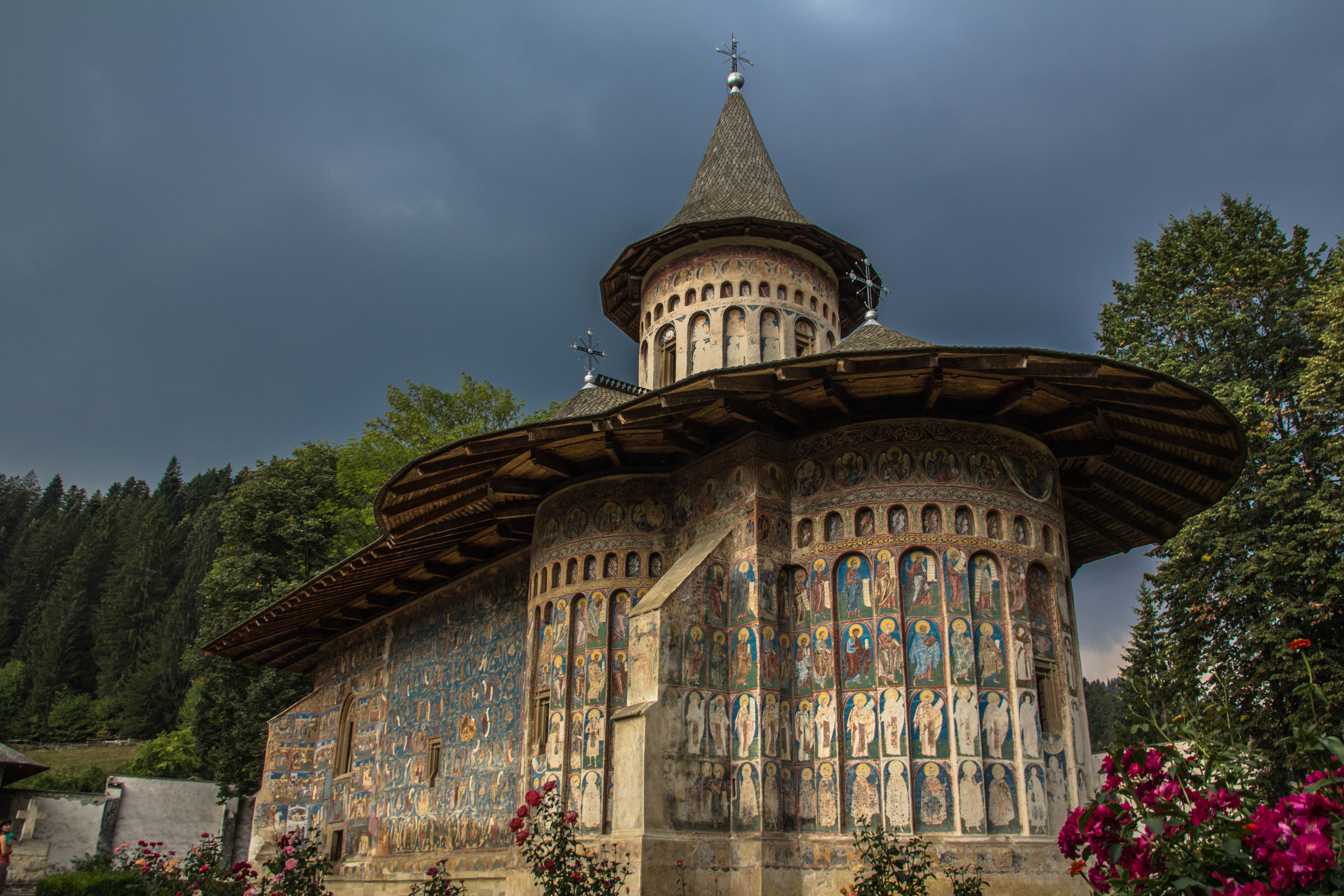
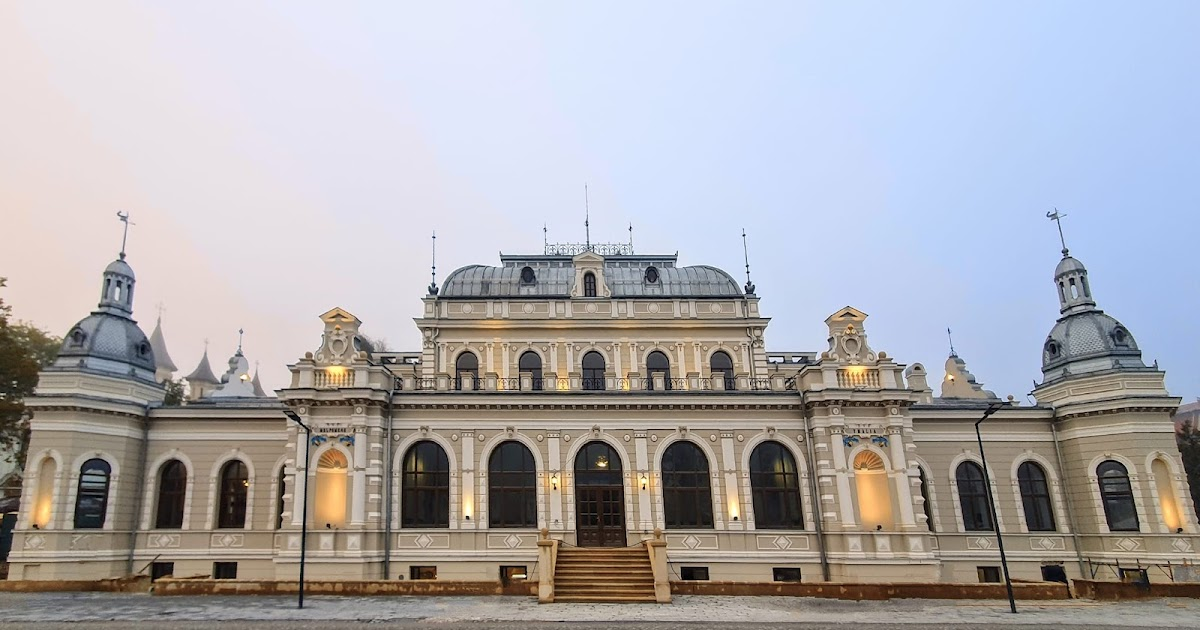
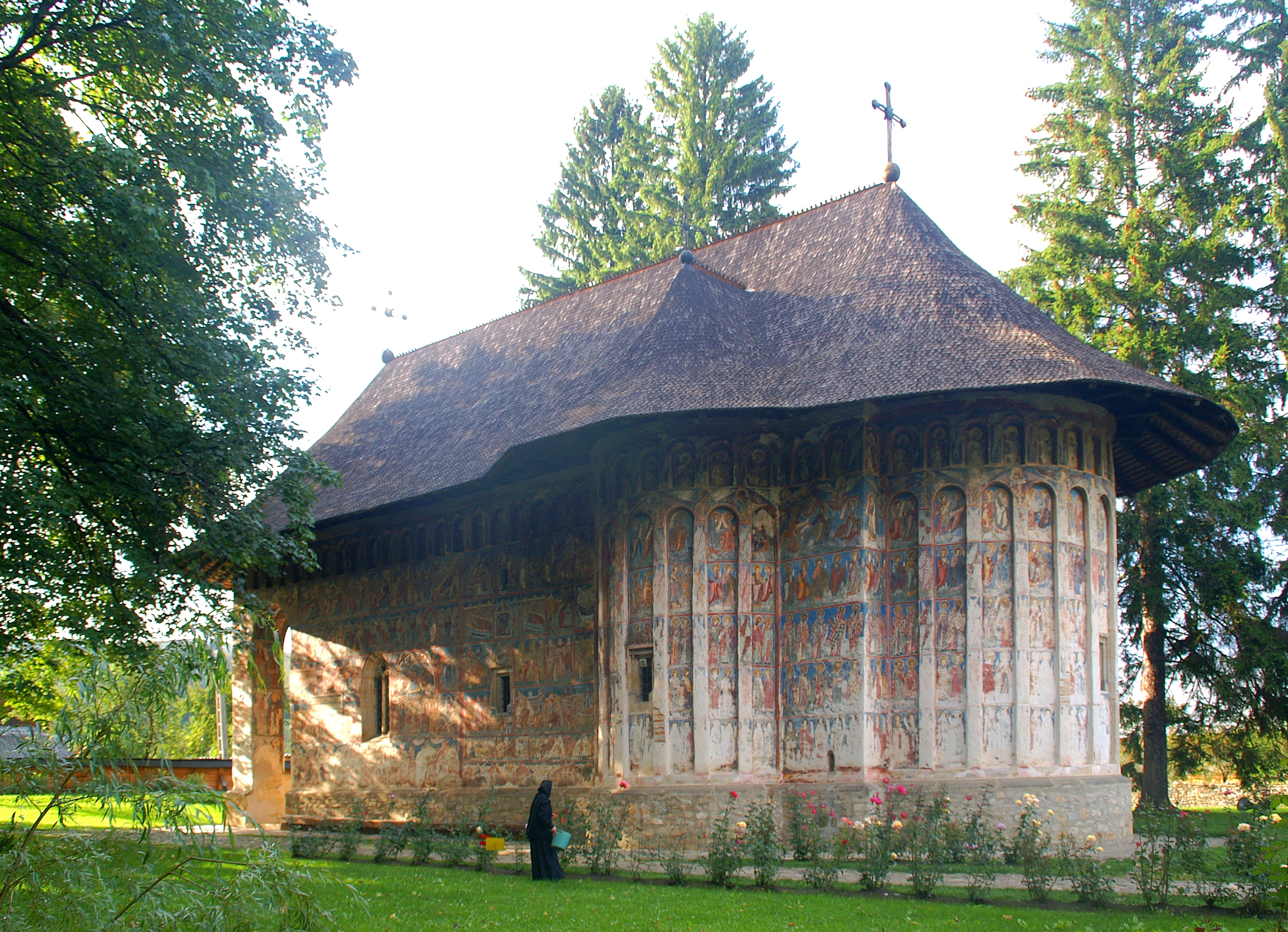
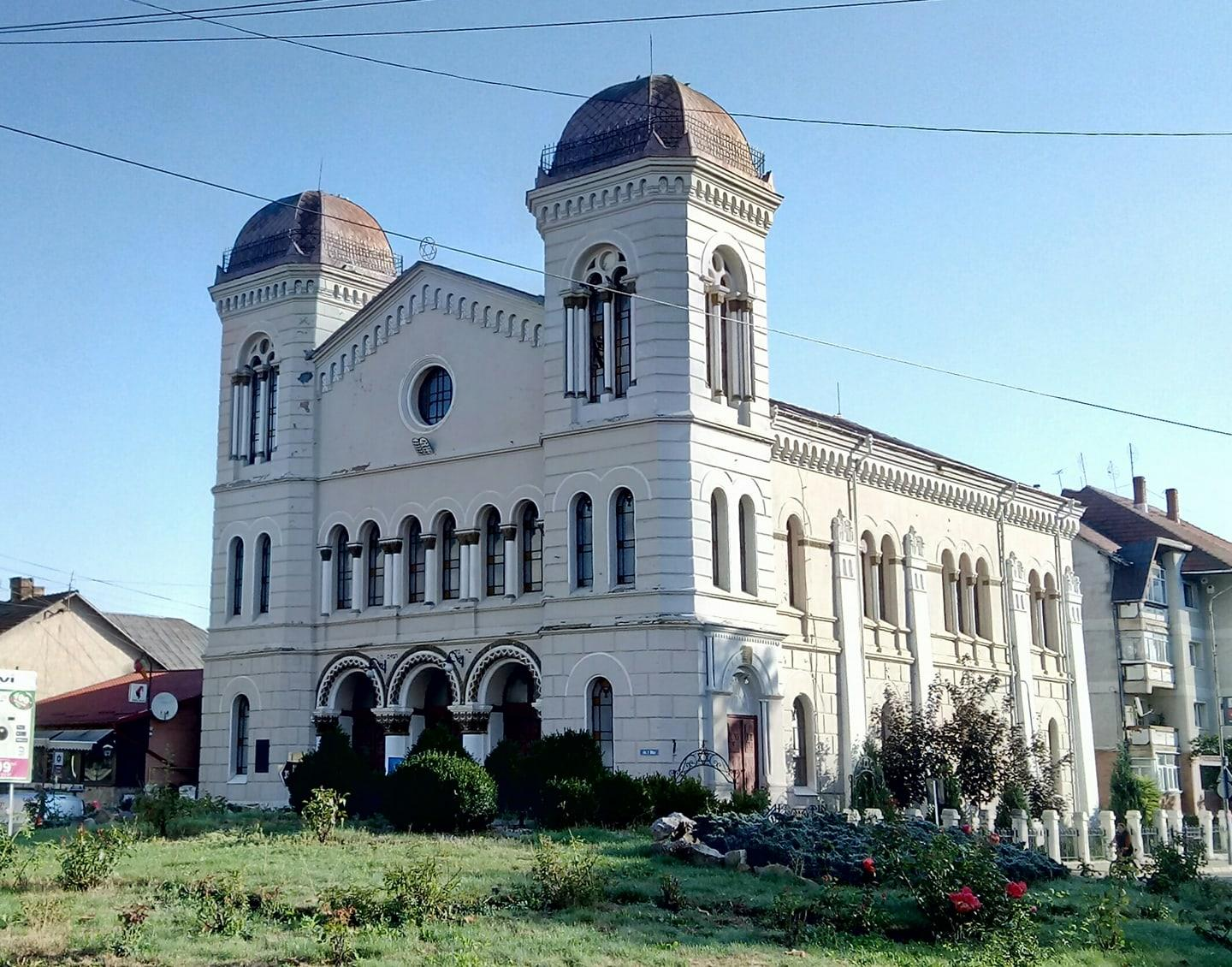
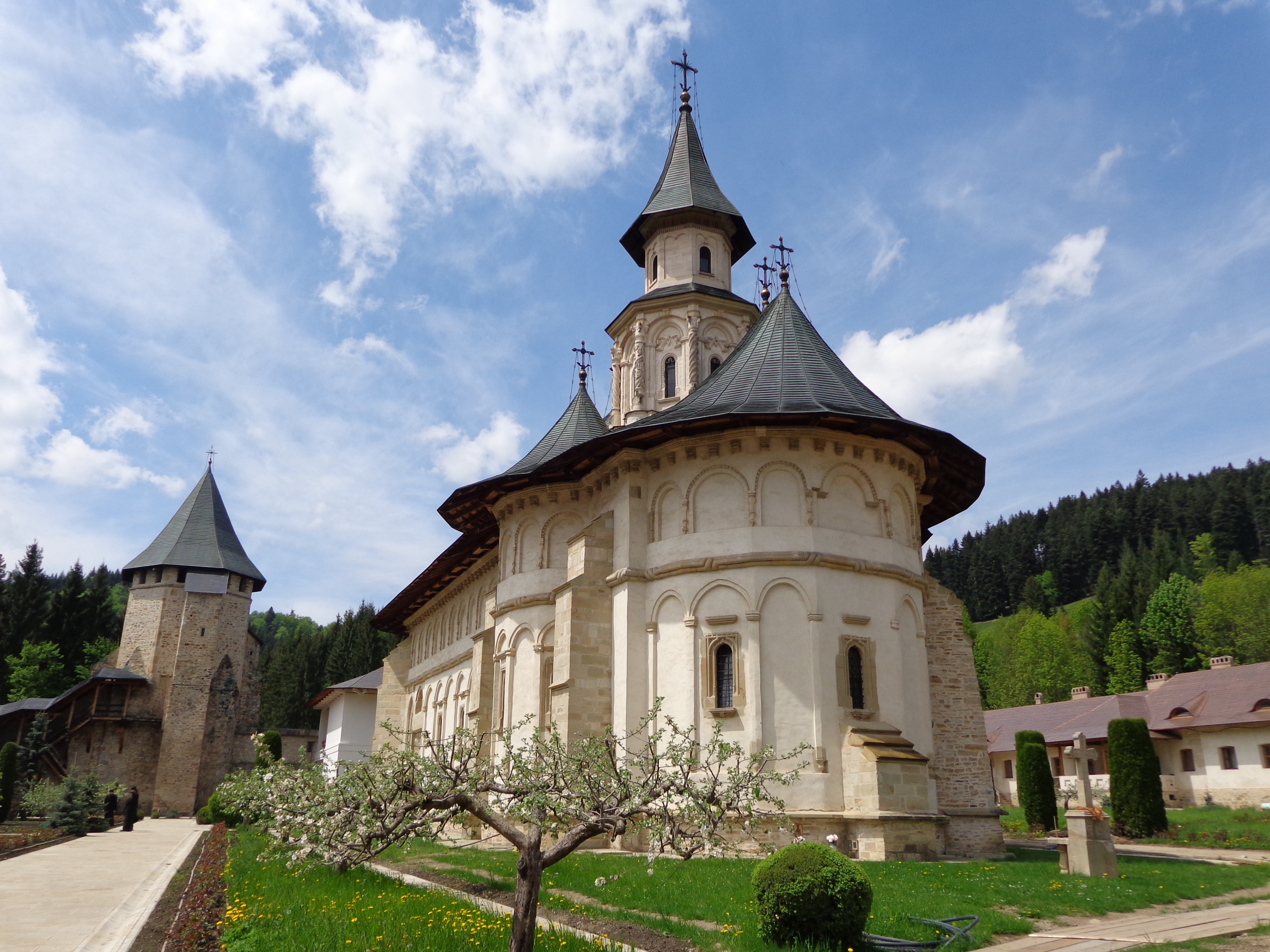
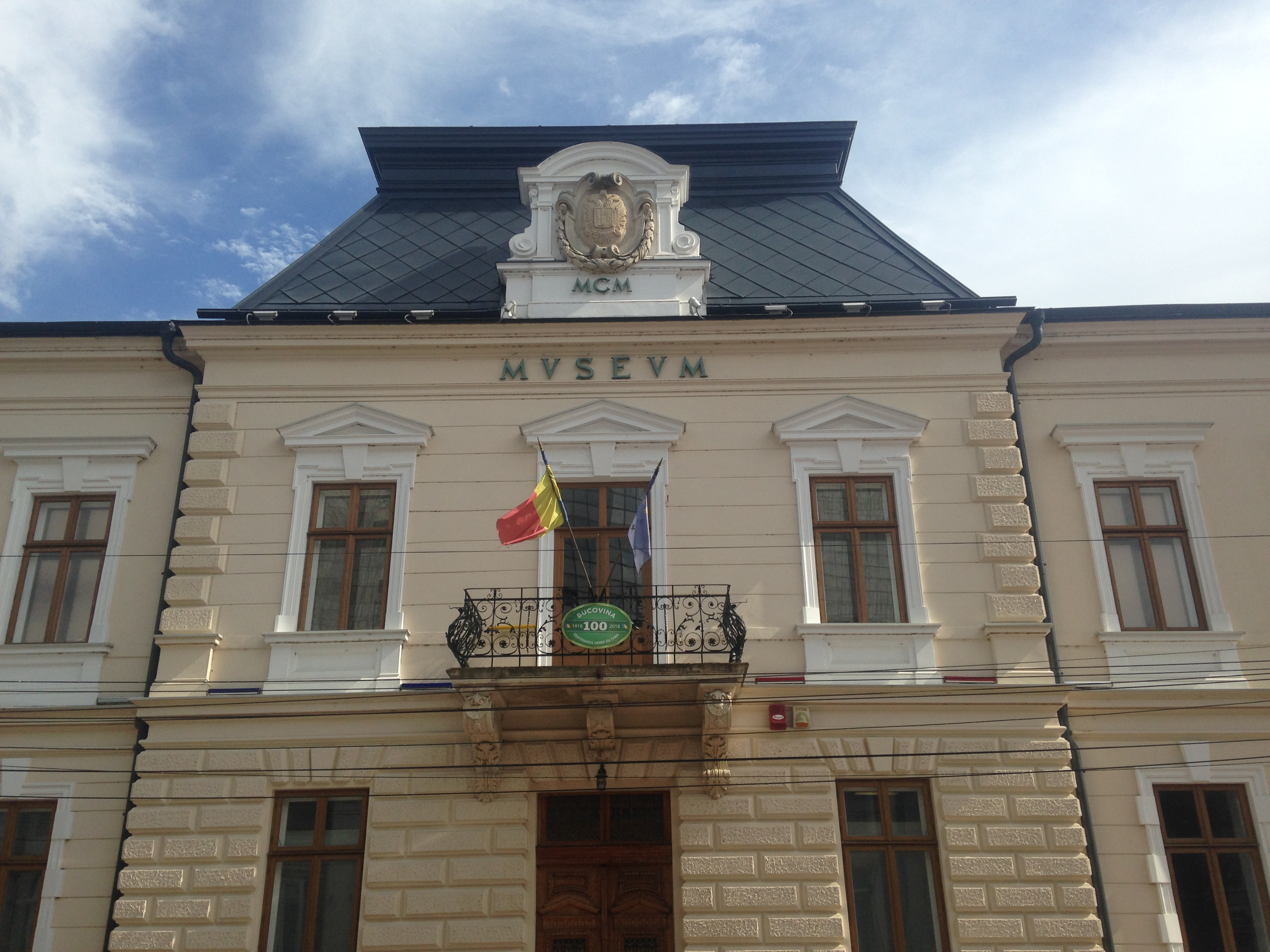
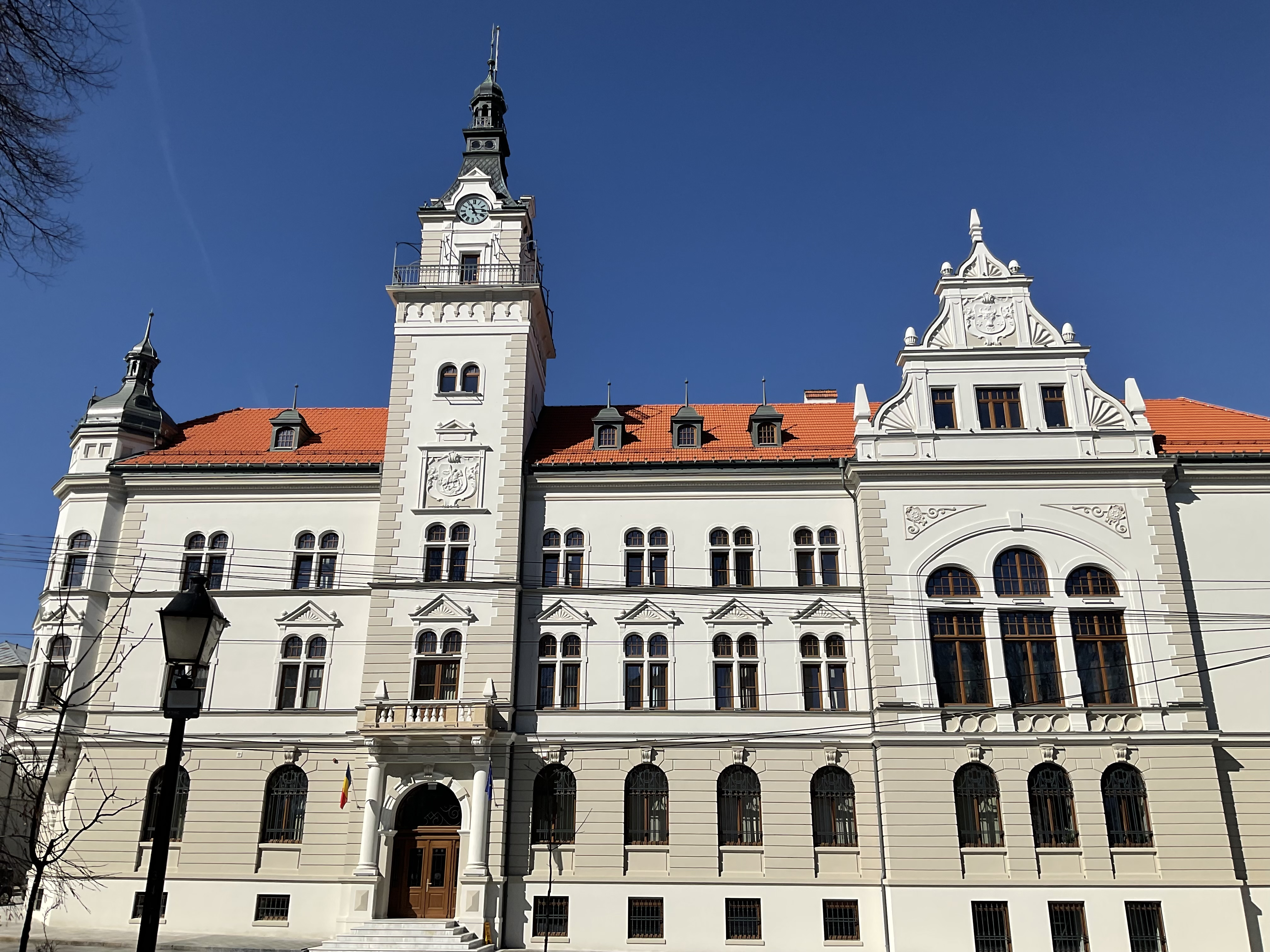
- Suceava Fortress Voroneț Monastery Vatra Dornei Casino Humor Monastery Rădăuți Jewish Temple Putna Monastery Bukovina Museum Suceava Administrative Palace

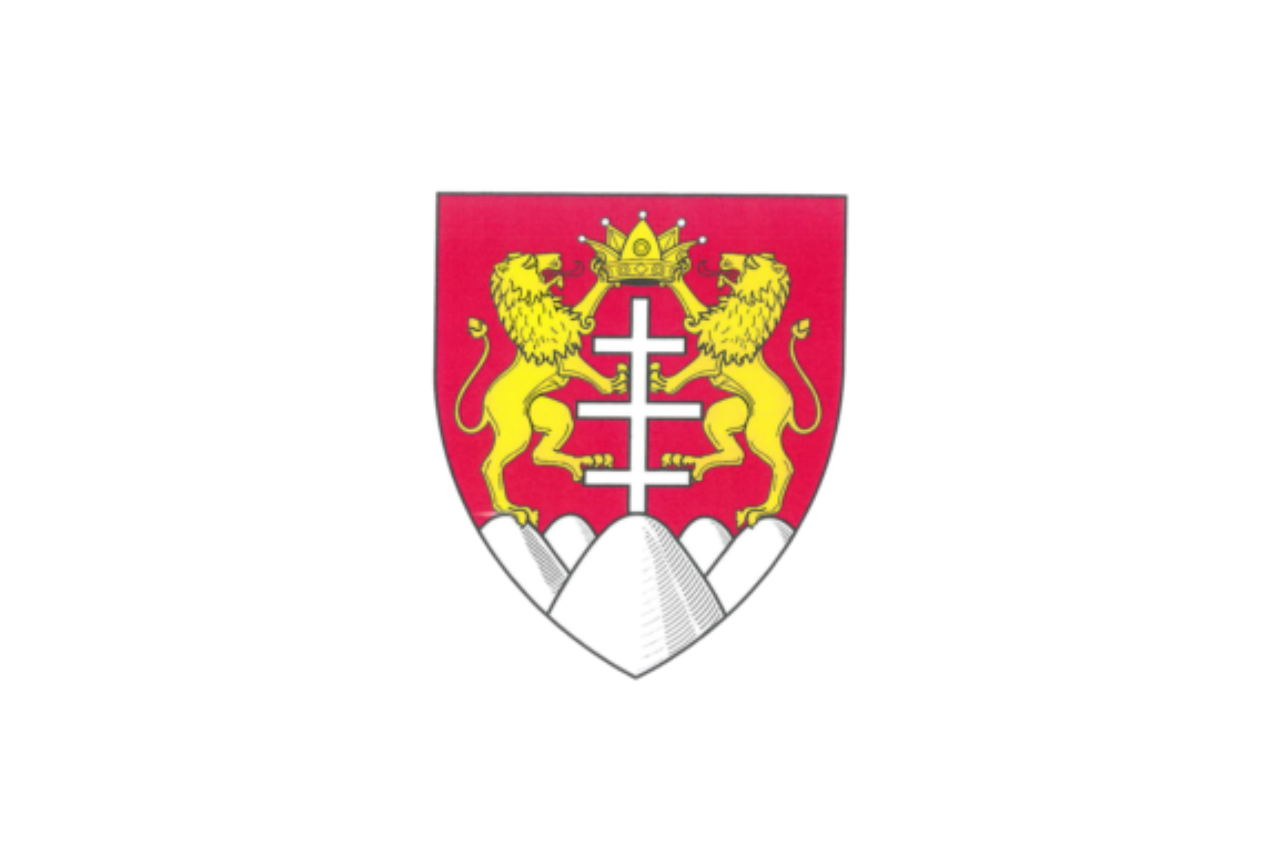
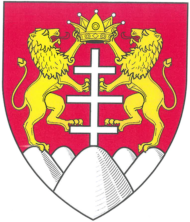
- Flag Coat of arms

- Coordinates: 47.58°N 25.76°E
- Country: Romania
- Development region: Nord-Est
- Historical region: Bukovina, Western Moldavia
- Seat: Suceava

Government
  - President of the County Board: Gheorghe Șoldan (PSD)
  - Prefect: Gheorghe-Alexandru Moldovan

Area
  - Total: 8,553 km^{2} (3,302 sq mi)
  - Rank: 2nd

Population (2021-12-01)
  - Total: 642,551
  - Rank: 8th
  - Density: 75.13/km^{2} (194.6/sq mi)
- Telephone code: (+40) 230 or (+40) 330
- ISO 3166 code: RO-SV
- GDP (nominal): US$3.188 billion (2015)
- GDP per capita: US$5,022 (2015)
- Website: County Council; Prefecture

Suceava County (Romanian pronunciation: [suˈtʃe̯ava]) is a county (Romanian: județ) of Romania. Most of its territory lies in the southern part of the historical region of Bukovina, while the remainder forms part of Western Moldavia proper. The county seat and the most populous urban settlement of the county is Suceava.

== Demographics ==
Historical population
Year	Pop.	±%
1948	439,751	—
1956	507,674	+15.4%
1966	572,781	+12.8%
1977	633,899	+10.7%
1992	700,799	+10.6%
2002	688,435	−1.8%
2011	634,810	−7.8%
2022	642,551	+1.2%
Source: Official Romanian census data

In 2011, as per the official census conducted that year, Suceava County had a population of 634,810, with a population density of 74/km^{2}. The proportion of each constituent ethnic group is displayed below as follows, according to how they were officially recorded:

- Romanians – 96.14%
- Romani – 1.92%
- Ukrainians (including Hutsuls and Rusyns) – 0.92%
- Lipovans – 0.27%
- Germans (namely Bukovina Germans, Zipser Germans/Saxons, and Regat Germans) – 0.11%
- West Slavs (i.e. Poles, Slovaks, and Czechs) as well as minor other ethnic groups (including Hungarians or Szekelers, more specifically the Székelys of Bukovina) – 0.5%

=== Historical population in the 20th and 21st centuries ===
In the recent past, during the early 20th century, Suceava County used to be more ethnically heterogenous or mixed (due to the ethnic legacy and heritage of the former Austro-Hungarian times when most of the territory of the county was part of the Duchy of Bukovina), with sizeable minority populations of Germans (more specifically Bukovina Germans, including Zipsers), Jews, Ukrainians, Poles, or Hungarians (more specifically Székelys of Bukovina). These minority communities gradually dwindled throughout much of the 20th century.

With regard to the Jewish population, according to Encyclopaedia Judaica, in reference to the old (pre-1950), smaller Suceava County: "The local Jews were persecuted by the Nazi German and Romanian authorities between 1940 and 1941. When deported to Transnistria in 1941, they numbered 3,253. Only 27 remained in the town." The total number of Jews deported to Transnistria from Suceava County in October 1941 was 5,942. A Romanian official document from 1946 suggests that most Jews in Suceava County survived the Holocaust. The broader context is that 70% or more than 70% of the southern Bukovinian Jews deported to Transnistria survived the ordeal. On March 14, 1944, Romania's military dictator Ion Antonescu allowed the repatriation of all the Jews deported to Transnistria.

In addition, small German minority groups/communities existed (and still exist) on the territory of Suceava County which forms part of Western Moldavia as well, more specifically Regat Germans (German: Regatsdeutsche) inhabiting the small town of Fălticeni (German: Folitscheni) for example.

Nowadays, during the early 21st century, the county is inhabited mostly by Romanians with very few minority ethnic groups, therefore making it very ethnically homogenous. Additionally, the primary language of the majority of the population is Romanian and the main religion is Eastern Orthodoxy represented by the Romanian Orthodox Church.

== Geography ==
Most of Suceava County is situated in southern Bukovina, which is represented by the darker area on this map. (Note: The rest of the territory encompassed by the county is part of Western Moldavia (i.e. the area coloured in yellow).)

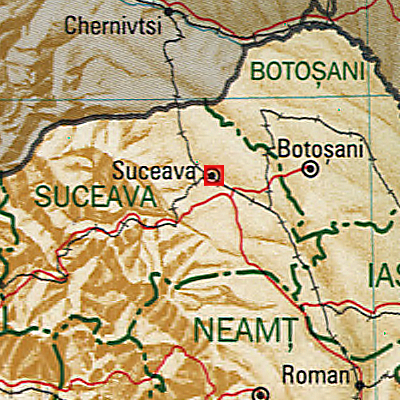
The location of Suceava, the county seat town of Suceava County, in the northeast of Romania. (Note: Due also to its geographic location and historical legacy, Suceava County used to be (and still is to some extent) a county where more ethnicities and cultures live together.)

Two-thirds of the county lies within the southern part of the historical region of Bukovina, while the rest of it incorporates territories from Western Moldavia proper.

In terms of total area, it covers a surface of 8,553 square kilometres (3,302 sq mi), making it thus the second in Romania in this particular regard, just after Timiș County in Banat.

The western side of the county consists of mountains from the Eastern Carpathians group: the Rodna Mountains, the Rarău Mountains, the Giumalău Mountains, and the Ridges of Bukovina, the latter with lower heights.

The county's elevation decreases towards the east, with the lowest height in the Siret River valley. The rivers crossing the county are the Siret River with its tributaries: the Moldova, Suceava, and Bistrița rivers.

=== Neighbours ===
The county of Suceava is bordered by the following other territorial units:

- Ukraine to the north – Chernivtsi Oblast.
- Mureș County, Harghita County, and Neamț County to the south.
- Botoșani County and Iași County to the east.
- Maramureș County and Bistrița-Năsăud County to the west.

== Economy ==
The predominant industries/economic sectors in the county are as follows:

- Lumber – producing the greatest land mass of forests in Romania;
- Food and Cooking;
- Mechanical components;
- Construction materials;
- Mining;
- Textile and leather;
- Tourism.

Suceava occupies the first place among the Romanian cities with the most commercial spaces per inhabitant. Notable supermarket chains correlated with the aforementioned economic areas: Metro, Carrefour, Auchan, Selgros, Kaufland, and Lidl (some of the biggest supermarket chains in Romania).

In June 2022, it was reported that there are projects worth 1 billion EUR for the Suceava County from the PNRR/Next Generation EU plan by County Council president Gheorghe Flutur, former acting/ad interim president of the National Liberal Party (PNL).

== Tourism ==
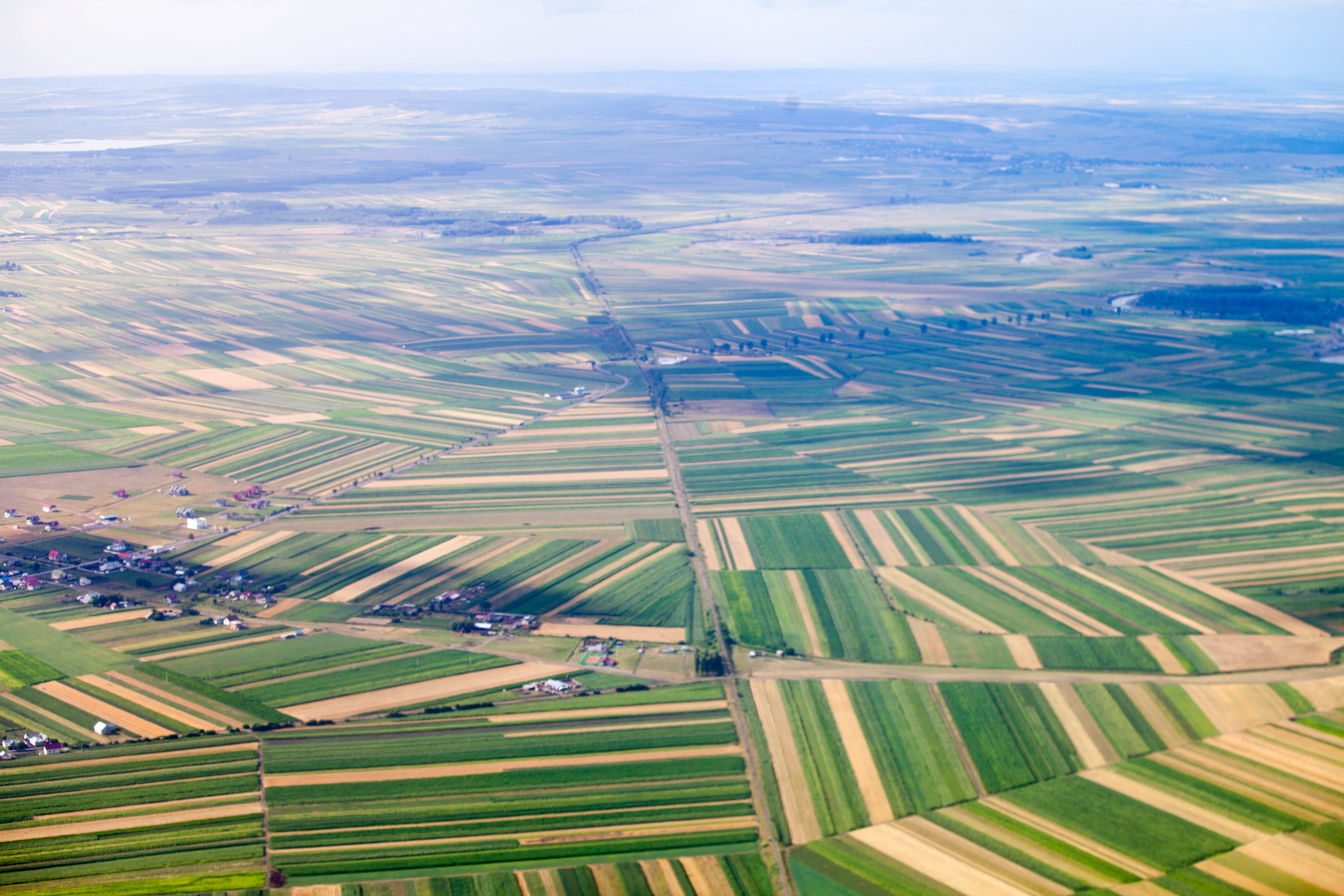
Arable lands near the town of Suceava (2012)

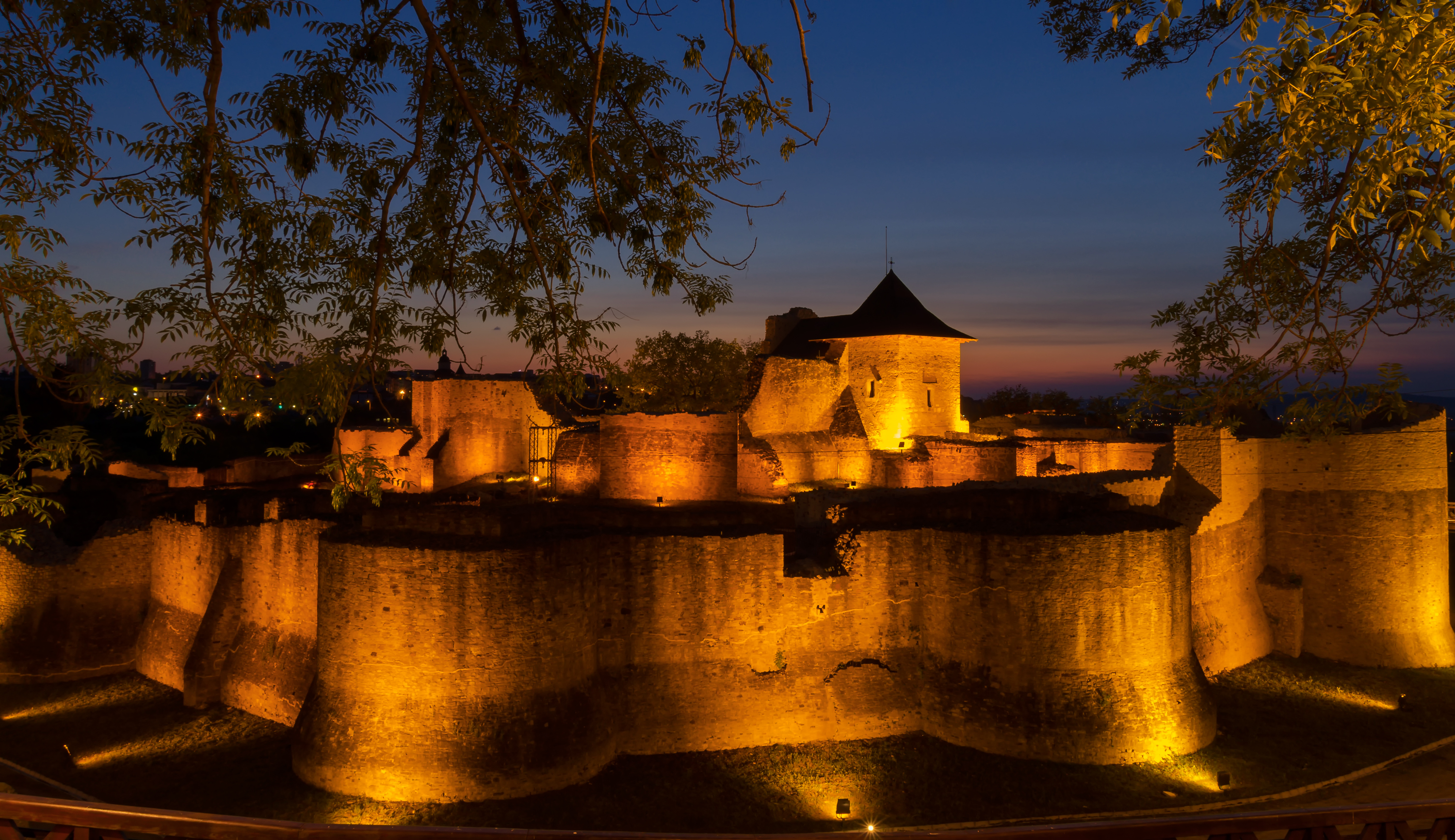
Medieval Seat Fortress of Suceava (2015)

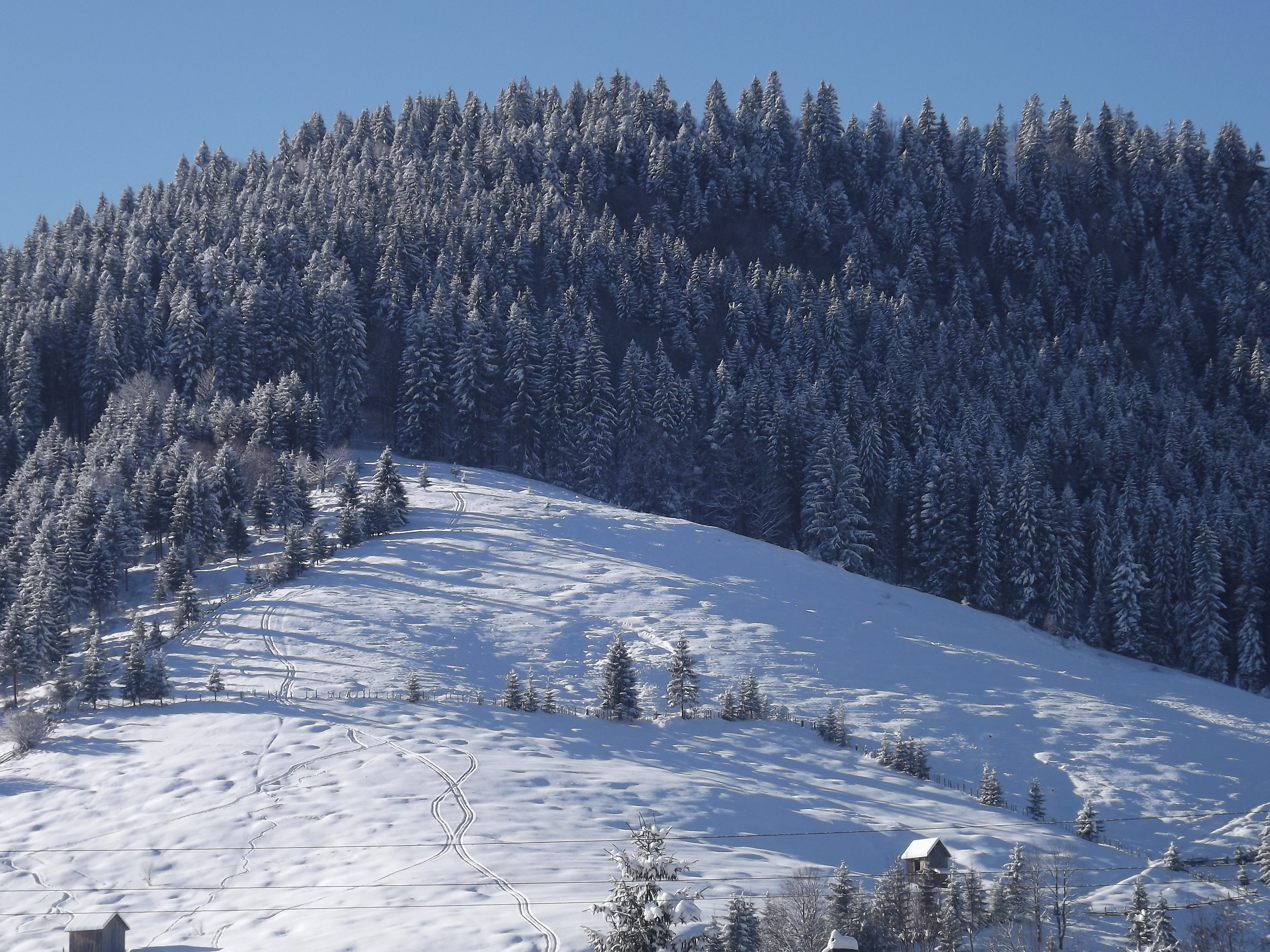
Typical winter landscape in Suceava County (2012)

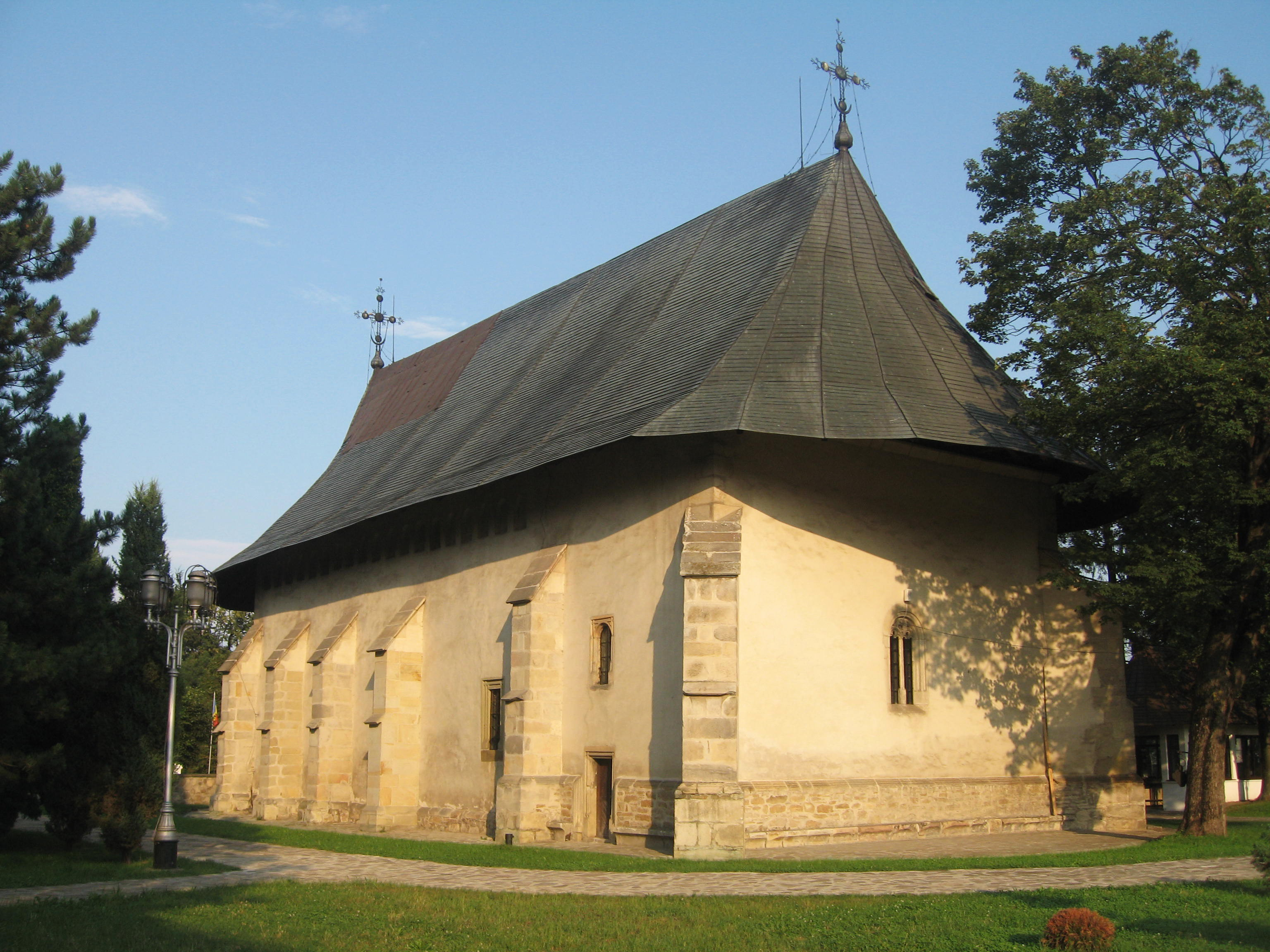
Gothic-style 14th century Bogdana Monastery from Rădăuți (2010)

In 2017, Suceava was ranked 3rd in Romania regarding the total tourist accommodation capacity, after Brașov and Constanța counties. Furthermore, one year later in 2018, Suceava County was designated "European destination of excellence" by the European Commission (EC).

The main tourist attractions of the county are:

- The town of Suceava with its medieval fortifications;
- The Painted churches of northern Moldavia and their monasteries:
  - The Voroneț Monastery;
  - The Putna Monastery;
  - The Moldovița Monastery;
  - The Sucevița Monastery;
  - The Bogdana Monastery from Rădăuți;
  - The Humor Monastery;
  - The Arbore Monastery;
  - The Probota Monastery;
  - The Dragomirna Monastery;
- The medieval salt mine of Cacica (Polish: Kaczyka);
- Mocăniță narrow-gauge steam train network, built during Austrian times, in the Moldovița commune and other rural parts of the county;
- The Vatra Dornei resort;
- The cities and towns of Rădăuți, Fălticeni, Câmpulung Moldovenesc, Gura Humorului, and Siret;
- The Via Transilvanica long-distance hiking and biking trail, which crosses the county.
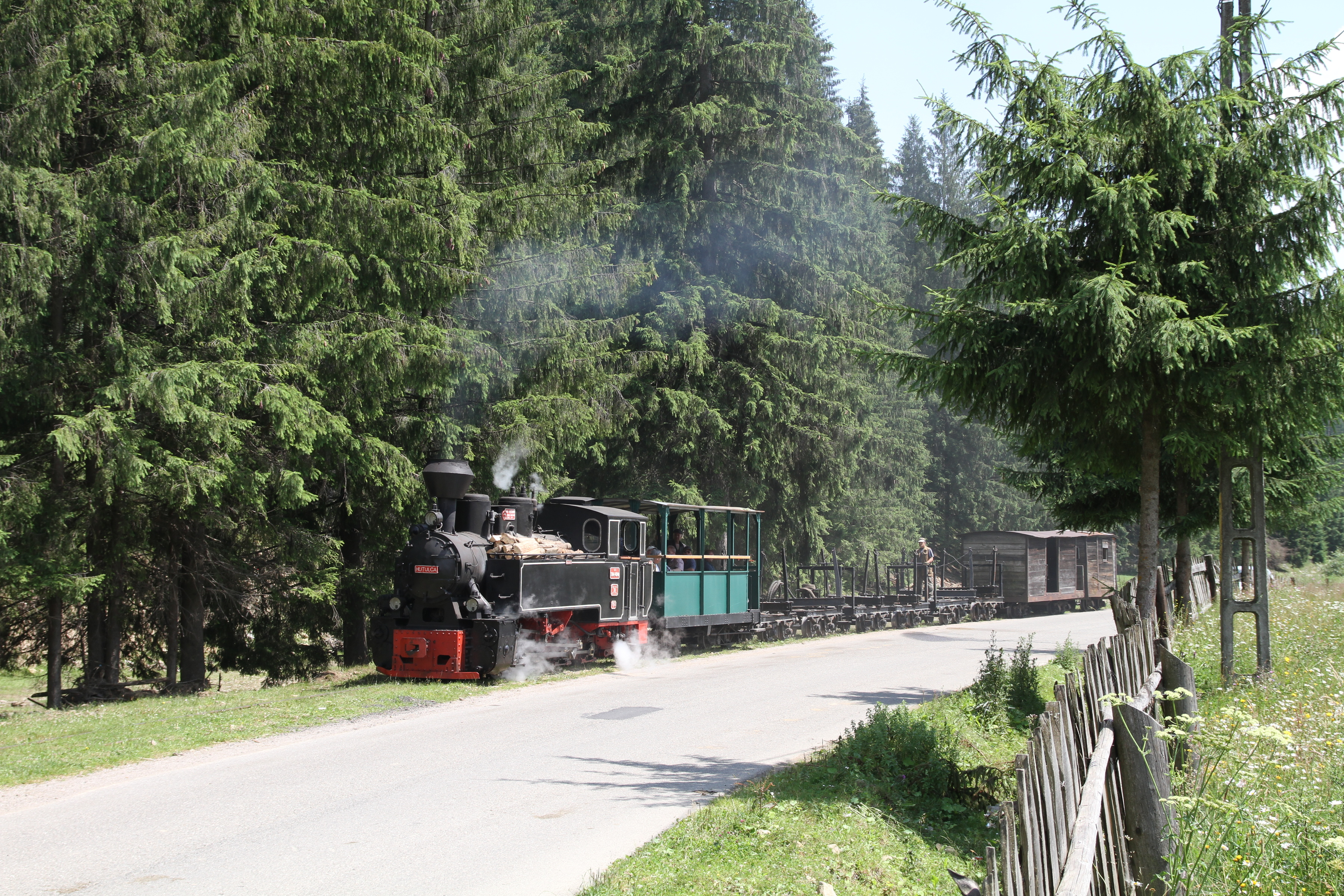
Mocănița-Huțulca-Moldovița narrow-gauge steam train in Moldovița commune (July 2013), a popular touristic attraction of Suceava County.

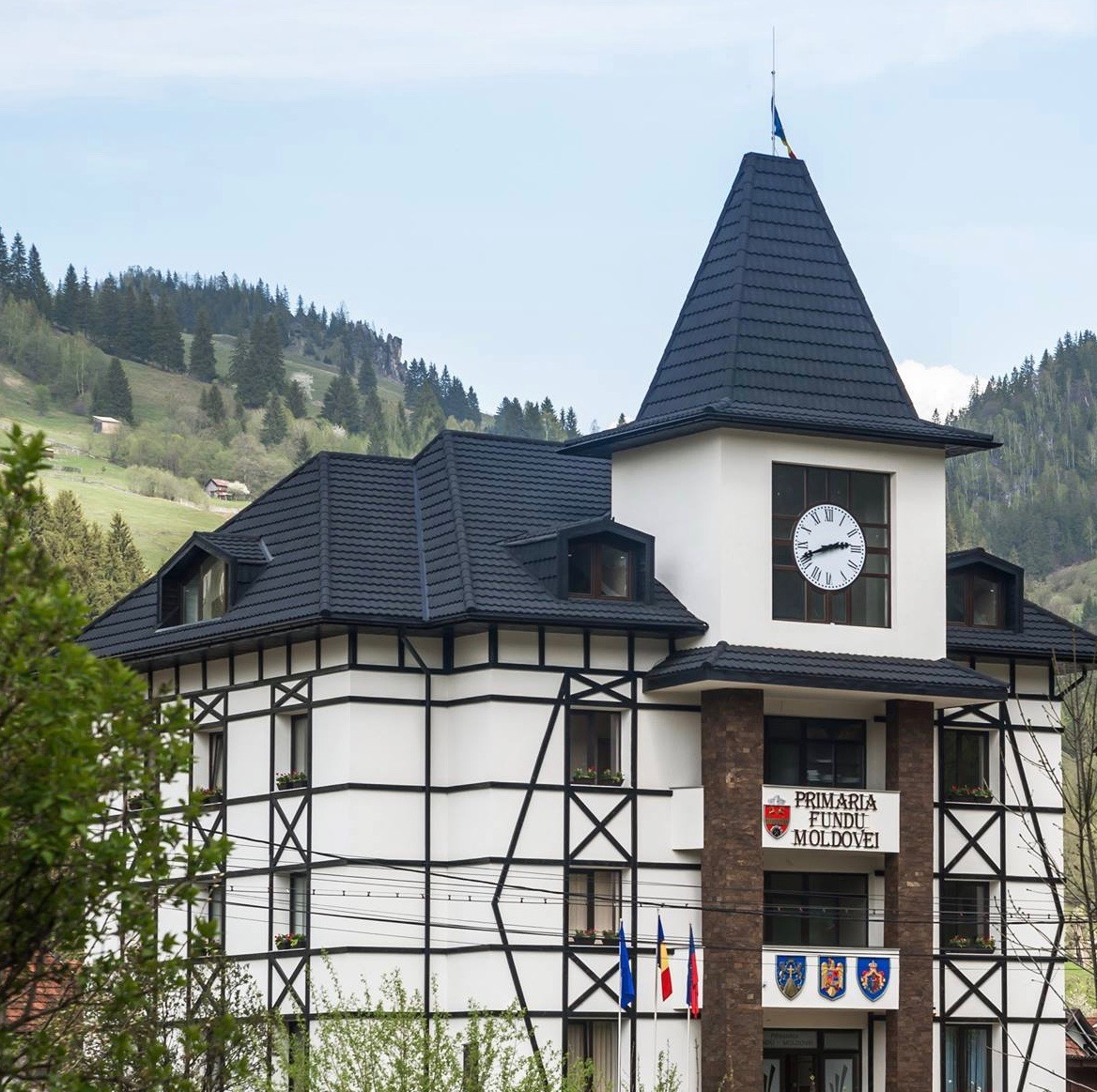
Example of picturesque rural landscape of the countryside of Suceava County in Fundu Moldovei (German: Luisenthal or Louisenthal)

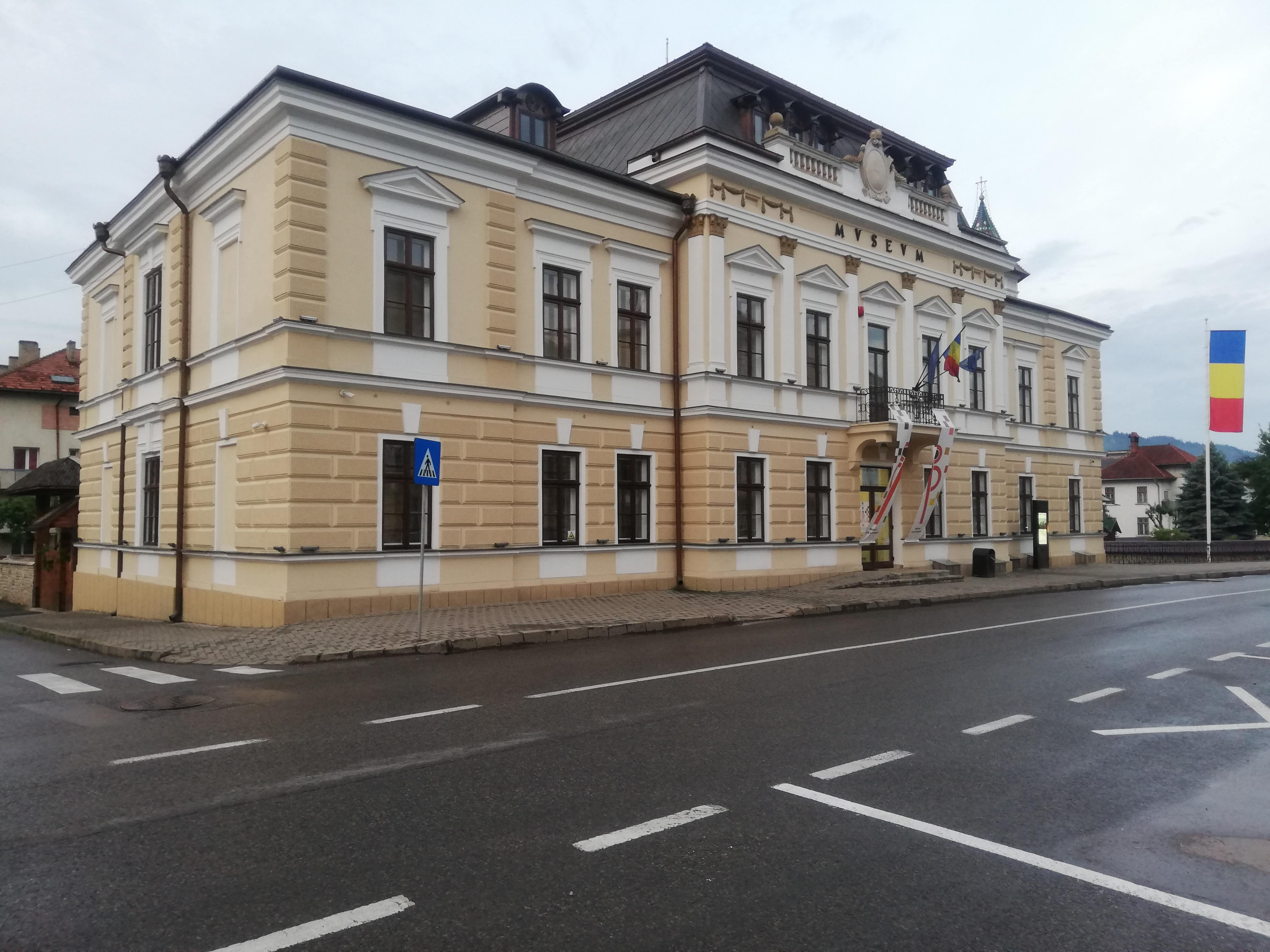
Câmpulung Moldovenesc (German: Kimpolung)

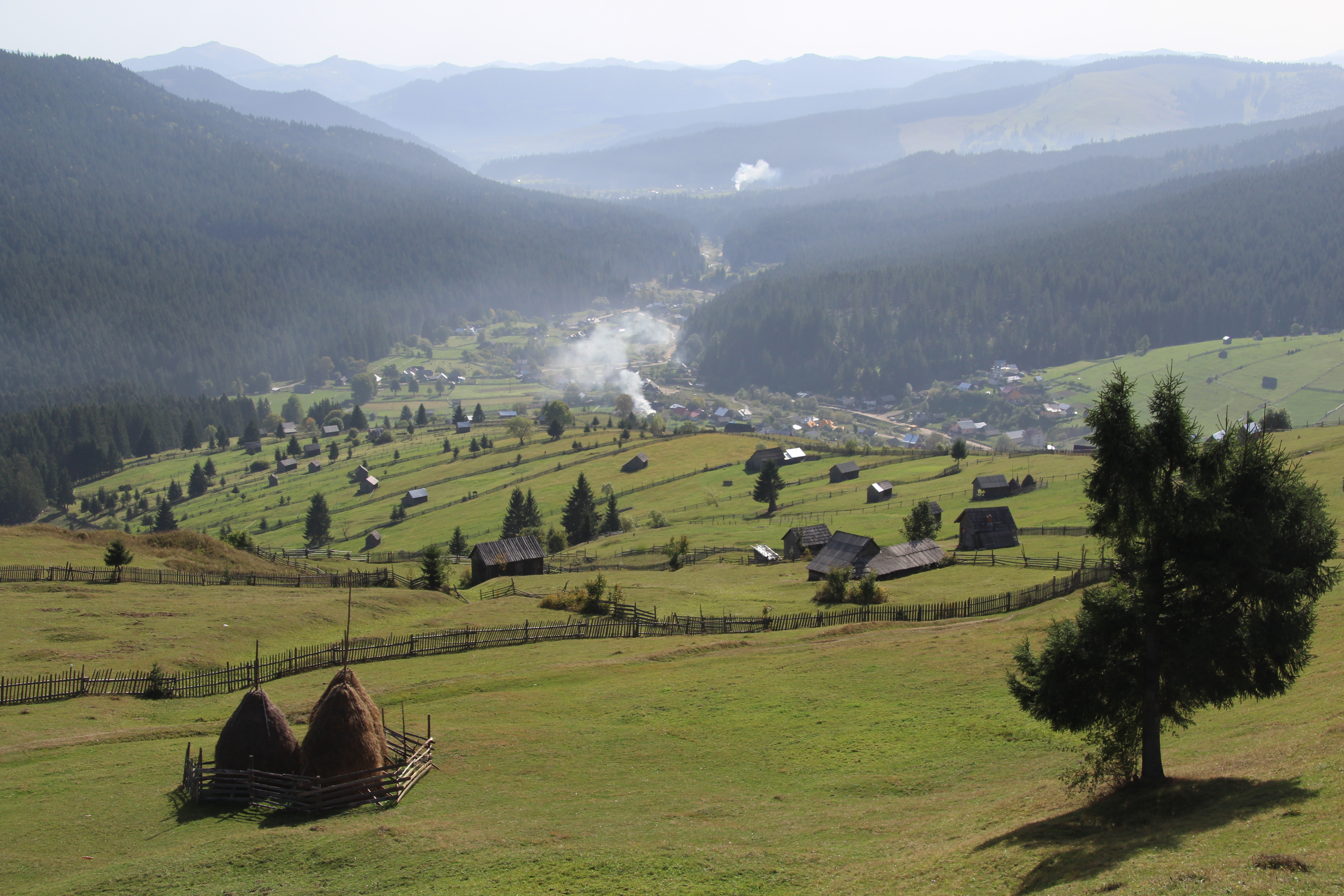
Slătioara secular forest, a UNESCO World Heritage Site, with a waldhufendorf (i.e. forest village) in the background.

== Politics and local administration ==
=== 1992–1996 ===
The elected President of the County Council was Constantin Sofroni (FSN). The Suceava County Council, elected at the 1992 local elections, consisted of 45 councillors, with the following party composition:

Party	Seats	Current County Council
National Salvation Front (FSN)	17	
Romanian Democratic Convention (CDR)	13	
Democratic Agrarian Party of Romania (PDAR)	8	
Ecological Movement of Romania (MER) (Note: Romanian: Mișcarea Ecologistă din România)	2	
National Liberal Party – Youth Wing (PNL-AT)	1	
National Ecologist Party (PNE) (Note: Romanian: Partidul Național Ecologist)	1	
Greater Romania Party (PRM)	1	
Romanian Social Democratic Party (PSDR)	1	
Independent (IND)	1	

=== 1996–2000 ===
The elected President of the County Council was Gavril Mârza (PDSR). The Suceava County Council, elected at the 1996 local elections, consisted of 45 councillors, with the following party composition:

Party	Seats	Current County Council
Romanian Democratic Convention (CDR)	8	
Social Democratic Union (USD) (Note: Electoral alliance consisting of the Democratic Party (PD) and the Romanian Social Democratic Party (PSDR).)	7	
Party of Social Democracy in Romania (PDSR)	7	
Democratic Agrarian Party (PDAR)	3	
Socialist Party of Labour (PSM)	2	
Greater Romania Party (PRM)	2	
Democratic Pensioners' Party From Romania And Diaspora (PDPRD)	2	
Civic Alliance Party (PAC)	2	
National Party of Free Producers in Romania (PNPLR) (Note: Romanian: Partidul Național al Producătorilor Liberi din România)	1	
Ecological Movement of Romania (MER)	1	
National Drivers' Party (PNAR) (Note: Romanian: Partidul Național al Automobiliștilor din România)	1	
Pensioners' Party (PP) (Note: Romanian: Partidul Pensionarilor)	1	
Socialist Party (PS) (Note: Romanian: Partidul Socialist)	1	
National Democratic Christian Party (PNDC) (Note: Romanian: Partidul Național Democrat Creștin)	1	
Romanian Party for the New Society (PRNS) (Note: Romanian: Partidul Român pentru Noua Societate)	1	
Romanian National Unity Party (PUNR)	1	
Union of Poles of Romania (UPR)	1	
Liberal Party '93 (PL '93)	1	
National Liberal Party-Câmpeanu (PNL-C)	1	
Movement For European Integration (MIE) (Note: Romanian: Mișcarea pentru Integrare Europeană)	1	

=== 2000–2004 ===
The elected President of the County Council was Gavril Mârza (PDSR). The Suceava County Council, elected at the 2000 local elections, consisted of 45 councillors, with the following party composition:

Party	Seats	Current County Council
Party of Social Democracy in Romania (PDSR) (Note: Subsequently PSD starting from 2001, when it merged with the Romanian Social Democratic Party (PSDR).)	16	
Greater Romania Party (PRM)	4	
Alliance for Romania (ApR)	4	
Democratic Party (PD)	4	
Romanian Democratic Convention (CDR 2000)	4	
National Liberal Party (PNL)	3	
National Christian Democratic Alliance (ANCD) (Note: Romanian: Alianța Națională Creștin Democrată)	2	
Romanian Social Democratic Party (PSDR)	2	
Romanian National Party (PNR)	2	
Pensioners' Party in Romania (PPR) (Note: Romanian: Partidul Pensionarilor din România)	2	
Romanian National Unity Party (PUNR)	2	

=== 2004–2008 ===
The elected President of the County Council was Gavril Mârza (PSD). The Suceava County Council, elected at the 2004 local elections, consisted of 37 councillors, with the following party composition:

Party	Seats	Current County Council
Social Democratic Party (PSD)	17	
Justice and Truth Alliance (DA) (Note: Electoral alliance consisting of the National Liberal Party (PNL) and the Democratic Party (PD). The PNL won 10 mandates whereas the PD won only 4.)	14	
Greater Romania Party (PRM)	3	
Humanist Party (PUR)	3	

=== 2008–2012 ===
The elected President of the County Council was Gheorghe Flutur (PDL). The Suceava County Council, elected at the 2008 local elections, consisted of 36 councillors, with the following party composition:

Party	Seats	Current County Council
Democratic Liberal Party (PDL)	18	
Social Democratic Party (PSD)	14	
National Liberal Party (PNL)	4	

=== 2012–2016 ===
The elected President of the County Council was Cătălin Nechifor (PSD/USL). The Suceava County Council, elected at the 2012 local elections, consisted of 36 councillors, with the following party composition:

Party	Seats	Current County Council
Social Liberal Union (USL)	18	
Democratic Liberal Party (PDL)	15	
People's Party – Dan Diaconescu (PP-DD)	3	

=== 2016–2020 ===
The elected President of the County Council was Gheorghe Flutur (PNL). The Suceava County Council, elected at the 2016 local elections, consisted of 37 councillors, with the following party composition:

Party	Seats	Current County Council
National Liberal Party (PNL)	21	
Social Democratic Party (PSD)	16	

=== 2020–2024 ===
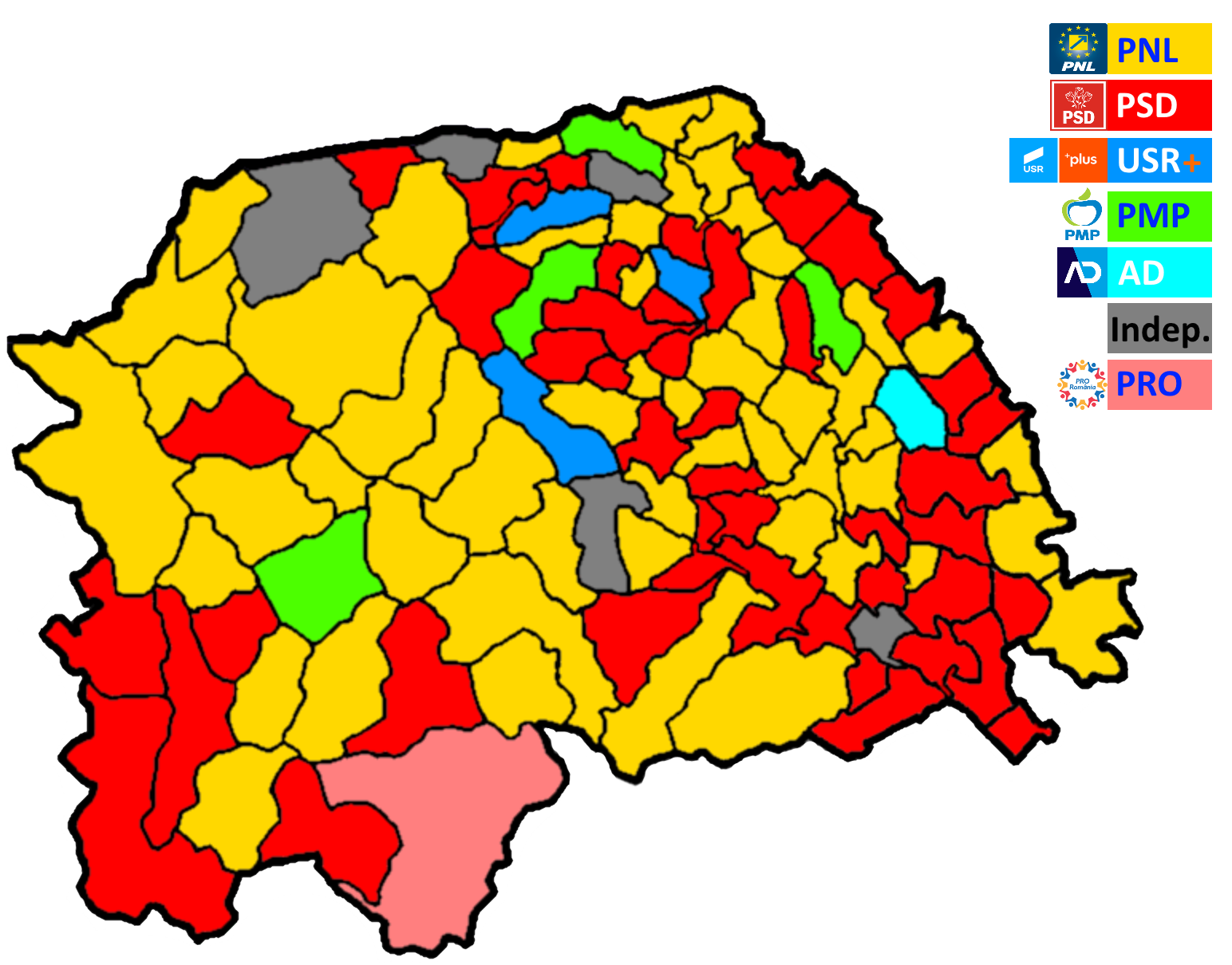
Political map of Suceava County after the 2020 Suceava County local elections by colour of the elected mayor.

The elected President of the County Council was Gheorghe Flutur (PNL). The Suceava County Council, renewed at the 2020 local elections, consisted of 36 county councillors, with the following party composition:

Party	Seats	Current County Council
National Liberal Party (PNL)	18	
Social Democratic Party (PSD)	13	
People's Movement Party (PMP)	5	

=== 2024–present ===
The elected President of the County Council is Gheorghe Șoldan (PSD). The Suceava County Council, renewed at the 2024 local elections, consists of 36 county councillors, with the following party composition:

Party	Seats	Current County Council
Social Democratic Party (PSD)	17	
National Liberal Party (PNL)	15	
Alliance for the Union of Romanians (AUR)	4	

== Administrative divisions ==
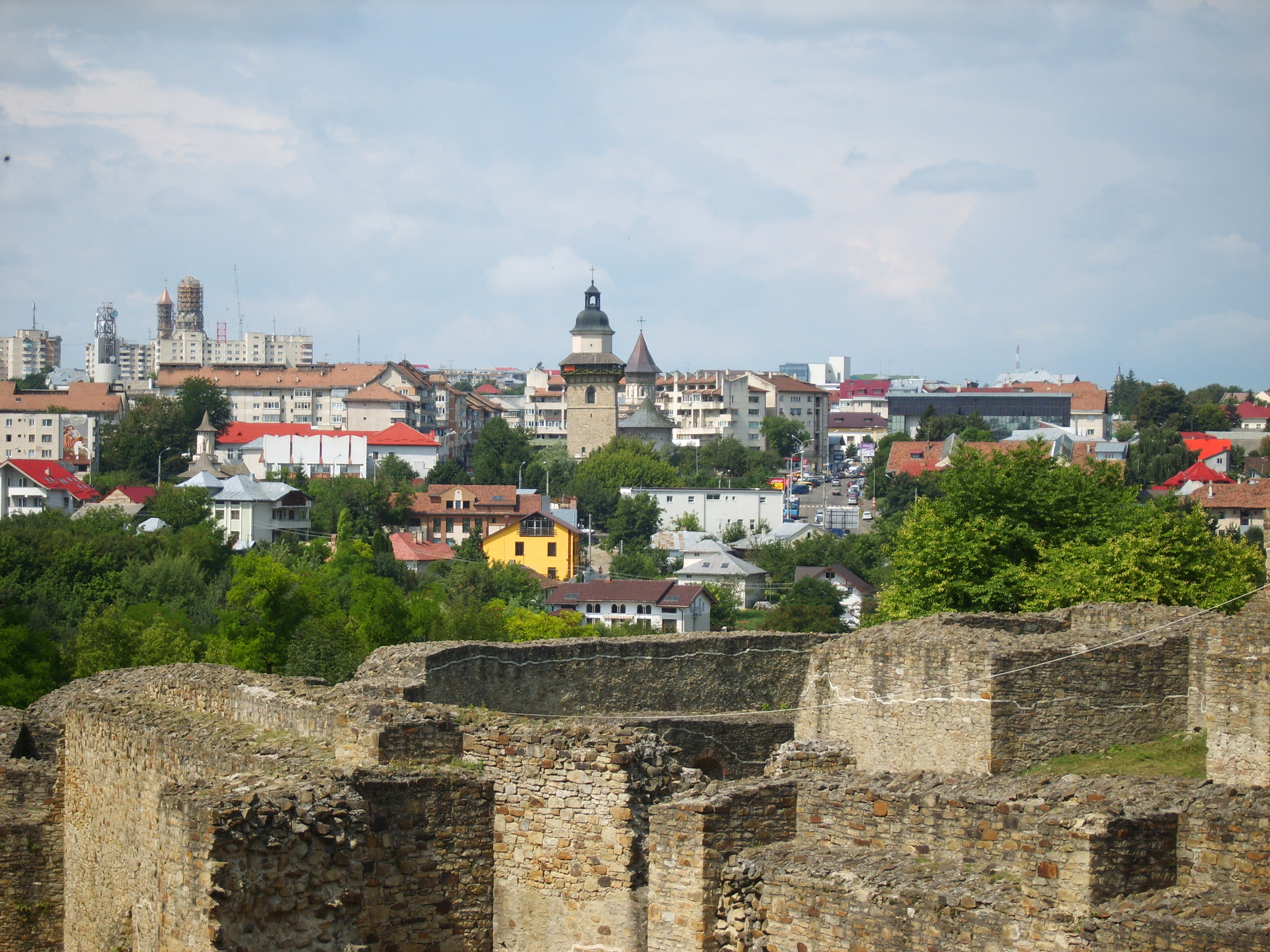
Suceava (German: Sedschopff, Sotschen, Suczawa, or Sutschawa)

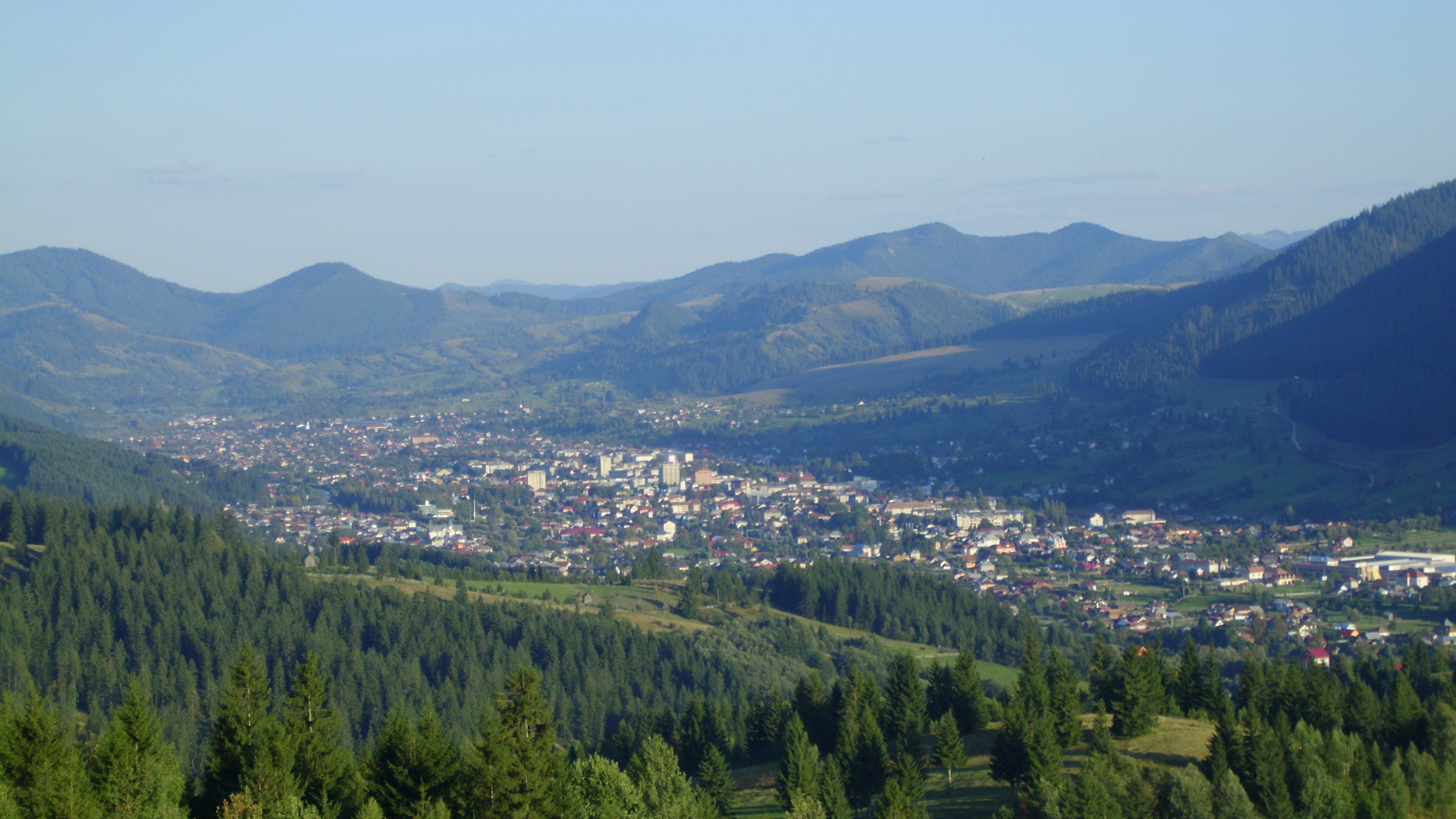
Câmpulung Moldovenesc (German: Kimpolung)

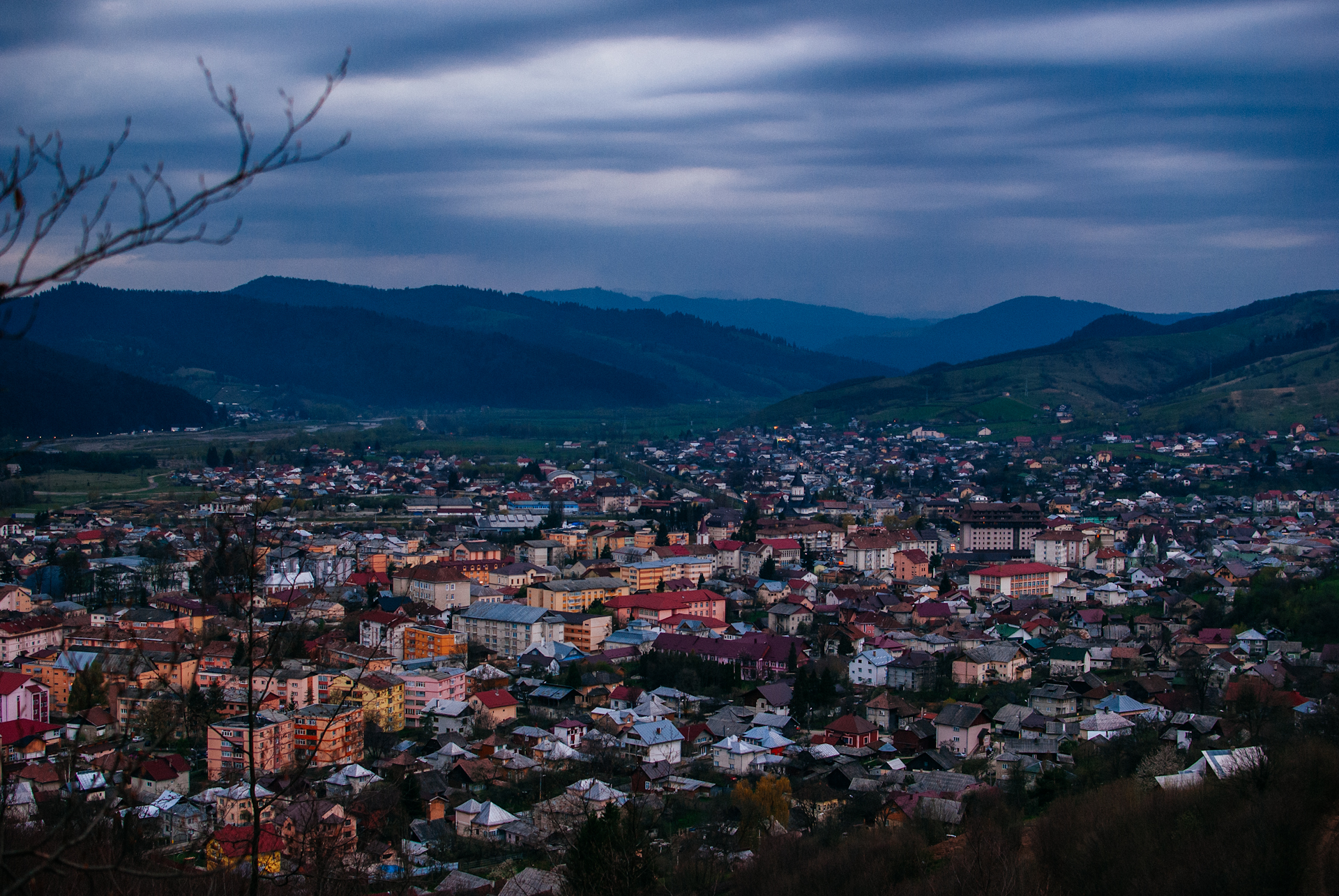
Gura Humorului (German: Gura Humora)

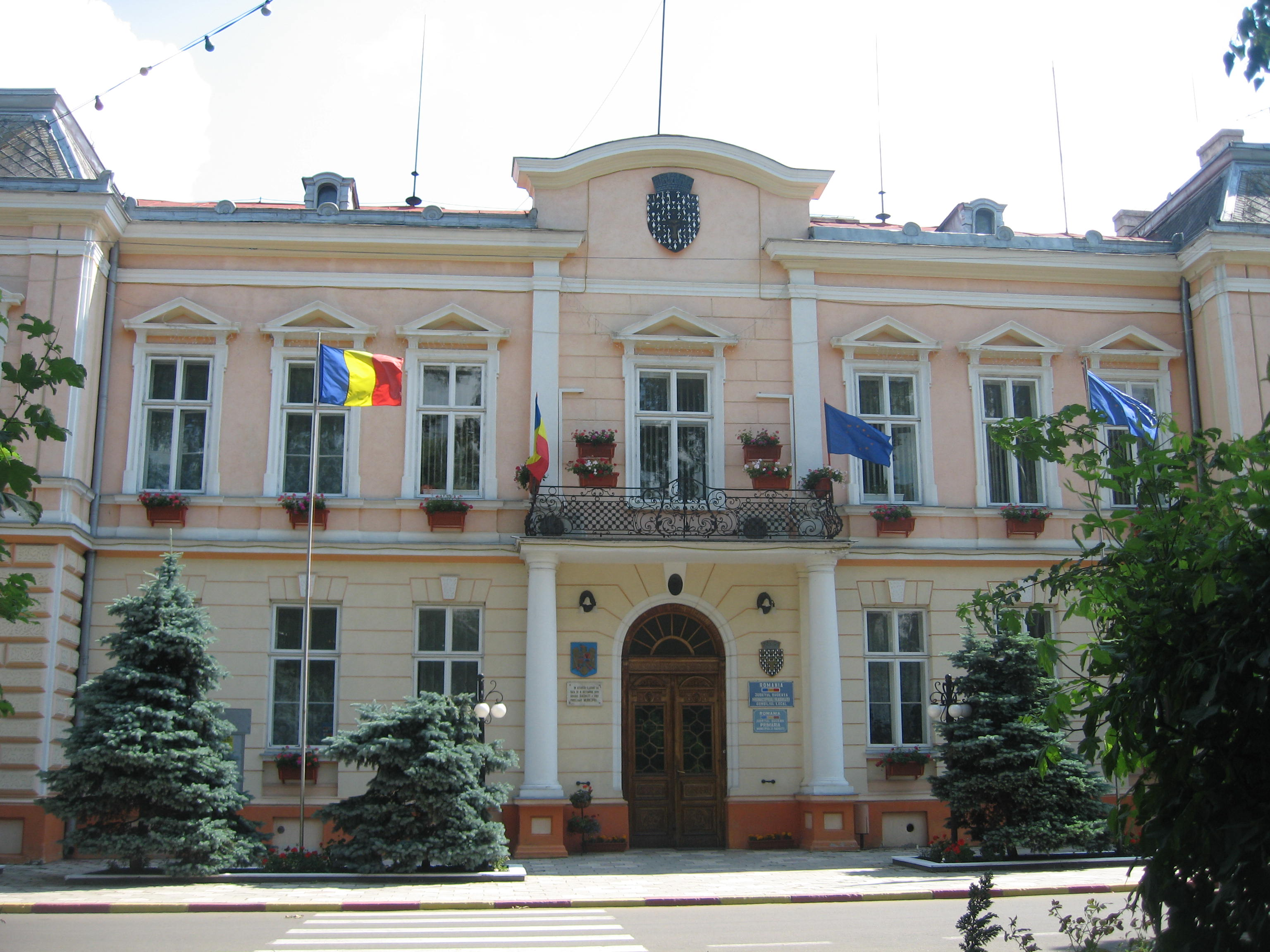
Rădăuți (German: Radautz)

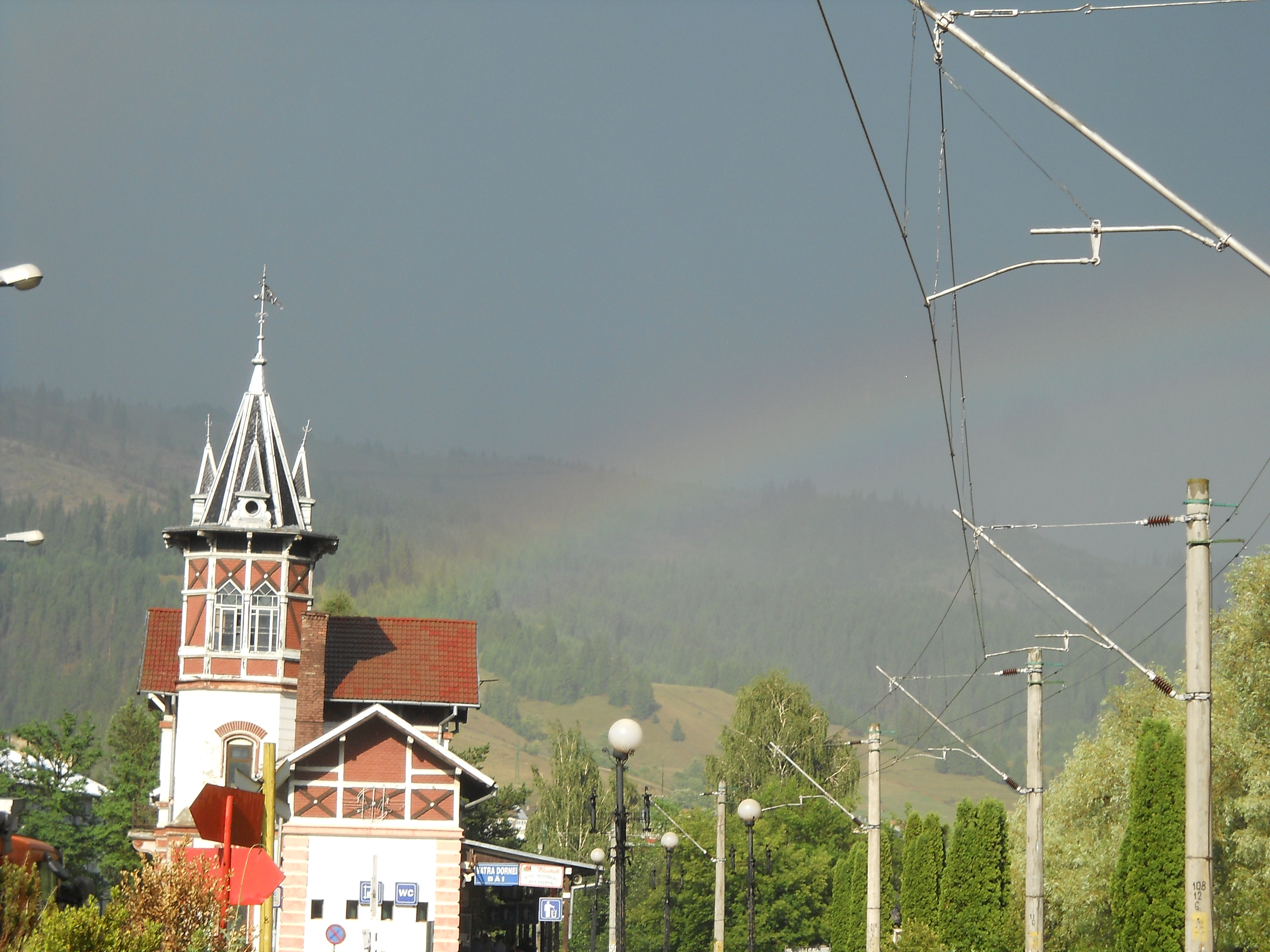
Vatra Dornei (German: Dorna-Watra)

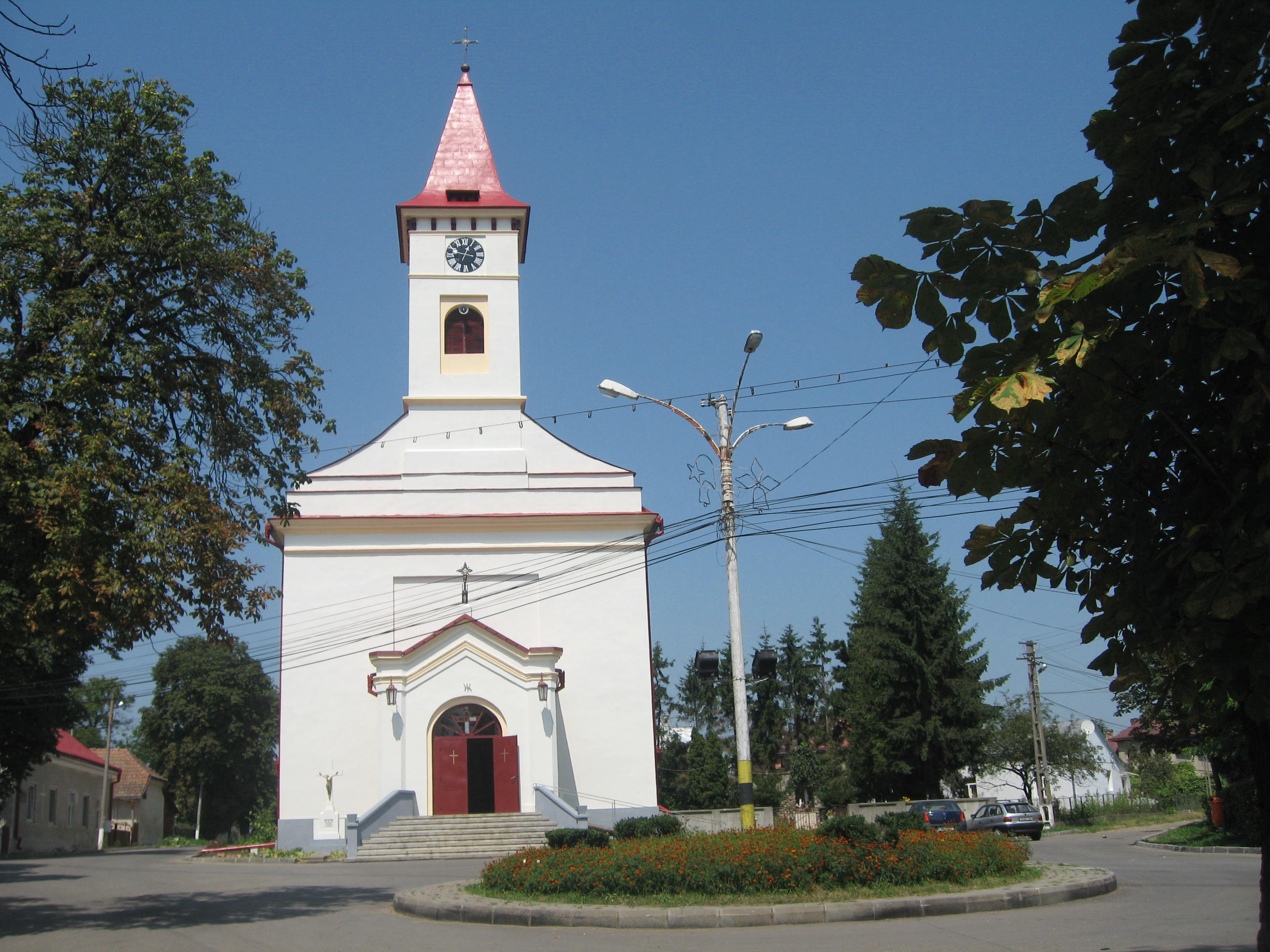
Siret (German: Sereth)

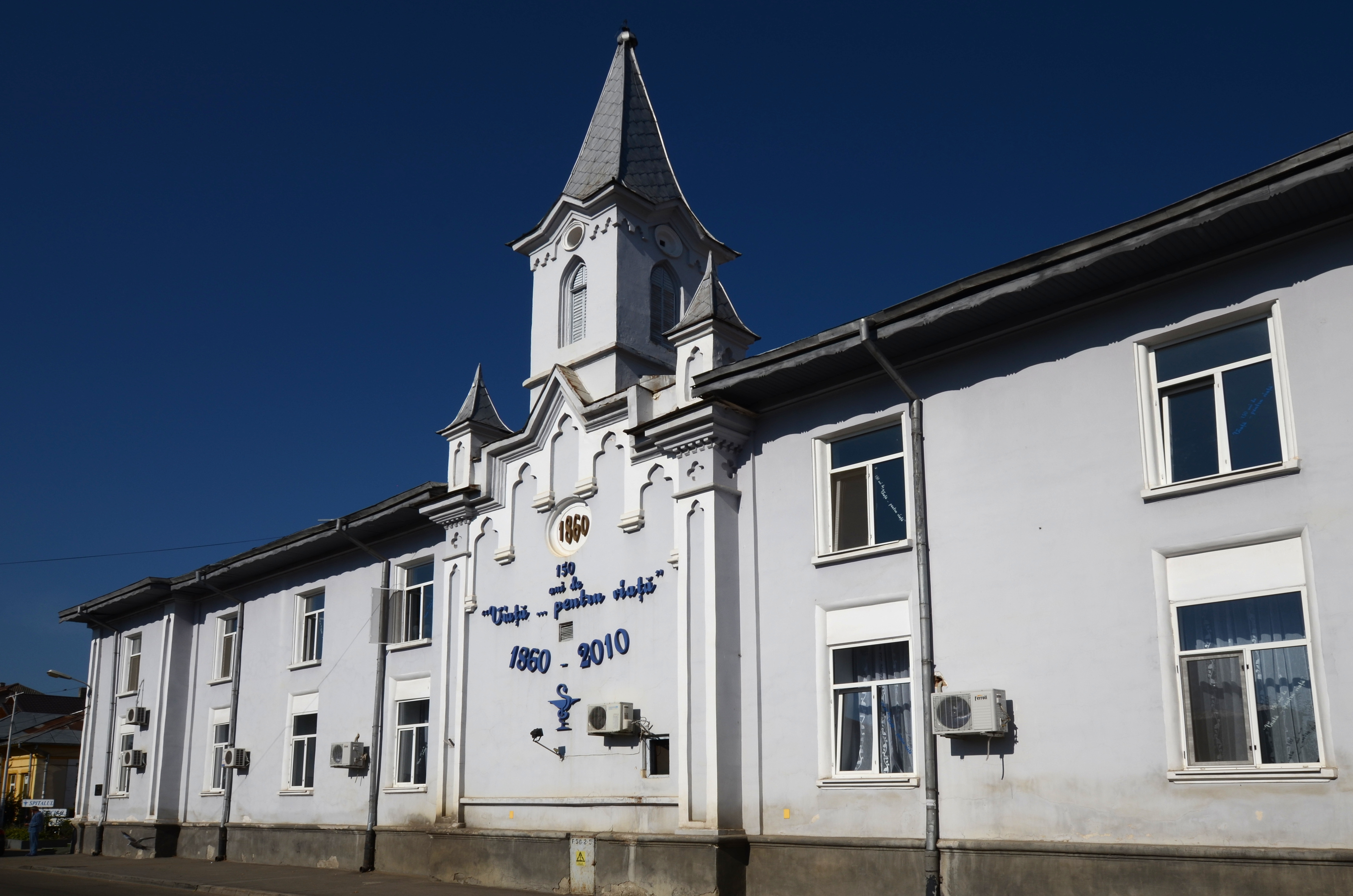
Fălticeni (German: Foltischeni)

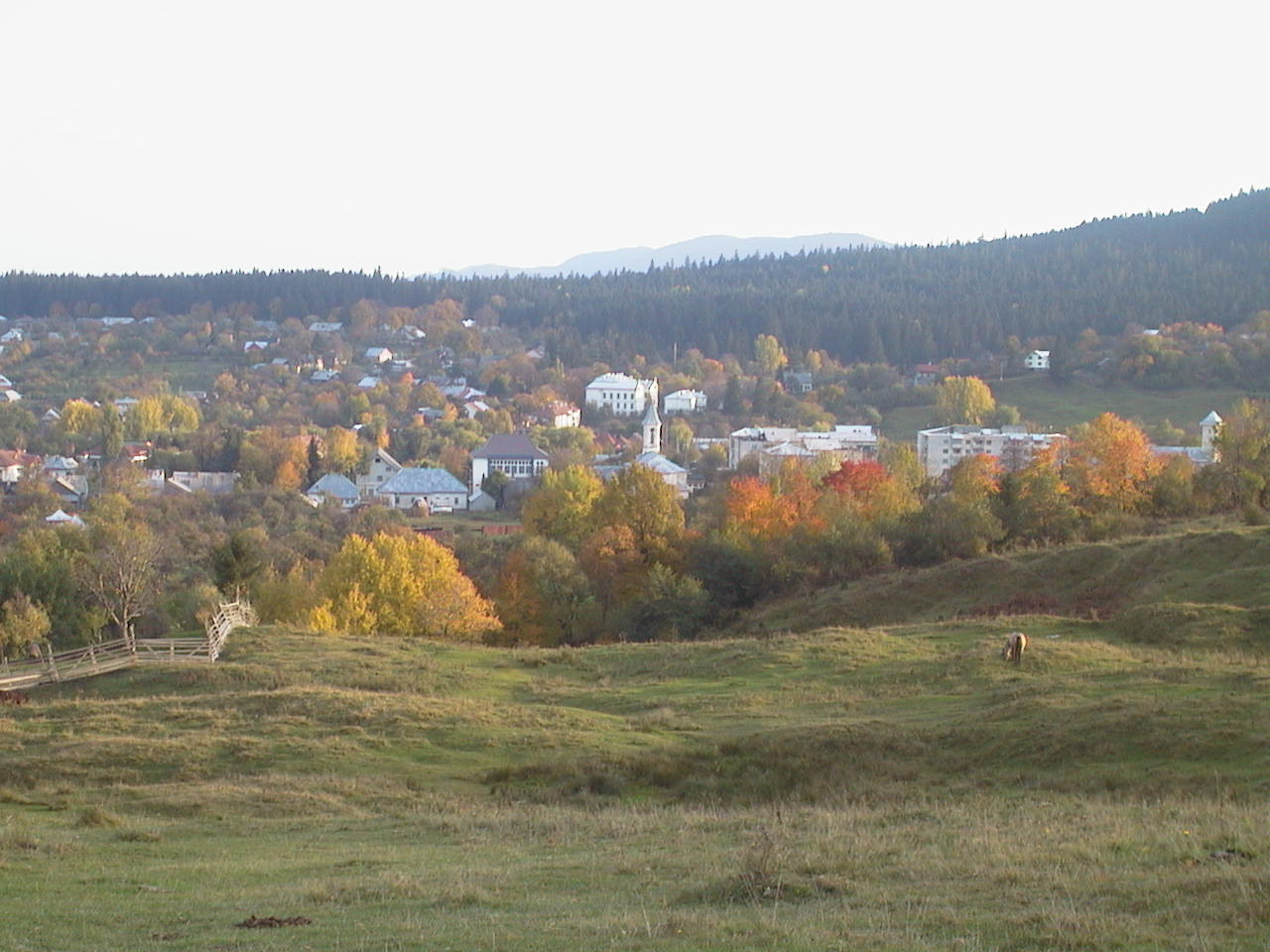
Solca (German: Solka)

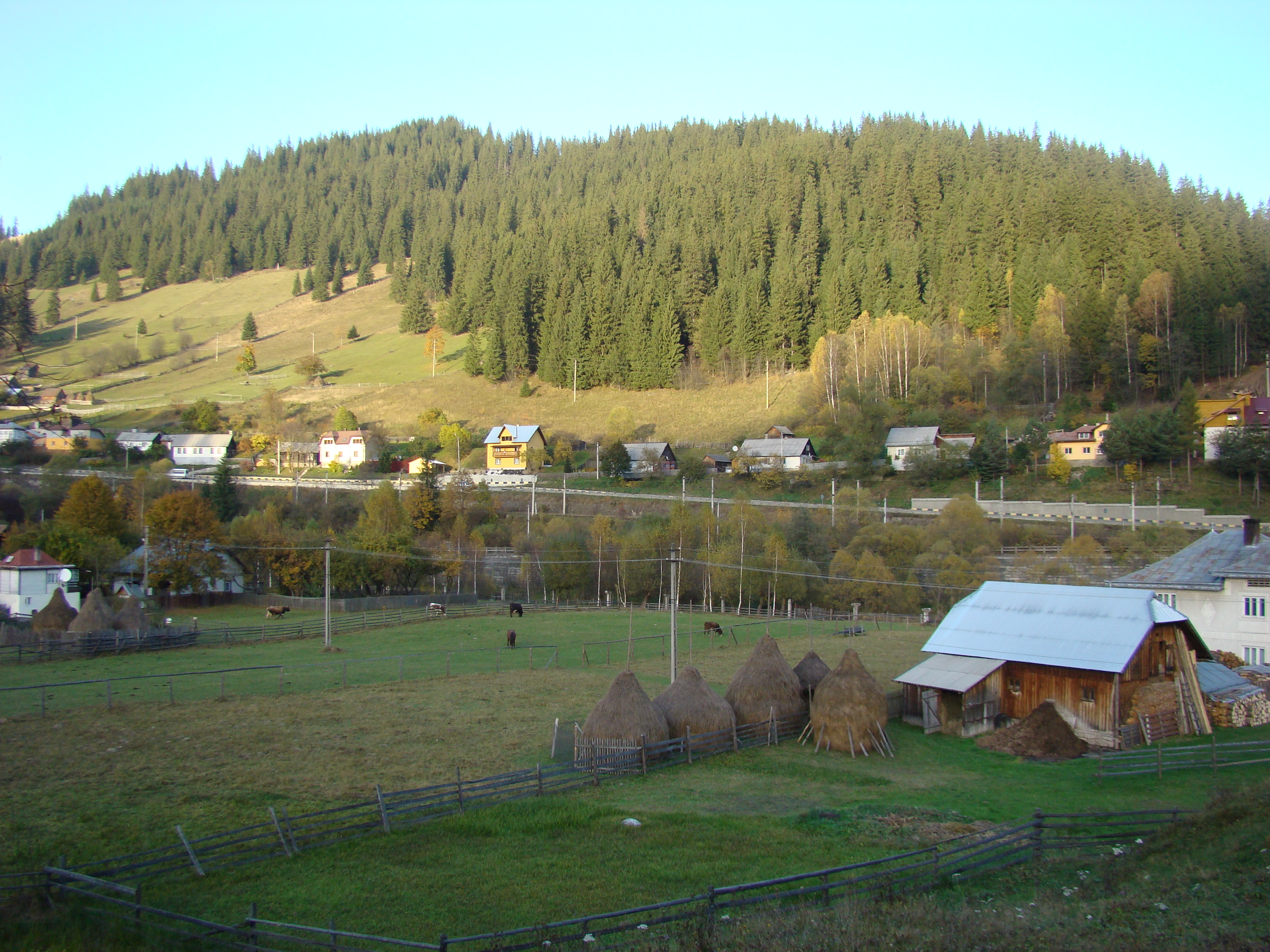
Iacobeni (German: Jakobeny)

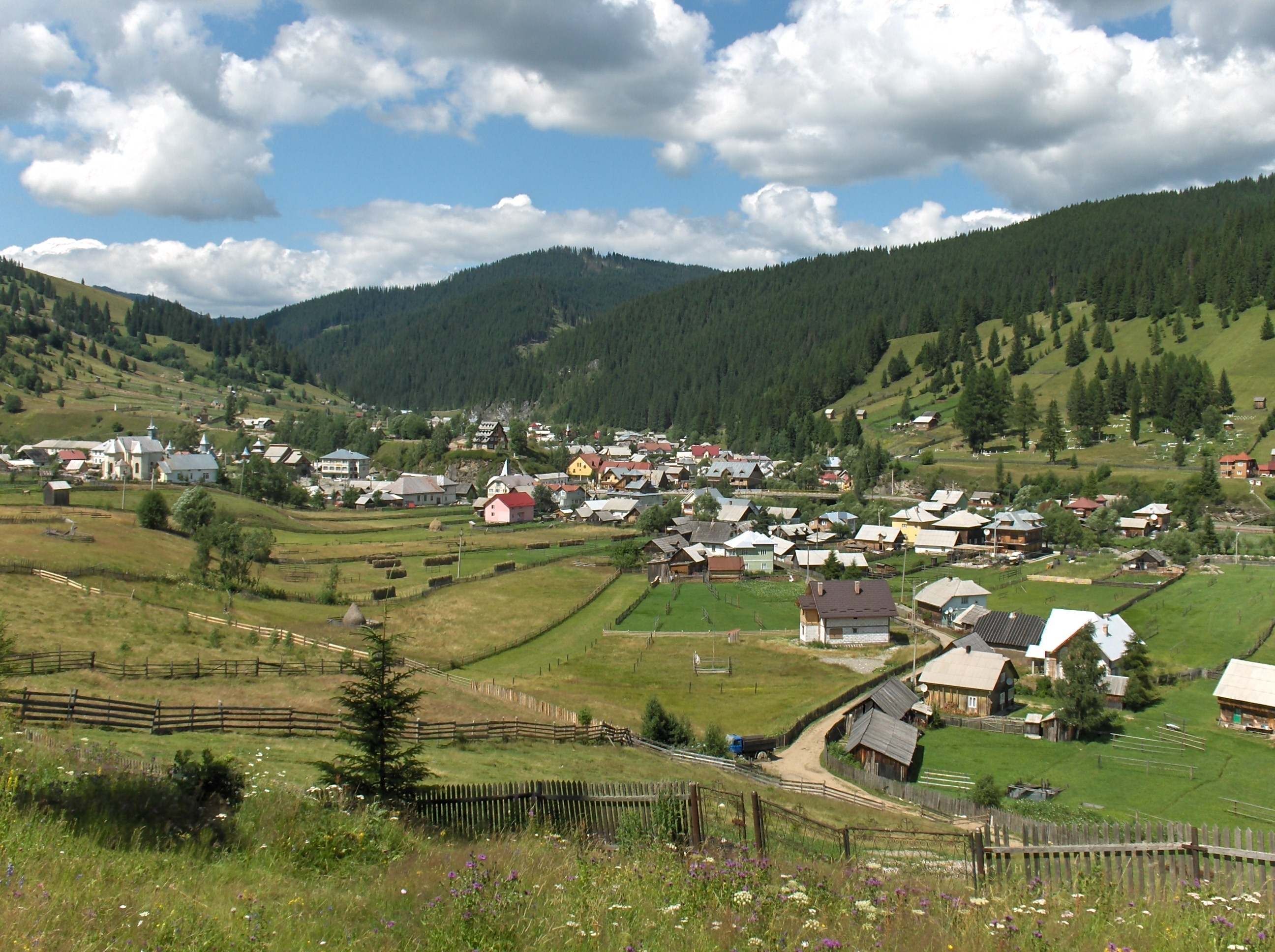
Cârlibaba (German: Mariensee or Ludwigsdorf)

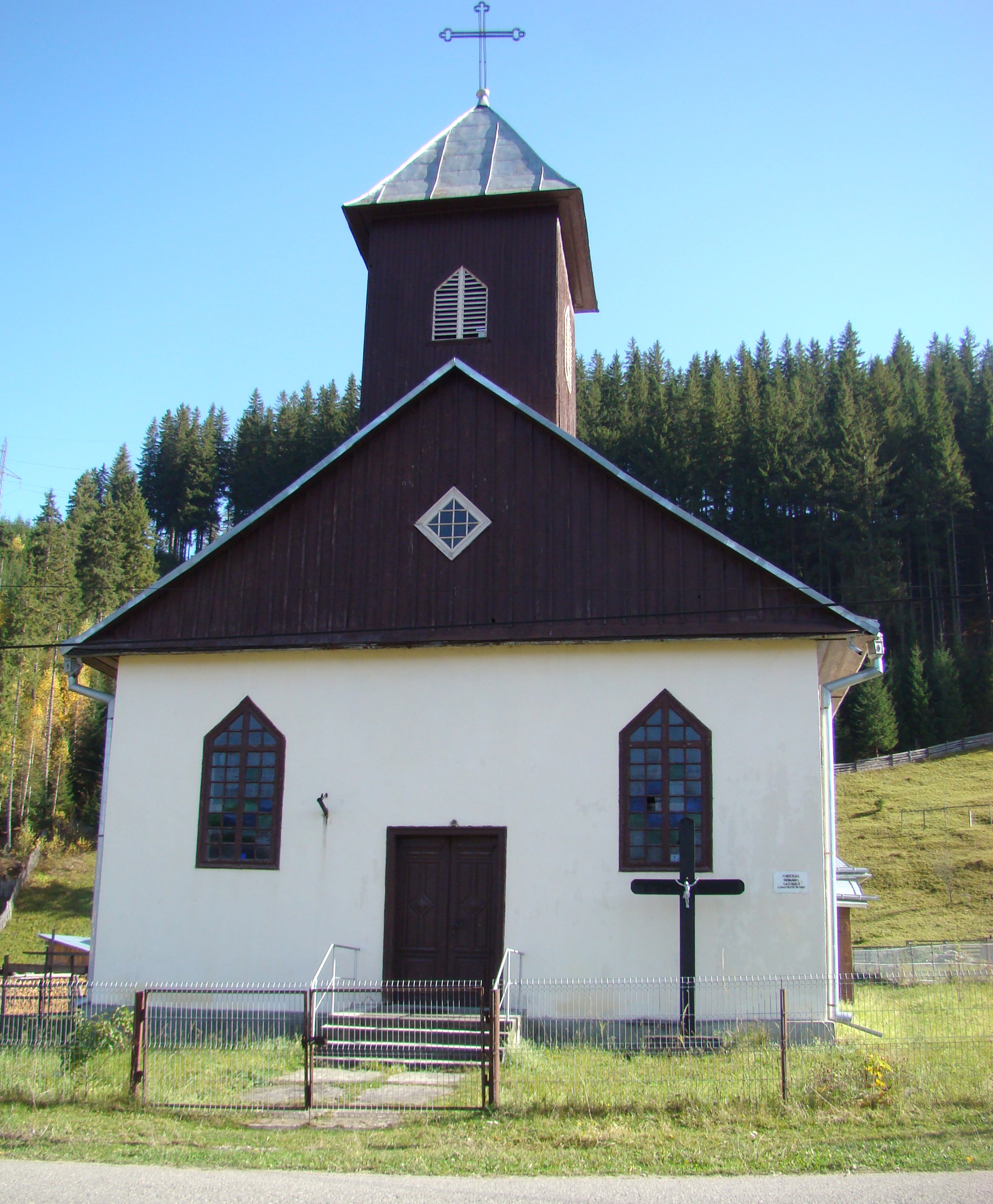
Pojorâta (German: Pozoritta or Poschoritta)

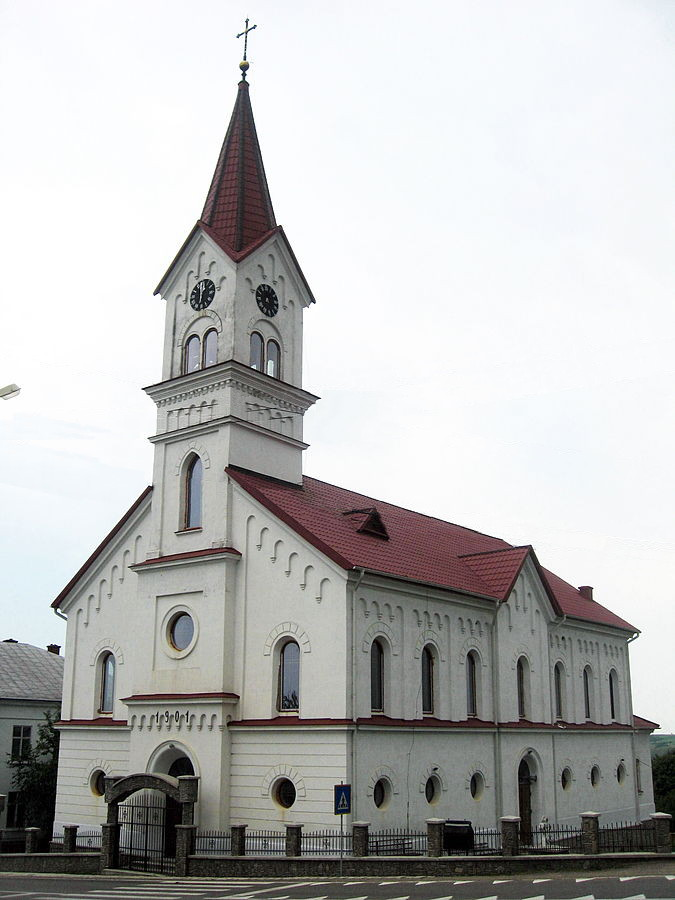
Ilișești (German: Illischestie)

Suceava County has 5 municipalities, 11 towns, and 98 communes.

- Municipalities
  - Câmpulung Moldovenesc
  - Fălticeni
  - Rădăuți
  - Suceava – county seat (Romanian: Oraș reședință de județ); population within town limits: 124,161 (as of 2018)
  - Vatra Dornei
- Towns
  - Broșteni
  - Cajvana
  - Dolhasca
  - Frasin
  - Gura Humorului
  - Liteni
  - Milișăuți
  - Salcea
  - Siret
  - Solca
  - Vicovu de Sus
- Communes
  - Adâncata
  - Arbore
  - Baia
  - Bălăceana
  - Bălcăuți
  - Berchișești
  - Bilca
  - Bogdănești
  - Boroaia
  - Bosanci
  - Botoșana
  - Breaza
  - Brodina
  - Bunești
  - Burla
  - Cacica
  - Calafindești
  - Capu Câmpului
  - Cârlibaba
  - Ciocănești
  - Ciprian Porumbescu
  - Comănești
  - Cornu Luncii
  - Coșna
  - Crucea
  - Dărmănești
  - Dolhești
  - Dorna-Arini
  - Dorna Candrenilor
  - Dornești
  - Drăgoiești
  - Drăgușeni
  - Dumbrăveni
  - Fântâna Mare
  - Fântânele
  - Forăști
  - Frătăuții Noi
  - Frătăuții Vechi
  - Frumosu
  - Fundu Moldovei
  - Gălănești
  - Grămești
  - Grănicești
  - Hănțești
  - Hârtop
  - Horodnic de Jos
  - Horodnic de Sus
  - Horodniceni
  - Iacobeni
  - Iaslovăț
  - Ilișești
  - Ipotești
  - Izvoarele Sucevei
  - Mălini
  - Mănăstirea Humorului
  - Marginea
  - Mitocu Dragomirnei
  - Moara
  - Moldova-Sulița
  - Moldovița
  - Mușenița
  - Ostra
  - Păltinoasa
  - Panaci
  - Pârteștii de Jos
  - Pătrăuți
  - Poiana Stampei
  - Poieni-Solca
  - Pojorâta
  - Preutești
  - Putna
  - Rădășeni
  - Râșca
  - Sadova
  - Șaru Dornei
  - Satu Mare
  - Șcheia
  - Șerbăuți
  - Siminicea
  - Slatina
  - Straja
  - Stroiești
  - Stulpicani
  - Sucevița
  - Todirești
  - Udești
  - Ulma
  - Vadu Moldovei
  - Valea Moldovei
  - Vama
  - Vatra Moldoviței
  - Verești
  - Vicovu de Jos
  - Voitinel
  - Volovăț
  - Vulturești
  - Zamostea
  - Zvoriștea

== 2010 floods ==
During June 2010, Gheorghe Flutur, at that time (as now) the president of Suceava County Council, stated in a Mediafax interview that his county was one of the worst hit in the country. In the morning of June 29, relief work was coordinated to deal with the flooding that killed 21 people and caused hundreds to be evacuated from their homes.

== Gallery ==
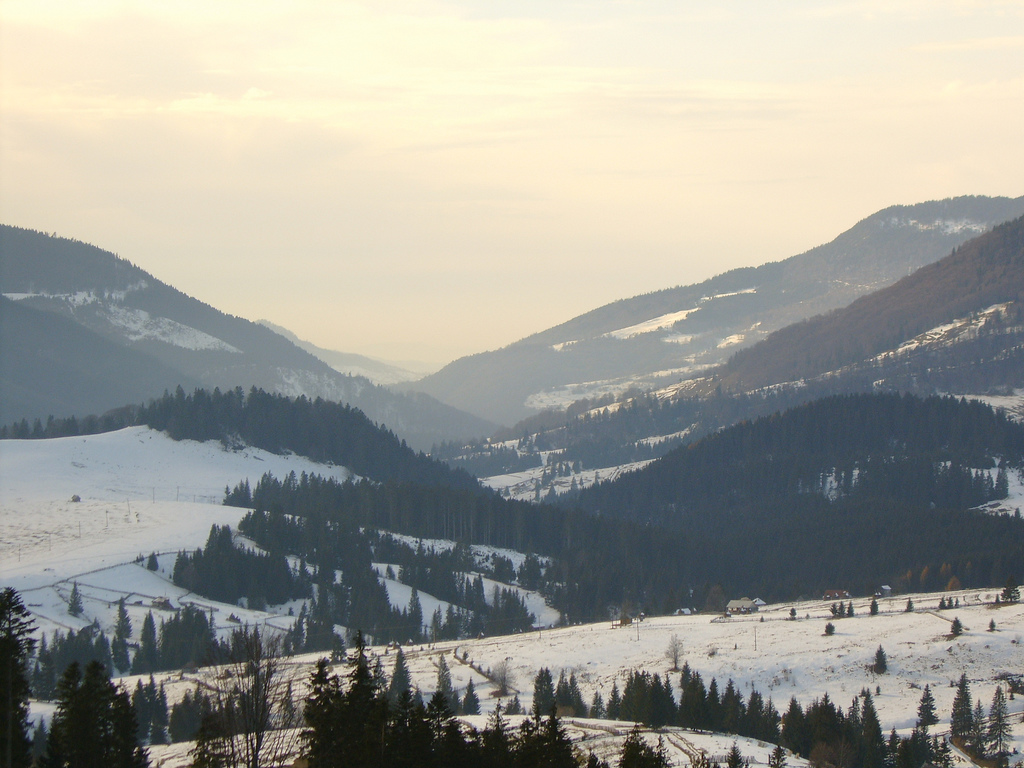
Tihuța Pass – connecting Bukovina to neighbouring westward Transylvania

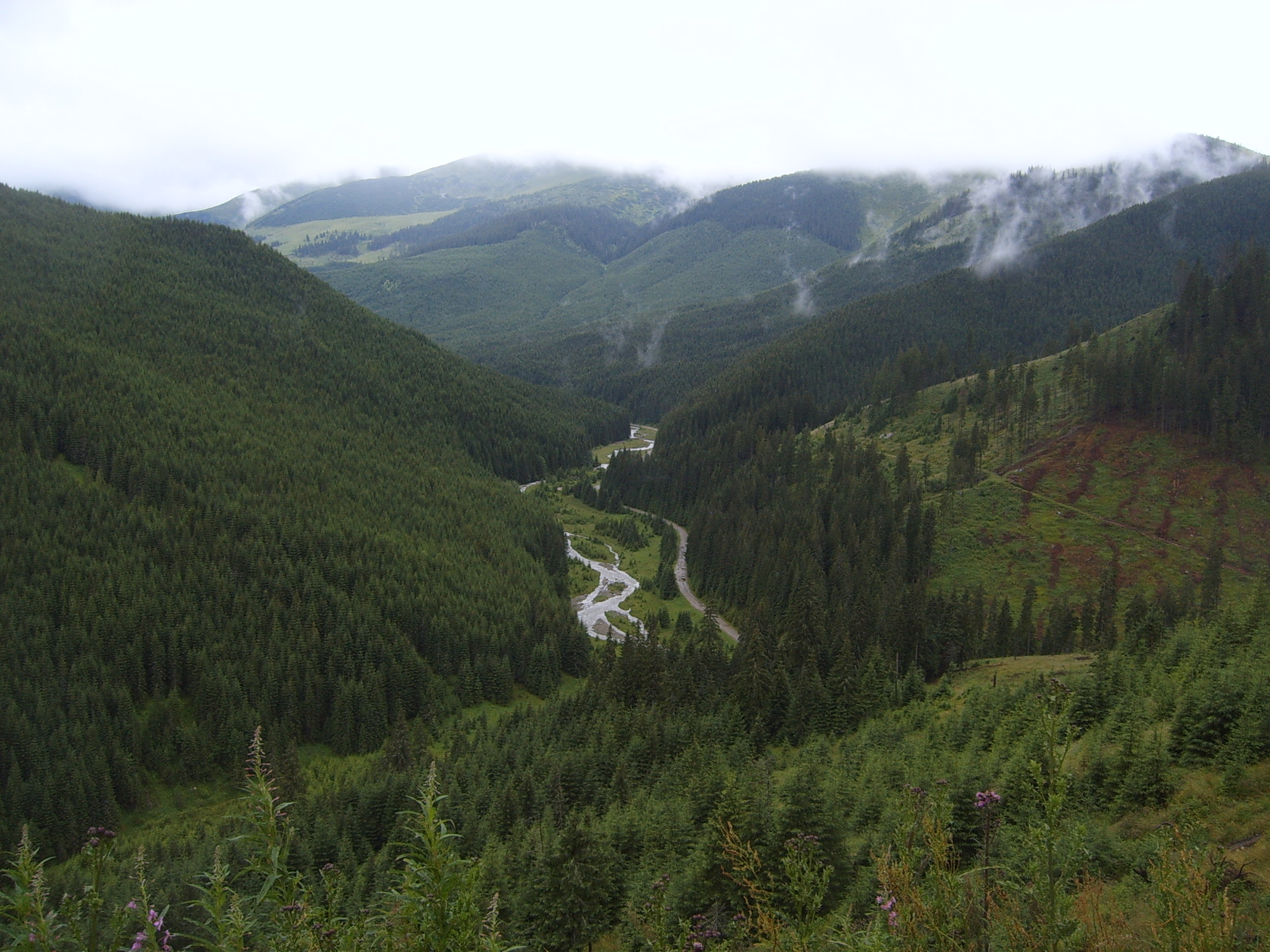
Prislop Pass

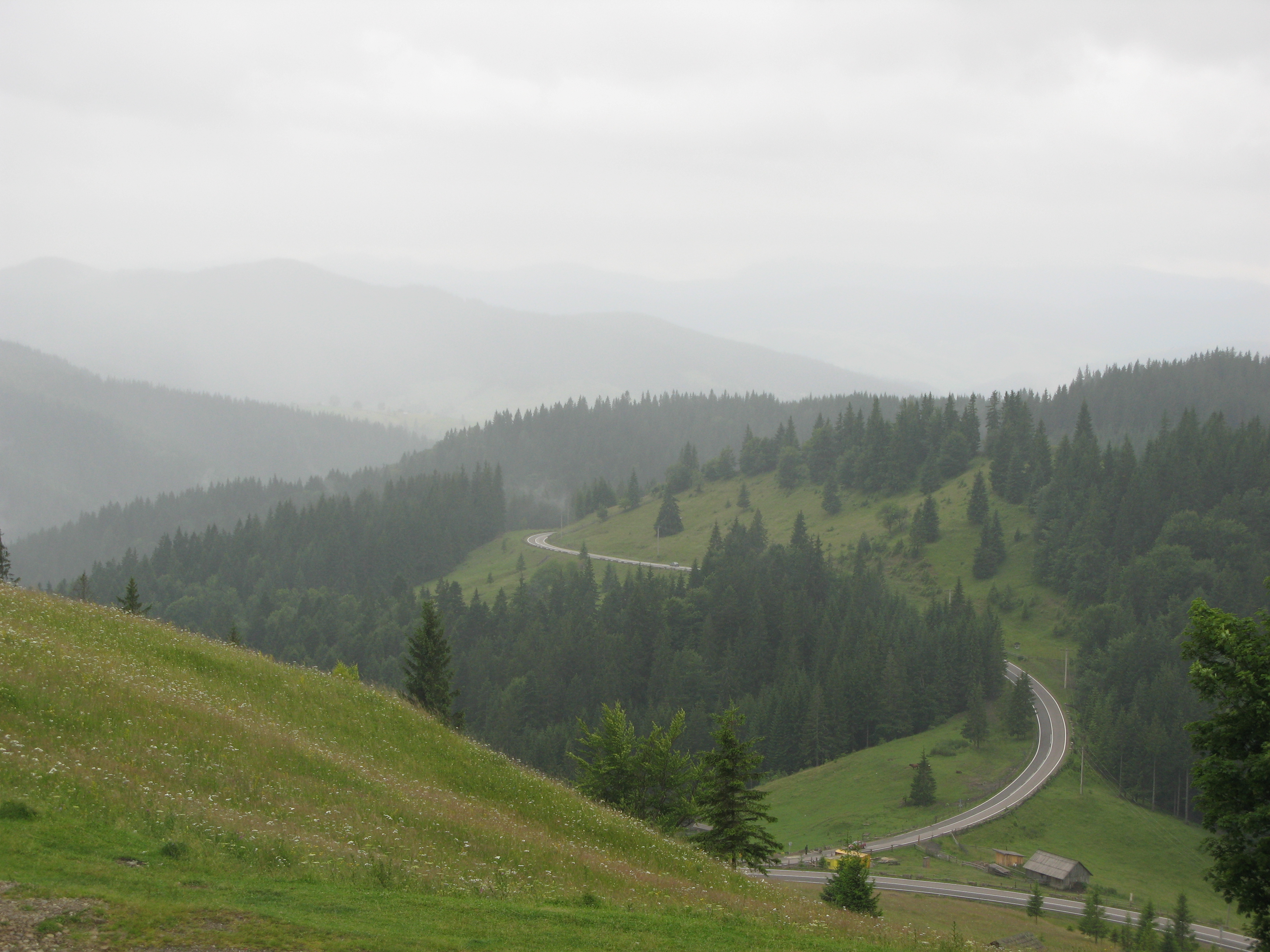
Ciumârna (Palma) Pass

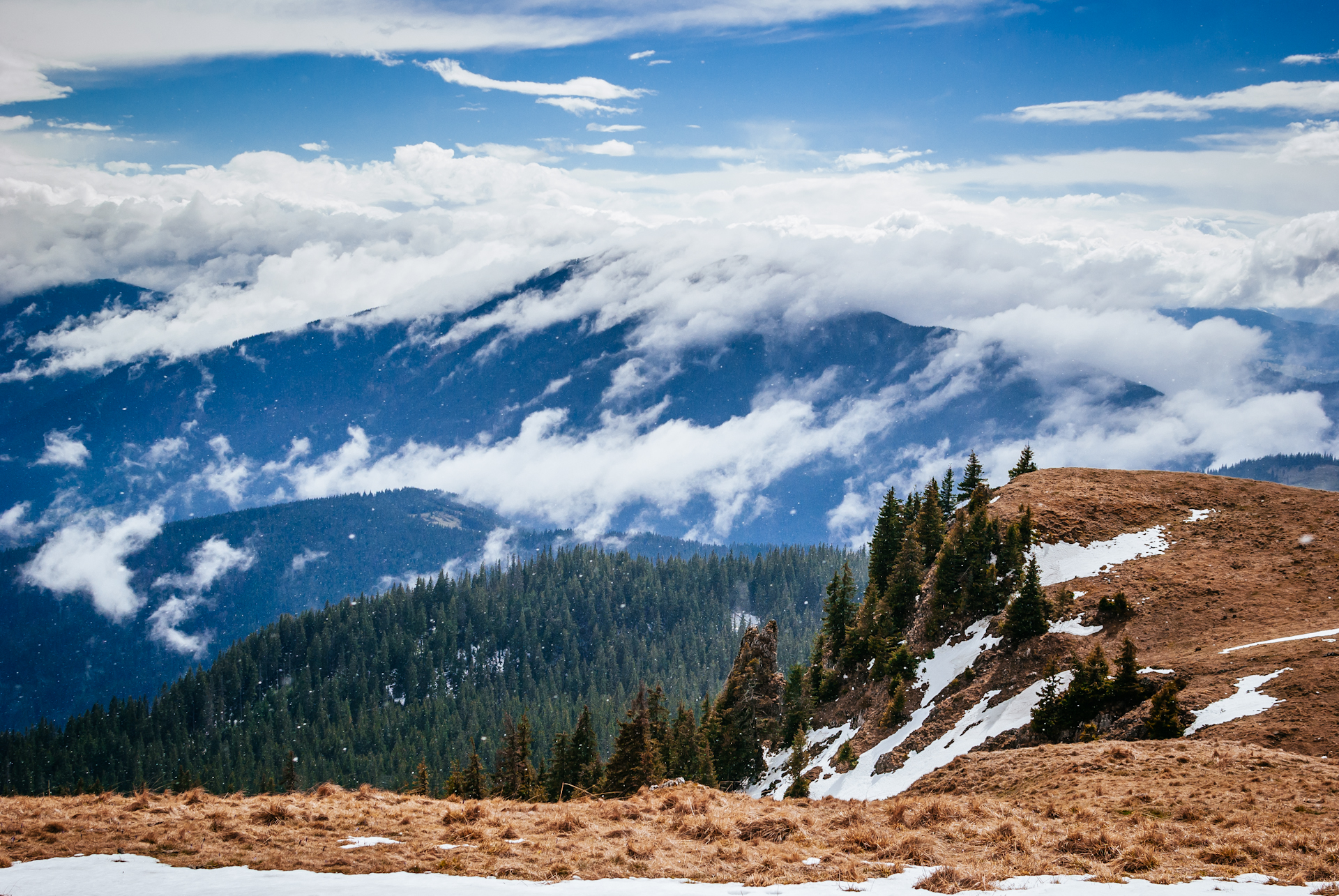
Pietrosul Bistriței peak, Bistrița Mountains (1791 m)

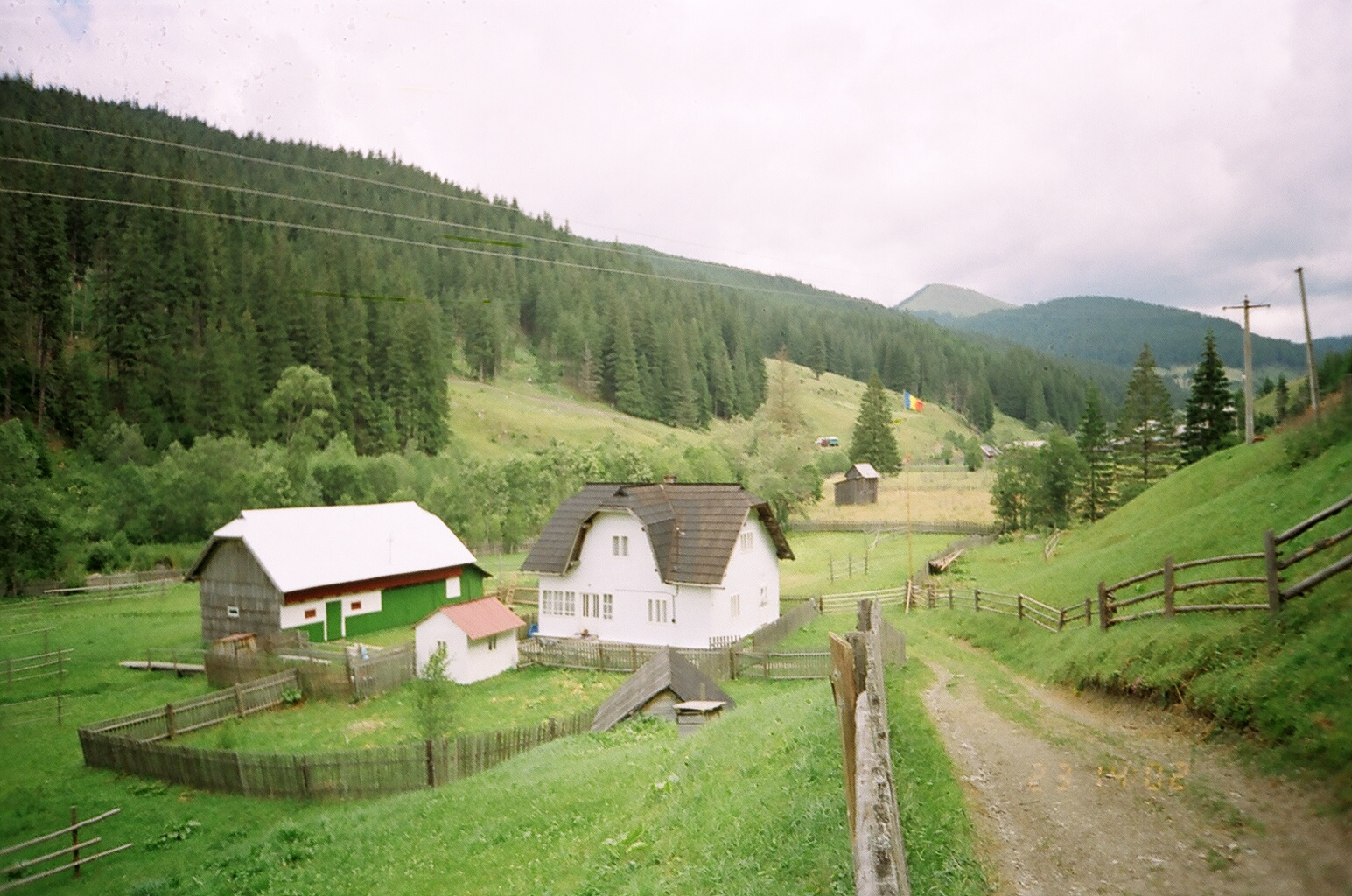
Traditional Romanian inn by a countryside road

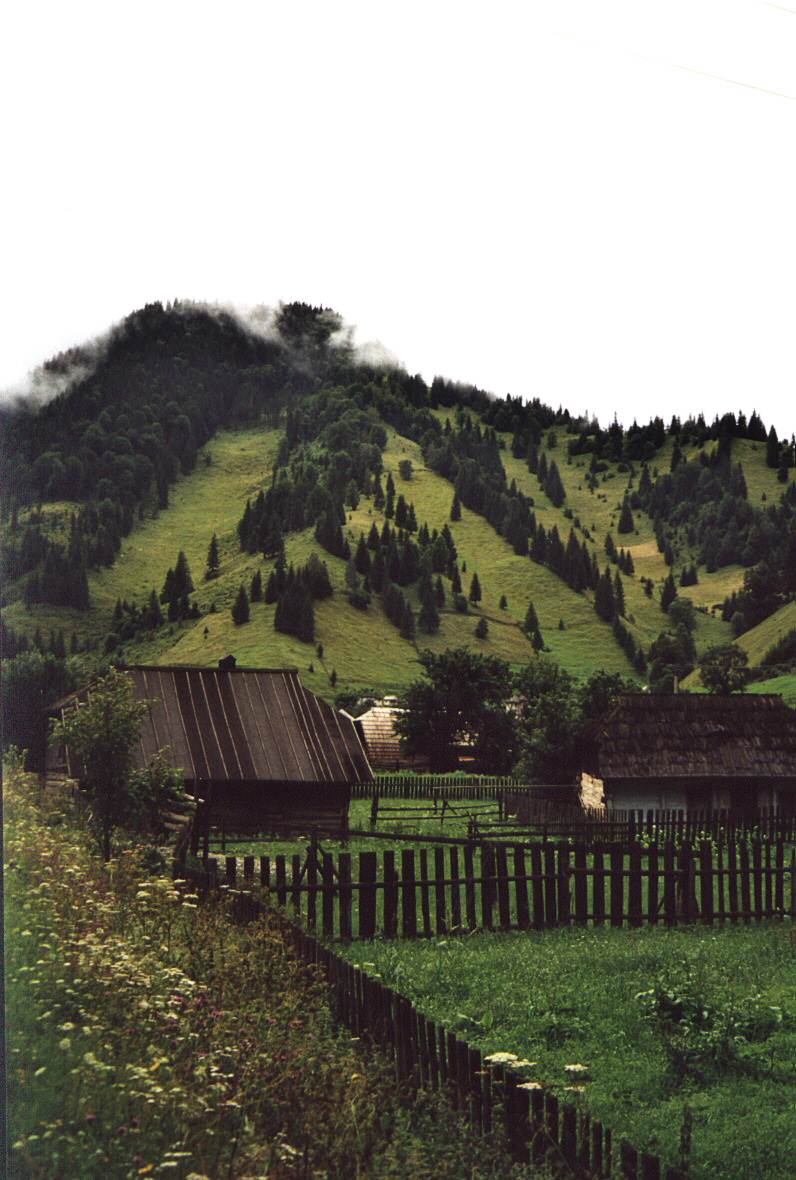
Hills covered in fog in the countryside

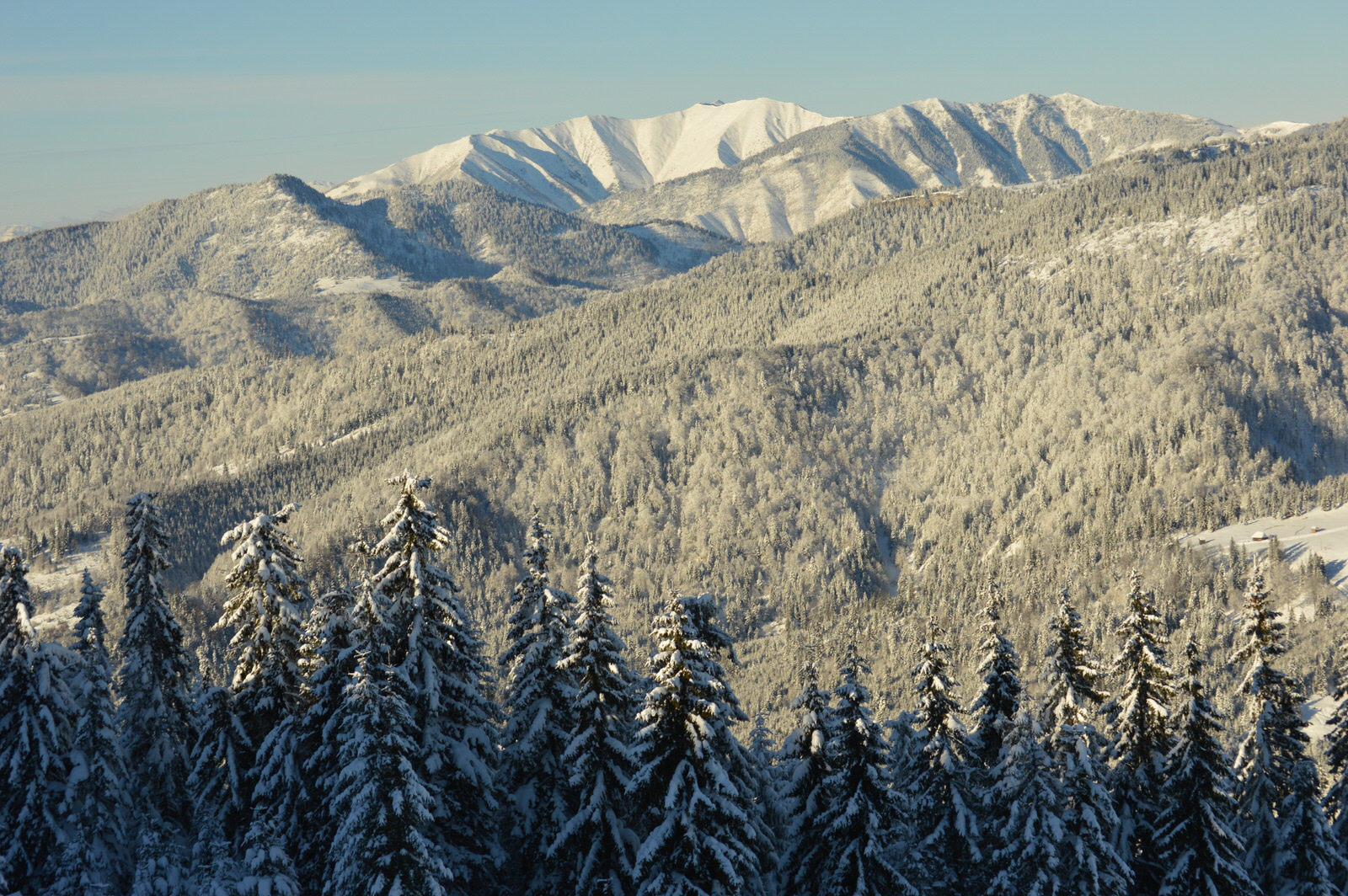
Part of the forested Carpathian Mountains near Ciocănești

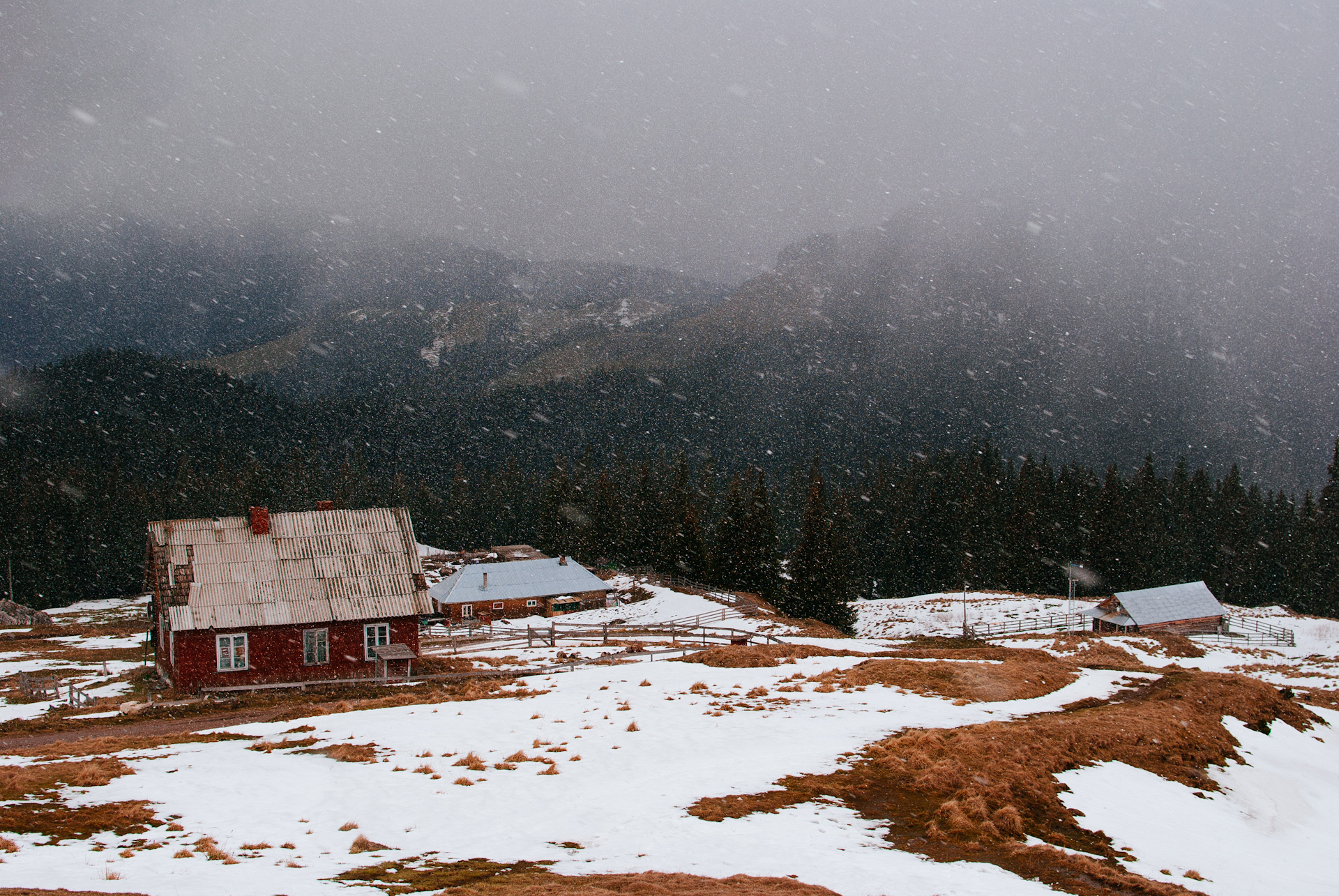
Crucea Commune

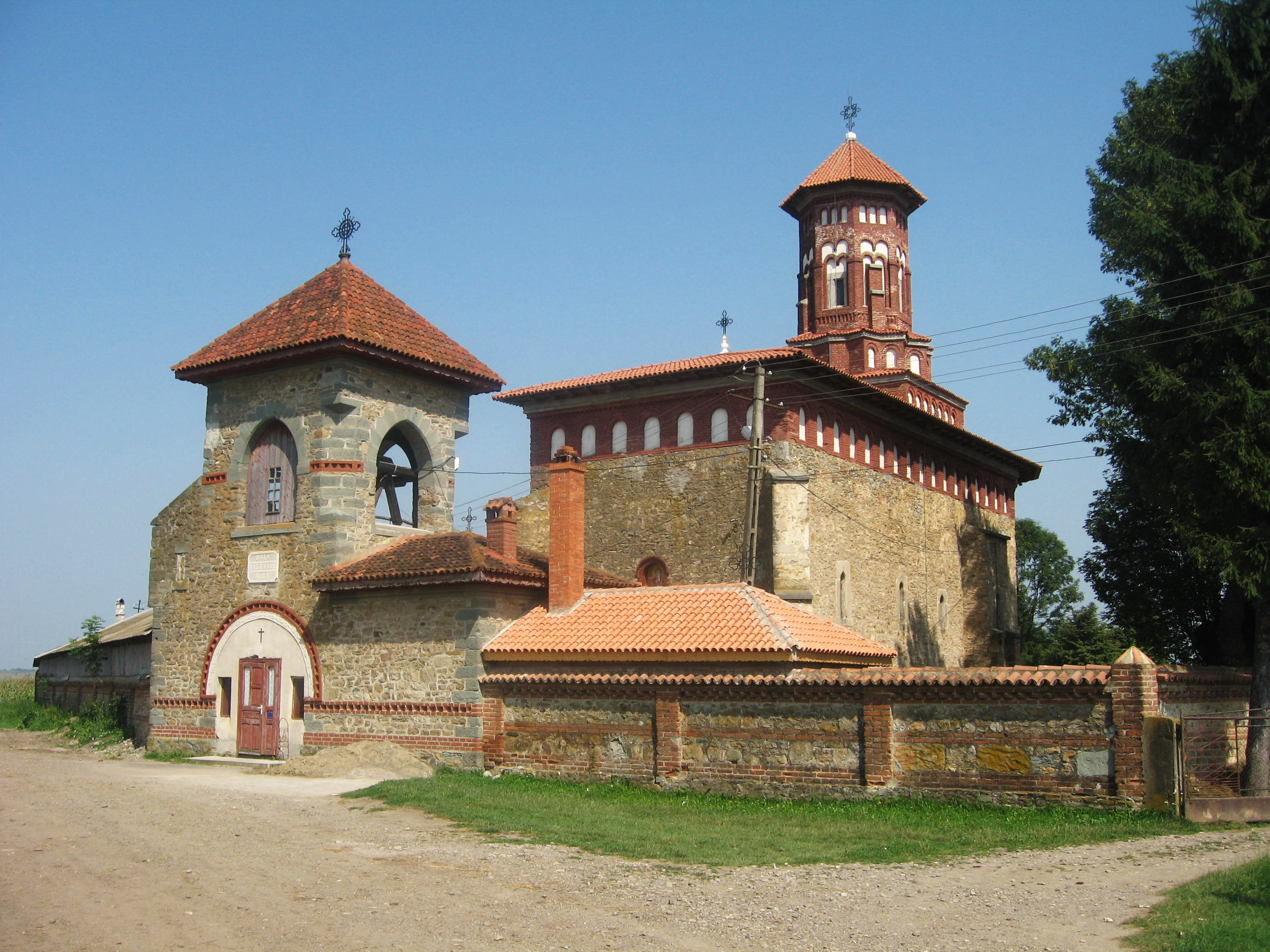
Romanian Orthodox white church in Baia (German: Baja, Stadt Molde, or Moldenmarkt)

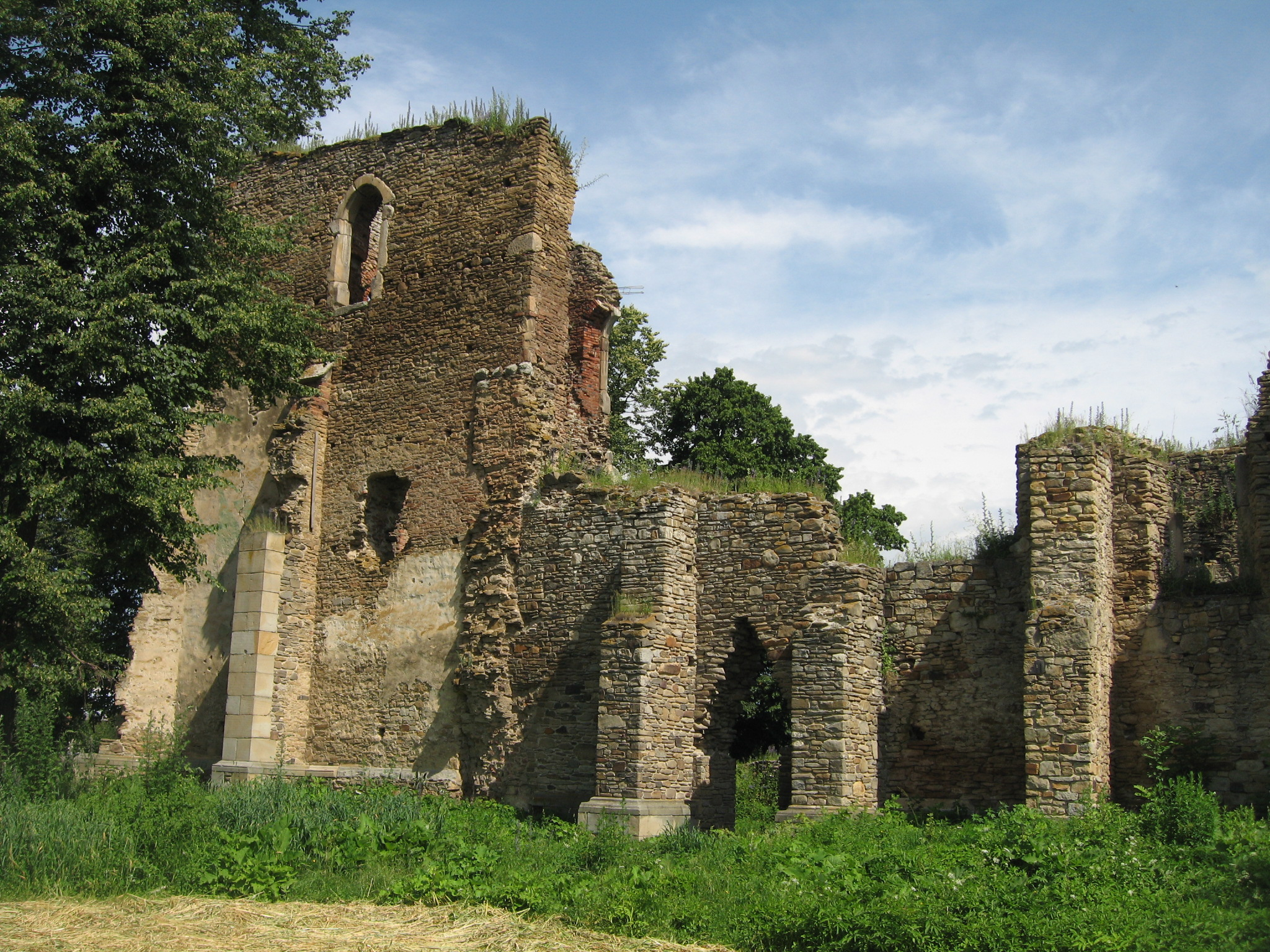
15th century Roman Catholic cathedral ruins built by the Transylvanian Saxons in Baia (German: Baja, Stadt Molde, or Moldenmarkt)

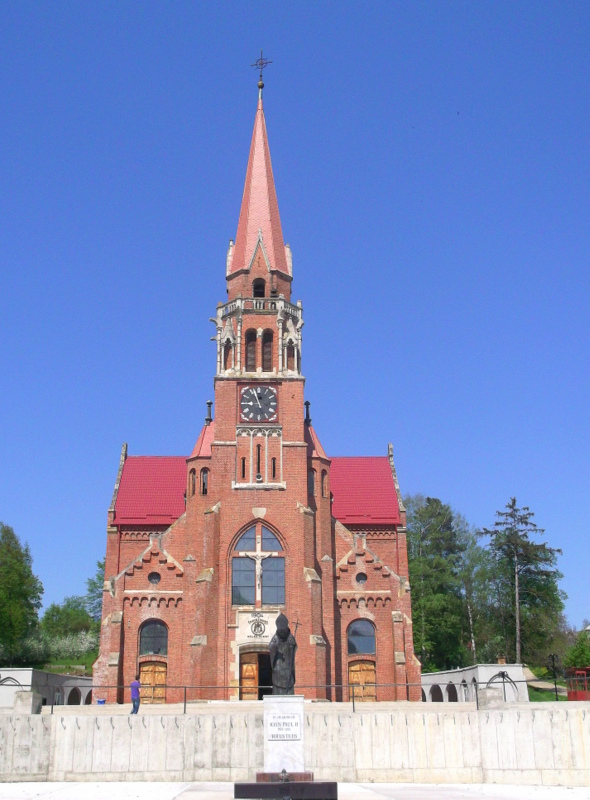
Cacica (Polish: Kaczyka)

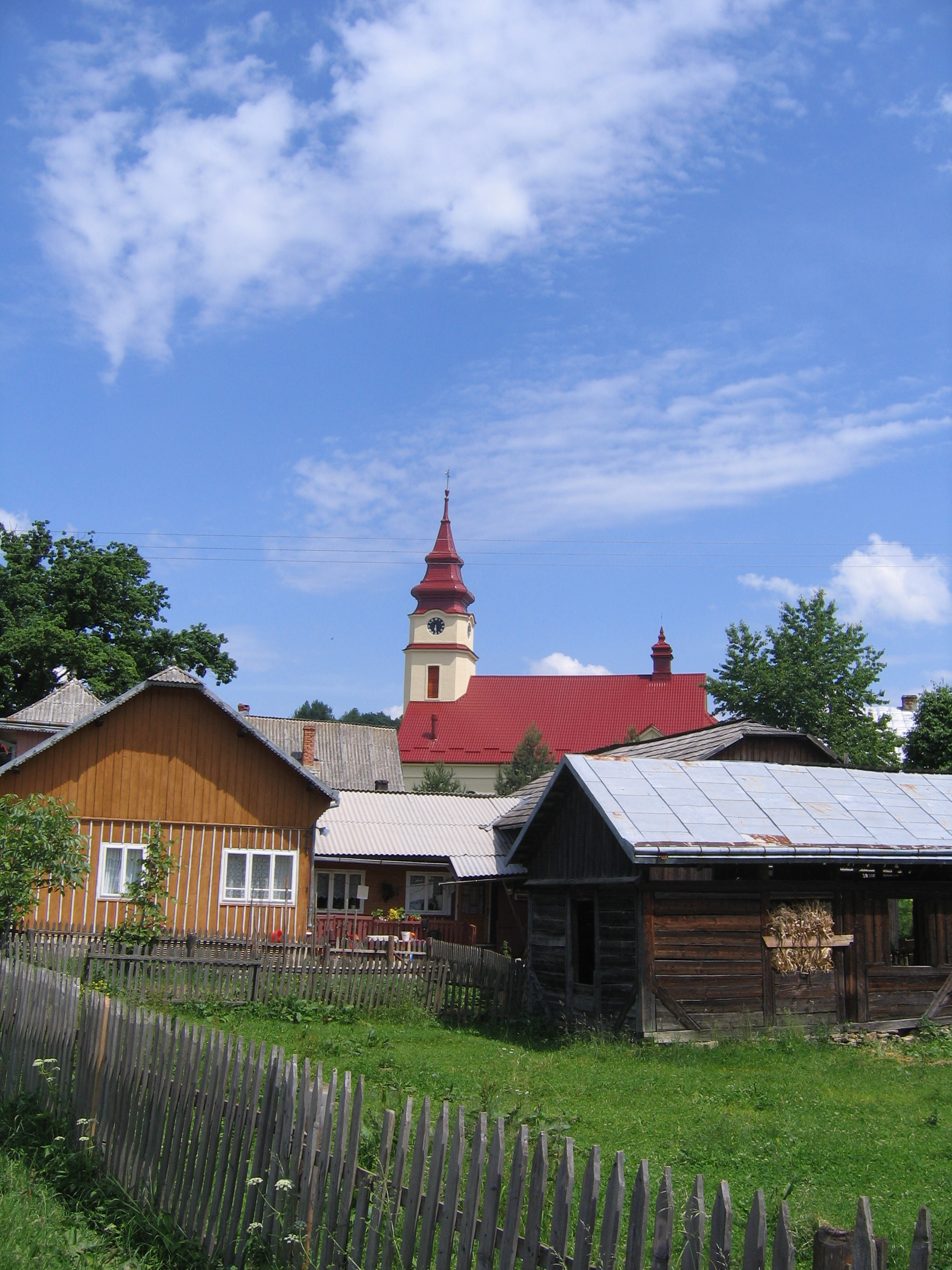
Solonețu Nou (Polish: Nowy Sołoniec) village

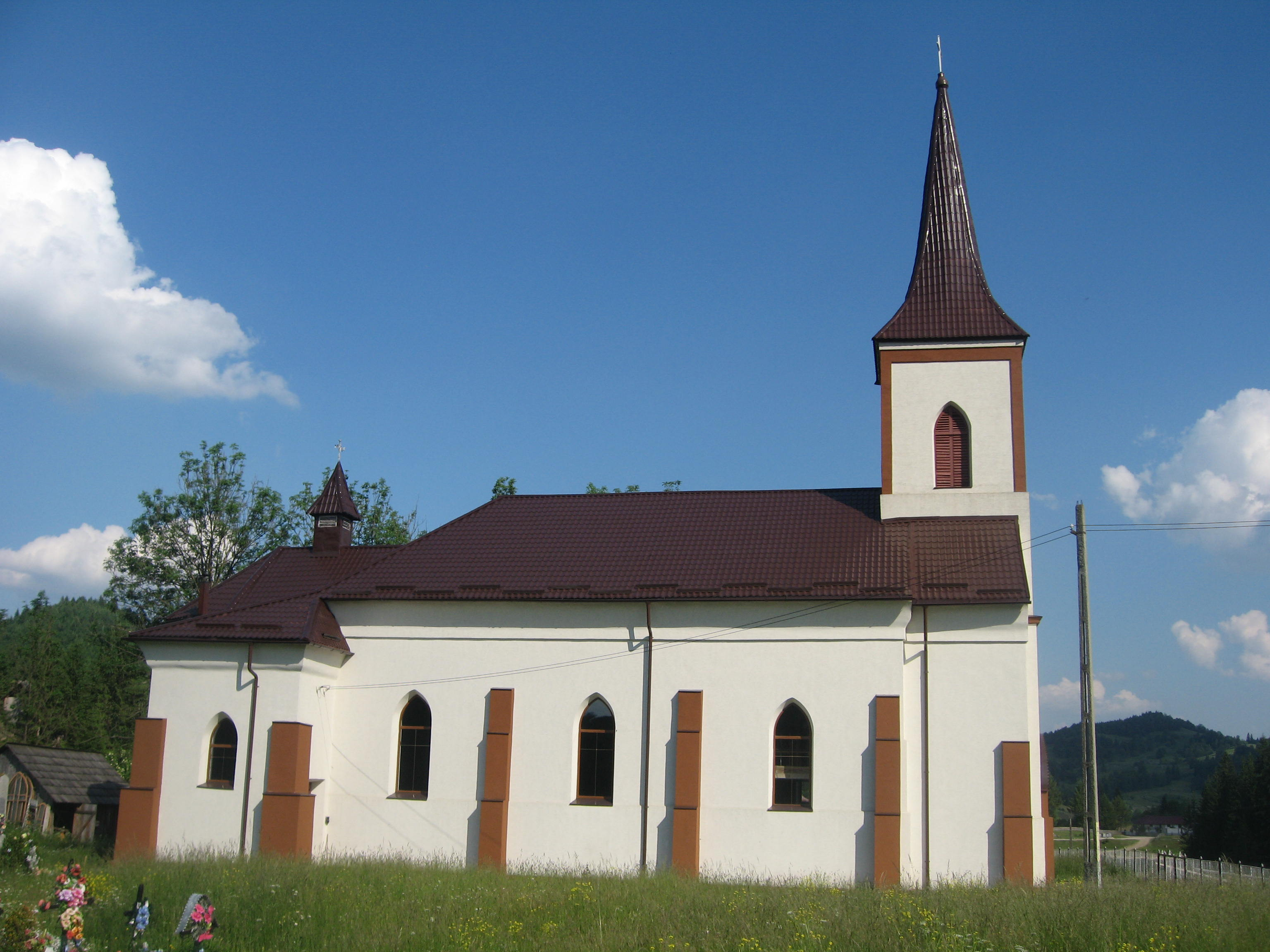
Poiana Micului (Polish: Pojana Mikuli)

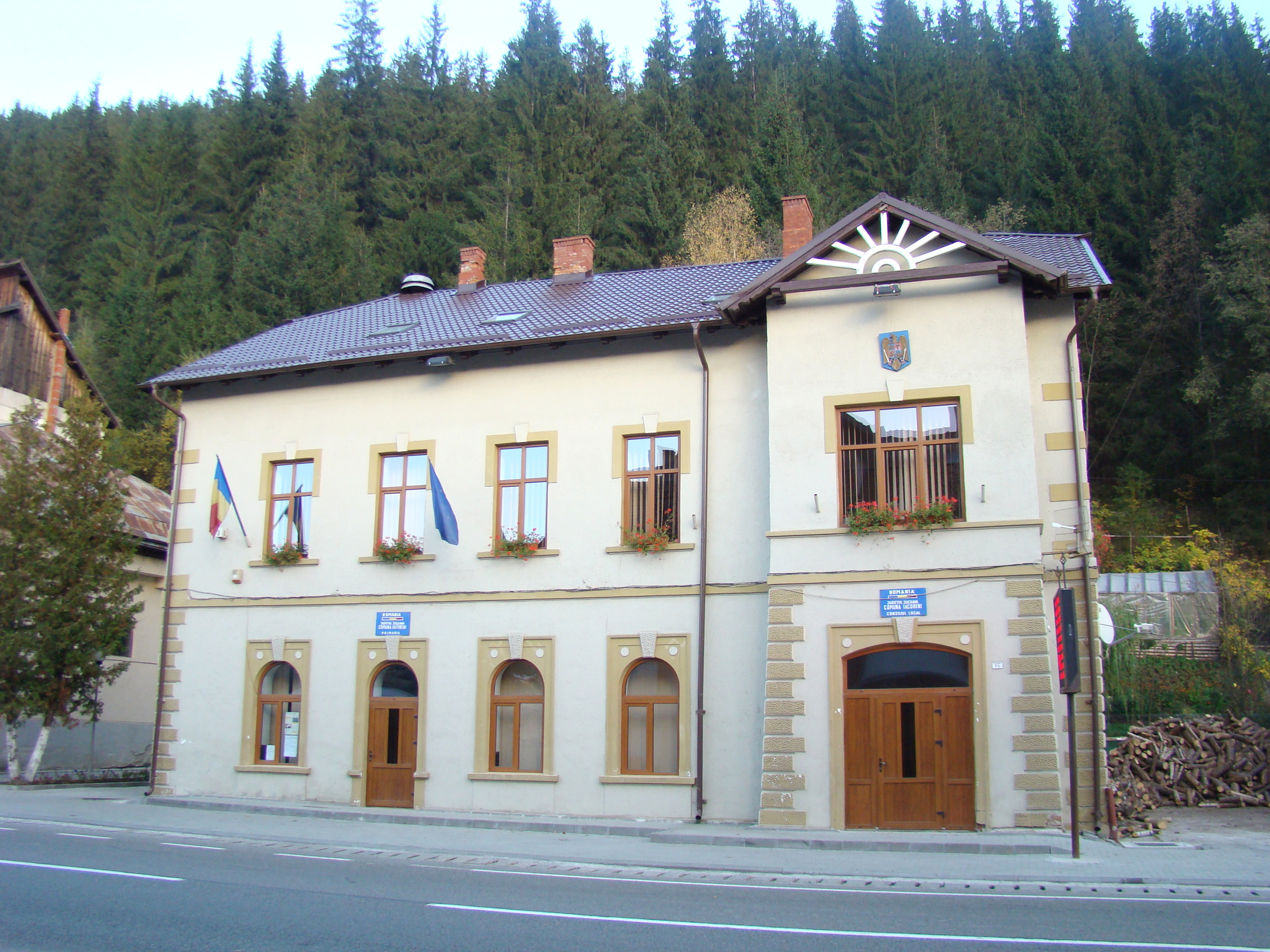
The town hall of Iacobeni (German: Jakobeny)

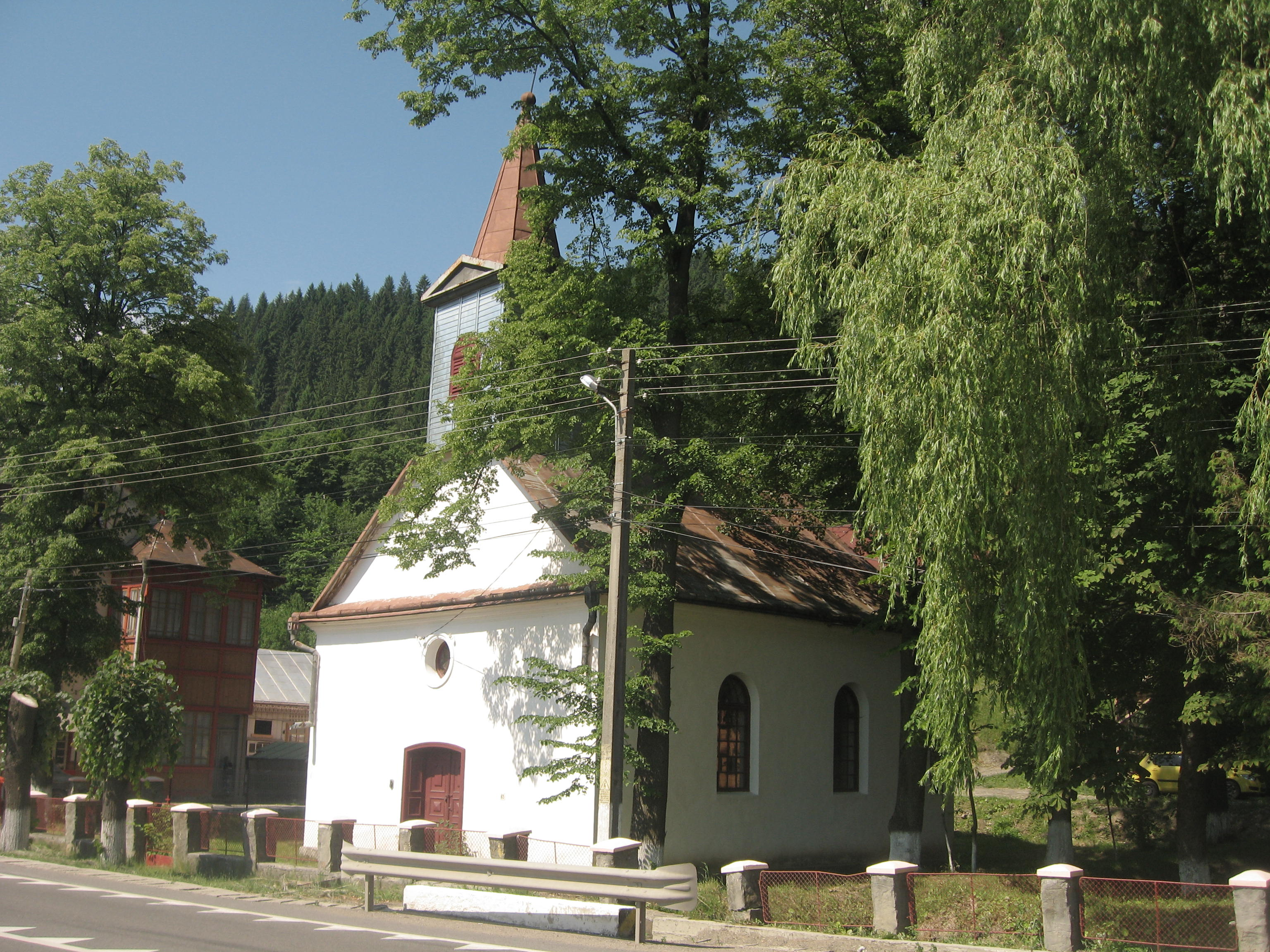
Prisaca Dornei (German: Eisenau)

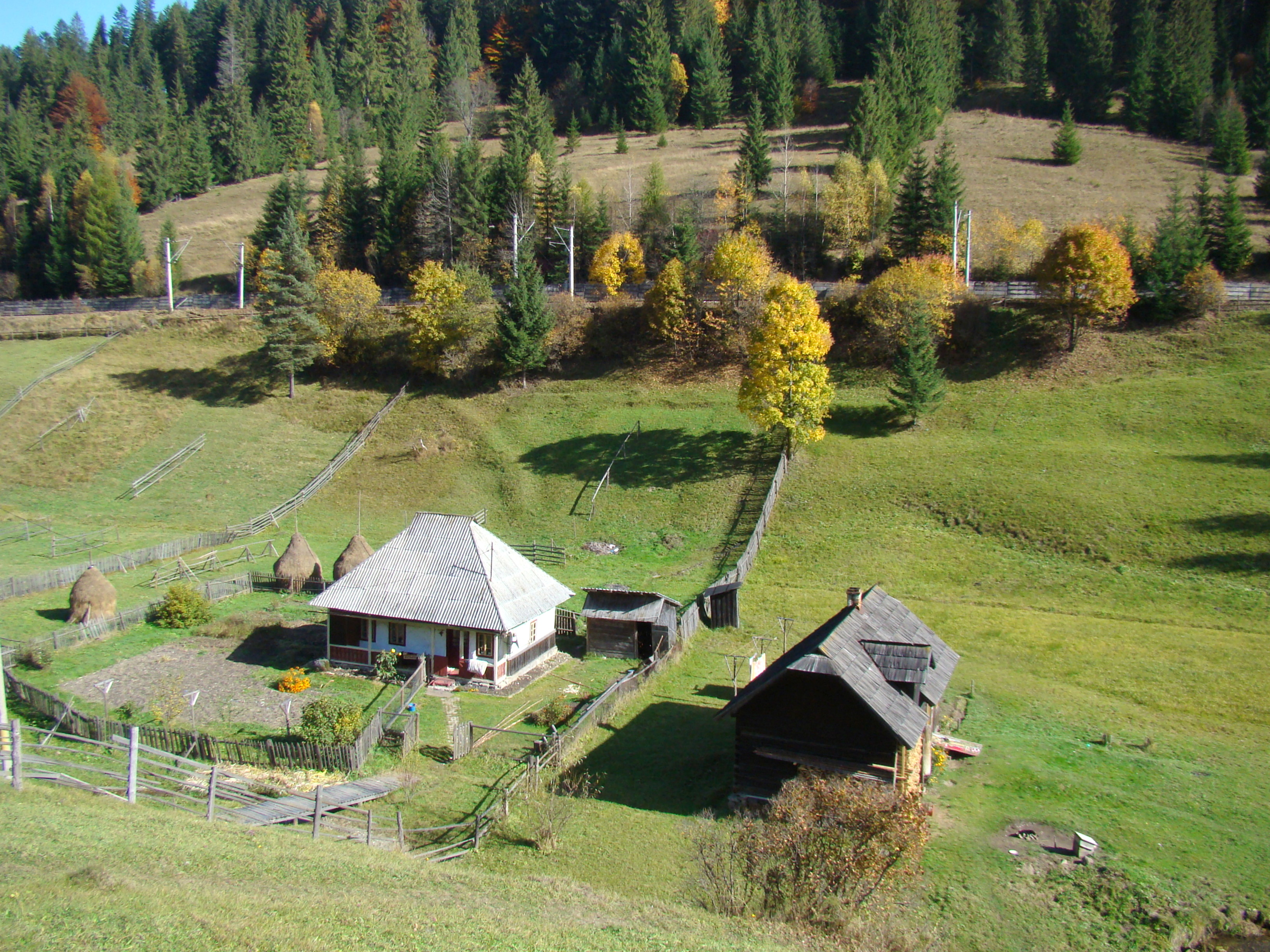
Valea Putnei (German: Waleputna)

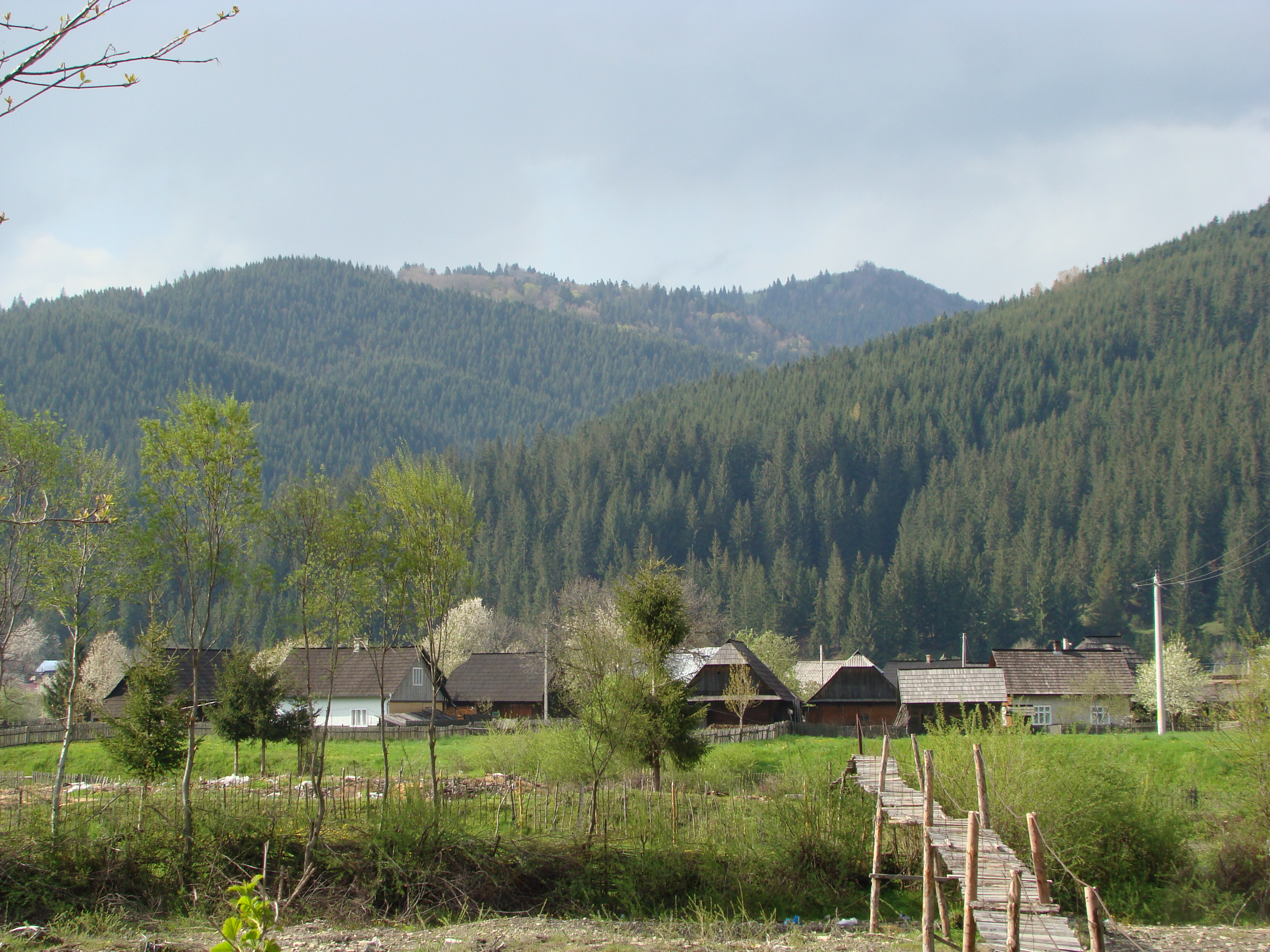
Straja (German: Strasza)

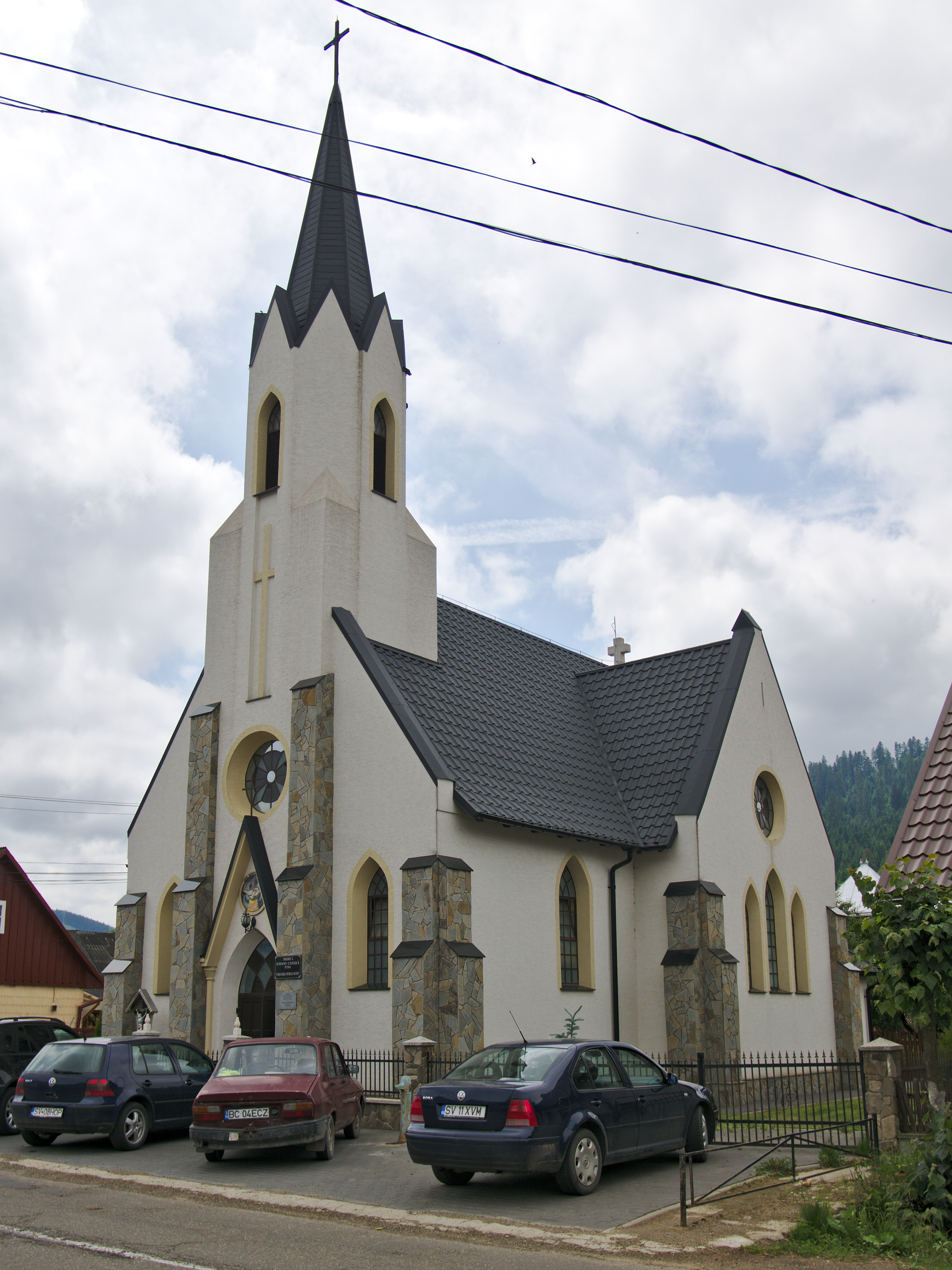
Roman Catholic church in Gura Putnei (German: Karlsberg)

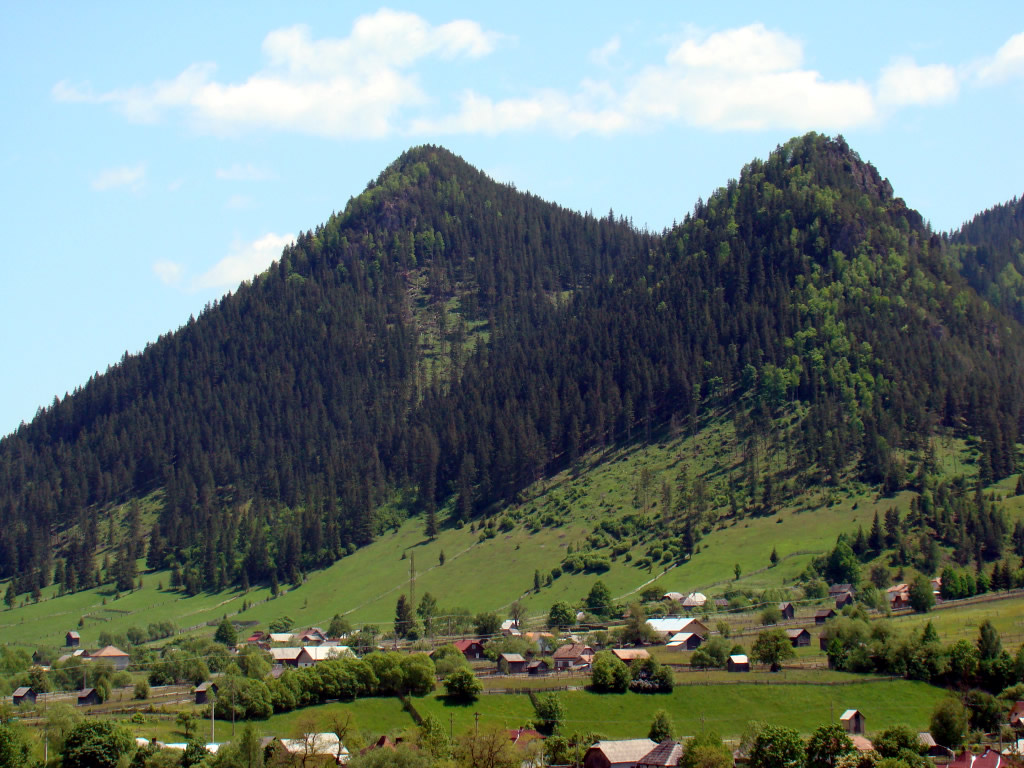
Mountainous landscape near Câmpulung Moldovenesc

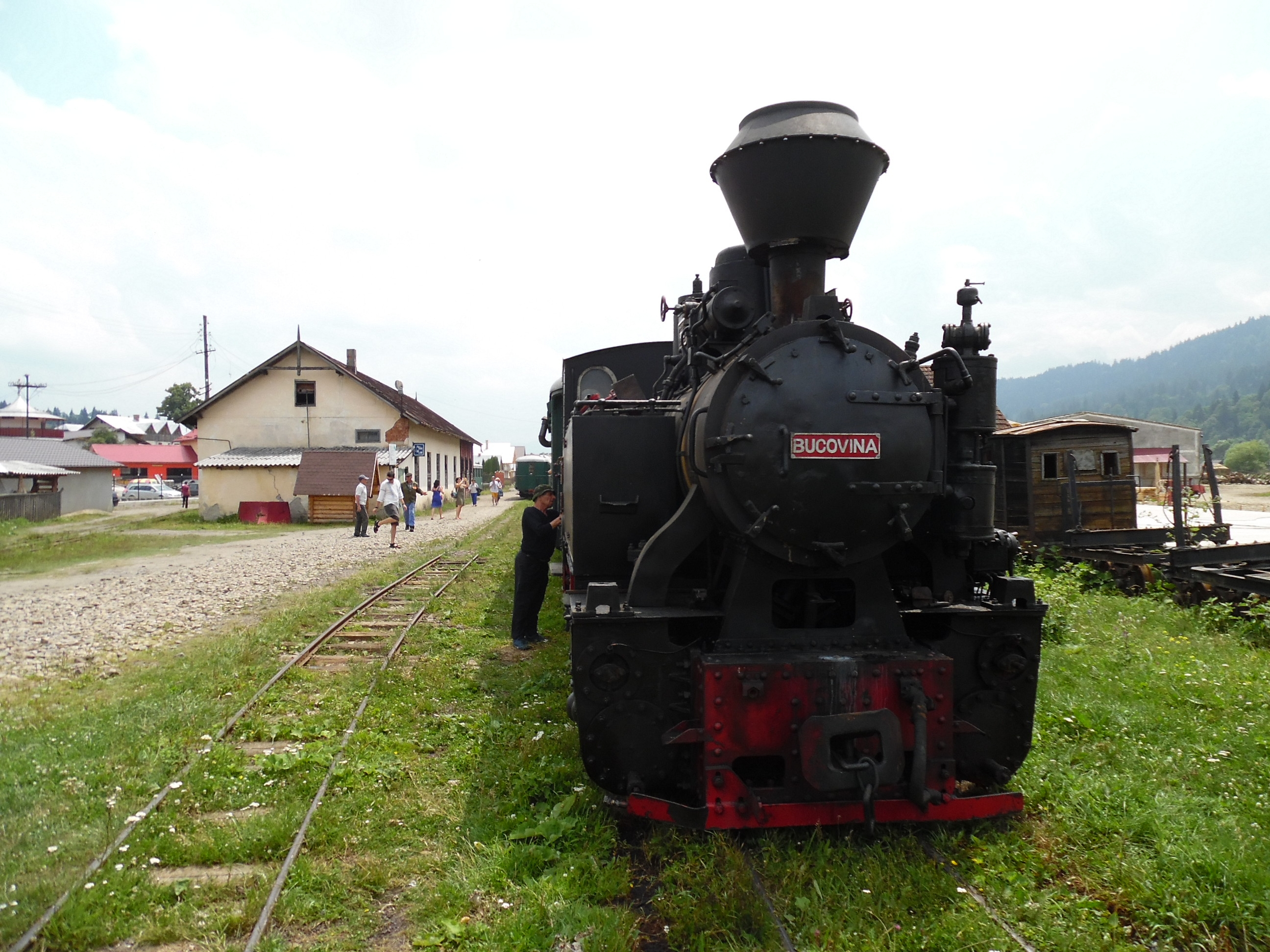
Mocăniță narrow-gauge railway steam train

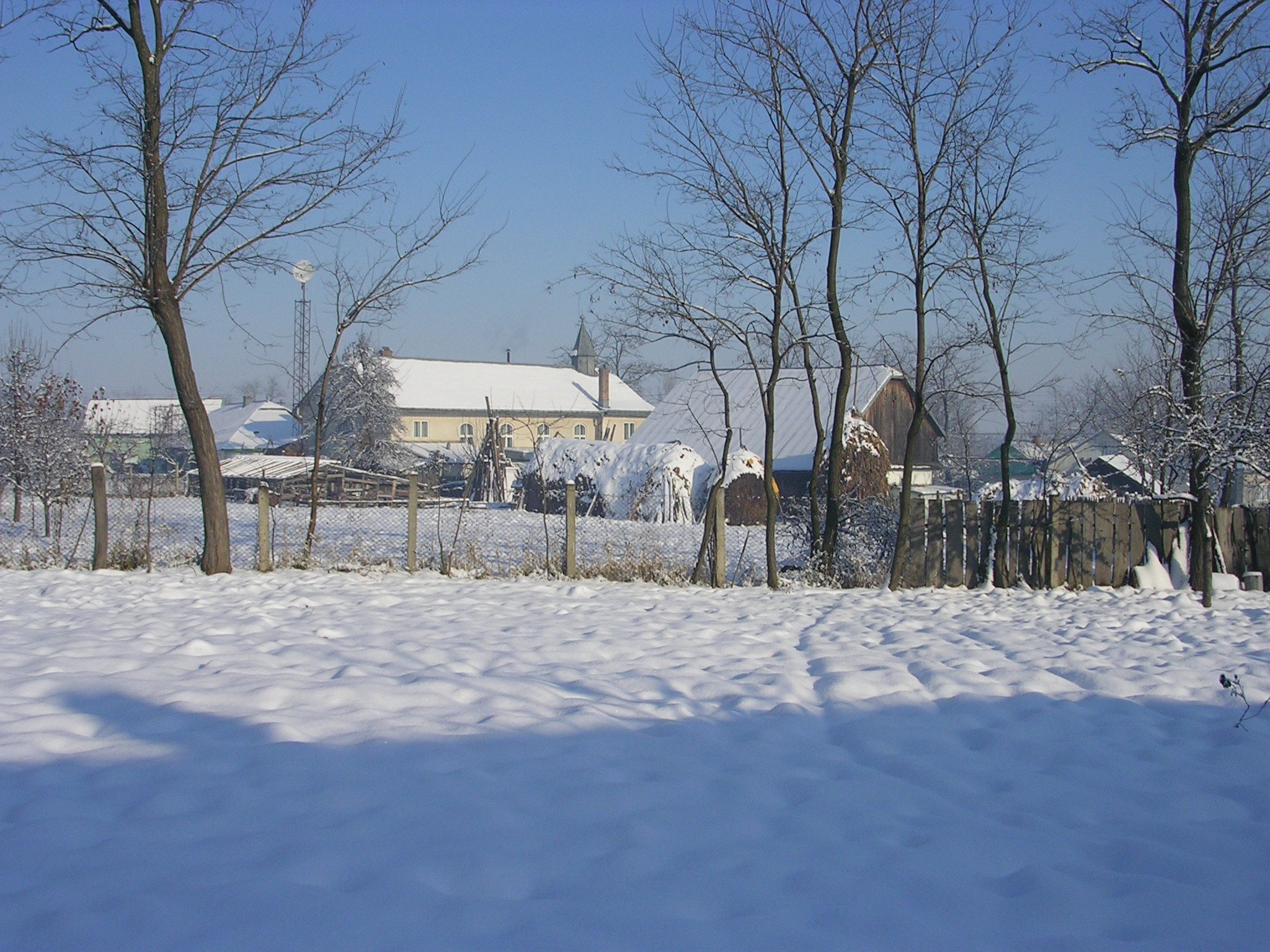
Dumrăveni

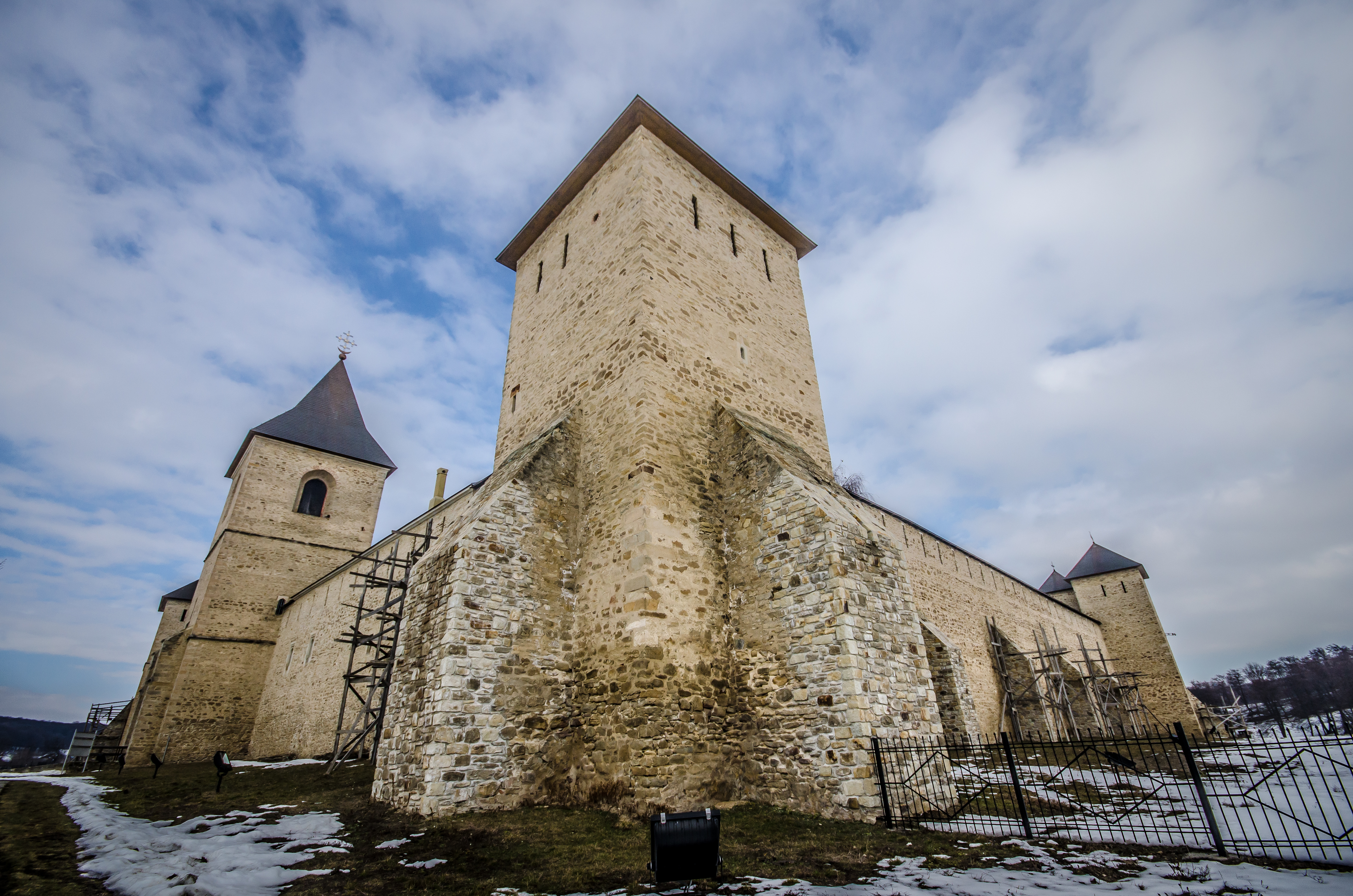
Mitocu Dragomirnei (German: Mitoka Dragomirna)

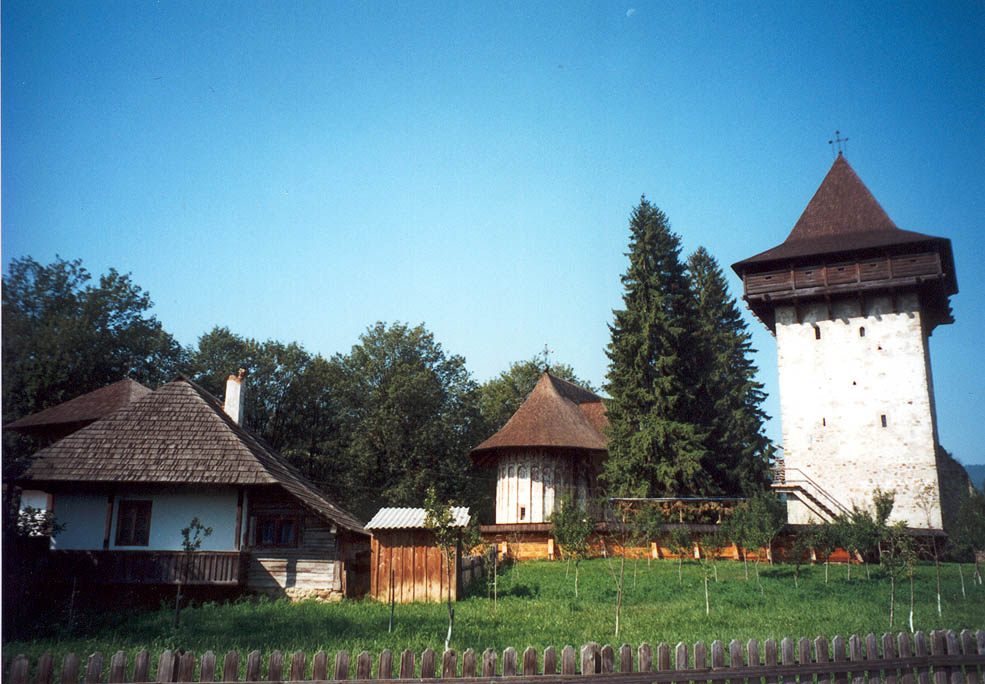
Mănăstirea Humorului (German: Humora Kloster)

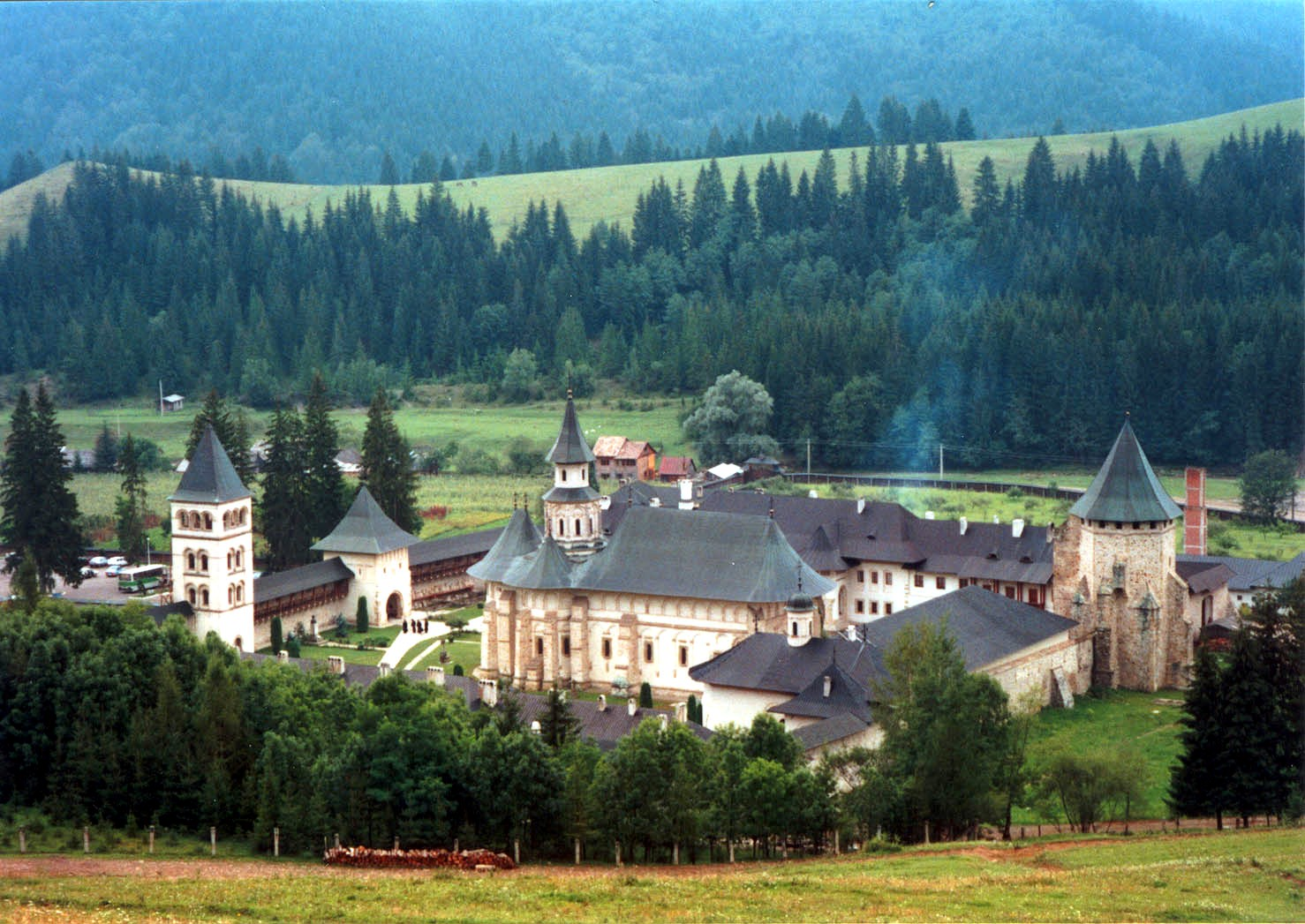
Putna Monastery

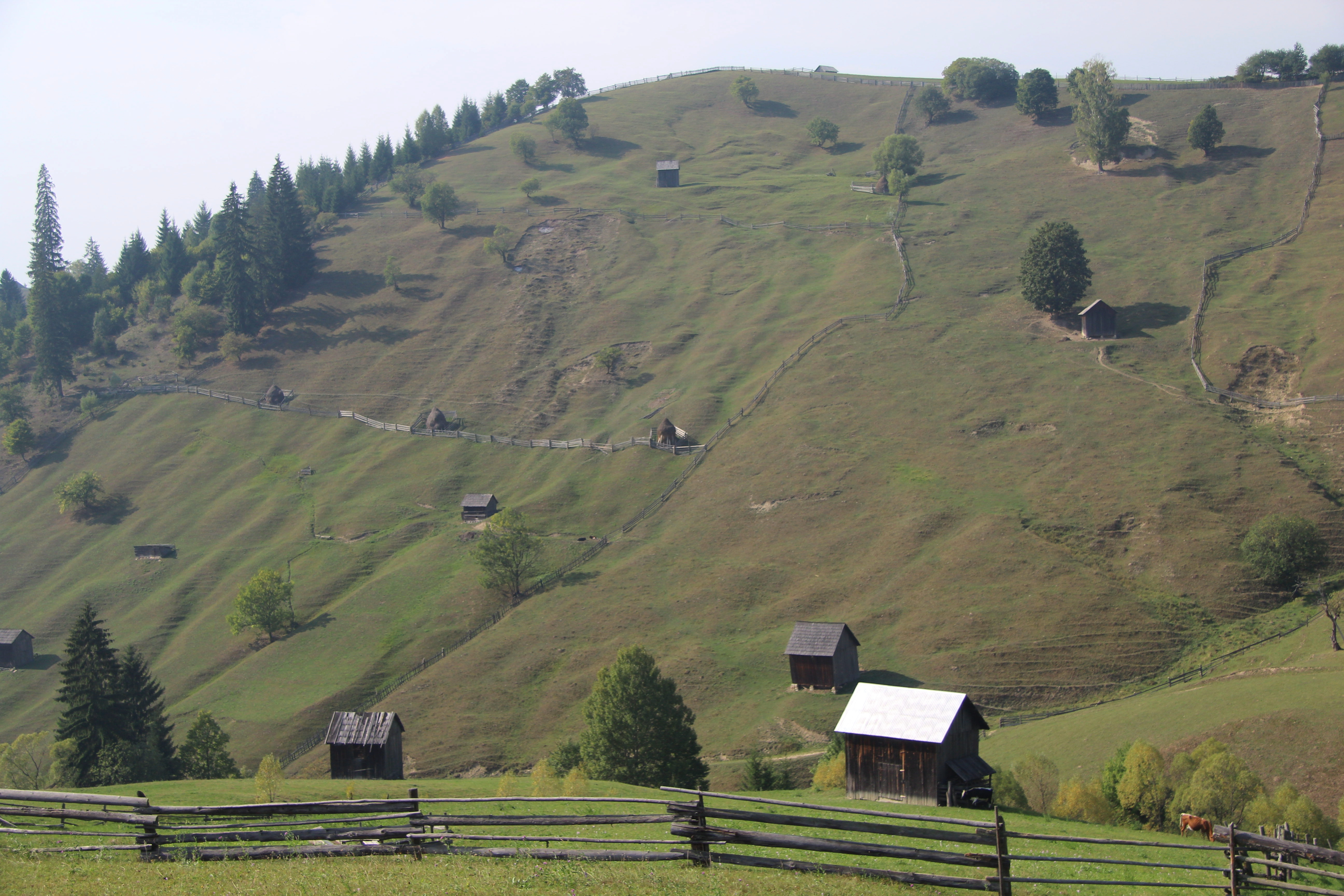
Moldovița (German: Russ Moldawitza)

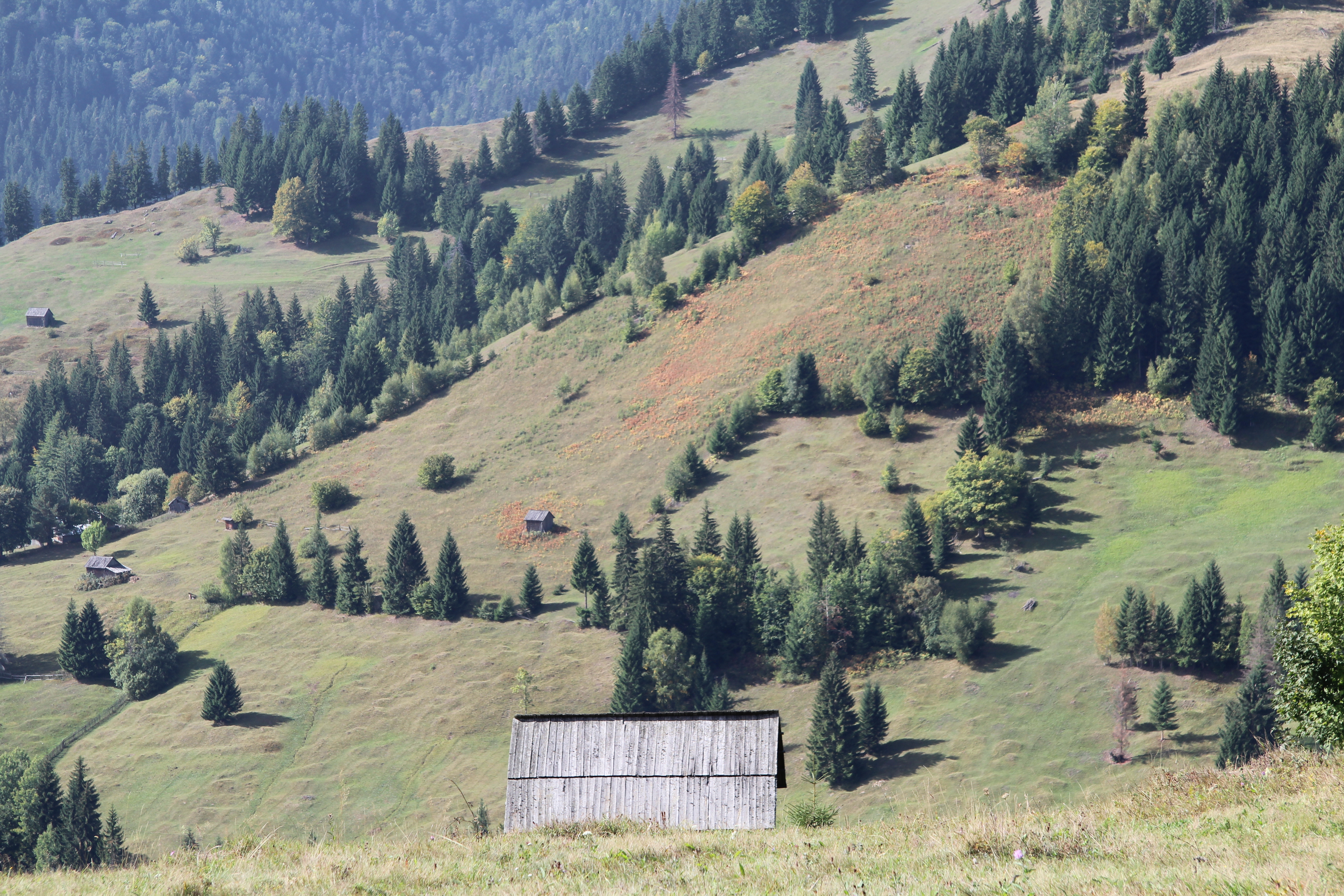
Slătioara secular forest, UNESCO World Heritage Site

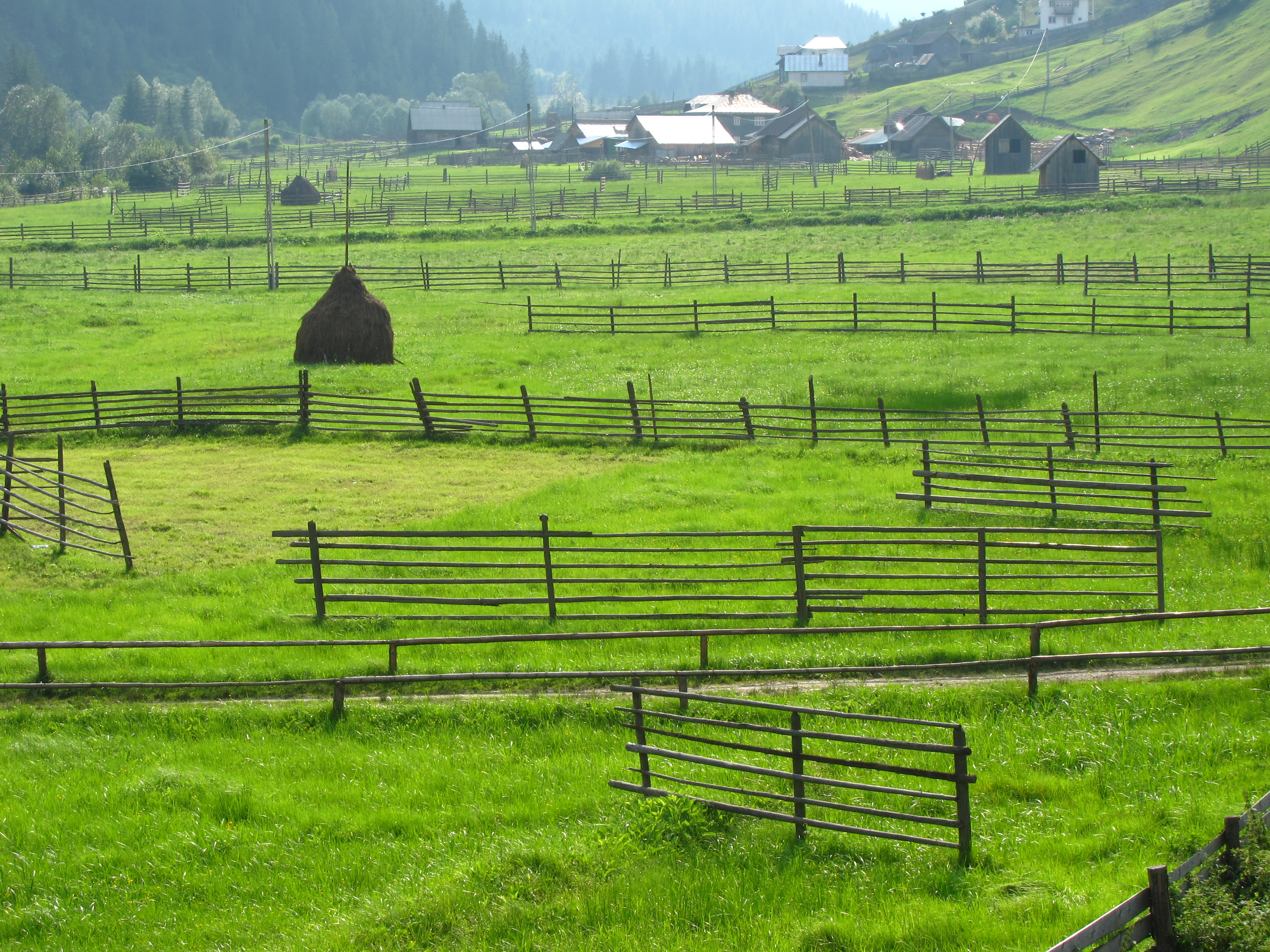
Meadows in Panaci

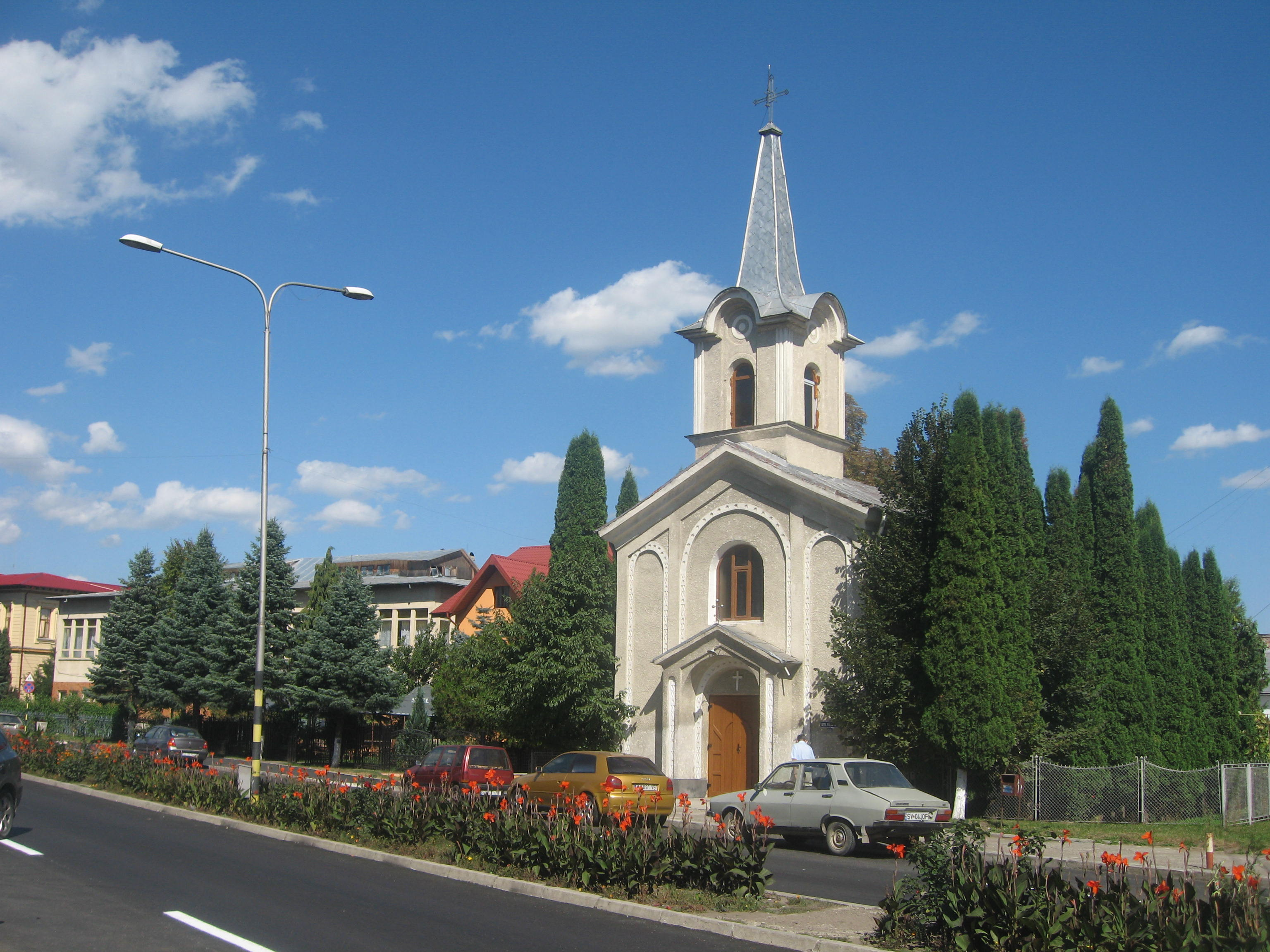
Downtown Fălticeni (German: Foltischeni)

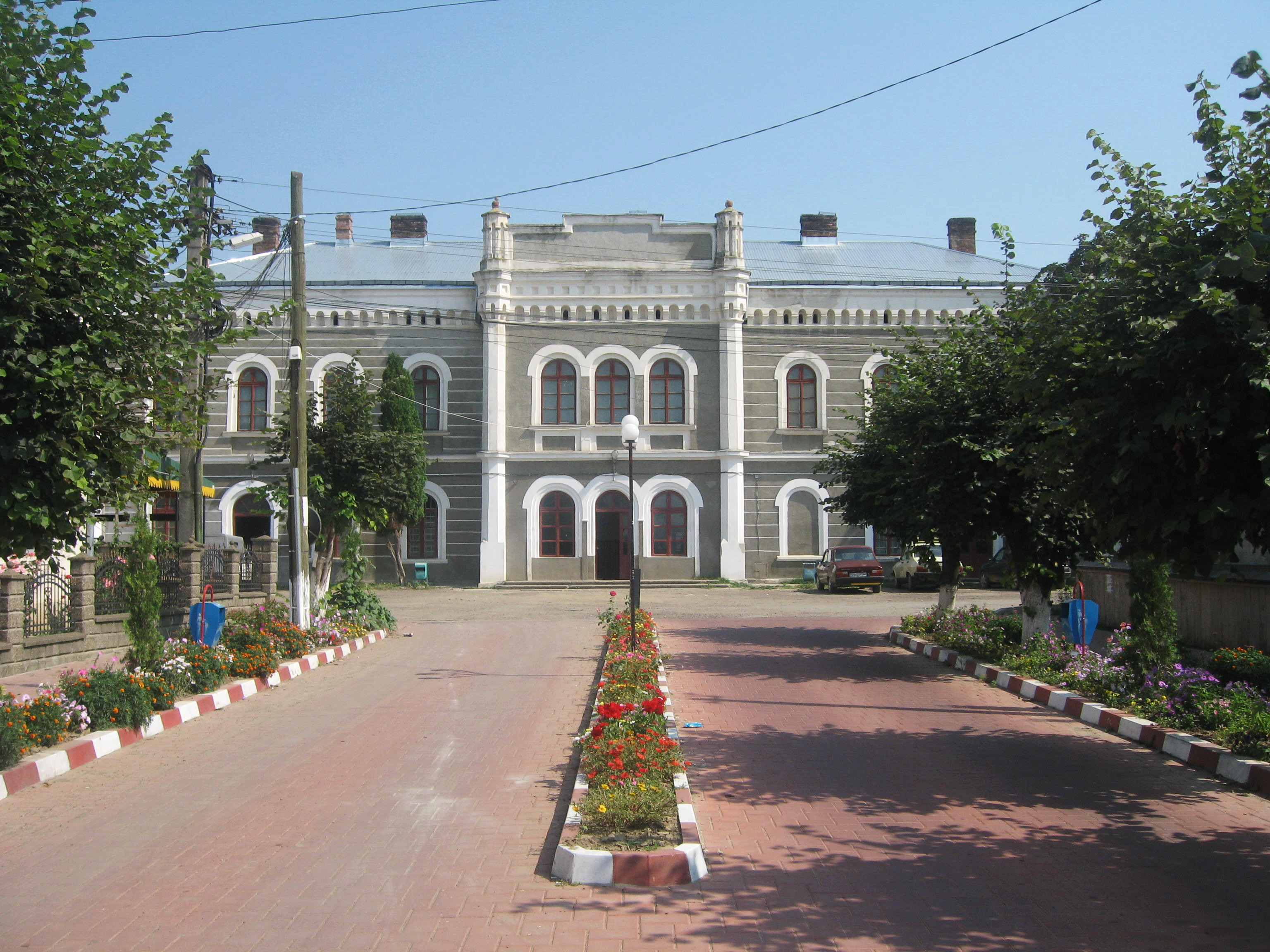
Verești

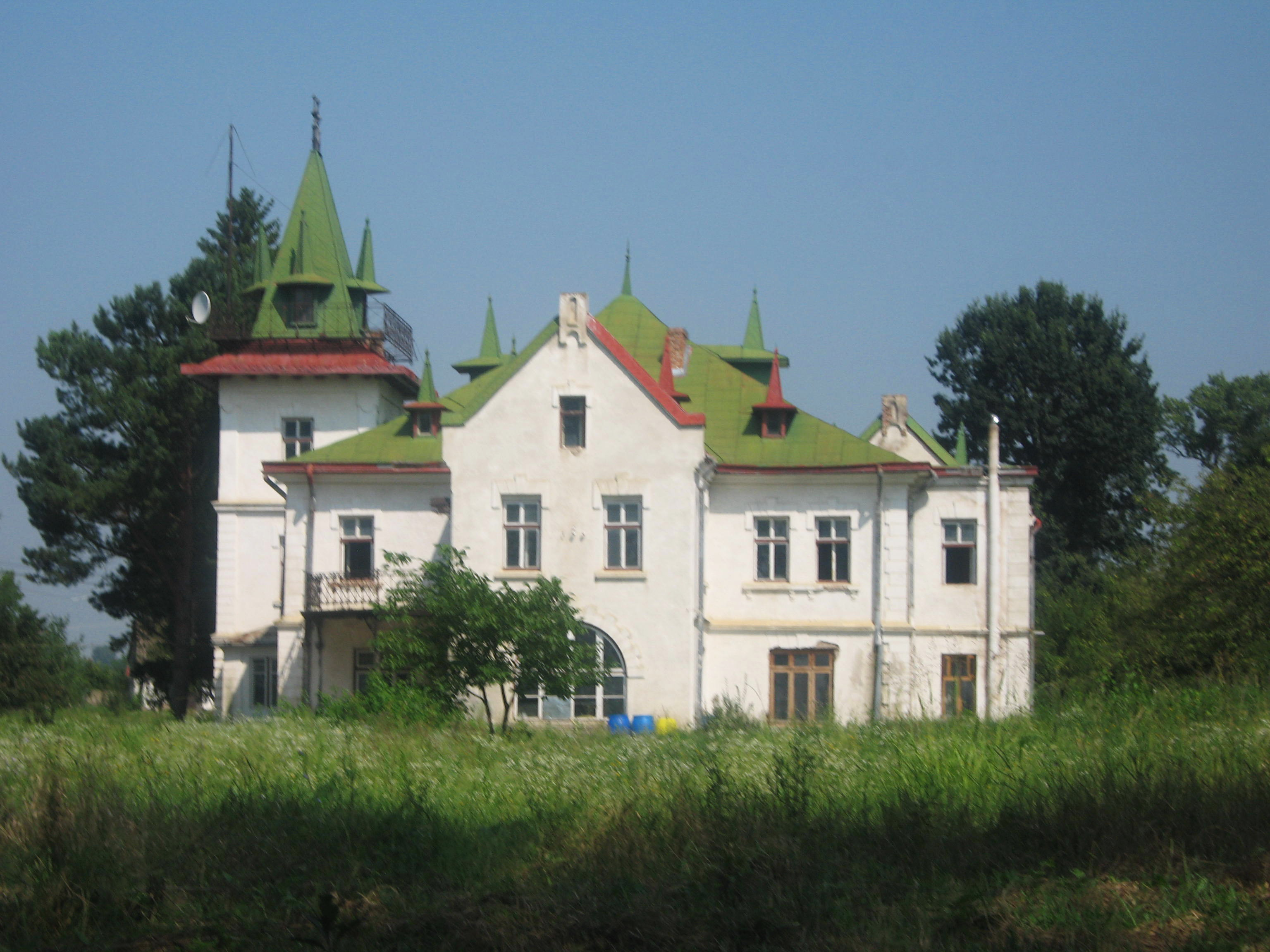
Sturdza manor in Salcea

== Notable natives and residents ==
- Anca Parghel – Romanian-Romani musician and jazz singer
- Matei Vișniec – Romanian-French playwright
- Nichita Danilov – Lipovan poet
- Iulian Vesper – Romanian poet and writer
- Nicolae Labiș – Romanian poet
- Grigore Vasiliu Birlic – Romanian actor
- Ion G. Sbiera – Romanian folklorist
- Ion Costist – Romanian 16th century Roman Catholic monk
- Liviu Giosan – Romanian-American marine geologist
- Elisabeta Lipă – Romanian Olympic rower
- Dorin Goian – Romanian football player
- Constantin Schumacher – Romanian-German footballer
- Józef Weber – German Roman Catholic archbishop
- Elisabeth Axmann – German writer
- Otto Babiasch – German Olympic boxer
- Lothar Würzel – German linguist, journalist, and politician
- George Ostafi – German abstract painter
- Hugo Weczerka – German historian and academician
- Anton Keschmann – German politician in the Imperial Austrian Parliament
- Olha Kobylianska – Ukrainian-German writer
- Ludwig Adolf Staufe-Simiginowicz – Ukrainian-German writer and educator
- George Löwendal – Romanian painter and stage designer of Danish-Russian origin

== Historical county ==
Județul Suceava
- County (Județ)
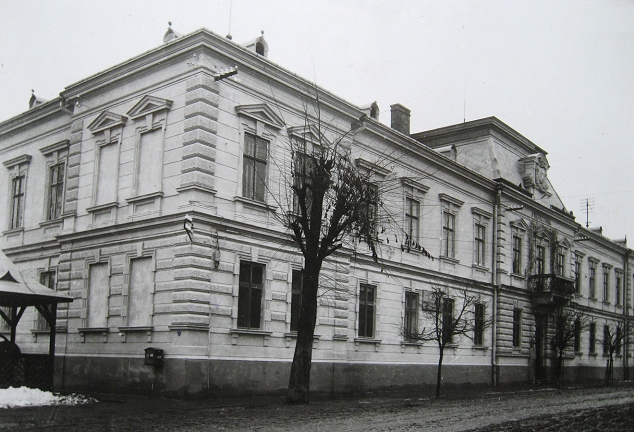
- The Suceava County Prefecture building from the interwar period (now the History Museum in Suceava)

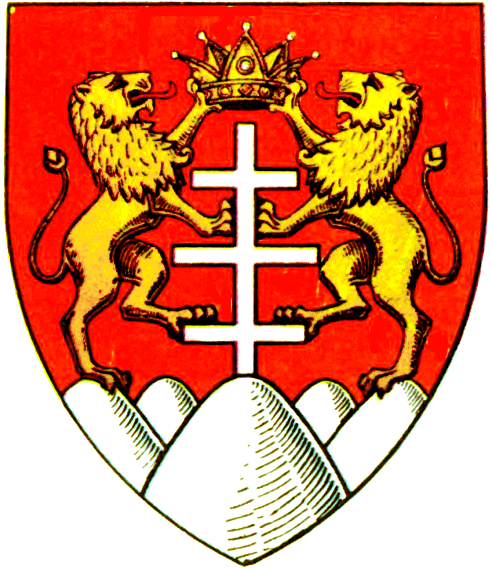
- Coat of arms

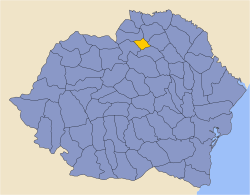
- Country: Romania
- Historic region: Bukovina
- Capital city (Reședință de județ): Suceava
- Established: 1925

Area
  - Total: 1,309 km^{2} (505 sq mi)

Population (1930)
  - Total: 121,327
  - Density: 92.69/km^{2} (240.1/sq mi)
- Time zone: UTC+2 (EET)
  - Summer (DST): UTC+3 (EEST)

In the Kingdom of Romania, between the early 20th century up to the end of the 1940s, the county had a smaller size and population.

The contemporary Suceava county is the result of the merger of other smaller former Romanian counties from the historical regions of Bukovina and Western Moldavia that were functional mostly throughout the interwar period (e.g. Rădăuți County, Câmpulung County) and part of Baia County). As per the administrative reform of 1938 under King Carol II, the whole counties which divided Bukovina in the Kingdom of Romania were united into a bigger land called Ținutul Suceava. Later, during World War II, Suceava County was part of the Bukovina Governorate of Romania.

As for the historical interwar Suceava County, this administrative unit was located in the northern part of Greater Romania and the southern part of the historical region of Bukovina respectively. Its territory was situated entirely within the borders of the current Suceava County, constituting thus the central-eastern part of the contemporary namesake county. During the interwar period, it was the smallest county of Greater Romania by area, covering 1,309 square kilometres (505 sq mi).

It was bordered on the east by the counties of Dorohoi and Botoșani, to the north by Rădăuți County, to the west by Câmpulung County, and to the south by Baia County.

During the communism period, Suceava County was at some point dissolved (as were all other counties in Romania as per the law no. 5 from 6 September 1950), then changed into the Suceava Region and then re-organized once again as county starting from 1968.

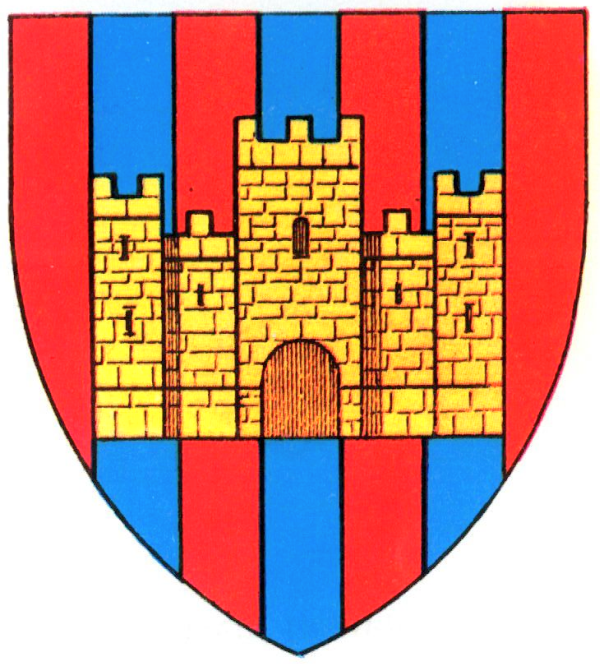
The coat of arms of Ținutul Suceava (1938–1940)

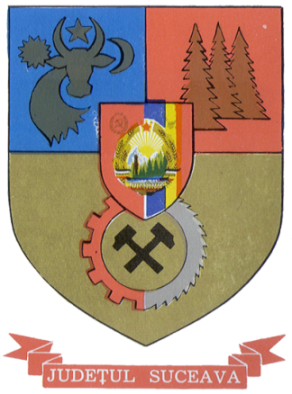
The communist coat of arms of Suceava County

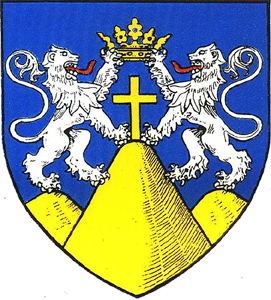
Alternative contemporary coat of arms of Suceava County

=== Administrative organization ===
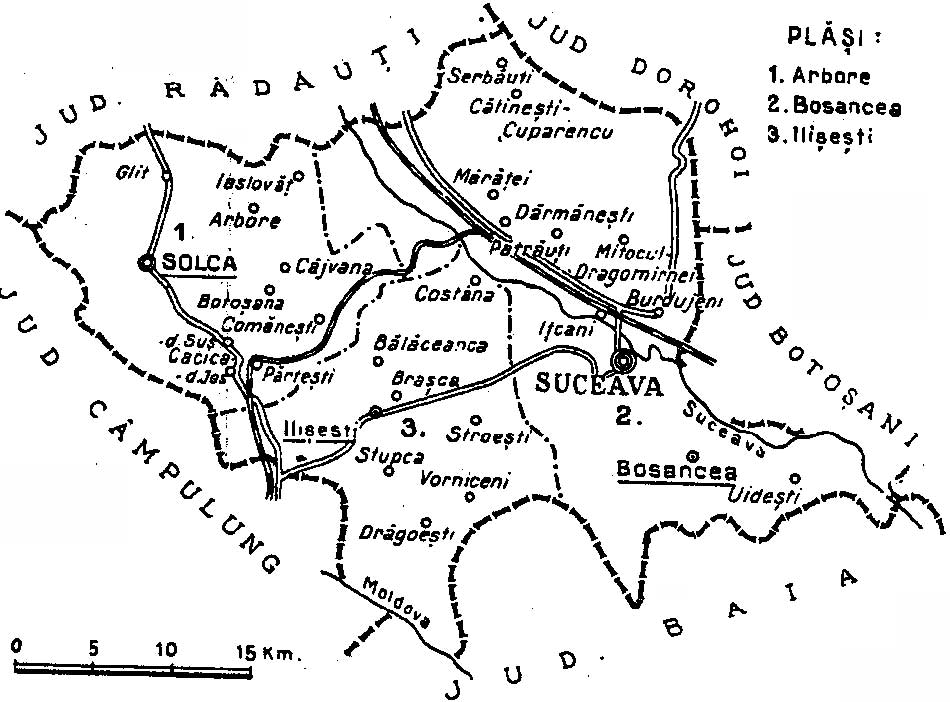
Map of Suceava County as constituted in 1938.

As of 1930, the county was administratively subdivided into three districts (plăși):

1. Plasa Arbore, headquartered at Arbore
2. Plasa Dragomirna, headquartered at Dragomirna
3. Plasa Ilișești, headquartered at Ilișești

In 1938, the county was administratively reorganized into the following districts:

1. Plasa Arbore, headquartered at Solca (containing 15 villages)
2. Plasa Bosancea, headquartered at Bosancea (including 36 villages)
3. Plasa Ilișești, headquartered at Ilișești (including 17 villages)

=== Population ===
According to the 1930 census data, the county population was 121,327, ethnically divided among Romanians (79.5%), Germans (primarily Bukovina Germans but also Zipsers) (8.2%), Jews (5.5%), Poles (2.7%), Ukrainians (1.7%), as well as other ethnic minorities.

By language the county was divided among Romanian (76.5%), German (9.4%), Ukrainian (5.5%), Yiddish (4.3%), Polish (2.5%), as well as other languages. From the religious point of view, the population consisted of Eastern Orthodox (80.1%), Roman Catholic (8.4%), Jewish (5.5%), Evangelical Lutheran (3.3%), Greek Catholic (1.4%), as well as other minor religions.

==== Urban population ====
The county's urban population consisted of 19,850 inhabitants (17,028 in Suceava and 2,822 in Solca), ethnically divided among Romanians (61.5%), Jews (18.7%), Germans (13.9%), Poles (2.6%), as well as other ethnic minorities.

As a mother tongue in the urban population, Romanian (60.4%) predominated, followed by German (18.7%), Yiddish (13.8%), Ukrainian (3.2%), Polish (2.2%), as well as other minor spoken languages. From the religious point of view, the urban population consisted of 60.6% Eastern Orthodox, 18.8% Jewish, 15.3% Roman Catholic, 2.0% Greek Catholic, 1.7% Evangelical Lutheran, 0.7% Baptist as well as other confessional minorities.
