= Vicovu de Jos =

Vicovu de Jos German: Unter Wikow
- Commune
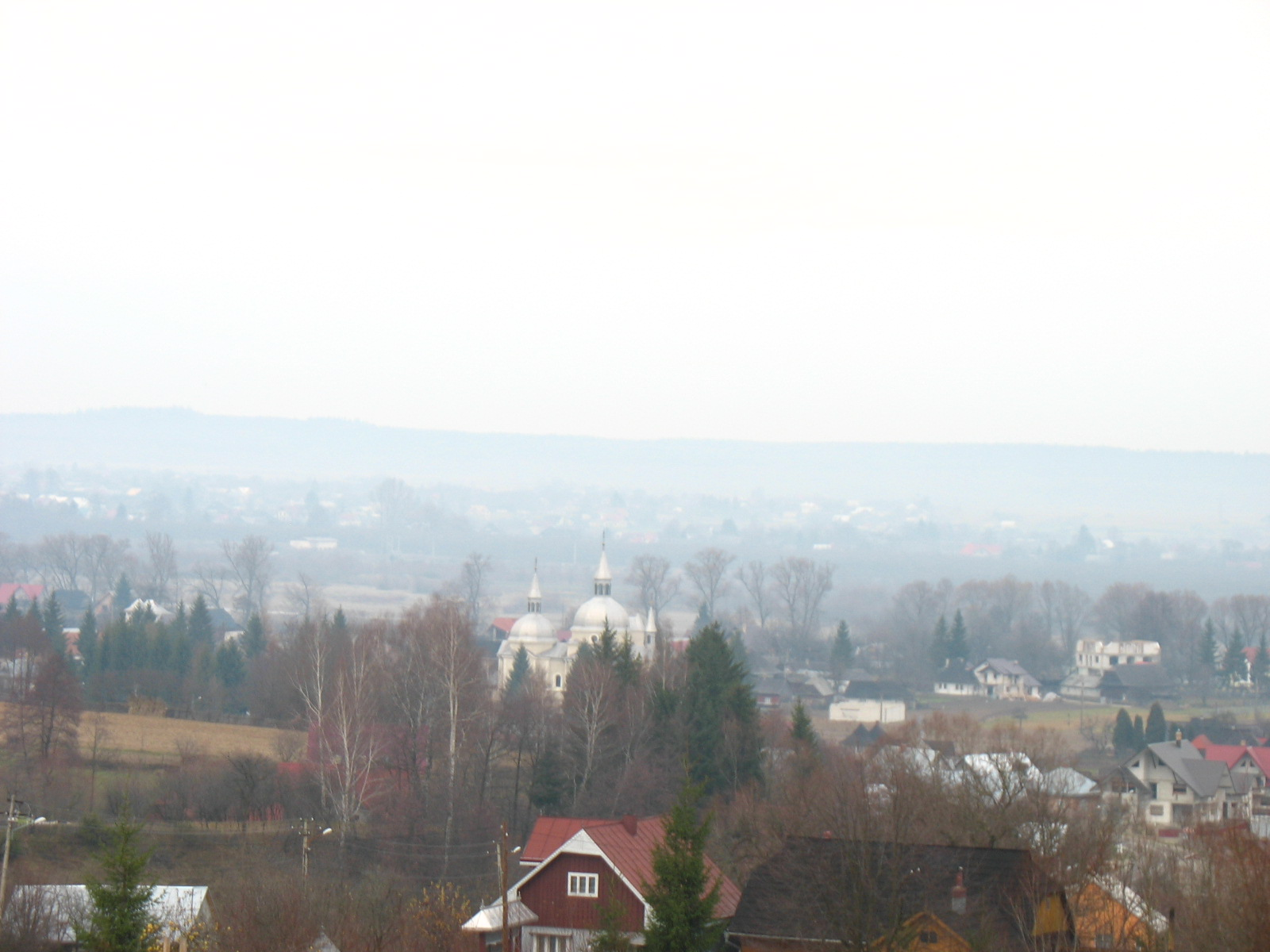
- Vicovu de Jos

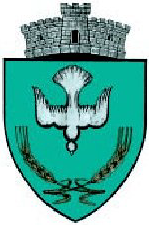
- Coat of arms

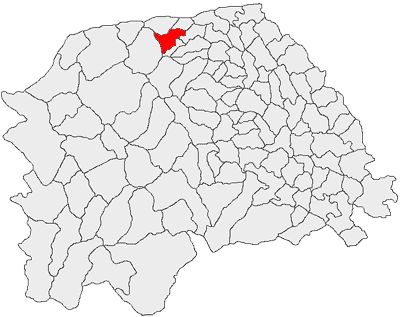
- Location in Suceava County

- Location in Romania
- Coordinates: 47°54′N 25°44′E
- Country: Romania
- County: Suceava

Government
  - Mayor (2020–2024): Vasile Țugui (PSD)
- Area: 42 km^{2} (16 sq mi)
- Elevation: 438 m (1,437 ft)
- Population (2021-12-01): 5,978
  - Density: 140/km^{2} (370/sq mi)
- Time zone: UTC+02:00 (EET)
  - Summer (DST): UTC+03:00 (EEST)
- Postal code: 727605
- Area code: (+40) 02 30
- Vehicle reg.: SV
- Website: www.primariavicovudejos.ro

Vicovu de Jos (German: Unter Wikow or Unterwikow) is a commune located in Suceava County, Bukovina, Romania. It is composed of a single village, Vicovu de Jos.

The commune lies in the hilly area of the Bukovinian Subcarpathians, on the right bank of the Suceava River. It is located in the northern part of the county, 57 km (35 mi) northeast of its capital, Suceava, only a few miles from the Romania–Ukraine border. It borders on the north-west with Vicovu de Sus, on the north with Bilca and the Obcina Mare mountains, on the west with Putna, on the south with Voitinel, and on the east with Gălănești.

Vicovu de Jos is situated at the intersection of national roads DN2E and DN2H. The railway station serves the CFR Line 500, which connects Bucharest with the Ukrainian border near Chernivtsi.

== Notable residents ==
- Pavel Țugui (1921–2021), communist activist and literary historian
- Sofia Vicoveanca (born Sofia Fusa in 1941 in Toporăuți), singer of popular music who was raised in Vicovu de Jos and changed her name out of love for the village
