= Suceava (river) =

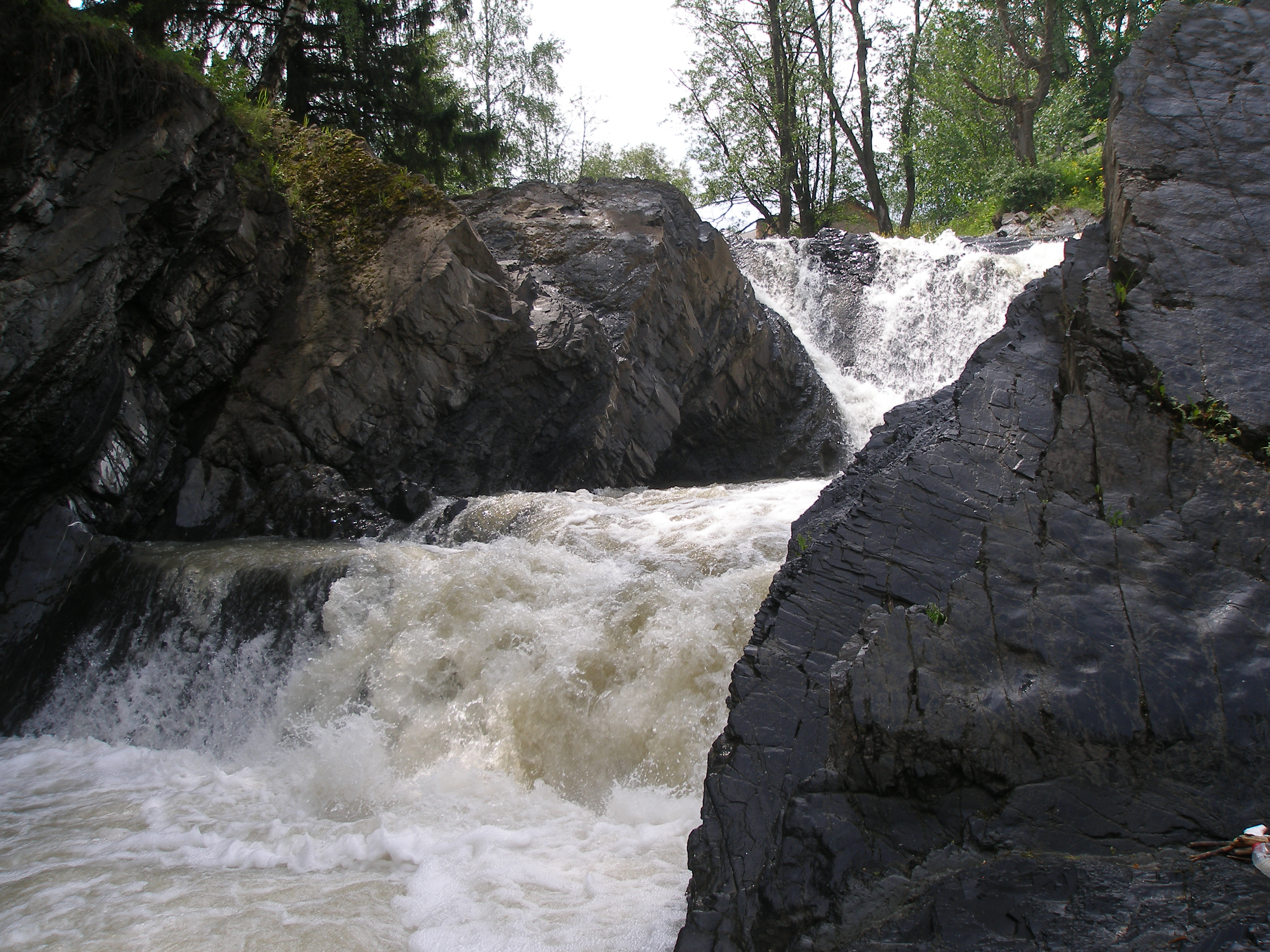
- Suceava waterfall near Shepit

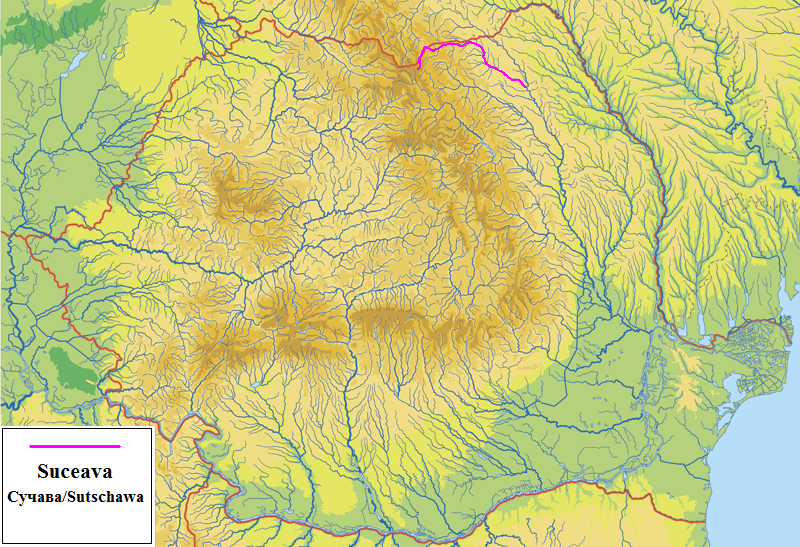
- Native name: Сучава (Ukrainian); Suceava (Romanian)

Location
- Country: Ukraine, Romania
- Counties: Chernivtsi Oblast, Suceava County
- Towns: Suceava

Physical characteristics
- Source: Obcina Mestecăniș Mountains
  - location: Northern Bucovina, Romania
- Mouth: Siret
  - location: Liteni, Romania
  - coordinates: 47°31′19″N 26°33′01″E
- Length: 173 km (107 mi)
- Basin size: 2,625 km^{2} (1,014 sq mi)

Basin features
- Progression: Siret→ Danube→ Black Sea

The Suceava (Ukrainian: Сучава, romanized: Suchava; Romanian: Suceava; Hungarian: Szucsáva) is a river located in the north-east of Romania (Suceava County) and western Ukraine (Chernivtsi Oblast). It is a right tributary of the river Siret. It discharges into the Siret in the town Liteni, 21 km south-east of the city of Suceava.

It rises from the Obcina Mestecăniș Mountains in Bukovina, near the border with Ukraine. The total length of the Suceava from its source to its confluence with the Siret is 173 km (107 mi). Its basin area is 2,625 km^{2} (1,014 sq mi), of which 2,298 km^{2} (887 sq mi) in Romania.

== Towns and villages ==
The following towns and villages are situated along the river Suceava, from the source to mouth: Izvoarele Sucevei, Shepit, Seliatyn, Ulma, Brodina, Vicovu de Jos, Bilca, Dornești, Satu Mare, Suceava, Verești.

== Tributaries ==
The following rivers are tributaries to the river Suceava (from source to mouth):

Left: Aluniș, Izvor, Cobilioara, Garbanevski, Melesh, Rapochev, Rusca, Ulma, Sadău, Falcău, Caraula, Șicova, Bilca Mare, Petrimiasa, Târnauca, Climăuț, Ruda, Horaiț, Hatnuța, Pătrăuțeanca, Dragomirna, Mitoc, Podul Vătafului, Plopeni, Salcea

Right: Pogonișoara, Nisipitu, Brodina, Pârâul Ascuns, Valea Boului, Putna, Vicov, Remezeu, Voitinel, Pozen, Sucevița, Solca, Soloneț, Ilișești, Șcheia, Râul Târgului, Udești, Racova
