= Falcău (disambiguation) =

Falcău may refer to the following places:

- Falcău, a tributary of the Suceava in Suceava County, Romania
- Falcău, a tributary of the Calul in Neamț County, Romania
- Falcău, a village in the commune Brodina, Suceava County, Romania
- Falcău, the Romanian name for the village Falkiv in the commune Dolishniy Shepit, Chernivtsi Oblast, Ukraine
