= Voitinel (river) =

Voitinel Pietroasa
- Location within Romania

Location
- Country: Romania
- Counties: Suceava County
- Villages: Voitinel, Gălănești

Physical characteristics
- Source: Obcina Mare Mountains
- Mouth: Suceava
  - location: Gălănești
  - coordinates: 47.9203°N 25.8212°E
- Length: 20 km (12 mi)
- Basin size: 36 km^{2} (14 sq mi)

Basin features
- Progression: Suceava→ Siret→ Danube→ Black Sea

The Voitinel (also: Pietroasa) is a right tributary of the river Suceava in Romania. It flows into the Suceava near Gălănești. Its length is 20 km (12 mi) and its basin size is 36 km^{2} (14 sq mi).
