= Straja, Suceava =

Straja
- Commune
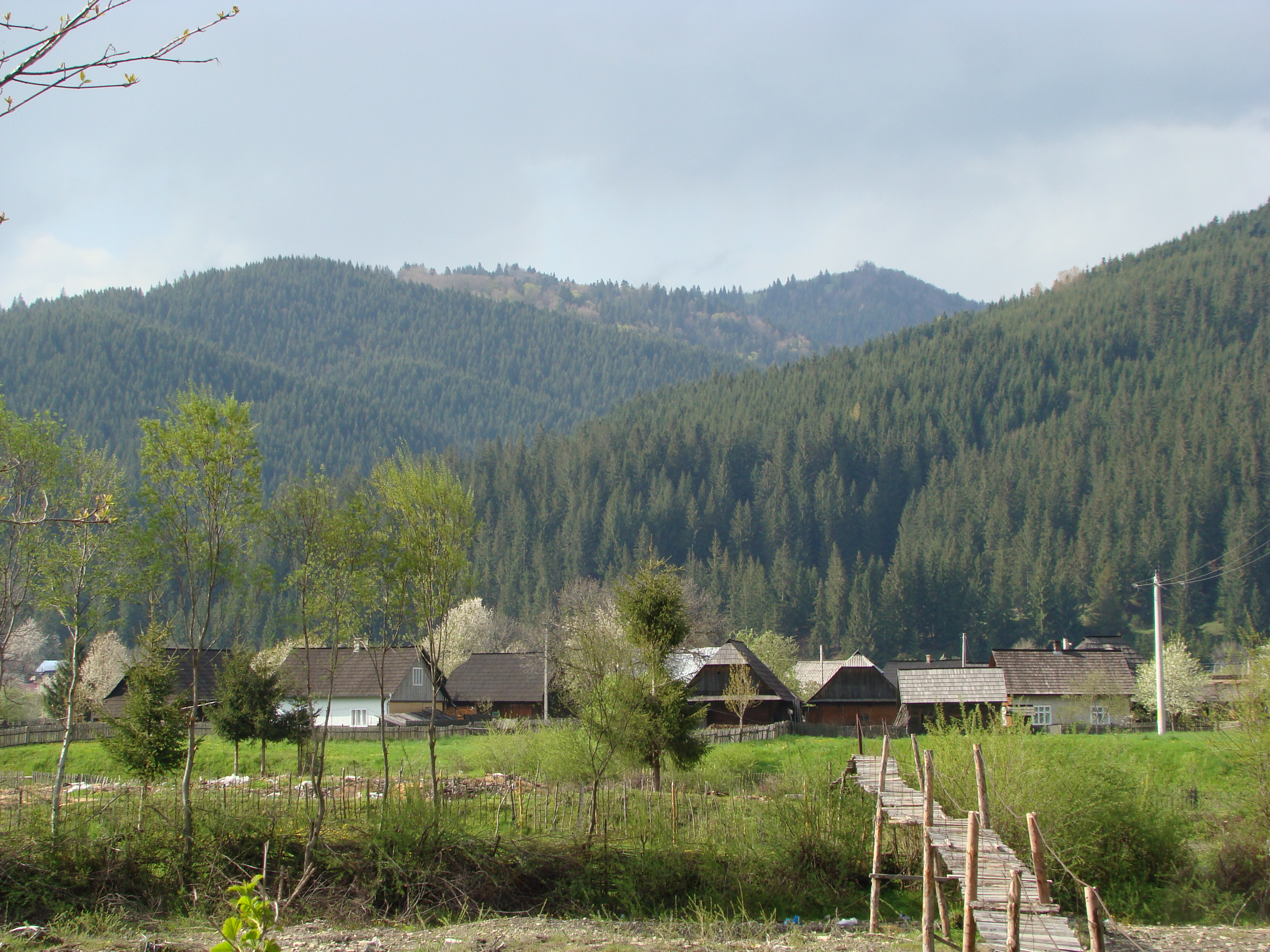
- Overview of Straja

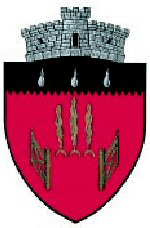
- Coat of arms

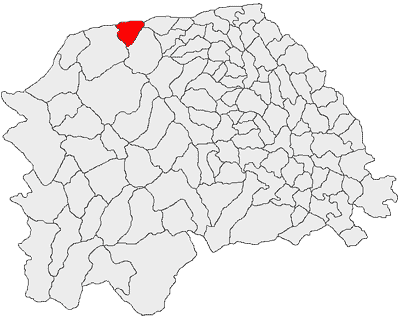
- Location in Suceava County

- Location in Romania
- Coordinates: 47°55′N 25°33′E
- Country: Romania
- County: Suceava

Government
  - Mayor (2024–2028): Mihai Juravle (PSD)
- Area: 45 km^{2} (17 sq mi)
- Elevation: 514 m (1,686 ft)
- Population (2021-12-01): 5,258
  - Density: 120/km^{2} (300/sq mi)
- Time zone: UTC+02:00 (EET)
  - Summer (DST): UTC+03:00 (EEST)
- Postal code: 727495
- Area code: (+40) x30
- Vehicle reg.: SV
- Website: primariastrajasv.ro

Straja (German: Strasza or Strascha) is a commune in Suceava County, Bukovina, northeastern Romania. It is composed of a single village, Straja.

== History ==
Historical affiliations

Moldavia (1388–1775)
Habsburg Monarchy (1775–1804)
Austrian Empire (1804–1867)
Austria-Hungary, Cisleithania (1867–1918)
Kingdom of Romania (1918–1947)
Romanian People's Republic (1947–1965)
Socialist Republic of Romania (1965–1989)
Romania (1989–present)

The first document attesting the existence of Straja dates since 1750. Part of the historical region of Bukovina, it was under Habsburg and Austrian rule (being part of the Duchy of Bukovina, Cisleithania) until 1918 when it became part of the Kingdom of Romania.

== Demographics ==
In 2011, Straja had a population of 5,094, mostly Romanian, and the major religion is Eastern Orthodoxy.

In 1930, according to the census taken in that year, Straja had a population of 4,662, of whom 4,338 were classified as ethnically Romanian, 137 German (more specifically Bukovina Germans), 134 Jewish, 29 Russian, and 15 Polish. The numbers by religion were 4,359 Orthodox, 145 Roman Catholic, 134 Jewish, 13 Evangelical Lutheran, 10 Greek Catholic, and 1 Baptist.

== Politics and local administration ==
=== Communal council ===
The commune's current local council has the following political composition, according to the results of the 2020 Romanian local elections:

Party	Seats	Current Council
Social Democratic Party (PSD)	7	
National Liberal Party (PNL)	6	
People's Movement Party (PMP)	1	
Alliance for the Union of Romanians (AUR)	1	

== Natives ==
- Nicolae Cotos - theologian
- Dimitrie Onciul - historian and academic

== Geoposition ==
Straja is situated in the northern part of Suceava county (47.92° N, 25.55° E), in the Rădăuți valley and is on the banks of the Suceava River. The northern edge of the commune is part of Romania's border with Ukraine.

== Economy ==
The main industry is wood processing.

== Transport ==
Straja has a station on the Suceava to Nisipitu railway line, which traverses the commune from east to west.

County road 209 from Rădăuți to Brodina connects the commune to Romania's national road system. An hourly minibus service, with a journey time of 50 minutes, connects Rădăuți and Straja.
