= Sadău =

- Location within Romania Location within Chernivtsi Oblast

Location
- Country: Ukraine, Romania
- Counties: Chernivtsi O., Suceava C.
- Villages: Sadău

Physical characteristics
- Mouth: Suceava
  - location: Sadău
  - coordinates: 47.8773°N 25.4030°E

Basin features
- Progression: Suceava→ Siret→ Danube→ Black Sea

The Sadău (Ukrainian: Садеу, romanized: Sadeu) is a left tributary of the river Suceava. Its source is located south of Dolishniy Shepit in Ukraine. The river then crosses the border into Romania, joining the Suceava near the village of Sadău. In Romania, its length is 7 km (4.3 mi) and its basin size is 18 km^{2} (6.9 sq mi).
