= Pozen (river) =

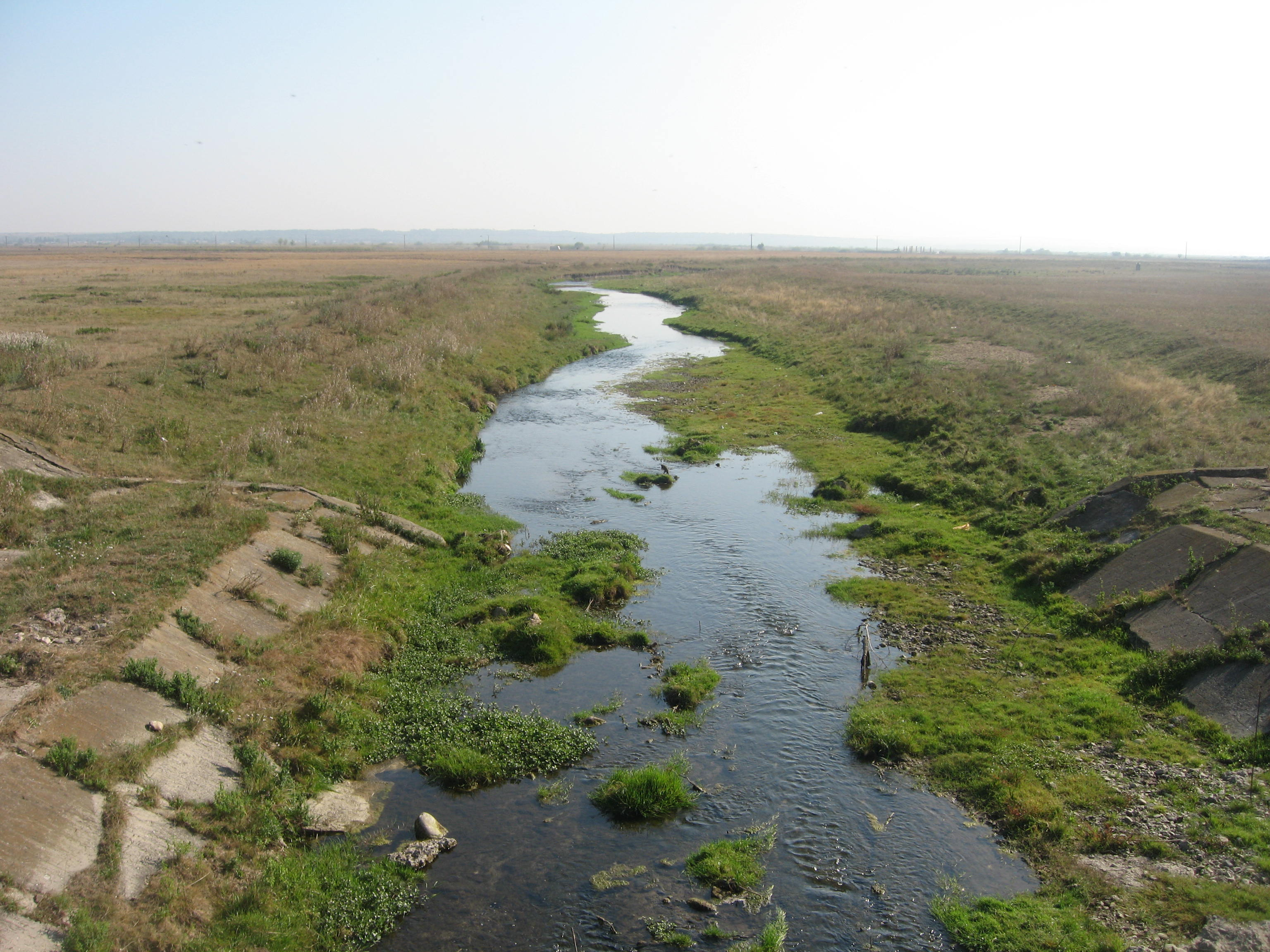

- Location within Romania

Location
- Country: Romania
- Counties: Suceava County
- Villages: Horodnic de Sus, Horodnic de Jos

Physical characteristics
- Source: Obcina Mare Mountains
- Mouth: Suceava
  - location: Satu Mare
  - coordinates: 47.8177°N 26.0051°E
- Length: 32 km (20 mi)
- Basin size: 148 km^{2} (57 sq mi)

Basin features
- Progression: Suceava→ Siret→ Danube→ Black Sea
- Tributaries
  - left: Boișa
  - right: Horodnic

The Pozen is a right tributary of the river Suceava in Romania. It discharges into the Suceava in the village Satu Mare. Its length is 32 km (20 mi) and its basin size is 148 km^{2} (57 sq mi). Part of its water is diverted by a canal from north of Rădăuți to the Suceava near Măneuți, upstream from its natural mouth.
