= Teceu =

Teceu may refer to:

- Teceu Mare, the Romanian name for Tiachiv, Zakarpattia Oblast, Ukraine
- Teceu Mic, a village in Remeți Commune, Maramureș County, Romania
