= Târnauca (river) =

- Location within Romania Location within Chernivtsi Oblast

Location
- Country: Ukraine, Romania
- Counties: Suceava County
- Villages: Frătăuții Noi

Physical characteristics
- Mouth: Suceava
  - location: Costișa
  - coordinates: 47.9177°N 25.8988°E

Basin features
- River system: Suceava→ Siret→ Danube→ Black Sea

The Târnauca is a left tributary of the river Suceava. Its source is located near the village Bila Krynytsia in Ukraine. The river then crosses the border into Romania, joining the Suceava near the village of Costișa. In Romania, its length is 6 km (3.7 mi) and its basin size is 13 km^{2} (5.0 sq mi).
