= Shepit, Chernivtsi Oblast =

Rural locality in Chernivtsi Oblast, Ukraine

Shepit Шепіт Șipotele Sucevei
- Village
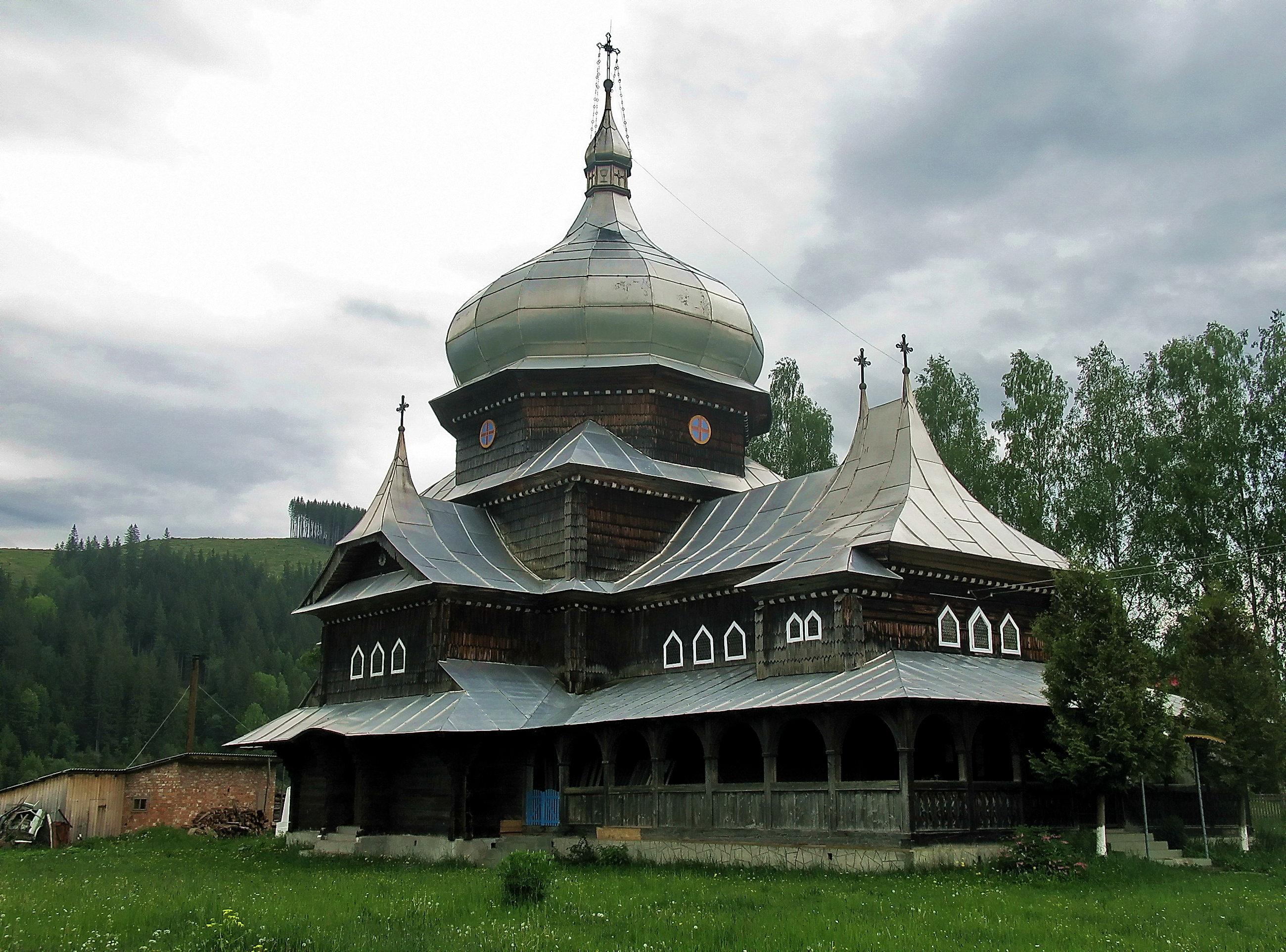
- Church of Saint Elijah in Shepit

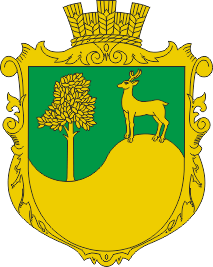
- Coat of arms
- Interactive map of Shepit
- Location in Chernivtsi Oblast Location in Ukraine
- Coordinates: 47°48′17″N 25°8′29″E
- Country: Ukraine
- Oblast: Chernivtsi Oblast
- Raion: Vyzhnytsia Raion
- Hromada: Seliatyn rural hromada

Government
  - Mayor: Valeryy Polyanchuk
- Elevation: 925 m (3,035 ft)

Population (2021)
  - Total: 683
- Time zone: UTC+2 (EET)
  - Summer (DST): UTC+3 (EEST)
- Postal code: 59133
- Area code: +380 3738
- KOATUU: 7323586001

Shepit (Ukrainian: Шепіт, romanized: Šepit; Romanian: Șipotele Sucevei; German: Schepit or Schipoth bei Suczeawa) is a village in Vyzhnytsia Raion, Chernivtsi Oblast, Ukraine. It belongs to Seliatyn rural hromada, one of the hromadas of Ukraine. Population: 683.

A geological reserve is found within the village limits, the Suchavskyi Huk waterfalls (Ukrainian: Сучавський Гук, Suceava's rapids, Suceava's roar).

A checkpoint on the border with Romania (Shepit-Izvoarele Sucevei) is located not far from the village.

== History ==
The town of Shepit, on the banks of the Suceava river, has been part of Bukovina in the Principality of Moldova since its establishment. The first documentary record of the village dates from a deed dated 15 March 1490.

In January 1775, in recognition of its neutrality during Russo-Turkish War of 1768–1774, the Habsburg Empire received part of the territory of Moldavia, known as Bukovina, from the Russian Empire which occupied the region from 15 December 1769 to September 1774. After the annexation of Bukovina by the Habsburg Empire in 1775, the town of Schepit (Șipotele Sucevei, Shepit) was part of the Duchy of Bukovina, being part of the Seletin district (Seletin in German).

According to the Austrian 1900 census, there were 804 houses in the village of Schepit (Radautz District, Duchy of Bukovina), with 3323 inhabitants: 2551 Ukrainians, 18 Romanians, 123 Germans, 391 Jews and 167 Poles. There was also a Vorwerk in nearby Isvor (Izvoarele Sucevei) : there were 18 houses, 65 inhabitants: 17 Ukrainians, 2 Romanians, 29 Germans, 7 Jews, 2 Poles).

After the Dissolution of Austria-Hungary and the Union of Bukovina with Romania on November 28, 1918, the village of Shepit was part of the Kingdom of Romania, in the Plasă of Putila of Rădăuți County. At that time, the majority of the population was made up of Ukrainians, and there were communities of Romanians and Jews. In the interwar period, a telephone office operated there.

Following the Molotov–Ribbentrop Pact (1939), Northern Bukovina (Chernivtsi Oblast) was annexed by the USSR on June 28, 1940. The Soviet invasion of Bukovina in 1940 violated the pact, since it went beyond the Soviet sphere of influence that had been agreed with the Axis. Northern Bukovina rejoined Romania in 1941–1944. During the Second World War, heavy fighting took place on the territory of the village for 13 days between the Romanian-German and Soviet armies.

Until 1946, the village was called Shepit-Cameral (Ukrainian: Шепіт-Камерал, in Russian: Шепот-Камерал, Shepot-Kameral) when by the Decree of the Presidium of the Supreme Soviet of the Ukrainian SSR, it was renamed Shepit (Shepot in Russian).

Until 18 July 2020, Shepit belonged to Putyla Raion. The raion was abolished in July 2020 as part of the administrative reform of Ukraine, which reduced the number of raions of Chernivtsi Oblast to three. The area of Putyla Raion was merged into Vyzhnytsia Raion.

=== The Church of St. Elijah ===
The wooden church of St. Elijah is a masterpiece of wooden architecture. It is located on a hill in the northern part of the village. Built in 1898 on the site of the old Church of the Assumption (1763), the Church of St. Elijah in Shepit and its bell tower, located south of it are merger of traditional Bukovinian single-domed architecture and Art Nouveau, dominant in late 19th century. The church is an Architectural monument of national importance in Chernivtsi Oblast (№ 1763 1). It belongs to the Orthodox Church of Ukraine.

== Notable natives ==
- Ciprian Porumbescu (1853–1883), Romanian composer

== Gallery ==
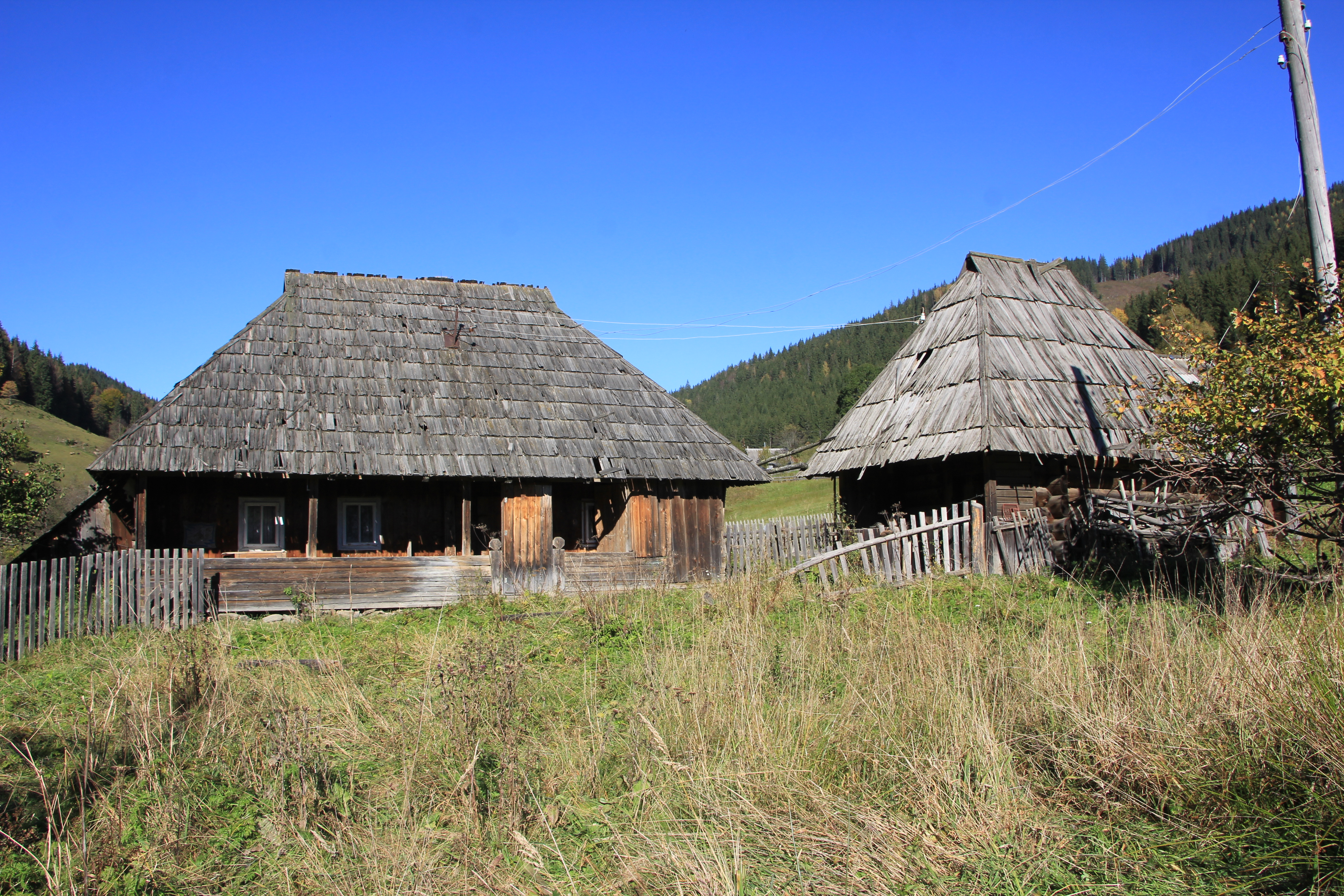
Old wooden house

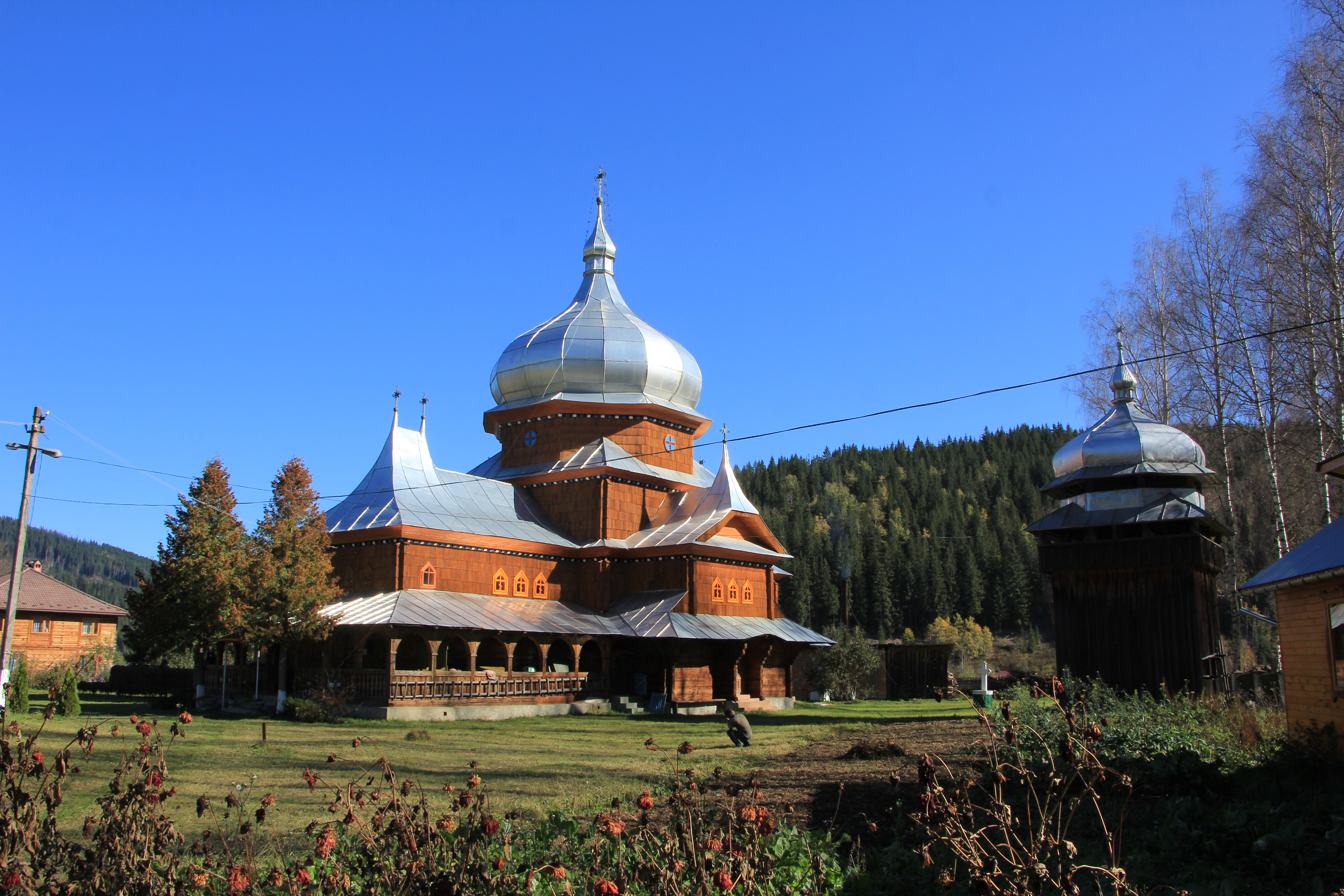
Wooden Church of St. Elijah (1898)

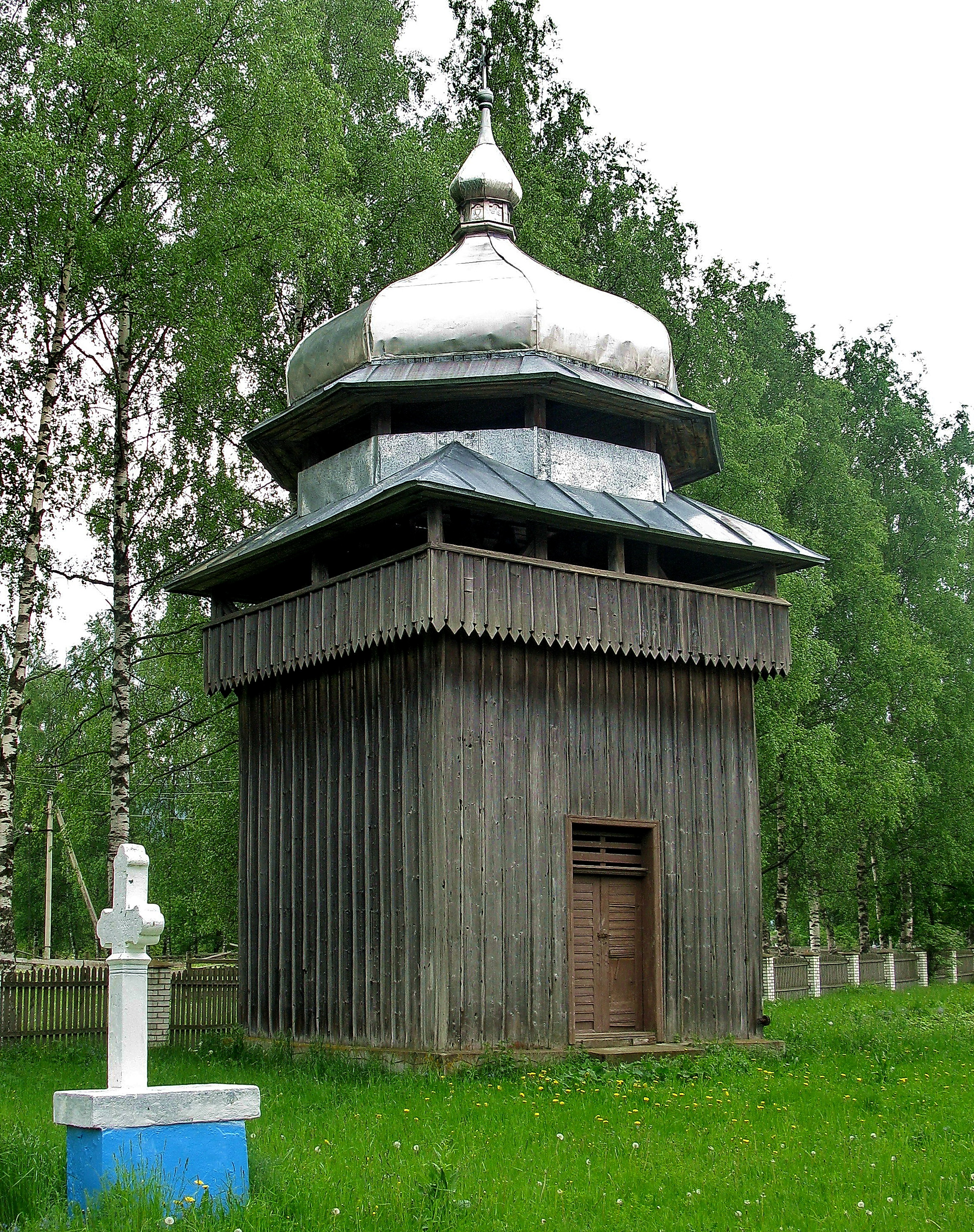
St. Elijah's bell tower

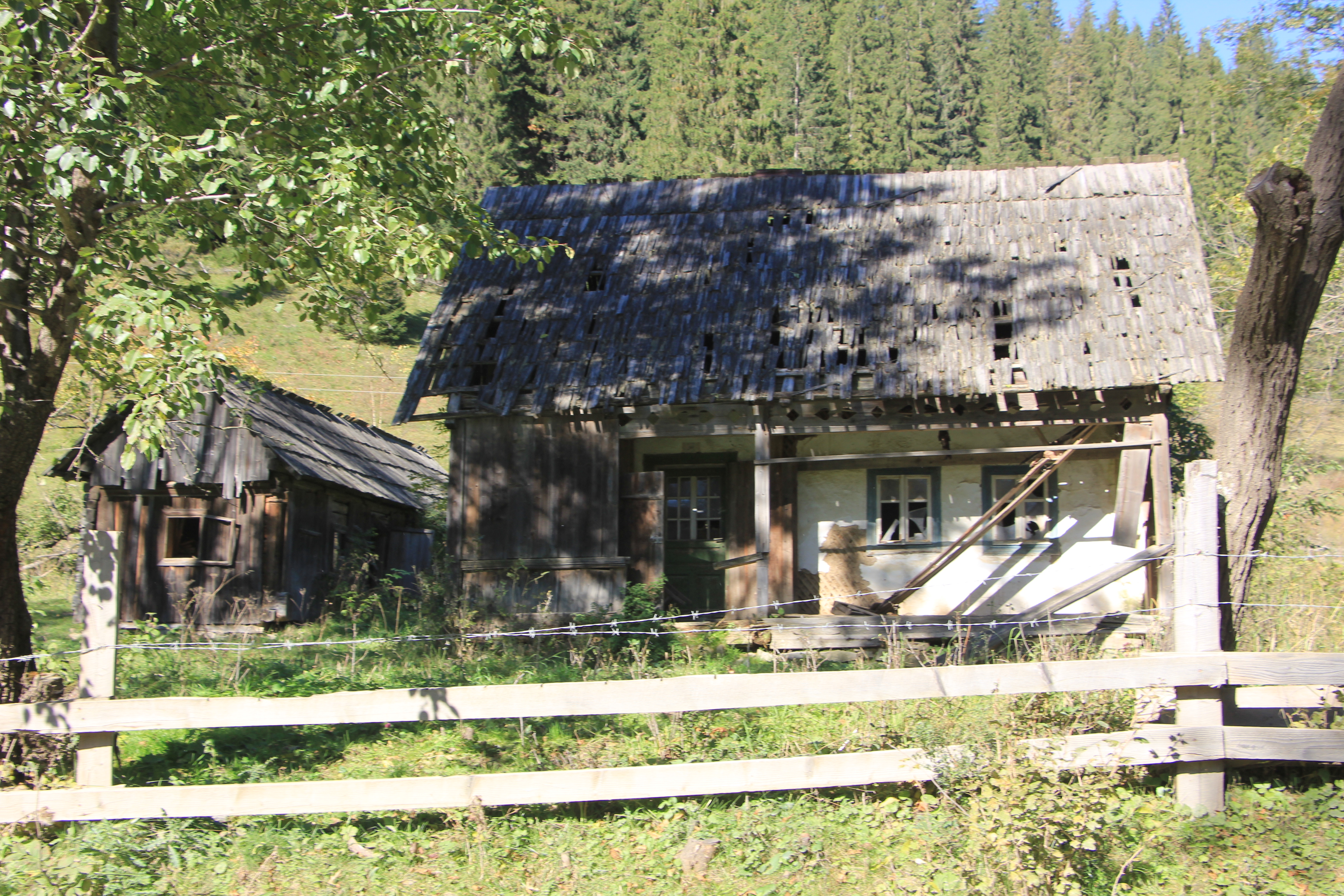
Old wooden house

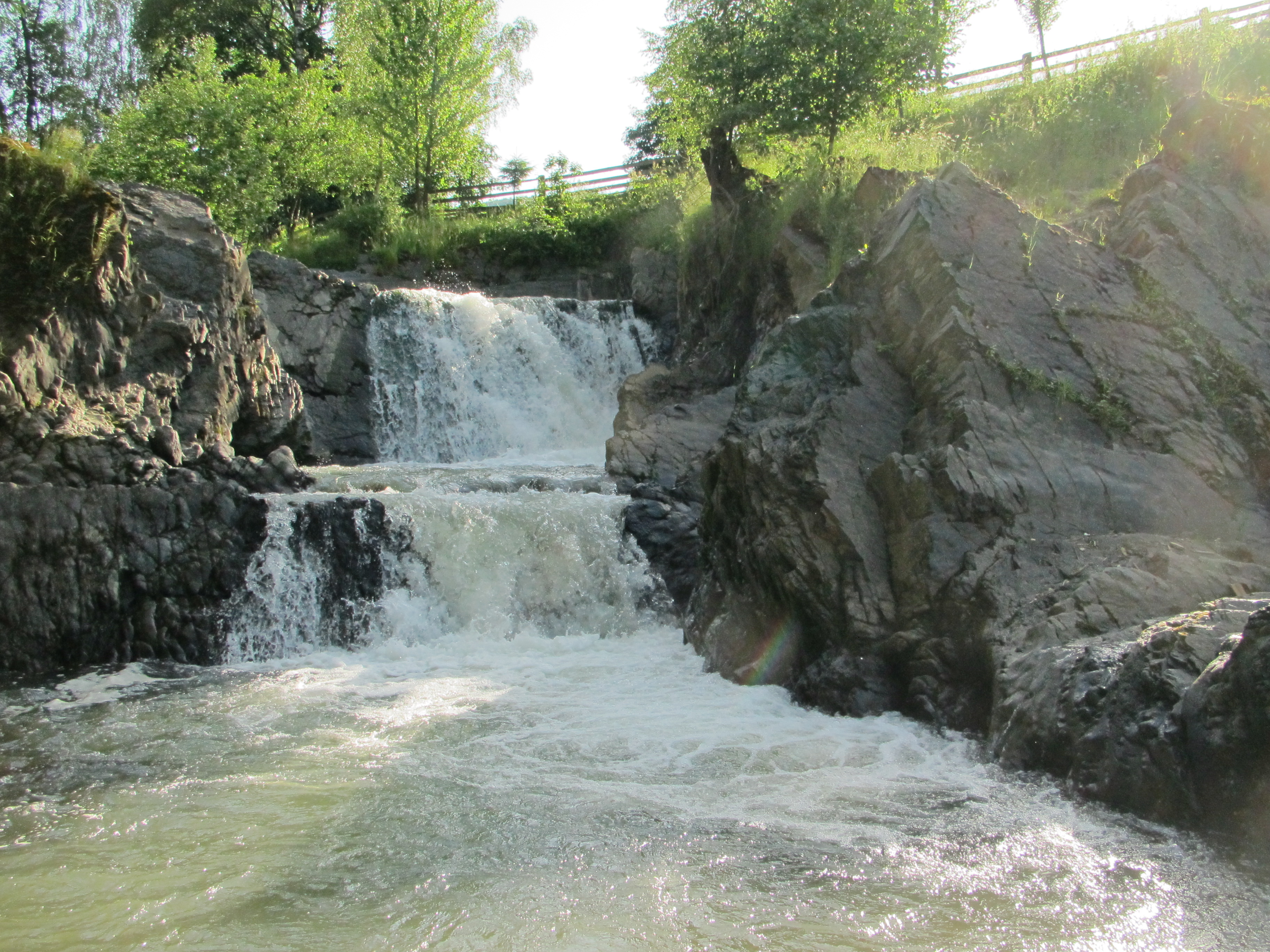
Suchavsʹkyy Huk waterfall
