= Hatnuța =

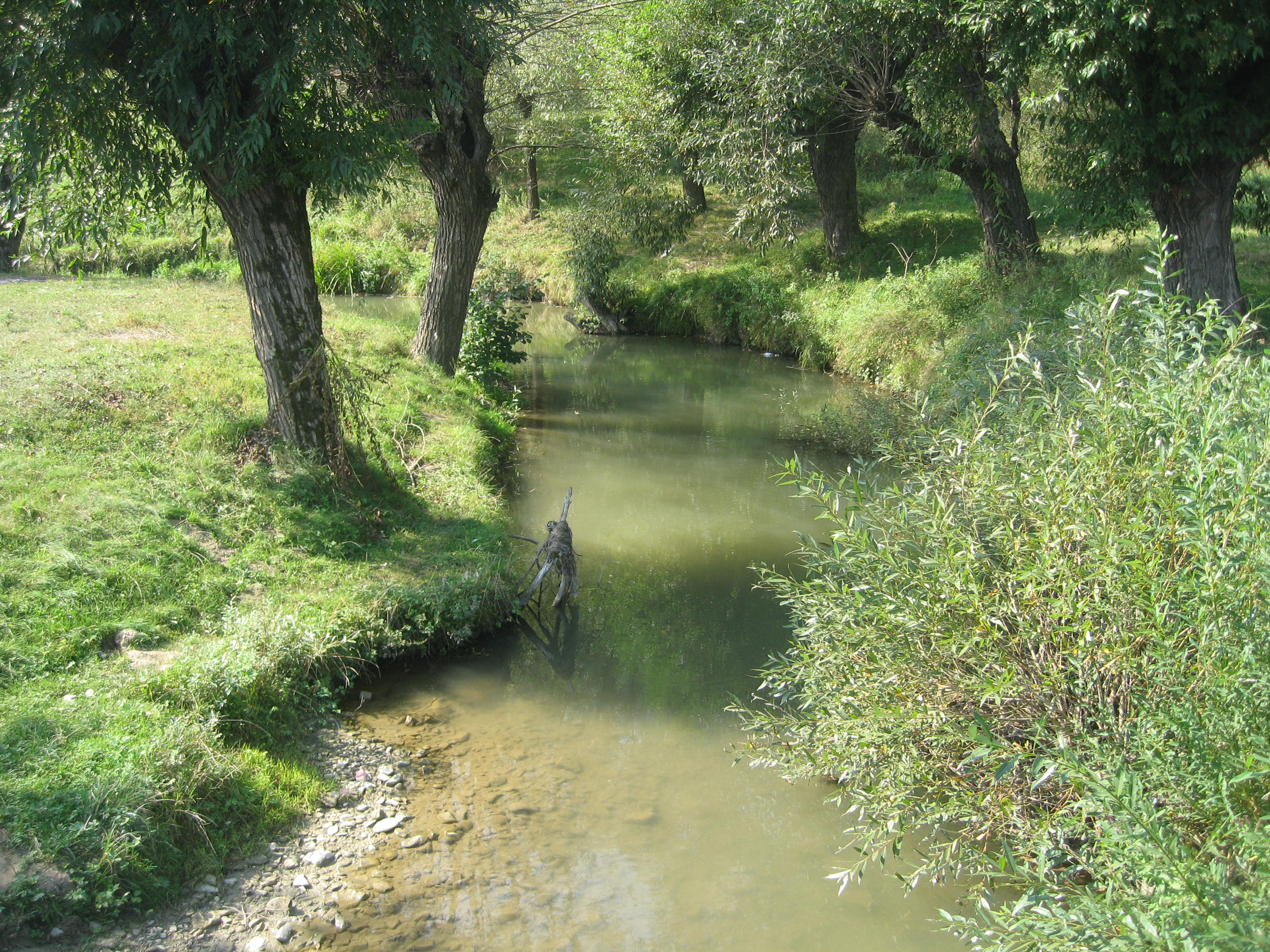
- Hatnuța River in Dărmănești

- Location within Romania

Location
- Country: Romania
- Counties: Suceava County
- Villages: Calafindești, Măriței, Dărmănești

Physical characteristics
- Mouth: Suceava
  - location: Dărmănești
  - coordinates: 47.6938°N 26.1632°E
- Length: 21 km (13 mi)
- Basin size: 73 km^{2} (28 sq mi)

Basin features
- Progression: Suceava→ Siret→ Danube→ Black Sea
- Tributaries
  - left: Bocancea

The Hatnuța is a left tributary of the river Suceava in Romania. It discharges into the Suceava near Dărmănești. Its length is 21 km (13 mi) and its basin size is 73 km^{2} (28 sq mi).
