= Frătăuții =

Frătăuții may refer to one of two communes in Suceava County, Romania:

- Frătăuții Noi
- Frătăuții Vechi
