= Brodina (river) =

- Location within Romania

Location
- Country: Romania
- Counties: Suceava County
- Villages: Brodina de Sus, Brodina de Jos, Brodina

Physical characteristics
- Mouth: Suceava
  - location: Brodina
  - coordinates: 47.8872°N 25.4288°E
- Length: 29 km (18 mi)
- Basin size: 142 km^{2} (55 sq mi)

Basin features
- Progression: Suceava→ Siret→ Danube→ Black Sea
- Tributaries
  - right: Sludnica, Cununschi, Brodinoara

The Brodina is a right tributary of the river Suceava in Romania. It discharges into the Suceava in the village Brodina. Its length is 29 km (18 mi) and its basin size is 142 km^{2} (55 sq mi).
