= Falcău =

- Location within Romania Location within Chernivtsi Oblast

Location
- Country: Ukraine, Romania
- Counties: Chernivtsi Oblast, Suceava County
- Villages: Falcău

Physical characteristics
- Mouth: Suceava
  - location: Falcău
  - coordinates: 47.9087°N 25.4754°E

Basin features
- Progression: Suceava→ Siret→ Danube→ Black Sea
- Tributaries
  - right: Cimirnariu

The Falcău (Ukrainian: Фальків, romanized: Falkiv) is a left tributary of the river Suceava. Its source is located in the municipality of Dolishniy Shepit in Vyzhnytsia Raion, Ukraine. The river then crosses the border into Romania, joining the Suceava near the village of Falcău. In Romania, its length is 3 km (1.9 mi) and its basin size is 14 km^{2} (5.4 sq mi).
