= Laura River =

Laura River may refer to:

- Laura River (Romania)
- Laura River (Queensland)
- Laura River (Western Australia)

== See also ==
- Laura (disambiguation)
