= Horaiț =

- Location within Romania

Location
- Country: Romania
- Counties: Suceava County
- Villages: Bălcăuți, Grănicești, Românești

Physical characteristics
- Mouth: Suceava
  - location: Slobozia Sucevei
  - coordinates: 47.7459°N 26.0619°E
- Length: 24 km (15 mi)
- Basin size: 59 km^{2} (23 sq mi)

Basin features
- Progression: Suceava→ Siret→ Danube→ Black Sea

The Horaiț is a left tributary of the river Suceava in Romania. It discharges into the Suceava in Slobozia Sucevei. Its length is 24 km (15 mi) and its basin size is 59 km^{2} (23 sq mi).
