= Romania–Ukraine border =

International border

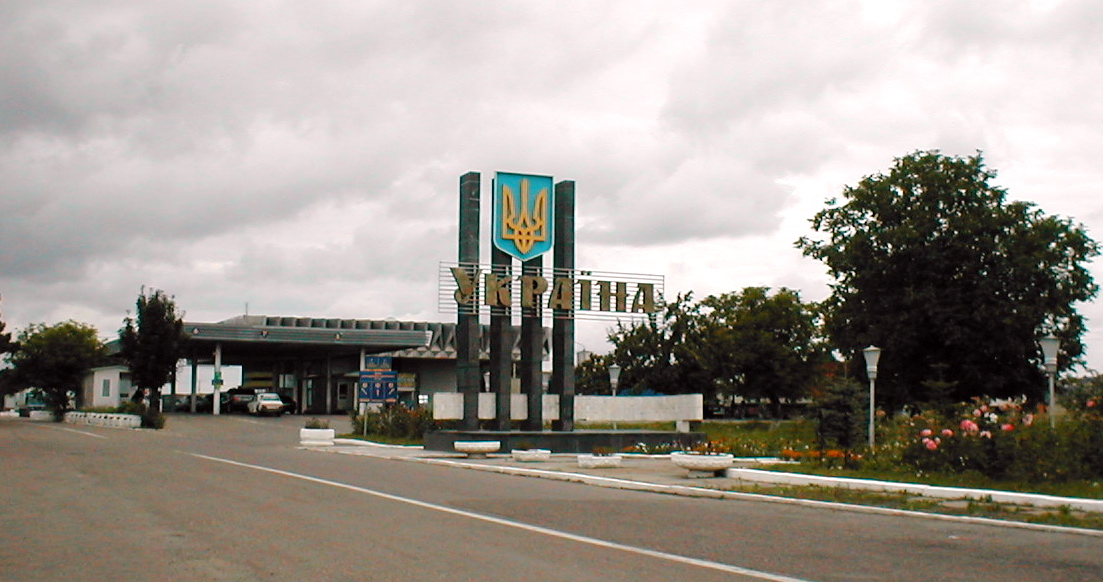
- Ukrainian border between Siret, Romania and Porubna, Ukraine on route E85

Characteristics
- Entities: Romania Ukraine
- Length: 613.8 kilometers

History
- Established: 1918; 1991; Creation of the Ukrainian People's Republic; Declaration of Independence of Ukraine
- Current shape: 3 February 2009; Maritime Delimitation in the Black Sea case
- Disestablished: 18 March 1921; Ukrainian People's Republic disestablished (Peace of Riga)
- Treaties: Paris Peace Treaties, 1947; Treaty of Good Neighborly Relations and Cooperation between Ukraine and Romania (1997); Maritime Delimitation in the Black Sea case (2009)

The Romania–Ukraine border is the state border between Romania and Ukraine. It consists of both a land and a maritime boundary. The total border length is 613.8 km (381.4 mi) including 292.2 km (181.6 mi) by rivers and 33 km (21 mi) by the Black Sea. It is part of the external border of the European Union (since Romania's accession to the EU in January 2007).

The maritime delimitation between the two countries, including the continental shelf and exclusive economic zone was adjudicated at the International Court of Justice (ICJ) in 2009.

== Location ==
Romanian and Ukrainian boundary markers

The land border consists of two parts: the northern part stretches across Carpathian Mountains region roughly west–east from the Hungary-Romania-Ukraine tripoint to the northern Moldova-Romania-Ukraine tripoint. It starts along the Tisza River (through Maramureș) and runs across the historical region of Bukovina in the Eastern Carpathians. The southern part stretches between Budjak and Dobruja regions roughly west–east from the southern Moldova-Romania-Ukraine tripoint to the maritime Romania-Ukraine boundary. It runs along the Danube River, its Chilia branch (most northern branch) of its delta to the Black Sea. Until Soviet occupation of Bessarabia and Northern Bukovina, Dniester (Nistru) river used to serve as international border between Ukraine (later the Ukrainian Soviet Socialist Republic) and Romania.

== History ==
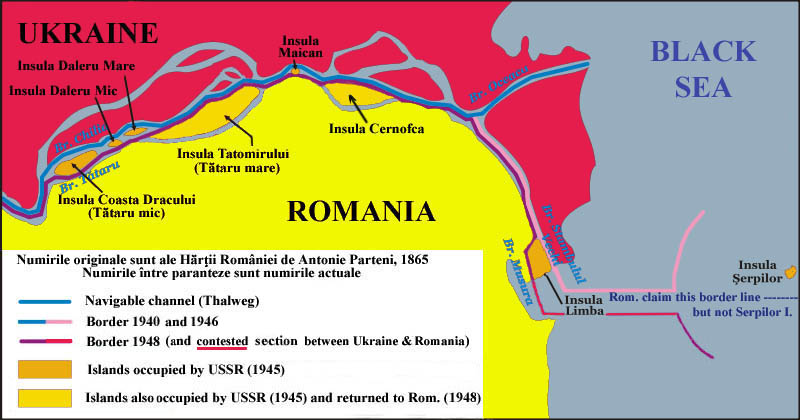
Border along the Danube

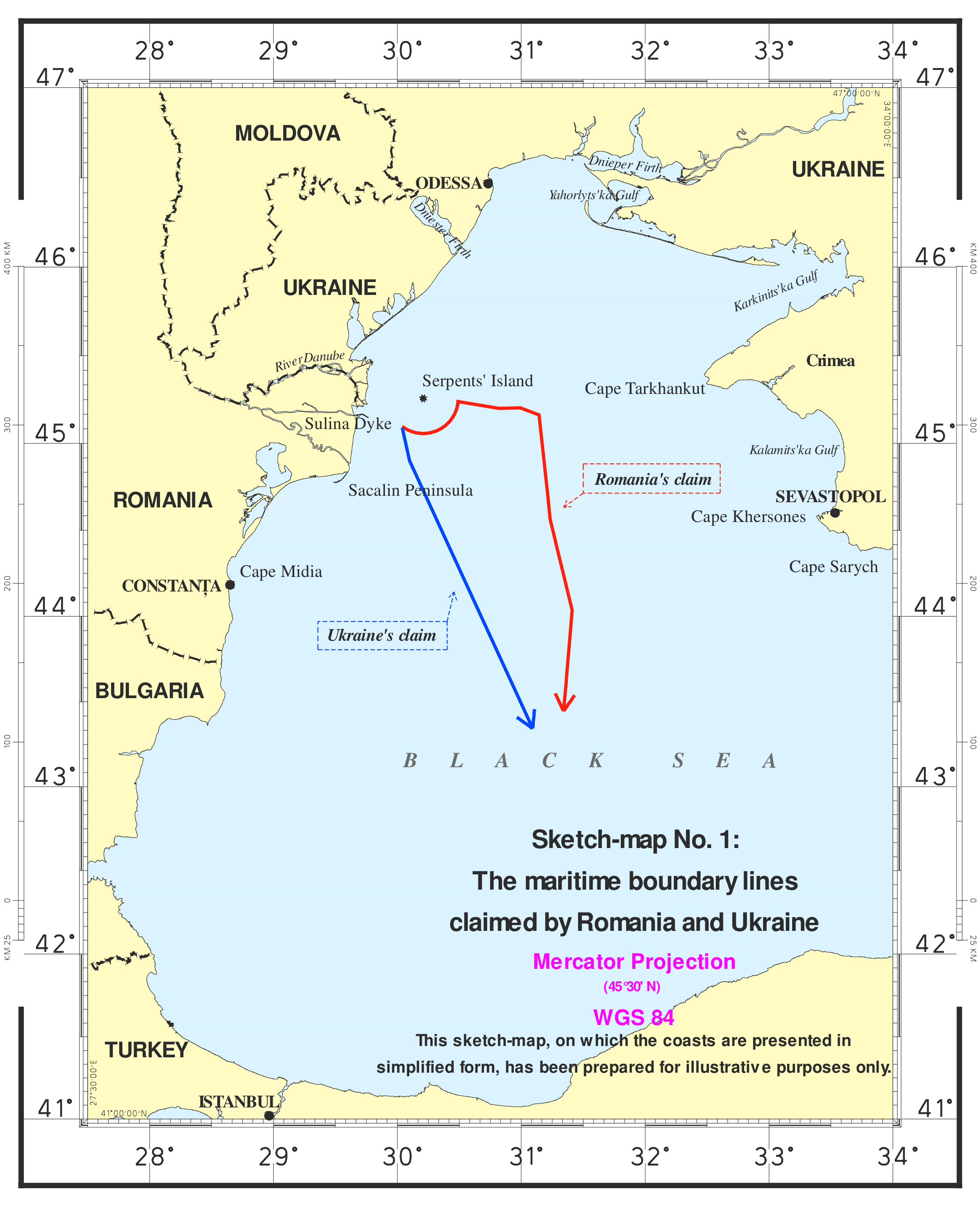
Maritime border

The border is mostly inherited from the Romania–Soviet Union border, with some border disputes, most notable being the Snake Island issue. On 4 July 2003 the President of Romania Ion Iliescu and the President of Russia Vladimir Putin signed a treaty about friendship and cooperation. Romania promised not to contest territories of Ukraine or Moldova, which it lost to Soviet Union after World War II, but requested that Russia as a successor of the Soviet Union recognized its responsibility in some form for what had happened.

Nonetheless, the very next year in 2004 Romania contested Ukrainian maritime territory around the Snake Island in the ICJ in what became known as the Maritime Delimitation in the Black Sea case. Romania was able to partially win the case.

== Border crossings and checkpoints ==
The following border crossings exist (listed from Northwest to Southeast):

(Romania) Romanian name	County	(Ukraine) Ukrainian name	Oblast	Route in Romania	Route in Ukraine	Status	Opening times
Halmeu	Satu Mare	Dyakove	Transcarpathia	railway	railway	international	24 hours
Halmeu	Satu Mare	Dyakove	Transcarpathia			international	24 hours
Câmpulung la Tisa	Maramureș	Teresva	Transcarpathia	railway	railway	international	24 hours
Sighetu Marmației	Maramureș	Solotvyno	Transcarpathia	adjacent to		international	24 hours
Valea Vișeului	Maramureș	Dilove	Transcarpathia	railway	railway	international	24 hours
Ulma	Suceava	Seliatyn	Chernivtsi	209G	local road	local	??
Vicovu de Sus	Suceava	Krasnoilsk	Chernivtsi		T-2608	international	08:00-20:00
Vicșani	Suceava	Vadul-Siret	Chernivtsi	railway	railway	international	24 hours
Siret	Suceava	Porubne	Chernivtsi			international	24 hours
Racovăț	Botoșani	Diakivtsi	Chernivtsi	291C	local road	international	24 hours
Isaccea	Tulcea	Orlivka	Odesa	ferry	ferry	international	24 hours
Plauru	Tulcea	Izmail	Odesa	ferry	ferry	local	07-00-20:00
Chilia Veche	Tulcea	Kiliia	Odesa	ferry	ferry	local	07-00-20:00
Periprava	Tulcea	Vylkove	Odesa	ferry	ferry	local	07-00-20:00

Five further crossings are planned at:

- Remeți/Yablunivka
- Tarna Mare/Khyzha
- Sighetu Marmației-East/Bila Tserkva
- Izvoarele Sucevei/Shepit
- Climăuți/Bila Krynytsya

== Local border traffic ==
In 2014, Romania and Ukraine signed a provisional agreement on local border traffic. It applies to the residents within the 30 km (19 mi) border area extendable to 50 km (31 mi) to accommodate larger administrative units extending beyond the 30 km zone, listed in Annex 1 to the Agreement.

The agreement was subject to the completion of the necessary internal formalities. The Romanian side completed them in March 2014. The Ukrainian side complete its arrangements in May 2015. The agreement covers 662 localities in Ukraine Transcarpathia (Zakarpattia Oblast: Ivano-Frankivsk, Odesa, Chernivtsi). It is applicable to about 2 million Ukrainian and Romanian residents.

== See also ==
- State Border of Ukraine
- Category:Romania–Ukraine border crossings
