= Izvoarele Sucevei =

Izvoarele Sucevei Ізвори
- Commune
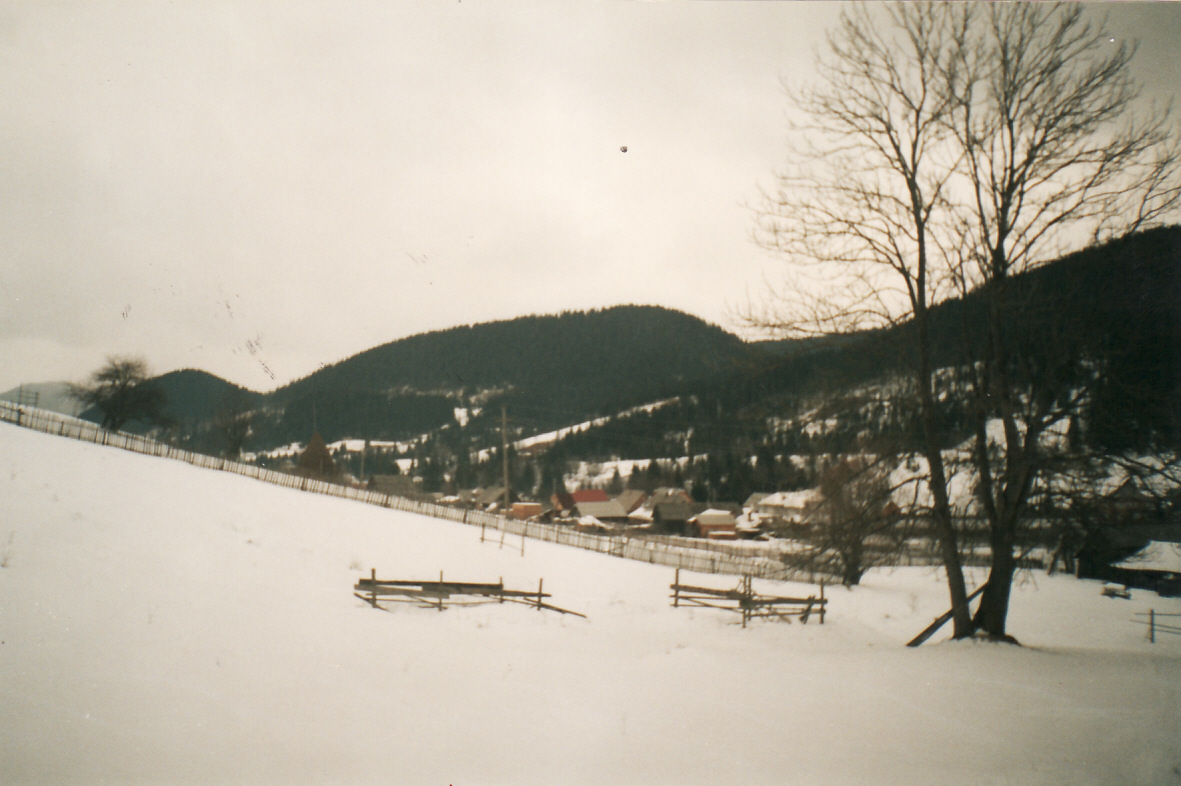
- Wintry view of Izvoarele Sucevei

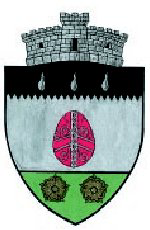
- Coat of arms

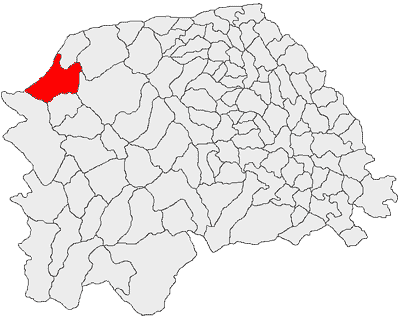
- Location within the county

- Location in Romania
- Coordinates: 47°45′N 25°11′E
- Country: Romania
- County: Suceava

Government
  - Mayor (2020–2024): Mihail Mechno (PNL)
- Area: 132 km^{2} (51 sq mi)
- Elevation: 1,033 m (3,389 ft)
- Highest elevation: 1,506 m (4,941 ft)
- Lowest elevation: 790 m (2,590 ft)
- Population (2021-12-01): 1,984
  - Density: 15.0/km^{2} (38.9/sq mi)
- Time zone: UTC+02:00 (EET)
  - Summer (DST): UTC+03:00 (EEST)
- Postal code: 727330
- Vehicle reg.: SV
- Website: primariaizvoarelesucevei.ro

Izvoarele Sucevei (Ukrainian: Ізвори, Izvory; German: Iswor) is a commune located in Suceava County, Bukovina, northeastern Romania. It is composed of three villages: namely Bobeica, Brodina (also called Brodina de Sus), and Izvoarele Sucevei.

The commune is located in the northwestern part of the county, on the border with Chernivtsi Oblast, Ukraine. The Suceava River arises from the nearby Obcina Mestecăniș Mountains, and flows south to north through the commune. The river Brodina flows through the village of Brodina de Sus, discharging into the Suceava in the nearby Brodina commune.

At the 2011 census, 54.7% of inhabitants were Ukrainians and 45.2% Romanians. At the 2002 census, 73.9% were Eastern Orthodox, 23.2% stated they belonged to another religion, and 2.7% were Seventh-day Adventist.

== Administration and local politics ==
=== Commune council ===
The commune's current local council has the following political composition, according to the results of the 2020 Romanian local elections:

Party	Seats	Current Council
National Liberal Party (PNL)	4	
Social Democratic Party (PSD)	4	
Save Romania Union (USR)	2	
Union of the Ukrainians of Romania (UUR)	1	

== Natives ==
- Vasile Hutopilă
