= Baia (Tisza) =

- Location within Romania

Location
- Country: Romania
- Counties: Maramureș County
- Villages: Remeți

Physical characteristics
- Mouth: Tisza
  - location: Remeți
  - coordinates: 47.9917°N 23.6451°E
- Length: 8 km (5.0 mi)
- Basin size: 17 km^{2} (6.6 mi^{2})
- Discharge
  - location: Near mouth
  - average: (Period: 1971–2000)0.24 m^{3}/s (8.5 cu ft/s)

Basin features
- Progression: Tisza→ Danube→ Black Sea

The Baia is a left tributary of the river Tisza in Romania. It discharges into the Tisza in Remeți, on the border with Ukraine. Its length is 8 km (5.0 mi) and its basin size is 17 km^{2} (6.6 sq mi).
