= Climăuț =

- Location within Romania

Location
- Country: Ukraine, Romania
- Counties: Suceava County
- Villages: Climăuți

Physical characteristics
- Mouth: Suceava
  - location: Iaz
  - coordinates: 47.8944°N 25.9669°E

Basin features
- Progression: Suceava→ Siret→ Danube→ Black Sea
- Tributaries
  - right: Rusul

The Climăuț or Moise (Ukrainian: Мойсе) is a left tributary of the river Suceava in Ukraine and Romania. Its source is located near Stary Vovchynets, Ukraine. The river then crosses the border into Romania, crosses the village of Climăuți, joining the Suceava near the village of Iaz. In Romania, its length is 12 km (7.5 mi) and its basin size is 28 km^{2} (11 sq mi).
