= Nicolae Cotos =

Romanian theologian (1883 - 1959)

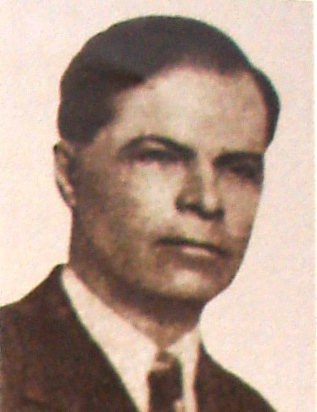
Nicolae Cotos

Nicolae Cotos (October 10, 1883–May 15, 1959) was an Austro-Hungarian-born Romanian theologian, within the Romanian Orthodox Church.

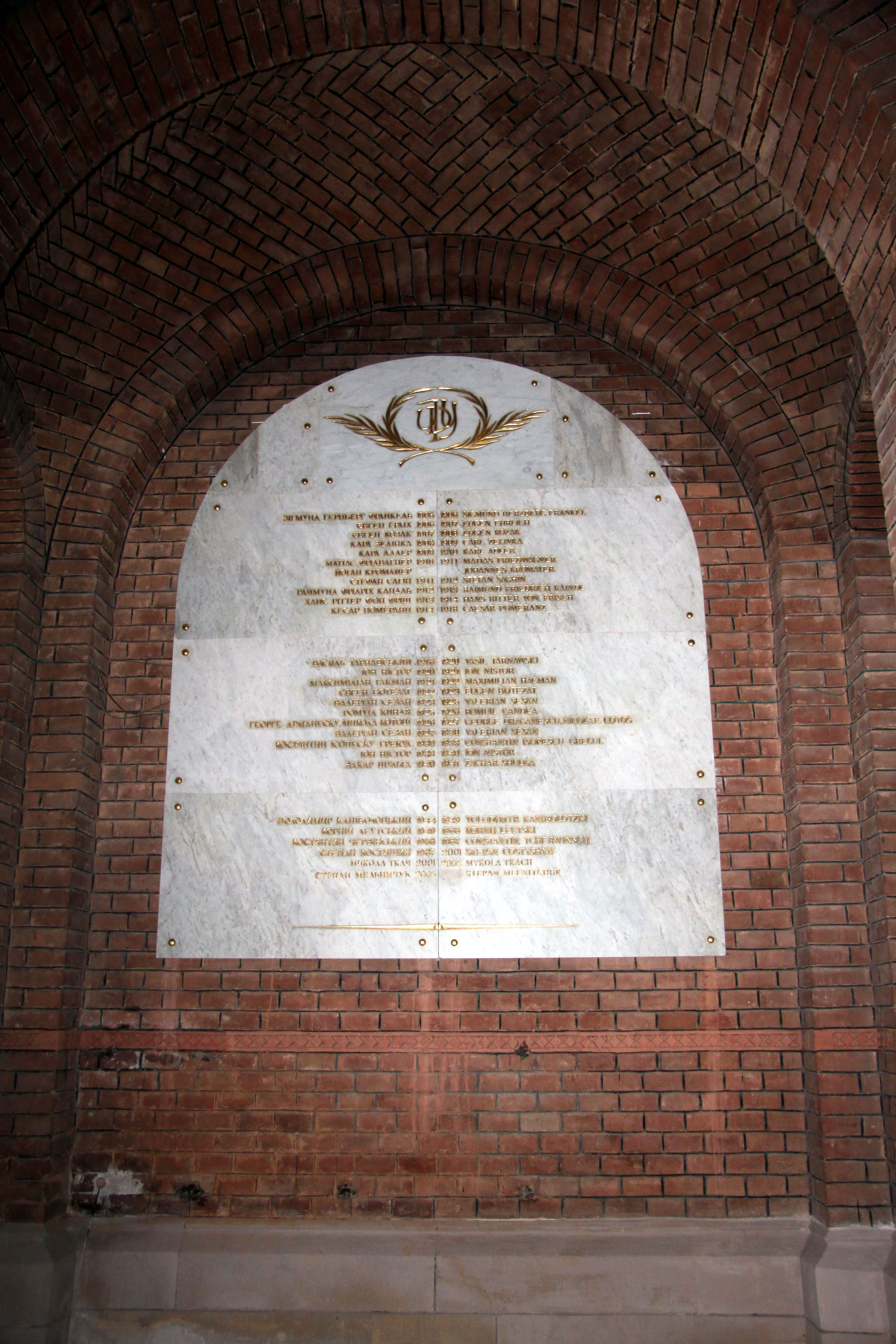
Plaque dedicated to the rectors of the University of Chernivtsi, also mentioning Nicolae Cotos

Born in Straja, in Austrian-ruled Bukovina, he attended high school in Suceava from 1897 to 1905. He then studied at the theology faculty of Czernowitz University from 1905 to 1909, and obtained a doctorate in 1911. Between 1910 and 1914, he took specialty courses in theology at Vienna, Breslau, Tübingen, Bonn, Berlin, Athens and Bucharest. During World War I, he crossed into the Romanian Old Kingdom and volunteered for service in the Romanian Army.

From 1918 to 1919, he was substitute professor at the theological seminary in Chișinău, rising to teaching assistant in 1919. In 1920, he was hired as associate professor at his alma mater, which had become Cernăuți University under the new Romanian administration. Working within the fundamental theology department of the theology faculty, he became a full professor in 1924 and retired in 1941. He also offered courses on the psychology of religion, Christian philosophy and sectology, and for a time was substitute professor in the department of dogmatic and symbolic theology. He was faculty dean three times: 1924-1927, 1935-1937 and 1938-1940, and served as university rector in 1926-1927.

Cotos edited Candela magazine from 1935 to 1938; he also founded and edited Credința, a magazine where numerous articles of his on spiritual guidance appeared. In 1944, upon the definitive integration of Northern Bukovina into the Soviet Union, he settled in Sibiu. In 1951-1952, he was a substitute lecturer on Greek language at the city's theological institute. He died in Sibiu.
