= Sofia Vicoveanca =

Romanian folk singer (born 1941)

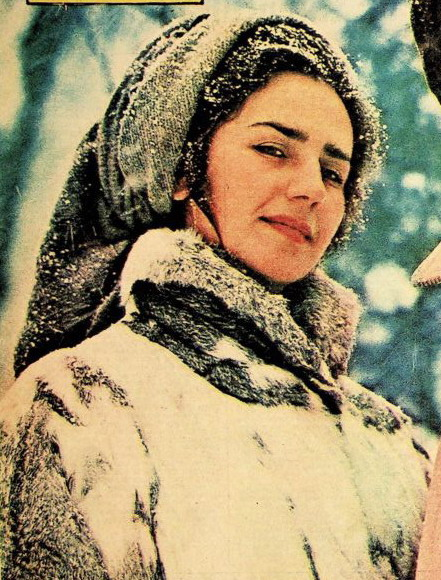
Sofia Vicoveanca in 1983

Sofia Micu (23 September 1941, Toporăuți, Cernăuți County, today in Ukraine), known by her stage name Sofia Vicoveanca (Romanian pronunciation: [ˈsofi.a vikoˈve̯aŋka]), is a Romanian singer of popular music from the historical region of Bucovina.

== Musical career ==
Sofia Vicoveanca was born Sofia Fusa on 23 September 1941 in the commune of Toporăuți (today Toporivtsi), near Cernăuți (today Chernivtsi in Ukraine). She was one of the four children of the merchant Gheorghe Fusa and his wife Veronica.

Her childhood was marked by difficulty, her father being taken prisoner by the Soviets after the annexation of Northern Bucovina by the Soviet Union. She escaped with her mother to the commune of Vicovu de Jos in Suceava County; out of love for the village, she later changed her stage name to Sofia Vicoveanca.

Constrained by the poverty of living as a refugee, the young Sofia learned the traditional crafts of Bucovina. She graduated from the Școala Populară de Artă in Suceava before winning, in 1959, a competition to join the same city's "Ciprian Porumbescu" Ensemble of Song and Dance. In 1965, she released her first album. Since 1998, she has performed as a soloist with Moldavia's foremost folk music orchestra, the Ensemble "Rapsozii Botoșanilor" in Botoșani.

The repertoire of Sofia Vicoveanca includes lullabies, wedding songs, doinas of love and longing, Christmas songs, laments, and ballads, but most of all songs of joy, some of them lightly admonishing or full of the humor of Romanian villages.

In the course of her career, she has released ten solo albums and six collaborations, available on audio cassette, video, and CD. She has given performances around Romania and abroad, touring Israel, Portugal, the United States, France, Denmark, Germany, and former Yugoslavia.

== Prizes and awards ==
In recognition of her nearly fifty years of service to Romanian folk music, Sofia Vicoveanca has been honored with many distinctions, among them: Order of Cultural Merit, fourth class (1973); the Tudor Vladimirescu medal, first class (1975); Order of Cultural Merit, first class (1976); Cross of Faithful Service, third class (2002); and Grand Officer of the Order of Cultural Merit (2004).

She has been awarded the Honorary Citizen award in Suceava, Rădăuți, Siret, Pojorâta, Ciocănești, and Vicov (all in Suceava County), as well as in the commune of Ion Creangă in Neamț County and in Cicârlău, Maramureș County.

== Personal life ==
Sofia Vicoveanca was married to Suceava-based journalist Victor Micu, who died in April 2001 at the age of 70. He had worked for forty years at the newspaper "Zori noi" in Suceava. Together, Sofia and Victor had one son.

== Beyond music ==
Sofia Vicoveanca has played roles in several Romanian films, demonstrating unexpected dramatic talent, and has published two volumes of poetry: Dureri ascunse (1996) and Cu inima-n palme (2004).

A boulevard in Suceava is named after her.
