= Vasile Hutopilă =

Painter (b. 1953)

Vasile Hutopila (Ukrainian: Васи́ль Гутопи́ло; born March 17, 1953, in Izvoarele Sucevei (Ізвори), Suceava County, Bukovina, Romania) is a contemporary Romanian painter of Ukrainian ethnicity. His works belong to impressionism.

== Awards ==
- 1983 - 3rd place at Cântarea României festival - the county final
- May 20, 1985 - 1st place at the Participation, development, peace art festival in Brașov, awarded by the Committee of Socialist Education and Culture of Brașov County
- 1985 - 2nd place at Cântarea României festival - the county final
- 1985 - 2nd place at the most important Romanian arts festival under the communist rule, Cântarea României, in the national final, representing Brașov County
- 1987 - 2nd place in the national final of Cântarea României festival, representing Vaslui County
- 1987 - participation diploma at the Graphic Virtues of the Romanian Landscape national painting exhibition in Constanța
- 1988 - participation diploma at the Graphic Virtues of the Romanian Landscape national painting exhibition in Constanța
- 1989 - participation diploma at the Artur Verona national festival, Dorohoi, Botoșani County
- In May 1997, at the 4th edition of The Bukovinian International Salon of Photography it was awarded the Vasile Hutopilă Special Award to one of the competitors, as a sign of gratitude to the Bukovinian Hutsul painter
- May 7, 2002 - 1st place at The Holy Easter in Bukovina festival, for Byzantine icons, in Câmpulung Moldovenesc, South Bukovina, awarded by the Town Hall
- December 2002 - participation diploma at the exhibition in honour of Câmpulung Moldovenesc being named health resort of national interest, awarded by the Town Hall
- May 9, 2010 - 1st place at Il raduno mongolfiere in Calabria - Estemporanea di pittura, Santo Stefano di Rogliano (CS)

== Exhibitions ==
Some of Vasile Hutopila's exhibitions, from his debut exhibition, in 1975, to the most recent one, in 2003, as part of the important folklore festival Întâlniri bucovinene, which takes part each year in Poland, Romania, Ukraine, Hungary and Germany, reuniting the Poles, Hungarians, Germans, Romanians, Ukrainians, Slovaks, Czechs, Russians, who left from Bukovina and the ones who still live in Bukovina.

- individual exhibitions
- Câmpulung Moldovenesc (1975, 1979, 1981, 1995, 2003), of which, the most important in July 2003, as part of Întâlniri bucovinene / Bukowińskie Spotkania / Буковинські зустрічі festival, at the Wooden Art Museum in Câmpulung Moldovenesc, varnished by prof. dr. Ion Filipciuc, haiku poet
- Brașov (1983, 1984)
- Bucharest (1985)
- Negrești, Vaslui County (1990, 1991, 1992, 1993, 1994)
- Iași (1989)
- group exhibitions
- May 1983, Brașov
- March 1984, Brașov
- December 1986, Anuala '86, Vaslui
- November 28–29, 1987, Virtuți plastice ale peisajului românesc, Constanța; vernissage by prof. Ion Sălișteanu, painter
- December 1987, Anuala '87, Vaslui, at the Arta hall of the Ștefan cel Mare County Museum; vernissage by prof. Ion Sălișteanu, painter
- June 6–12, 1988, Săptămâna culturii și educației socialiste, Negrești
- 1988, Virtuți plastice ale peisajului românesc, Constanța
- December 1988, Anuala '88, Vaslui
- March 21–30, 1989, Decada artelor, Vaslui, vernissage by art critic Valentin Ciucă
- June 5–11, 1989, Săptămâna culturii și educației socialiste, Negrești
- December 1989, Anuala '89, Vaslui, vernissage by art critic Valentin Ciucă
- December 1990, Anuala '90, Vaslui
- December 1992, Anuala '92, Vaslui
- December 1993, Anuala '93, Vaslui
- November 21–27, 1994, Săptămâna culturală a orașului Negrești, Negrești; vernissage by Doina Rotaru
- December 1994, Anuala '94, Vaslui
- October 1–4, 1993, Negrești
- November 29 - December 30, 1997, Salonul de toamnă târzie, Câmpulung Moldovenesc, vernissage by prof. dr. Ion Filipciuc, haiku poet
- May 5–7, 2002, Sărbătoarea Sfintelor Paști în Bucovina, Câmpulung Moldovenesc
- December, 2002, BTT, Câmpulung Moldovenesc
- May 7–9, 2010, Il raduno mongolfiere in Calabria - mostra di pittura, in the historical centre of Santo Stefano di Rogliano (CS)

== What art critics say ==
- Vasile Hutopila's paintings are a serene representation, a victory of the aesthetic truth, equivalent to the humanist love of the universe. Trembling of chromatic intensities, sensitively reduced in tonalities of grey colour in a trajectory of spirituality, of contemporary art. (Ion Vulcan, Bucharest 1987)
- Vasile Hutopila is an abstemious who tends unto the chromatic asceticism and the essence of the purified structures. Situated at the junction between sketch and watercolour, his art is organically unitary and it has an attentively watched colour distribution. (Aurel Leon, Cronica, Iași 21 July 1989, after one of the rare watercolour exhibitions of Hutopilă, who usually uses oil on canvas technique)

== Works in media and books ==
Graphics and cartoons in journals and magazines:

- Oferta, Vaslui
- To be, Câmpulung Moldovenesc
- Gazeta de Câmpulung, Câmpulung Moldovenesc
- Miezul lucrurilor, Câmpulung Moldovenesc

Graphics in books:

- George Ungureanu, Pățania lui Pișpirică, Brașov, 2003
- Alexandru Bogza, Antinomii tonale, Biblioteca Miorița, Câmpulung Moldovenesc, 2006
- Decebal Alexandru Seul, Muntele din beznă, Bacău, 2008

== Mass Media ==
You can see below some of the newspapers, magazines, TV channels and radio stations to which Vasile Hutopilă gave interviews, from the early '80s till present

- newspapers
- Karpatenrundschau, German newspaper in Brașov
- Astra, Brașov
- Drum nou, Brașov
- Clopotul, Botoșani
- Vremea nouă, Vaslui - the most part of the articles on Vasile Hutopilă
- Zori noi, Suceava
- Contemporanul, Bucharest
- Cronica, Iași
- Gazeta de Câmpulung, Câmpulung Moldovenesc
- Crai nou, Suceava
- Monitorul de Suceava, Suceava
- Bucovina, Suceava
- Oferta, Vaslui
- Adevărul, Bucharest
- Evenimentul, Iași
- Mezzoeuro, Cosenza
- Voce ai giovani Catanzaro
- magazines
- Gazeta de Câmpulung - Almanah 2002, Câmpulung Moldovenesc
- Clubul Copiilor și Elevilor 40, Câmpulung Moldovenesc
- TV broadcasting channels
- TVR 1, the Romanian national television channel - 1989
- TVR Iași - 1993, 1994
- Agapia Elgy TV, Câmpulung Moldovenesc - 1995
- radio stations
- Radio Nord 100.7 FM, Câmpulung Moldovenesc - 2004, 2005

== Countries in which there are paintings of Vasile Hutopilă in private collections ==
- France
- Germany
- Greece
- Hungary
- Israel
- Italy
- Japan
- Netherlands
- Norway
- Palestina
- Romania
- Spain
- Switzerland
- United Arab Emirates
- United States of America

== See also ==
- Hutsuls
- a list of Hutsul people
- Bukovina
- impressionism
- Carpathian Mountains
