= Ilișești (river) =

Ilișești Ilișasca
- Location within Romania

Location
- Country: Romania
- Counties: Suceava County
- Villages: Ilișești, Vâlcelele, Costâna

Physical characteristics
- Mouth: Suceava
  - location: Costâna
  - coordinates: 47.6956°N 26.1453°E
- Length: 21 km (13 mi)
- Basin size: 85 km^{2} (33 sq mi)

Basin features
- Progression: Suceava→ Siret→ Danube→ Black Sea
- Tributaries
  - left: Bălăceana
  - right: Știrlivăț

The Ilișești or Ilișasca is a right tributary of the river Suceava in Romania. It discharges into the Suceava in Costâna. Its length is 21 km (13 mi) and its basin size is 85 km^{2} (33 sq mi).
