= Pavel Țugui =

Romanian communist activist and literary historian (1921–2021)

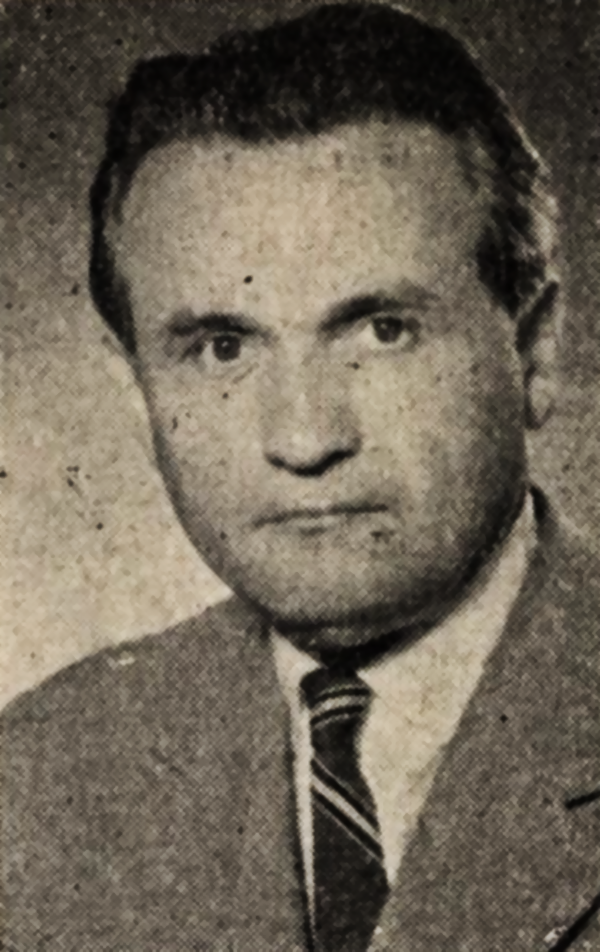
Țugui in 1977

Pavel Țugui (1 November 1921 – 20 September 2021) was a Romanian communist activist and literary historian.

Born in Vicovu de Jos, Rădăuți County (now part of Suceava County), he graduated from high school in Cernăuți, after which he became a teacher. In 1943–1944 he attended military school, and in the fall of 1944 he fought in World War II on the Transylvanian front. Initially a member of the Ploughmen's Front, Țugui joined in July 1945 the Romanian Communist Party (PCR; later PMR). In 1945 he enrolled in the Law School of the University of Iași, but quit after one semester, and in 1947 went to study at the Ștefan Gheorghiu Academy in Bucharest.

Working in the agitation and propaganda section of the Central Committee of the PMR, he advanced between 1955 and 1960 from instructor to head of the literature and arts section to division chief. In the latter capacity, he met many of the writers, artists and scientists of the day, as his office lay at the intersection between the cultural and arts sphere on the one hand and the party leadership on the other. From 1953 to 1955 he was deputy to the Culture Minister, then Constanța Crăciun. Elected an alternate member of the Central Committee at the 7th Party Congress in December 1955, after 1960 he stopped holding important positions in the party or the state.

Țugui also worked as a university professor and literary historian. He had a good knowledge of Bukovina, and wrote several books about the region. He published his memoirs in 1999. In June 2021, he was awarded the Eminescu the Journalist Prize by the Union of the Professional Journalists in Romania. Țugui died in September 2021, at the age of 99.
