= Remeți =

Remeți Ремета
- Commune
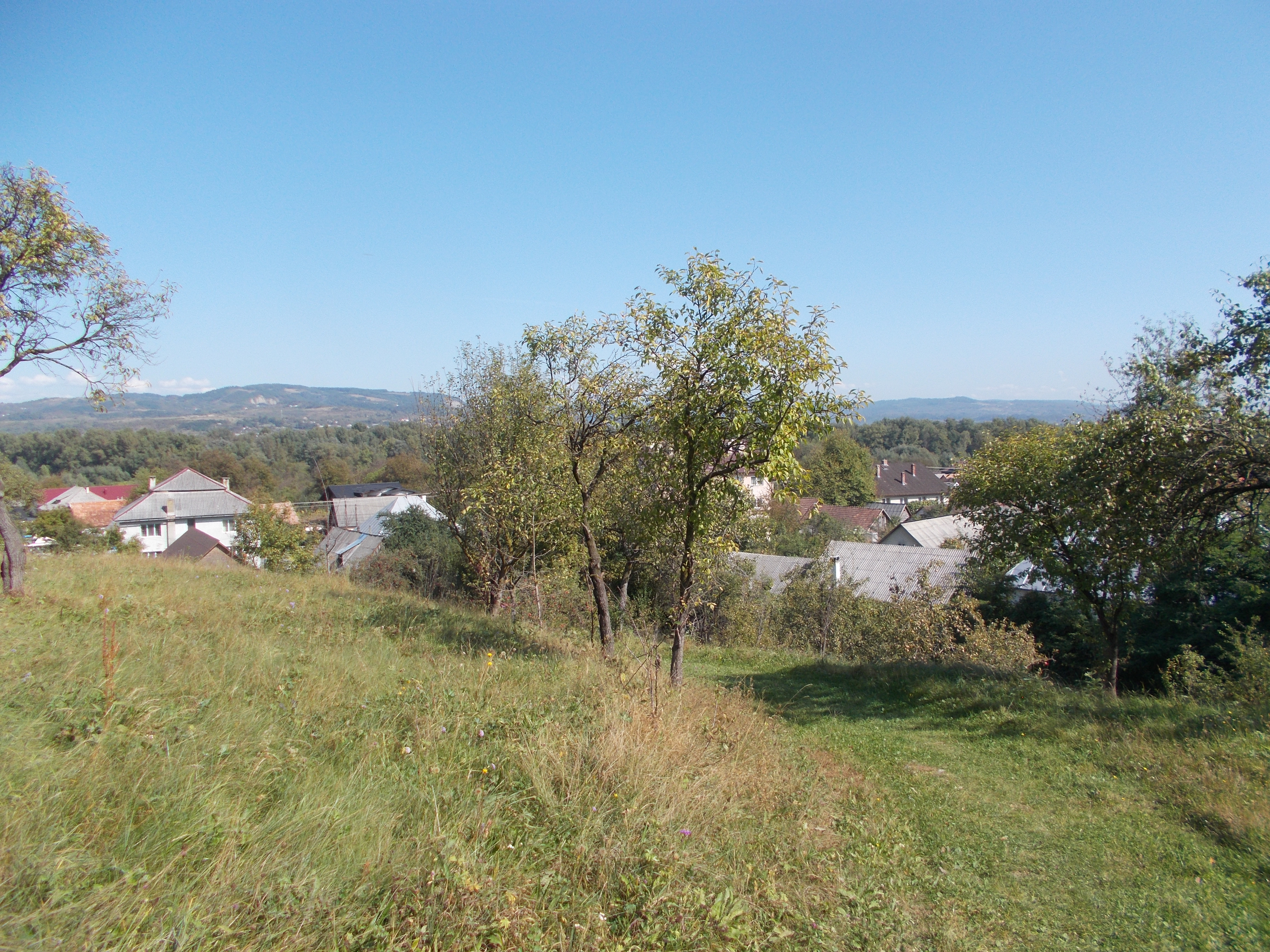
- Remeți

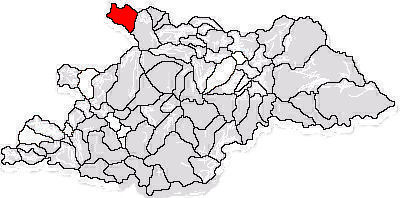
- Location in Maramureș County

- Location in Romania
- Coordinates: 47°59′N 23°38′E
- Country: Romania
- County: Maramureș

Government
  - Mayor (2020–2024): Ivan-Claudiu Brînzanic (UUR)
- Area: 63.4 km^{2} (24.5 sq mi)
- Elevation: 231 m (758 ft)
- Population (2021-12-01): 2,981
  - Density: 47.0/km^{2} (122/sq mi)
- Time zone: UTC+02:00 (EET)
  - Summer (DST): UTC+03:00 (EEST)
- Postal code: 437235
- Area code: +(40) 262
- Vehicle reg.: MM
- Website: comunaremeti.ro

Remeți (Ukrainian: Ремета; Rusyn: Ремети; Hungarian: Pálosremete; German: Remetz; Yiddish: רעמיק, romanized: Remit) is a commune in Maramureș County, Maramureș, Romania. It is composed of three villages: Piatra (Ukrainian: Каминиця; Hungarian: Kövesláz or Ferencvölgye), Remeți, and Teceu Mic (Тячів; Kistécső).

== Geography ==
Remeți is located at the northwestern extremity of Maramureș County, 24 km (15 mi) from Sighetu Marmației and 58 km (36 mi) north of the county seat, Baia Mare, on the border with Satu Mare County and with Ukraine. The commune is situated in the eastern foothills of the Oaș Mountains, a mountain range which is part of the Inner Eastern Carpathians. The Huta Pass is 17 km (11 mi) to the southwest.

The Tisza River flows on the north side of Remeți, marking the Romania–Ukraine border; the city of Tiachiv lies across the river. The river Baia discharges into the Tisza in Remeți.

The commune is traversed by national road DN19, which starts in Oradea, runs through Satu Mare and Negrești-Oaș, traverses the Huta Pass, and ends in Sighetu Marmației.

== Villages ==
The village of Piatra includes the hamlet of Valea lui Francisc, known in German as Franzenthal. This was among the places in Romania where Zipser Germans settled and spoke their dialect of Zipserisch.

== Demographics ==
Historical population
Year	Pop.	±%
1880	1,024	—
1900	1,259	+22.9%
1910	2,251	+78.8%
1930	2,544	+13.0%
1956	2,602	+2.3%
1977	3,003	+15.4%
1992	3,241	+7.9%
2002	3,058	−5.6%
2011	3,040	−0.6%
2021	2,981	−1.9%
Source: Census data

At the 2021 census, the commune had a population of 2,981, of which 70.14% were Ukrainians, 19.05% Romanians, 5.57% were Hungarians, and 1.31% Roma.
