= Caraula (river) =

Caraula Laura
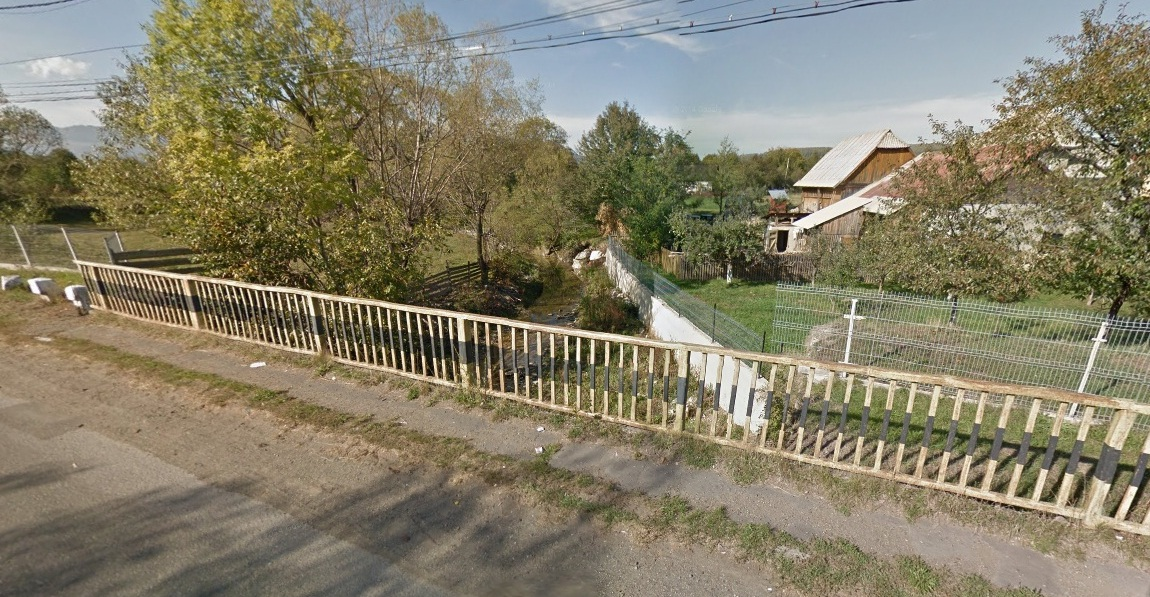

- Location within Romania Location within Chernivtsi Oblast

Location
- Country: Ukraine, Romania
- Counties: Suceava County
- Villages: Vicovu de Sus

Physical characteristics
- Mouth: Suceava
  - location: Vicovu de Sus, Suceava County, Romania
  - coordinates: 47.9205°N 25.6072°E
  - elevation: 485 m (1,591 ft)
- Discharge
  - average: 0.25 m^{3}/s (8.8 cu ft/s)
  - minimum: 0.1 m^{3}/s (3.5 cu ft/s)
  - maximum: 22 m^{3}/s (780 cu ft/s)

Basin features
- Progression: Suceava→ Siret→ Danube→ Black Sea

The Caraula (Ukrainian: Лаура, romanized: Laura) is a left tributary of the river Suceava. Its source is located in Chernivtsi Raion, Chernivtsi Oblast, Ukraine. The river then crosses the border into Romania, joining the Suceava near the village of Vicovu de Sus. In Romania, its length is 4 km (2.5 mi) and its basin size is 4 km^{2} (1.5 sq mi).
