= Grănicești =

- Commune
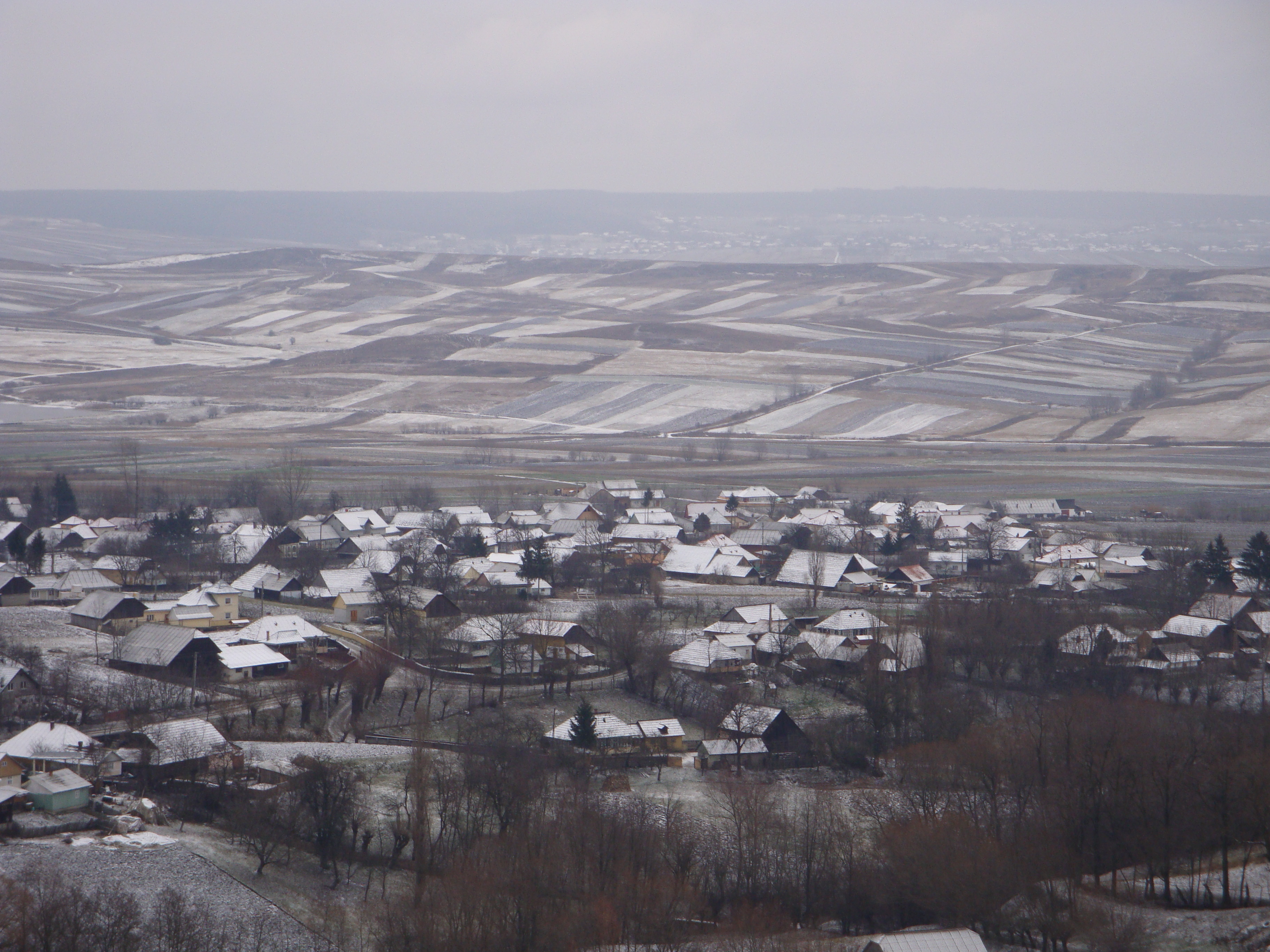
- Grănicești in winter

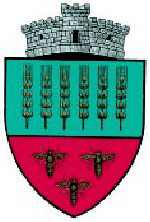
- Coat of arms

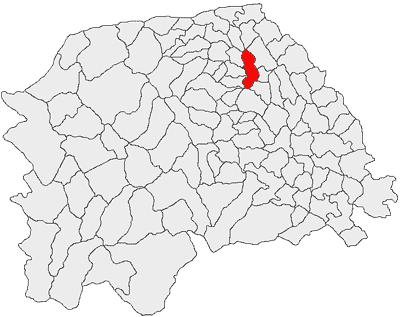
- Location in Suceava County

- Location in Romania
- Coordinates: 47°49′N 26°4′E
- Country: Romania
- County: Suceava
- Subdivisions: Grănicești, Dumbrava, Gura Solcii, Iacobești, Românești, Slobozia Sucevei

Government
  - Mayor (2024–2028): Gheorghe Nuțu (PSD)
- Area: 49 km^{2} (19 sq mi)
- Elevation: 396 m (1,299 ft)
- Population (2021-12-01): 5,263
  - Density: 110/km^{2} (280/sq mi)
- Time zone: UTC+02:00 (EET)
  - Summer (DST): UTC+03:00 (EEST)
- Postal code: 727290
- Area code: (+40) x30
- Vehicle reg.: SV
- Website: comunagranicesti.ro

Grănicești (German: Graniczestie, Hungarian: Krincsest) is a commune located in Suceava County, Bukovina, northeastern Romania.

It is composed of six villages: namely Dumbrava (formerly Găureni), Grănicești, Gura Solcii (German: Gurasolcza), Iacobești (also Jacobeştie-Fogodisten; Hungarian: Fogadjisten; German: Jakobestie), Românești (German: Romanestie), and Slobozia Sucevei. From 1776 to 1941, Iacobești village was inhabited by the Székelys of Bukovina.
