= Obcina Mestecăniș Mountains =

Mountain range in Romania

Coordinates: 47.70°N 25.25°E

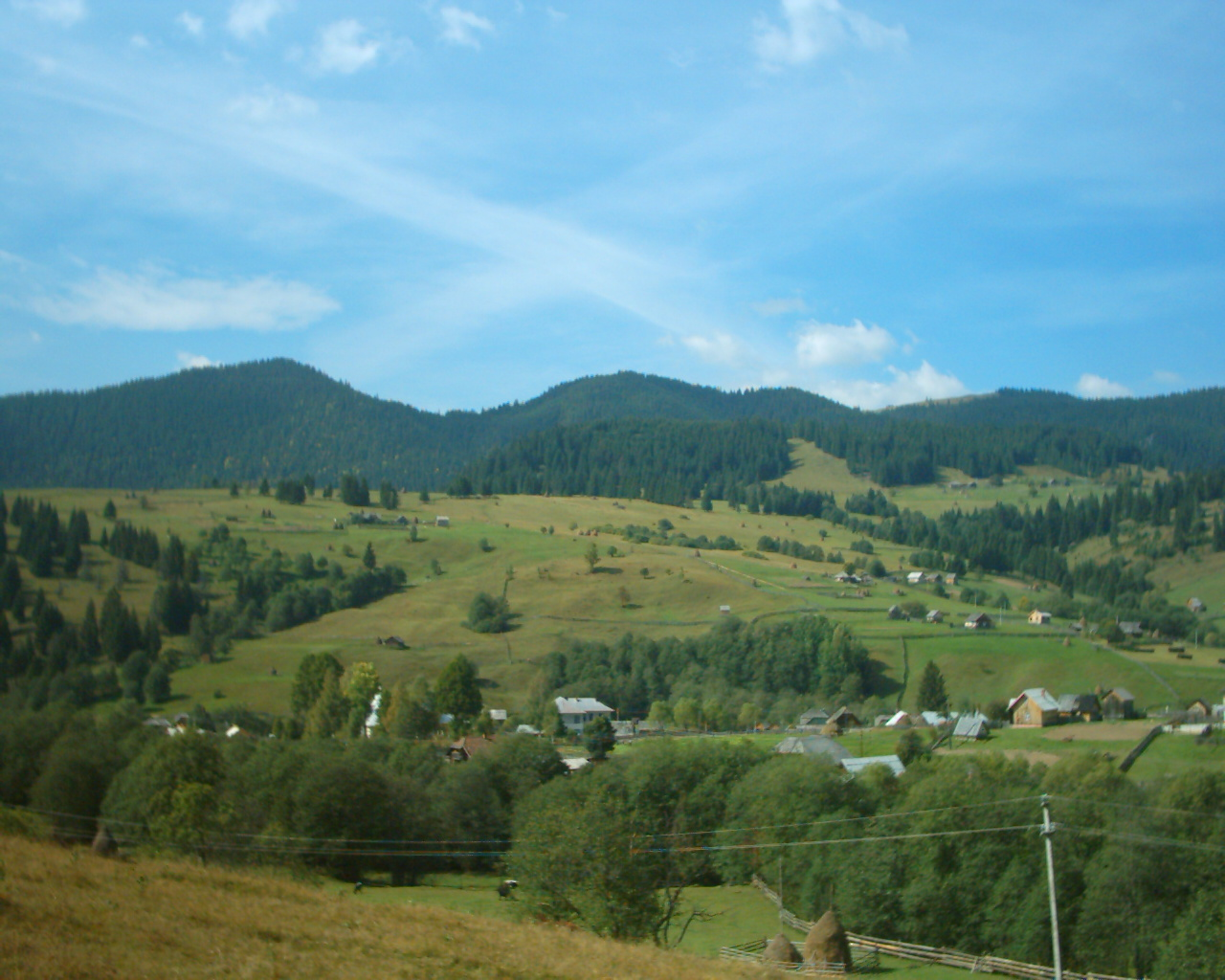
The Obcina Mestecăniș Mountains viewed from Benia, Moldova-Sulița

The Obcina Mestecăniș Ridge is a range of mountains in Romania. Geologically they belong to the Moldavian-Muntenian Carpathians group of the Outer Eastern Carpathians subprovince. Within Romania, however, it is traditional to divide the Eastern Carpathians (Carpații Orientali) into three geographical groups (north, center and south) instead. The Romanian categorization includes Mestecăniș Ridge within the northern Carpathians of Maramureș and Bukovina (Grupa Nordică, Munții Carpați ai Maramureșului și Bucovinei).

The Suceava River emerges from these mountains. The highest peak is Lucina Peak, at 1,588 m (5,210 ft). The mountain range is part of the Ridges of Bukovina (Obcinele Bucovinei).

== See also ==
- Divisions of the Carpathians
