= Dărmănești, Suceava =

Dărmănești German: Hatna
- Commune
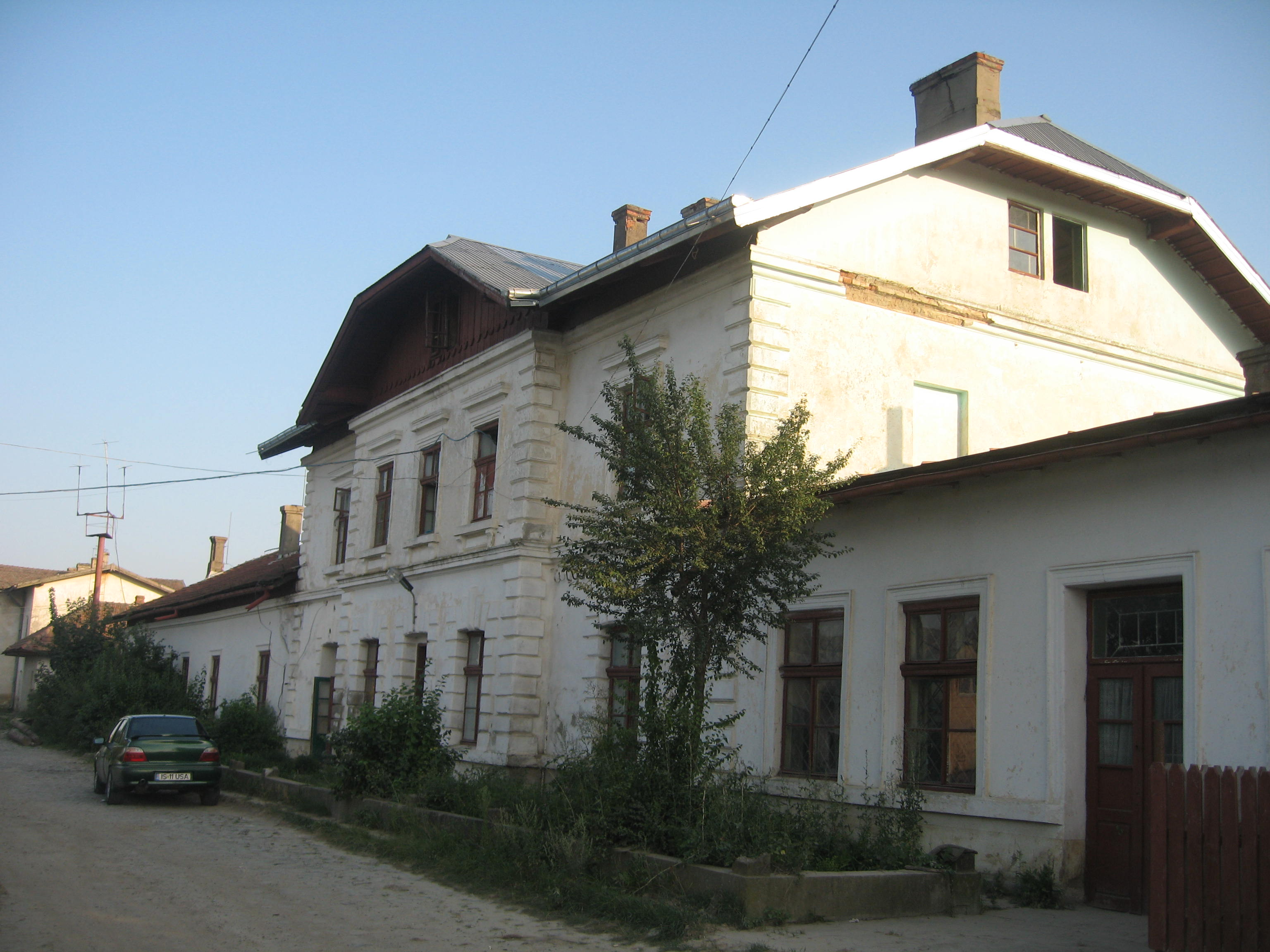
- The old railway station in Dărmănești

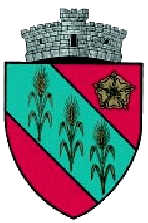
- Coat of arms

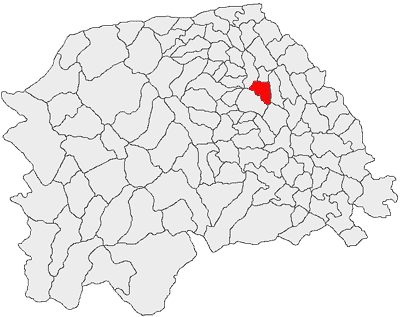
- Location in Suceava County

- Location in Romania
- Coordinates: 47°44′N 26°09′E
- Country: Romania
- County: Suceava
- Subdivisions: Dărmănești, Măriței, Călinești, Călinești-Vasilache, Dănila, Mărițeia Mică

Government
  - Mayor (2024–2028): Dan Chidoveț (PNL)
- Area: 50 km^{2} (19 sq mi)
- Elevation: 326 m (1,070 ft)
- Population (2021-12-01): 4,993
  - Density: 100/km^{2} (260/sq mi)
- Time zone: UTC+02:00 (EET)
  - Summer (DST): UTC+03:00 (EEST)
- Postal code: 727155
- Area code: (+40) x30
- Vehicle reg.: SV
- Website: primariadarmanestisv.ro

Dărmănești (German: Hatna) is a commune located in Suceava County, in the historical region of Bukovina, northeastern Romania.

It is composed of six villages, namely: Călinești (formerly Călinești-Enache; German: Kalinestie Jenacki), Călinești-Vasilache (German: Wasiliki), Dănila (German: Danilla), Dărmănești, Măriței (German: Meretzei) (the commune center), and Mărițeia Mică.

== Gallery ==
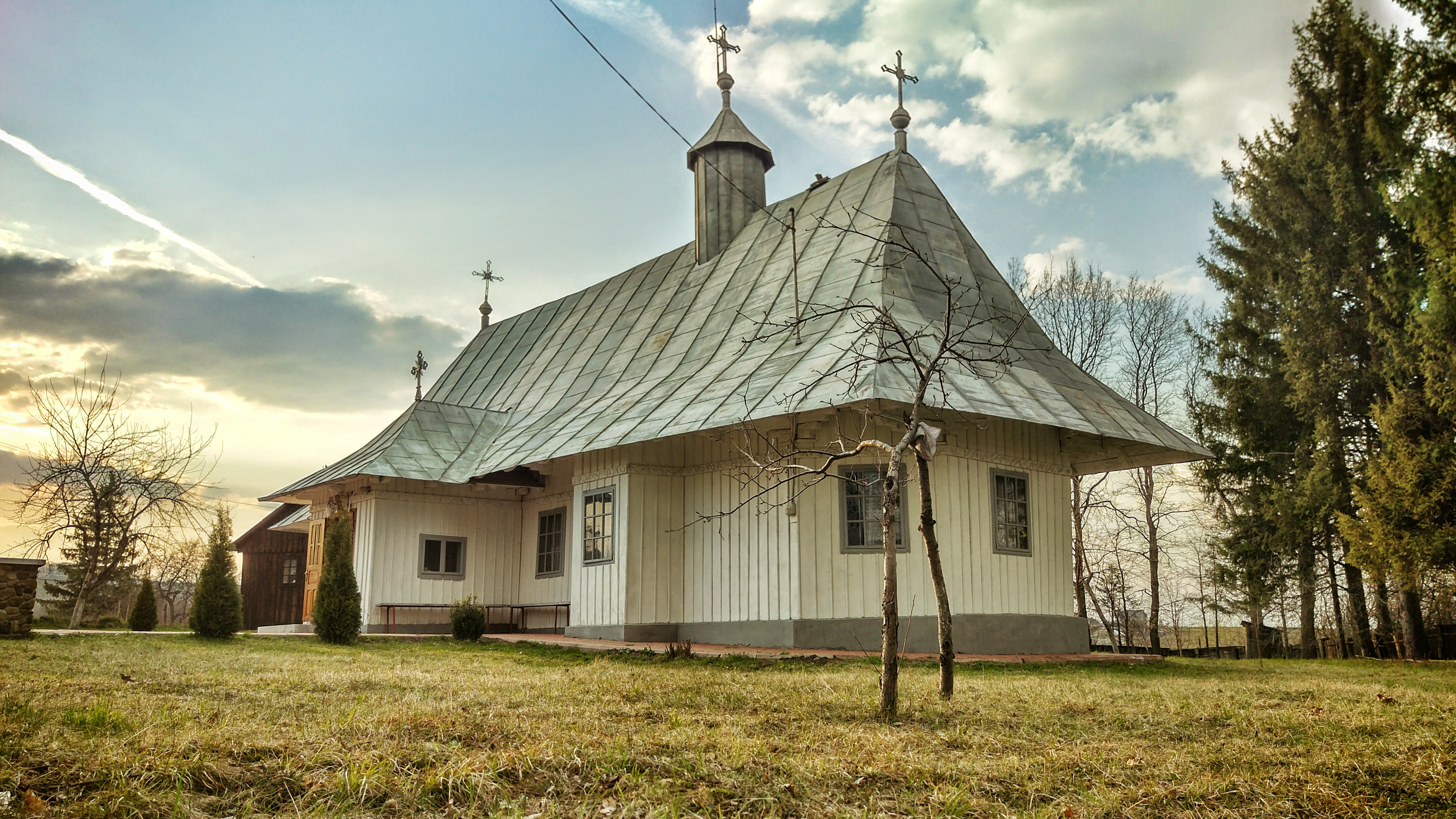
Saint Demetrius wooden church in Călinești-Enache

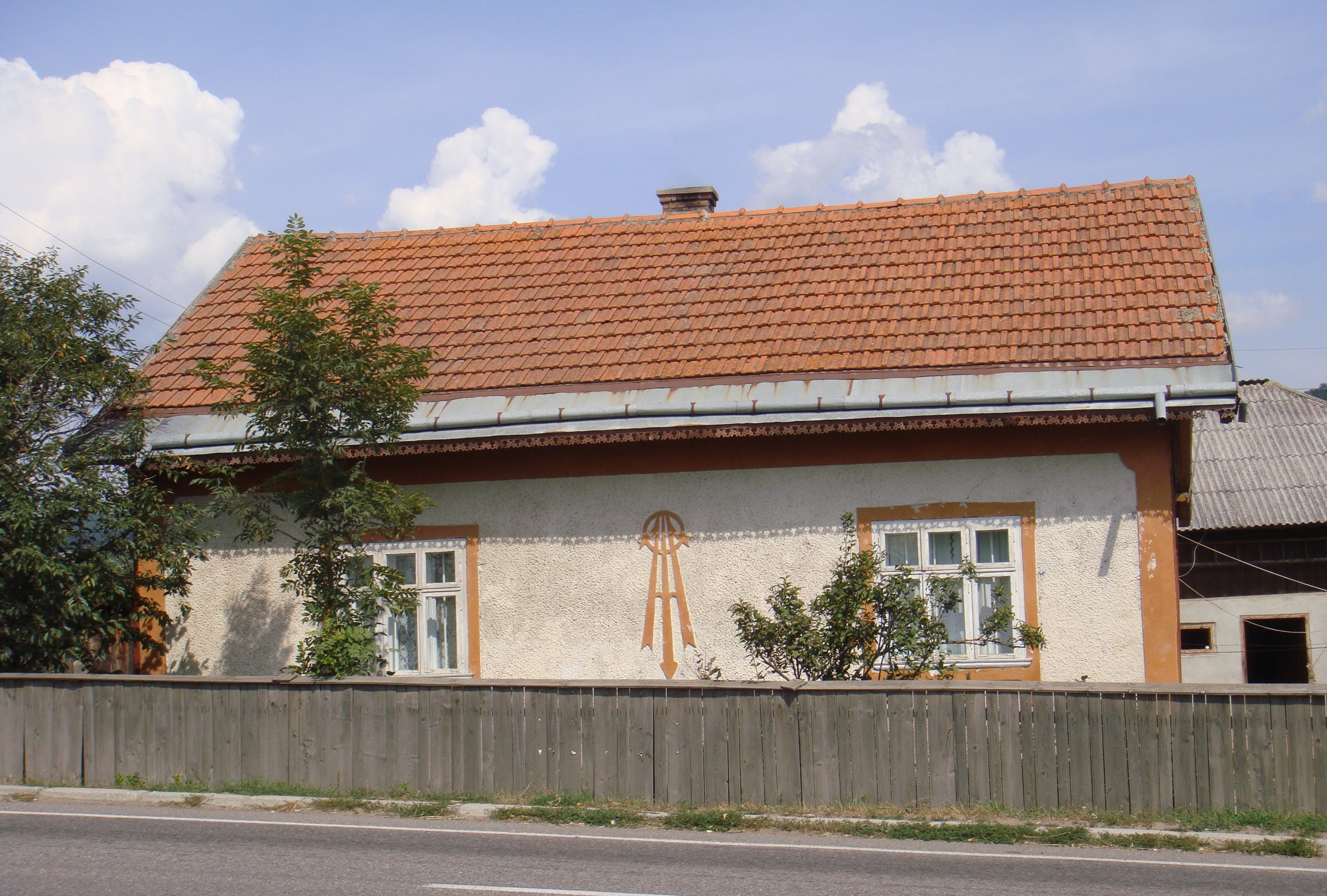
Traditional Romanian house with solar eclipse motif in Dărmănești
