= Gălănești =

- Commune
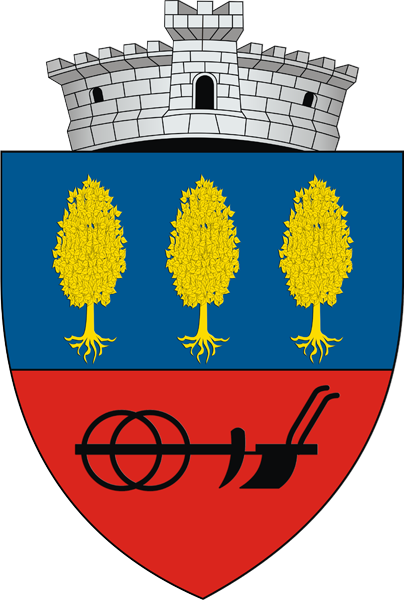
- Coat of arms

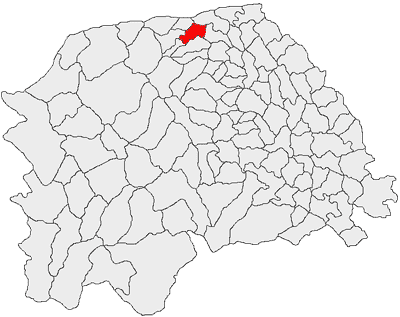
- Location in Suceava County

- Location in Romania
- Coordinates: 47°54′30″N 25°47′30″E
- Country: Romania
- County: Suceava
- Subdivisions: Gălănești, Hurjuieni

Government
  - Mayor (2024–2028): Liviu Mironescu (PSD)
- Area: 41 km^{2} (16 sq mi)
- Elevation: 404 m (1,325 ft)
- Population (2021-12-01): 2,685
  - Density: 65/km^{2} (170/sq mi)
- Time zone: EET/EEST (UTC+2/+3)
- Postal code: 727280
- Area code: (+40) x30
- Vehicle reg.: SV
- Website: galanesti.ro

Gălănești (German: Galanestie) is a commune located in Suceava County, Bukovina, Romania. It is composed of two villages, Gălănești and Hurjuieni. It also included the village of Voitinel until 2004, when it was split off to form a separate commune.
