= Frătăuții Noi =

Frătăuții Noi German: Neu Fratautz
- Commune
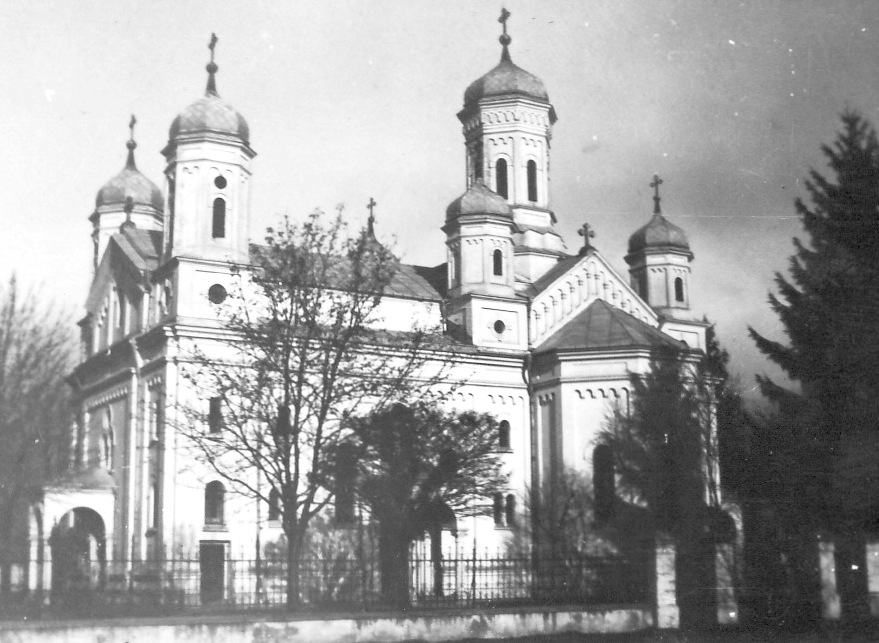
- Church in Frătăuții Noi (image from the archive of the Metropolitan of Moldavia, 1936)

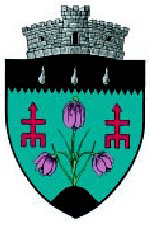
- Coat of arms

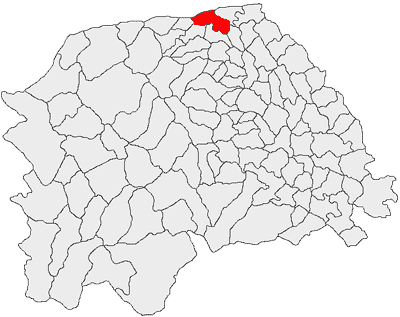
- Location in Suceava County

- Location in Romania
- Coordinates: 47°56′N 25°51′E
- Country: Romania
- County: Suceava
- Subdivisions: Frătăuții Noi, Costișa

Government
  - Mayor (2024–2028): George Olari (PNL)
- Area: 54 km^{2} (21 sq mi)
- Elevation: 408 m (1,339 ft)
- Population (2021-12-01): 5,959
  - Density: 110/km^{2} (290/sq mi)
- Time zone: UTC+02:00 (EET)
  - Summer (DST): UTC+03:00 (EEST)
- Postal code: 727250
- Area code: (+40) x30
- Vehicle reg.: SV
- Website: www.primaria-fratautii-noi.ro

Frătăuții Noi (German: Neu Fratautz or Neufratautz) is a commune located in Suceava County, Bukovina, northeastern Romania. It is composed of two villages, namely Costișa and Frătăuții Noi.

== History ==
Historical affiliations

Moldavia (1388–1775)
Habsburg Monarchy (1775–1804)
Austrian Empire (1804–1867)
Austria-Hungary, Cisleithania (1867–1918)
Kingdom of Romania (1918–1947)
Romanian People's Republic (1947–1965)
Socialist Republic of Romania (1965–1989)
Romania (1989–present)

As it is the case of other rural settlements from Suceava County, Frătăuții Noi (just like Frătăuții Vechi for example) was previously inhabited by a sizeable German community, more specifically by Bukovina Germans (German: Bukowinadeutsche or Buchenlanddeutsche) during the modern period up until the mid 20th century, starting as early as the Habsburg period and, later on, the Austro-Hungarian period.

== Administration and local politics ==
=== Communal council ===
The commune's current local council has the following political composition, according to the results of the 2020 Romanian local elections:

Party	Seats	Current Council
People's Movement Party (PMP)	4	
National Liberal Party (PNL)	3	
Social Democratic Party (PSD)	3	
Save Romania Union (USR)	2	
Christian Democratic National Peasants' Party (PNȚCD)	2	
PRO Romania (PRO)	1	
