= Voitinel =

- Commune
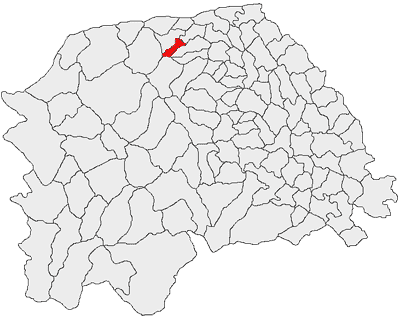
- Location in Suceava County

- Location in Romania
- Coordinates: 47°53′N 25°45′E
- Country: Romania
- County: Suceava

Government
  - Mayor (2024–2028): Maria Pleșca (PSD)
- Area: 24 km^{2} (9 sq mi)
- Elevation: 440 m (1,440 ft)
- Population (2021-12-01): 5,429
  - Density: 230/km^{2} (590/sq mi)
- Time zone: EET/EEST (UTC+2/+3)
- Postal code: 727282
- Area code: (+40) x30
- Vehicle reg.: SV
- Website: www.comunavoitinel.ro

Voitinel (German: Woytinell or Wojtinell) is a commune located in Suceava County, Bukovina, Romania. It is composed of a single village, Voitinel, part of Gălănești commune until 2004.
