= Satu Mare, Suceava =

Satu Mare
- Commune
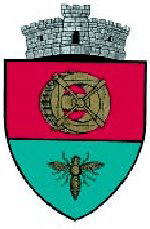
- Coat of arms

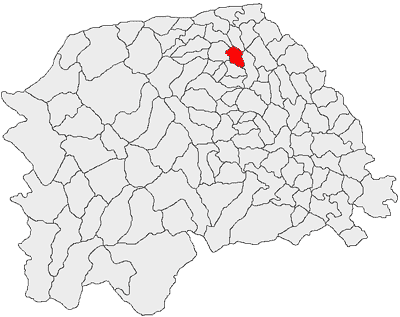
- Location in Suceava County

- Location in Romania
- Coordinates: 47°49′N 26°0′E
- Country: Romania
- County: Suceava
- Subdivisions: Satu Mare, Țibeni

Government
  - Mayor (2024–2028): Toader-Adrian Lavric (PSD)
- Area: 25.42 km^{2} (9.81 sq mi)
- Elevation: 337 m (1,106 ft)
- Population (2021-12-01): 3,232
  - Density: 127.1/km^{2} (329.3/sq mi)
- Time zone: UTC+02:00 (EET)
  - Summer (DST): UTC+03:00 (EEST)
- Postal code: 727480
- Area code: (+40) x30
- Vehicle reg.: SV
- Website: primariasatumaresv.ro

Satu Mare (German: Grossdorf) is a commune located in Suceava County, Bukovina, Romania. It is composed of two villages, Satu Mare (German: Deutsch Satulmare) and Țibeni (Hungarian: Istensegíts; German: Helfgott-Istensegics).

From 1776 to 1941, Țibeni village was inhabited by the Székelys of Bukovina.

Lázár Lovász, the Olympic bronze medal-winning hammer thrower, was born in Țibeni.
