= Ulma, Suceava =

Ulma
- Commune
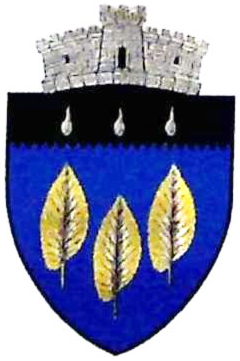
- Coat of arms

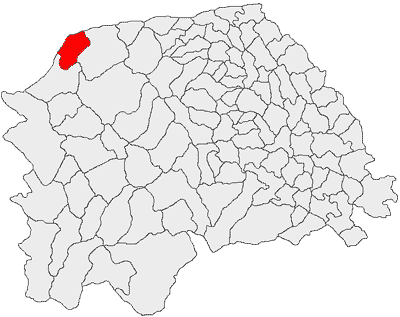
- Location in Suceava County

- Location in Romania
- Coordinates: 47°53′N 25°18′E
- Country: Romania
- County: Suceava
- Subdivisions: Ulma, Costileva, Lupcina, Măgura, Nisipitu

Government
  - Mayor (2024–2028): Nicolae Schipor (PSD)
- Area: 93 km^{2} (36 sq mi)
- Elevation: 700 m (2,300 ft)
- Population (2021-12-01): 1,873
  - Density: 20/km^{2} (52/sq mi)
- Time zone: EET/EEST (UTC+2/+3)
- Postal code: 727555
- Area code: (+40) x30
- Vehicle reg.: SV
- Website: www.comunaulma.ro

Ulma (Ukrainian: Ульма, romanized: Ulma, German: Ulma) is a commune located in Suceava County, in the historical region of Bukovina, northeastern Romania. It is composed of five villages, namely: Costileva, Lupcina, Măgura, Nisipitu, and Ulma.

At the 2011 census, 59.4% of inhabitants were Romanians and 35.1% Ukrainians. At the 2002 census, 99% were Eastern Orthodox.

== Politics and local administration ==
=== Communal council ===
The commune's current local council has the following political composition, according to the results of the 2020 Romanian local elections:

| Party | Seats | Current Council |
|---|---|---|
| National Liberal Party (PNL) | 6 | |
| Union of the Ukrainians of Romania (URR) | 2 | |
| People's Movement Party (PMP) | 2 | |
| Social Democratic Party (PSD) | 1 | |
