= Dolishnii Shepit =

Dolishnii Shepit Долішній Шепіт Șipotele pe Siret
- Village
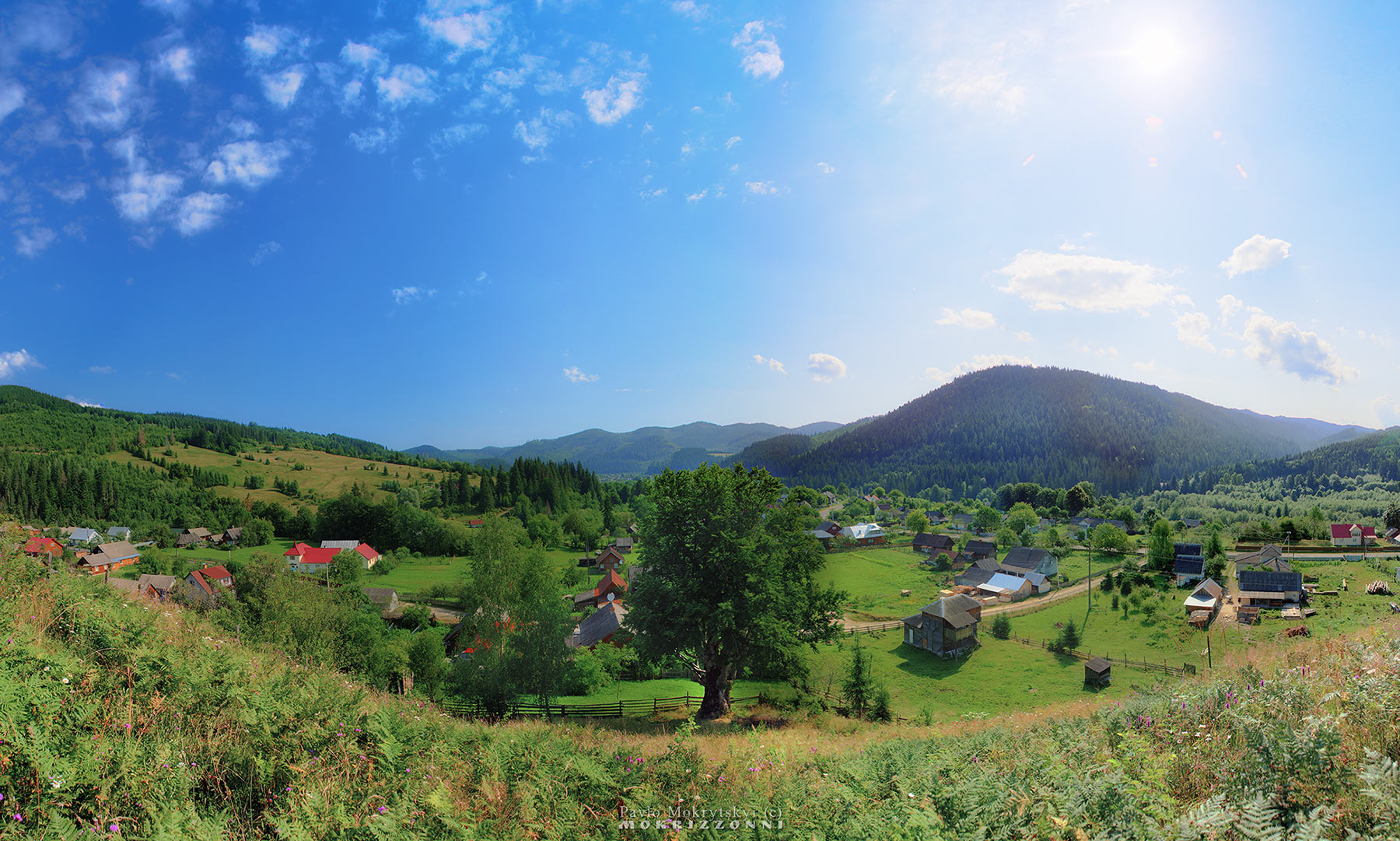
- Panorama of the village
- Interactive map of Dolishnii Shepit
- Location in Chernivtsi Oblast Location in Ukraine
- Coordinates: 48°0′48″N 25°17′17″E
- Country: Ukraine
- Oblast: Chernivtsi Oblast
- Raion: Vyzhnytsia Raion
- Hromada: Berehomet settlement hromada
- Elevation: 671 m (2,201 ft)

Population (2024)
  - Total: 1,495
- Time zone: UTC+2 (EET)
  - Summer (DST): UTC+3 (EEST)
- Postal code: 59240
- Area code: +380 3730
- KOATUU: 7320581501
- KATOTTH: UA73020030050013849

Dolishnii Shepit (Ukrainian: Долішній Шепіт; Romanian: Șipotele pe Siret; German: Schipoth) is a village in Vyzhnytsia Raion, Chernivtsi Oblast, Ukraine. It belongs to Berehomet settlement hromada, one of the hromadas of Ukraine.. Population 1304 (2001), 1495 (2024).
