= Brodina =

- Commune
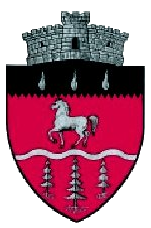
- Coat of arms

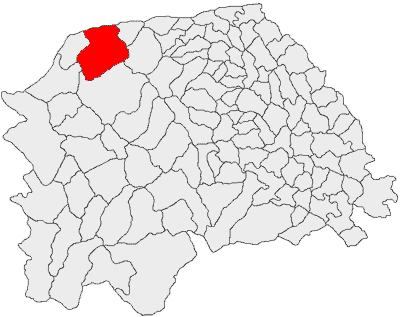
- Location in Suceava County

- Location in Romania
- Coordinates: 47°53′N 25°25′E
- Country: Romania
- County: Suceava

Government
  - Mayor (2020–2024): Vasile Uhliuc (Ind.)
- Area: 192 km^{2} (74 sq mi)
- Elevation: 606 m (1,988 ft)
- Population (2021-12-01): 3,406
  - Density: 18/km^{2} (46/sq mi)
- Time zone: EET/EEST (UTC+2/+3)
- Postal code: 727060
- Area code: (+40) 02 30
- Vehicle reg.: SV
- Website: brodinasv.ro

Brodina is a commune located in Suceava County, Romania. It is composed of ten villages: Brodina, Brodina de Jos, Cununschi, Dubiusca, Ehrește, Falcău, Norocu, Paltin, Sadău, and Zalomestra.

At the 2002 census, 88% of inhabitants were Romanians and 11.4% Ukrainians. 80.2% were Romanian Orthodox, 17% Pentecostal, and 1.2% Roman Catholic.
