= Putna =

Putna can refer to the following places in Romania:

- Putna, Suceava, a commune in Suceava County
- Putna, a village in Prigor Commune, Caraș-Severin County
- Putna, a village in Bolotești Commune, Vrancea County
- Putna Seacă, a village in Garoafa Commune, Vrancea County
- Putna Monastery, in Suceava County
- Putna County, a former county in the interwar Romania, now part of Vrancea County
- Putna (Bistricioara), tributary of the Bistricioara (Siret basin) in Harghita County
- Putna (Moldova), tributary of the Moldova in Suceava County
- Putna, another name for the river Prigor in Caraș-Severin County
- Putna (Siret), tributary of the Siret in Vrancea County
- Putna (Suceava), tributary of the Suceava in Suceava County
- Putna, alternative name of the upper reach of the river Borzontul Mare

== See also ==
- Putna (surname)
- Putana (disambiguation)
