= Putnișoara =

- Location within Romania

Location
- Country: Romania
- Counties: Suceava County
- Villages: Putna

Physical characteristics
- Source: Obcina Mare Mountains
- Mouth: Putna
  - location: Putna
  - coordinates: 47.8645°N 25.6079°E
- Length: 11 km (6.8 mi)
- Basin size: 38 km^{2} (15 sq mi)

Basin features
- Progression: Putna→ Suceava→ Siret→ Danube→ Black Sea
- Tributaries
  - right: Strujinoasa

The Putnișoara is a right tributary of the river Putna (Suceava basin) in Suceava County, Romania. It discharges into the Putna in the village Putna. Its length is 11 km (6.8 mi) and its basin size is 38 km^{2} (15 sq mi).
