= Iablacina =

Iablacina Brezovița
- Location within Romania

Location
- Country: Romania
- Counties: Caraș-Severin County
- Villages: Borlovenii Noi, Prigor

Physical characteristics
- Mouth: Prigor
  - location: Prigor
  - coordinates: 44.9240°N 22.1336°E
- Length: 17 km (11 mi)
- Basin size: 58 km^{2} (22 sq mi)

Basin features
- Progression: Prigor→ Nera→ Danube→ Black Sea
- Tributaries
  - left: Țerova, Șumiṭa

The Iablacina (also: Brezovița) is a right tributary of the river Prigor in Romania. It discharges into the Prigor near the village Prigor. Its length is 17 km (11 mi) and its basin size is 58 km^{2} (22 sq mi).
