= Daniil Sihastrul =

Romanian saint

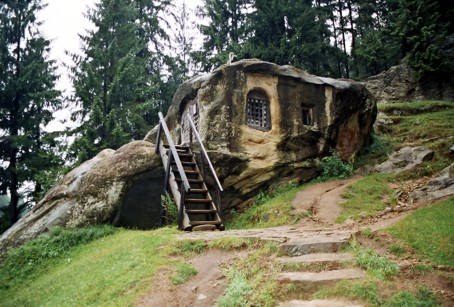
Daniil's cave near Putna, Suceava

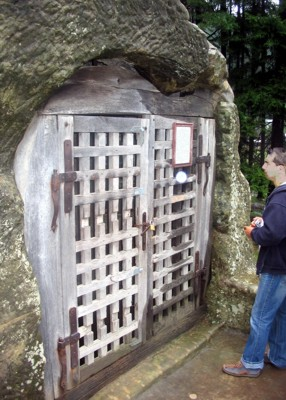
Entrance to Daniil's cave

Daniil Sihastrul (Romanian for "Daniel the Hesychast") (died 1496) was a renowned Moldavan Orthodox spiritual guide, advisor of Stephen the Great, and hegumen of Voroneț Monastery. Canonized by the Romanian Orthodox Church in 1992, he is commemorated on December 18.

== Biography ==
A contemporary of Stephen the Great (1457-1504), Daniil Sihastrul was born near the beginning of the 15th century in a village near Rădăuți, with the baptismal name Dumitru. At 16 he was tonsured as a monk with the name of David at Bogdana Monastery in Rădăuți.

Some time later, he retreated to the "Sfântul Laurențiu" Monastery near the village of Vicovu de Sus. Feeling the need for greater solitude, he took upon himself the Great Schema, taking the schematic name of Daniil, and retreating into a densely forested area of the Vițău valley near modern-day Putna. There he found a rock into which he carved a chapel. To this day one can see the narthex, naos, and altar, as well as an underground room, also carved out of the rock, in which the saint dwelled. Stephen the Great came here in 1451, after the assassination of his father Bogdan II, at Reuseni. Daniil prophesied that Stephen would return and would become the ruler of Moldavia, which did occur in 1457.

At the urging of Daniil Sihastrul, Stephen the Great built Putna Monastery in 1466. After its consecration in 1470, Daniil withdrew to Voroneț, on the banks of the Voroneț River, by Șoimului Rock, where he continued his monastic life.

At Voroneț he was again visited by Stephen the Great, after the Battle of Valea Albă in 1476, seeking advice. Daniil Sihastrul advised him to continue battling the Turks, foreseeing that he would triumph. To commemorate this victory in 1488 the ruler commissioned the Voroneț Monastery. After its consecration, Daniil moved from his hermitage to the monastery. He spent the latter part of his life here, being elected as hegumen. He died in 1496 and was buried in the church at the Voroneț Monastery. On his tomb stone, carved according to the wishes of Stephen the Great, it is written: "This is the tomb of our father David, the schema-monk Daniil".

== Legacy ==
Daniil Sihastrul ignited a hermit movement in northern Moldova, having many novices in the forest surrounding Voroneț, as well as at the hermitages and monasteries in its surroundings. He encouraged Stephen the Great to fight for the defense of Christendom and to build holy places.

He has been considered a saint ever since his life time, being credited with healing the sick, exorcising demons, and removing suffering.
