= Prigor (river) =

- Location within Romania

Location
- Country: Romania
- Counties: Caraș-Severin County
- Villages: Putna, Prigor

Physical characteristics
- Mouth: Nera
  - coordinates: 44.9365°N 22.0846°E
- Length: 33 km (21 mi)
- Basin size: 153 km^{2} (59 sq mi)

Basin features
- Progression: Nera→ Danube→ Black Sea
- Tributaries
  - right: Iablacina

The Prigor (in its upper course also: Putna) is a left tributary of the river Nera in Romania. It discharges into the Nera near the village Prigor. Its length is 33 km (21 mi) and its basin size is 153 km^{2} (59 sq mi).
