= Voroneț Monastery =

Monastery in Suceava County, Romania

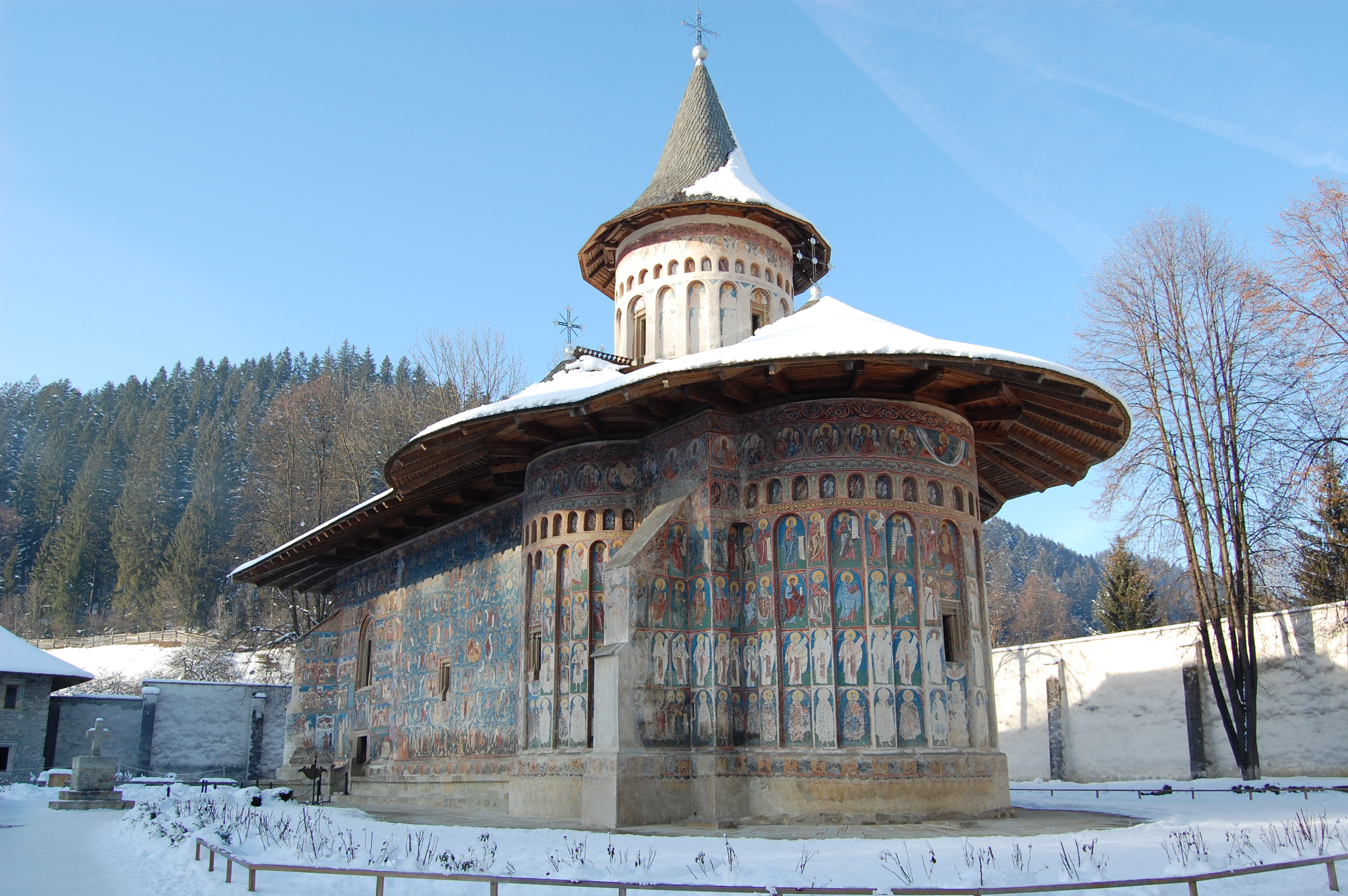
- Interactive map of Voroneț Monastery

Monastery information
- Full name: Voroneț Monastery
- Other name: Sistine Chapel of the East
- Order: Romanian Orthodox
- Established: 1488
- Dedication: Saint George

People
- Founder: Stephen the Great of Moldavia

Architecture
- Style: Moldavian
- Completion date: 14 September 1488

Site
- Location: 6 km (3.7 mi) from Voroneț, Suceava County, Romania
- Coordinates: 47°31′1.56″N 25°51′51.3″E
- Visible remains: Church
- Public access: Yes
- Other information

UNESCO World Heritage Site
- Part of: Churches of Moldavia
- Criteria: Cultural: (i), (iv)
- Reference: 598
- Inscription: 1993 (17th Session)

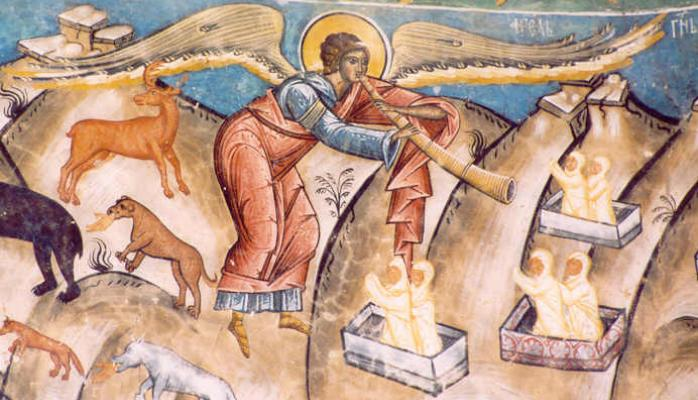
Angel of the Last Judgment

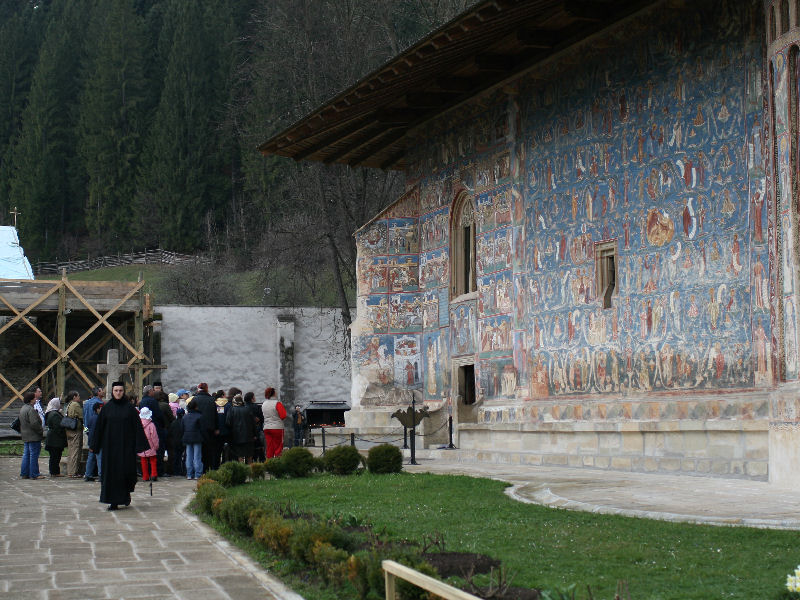
Visitors at the Monastery

The Voroneț Monastery is a medieval monastery in the Romanian village of Voroneț, now a part of the town Gura Humorului. It is one of the famous painted monasteries from southern Bukovina, in Suceava County. The monastery was constructed by Stephen the Great in 1488 over a period of 3 months and 3 weeks to commemorate the victory at Battle of Vaslui. Often known as the "Sistine Chapel of the East" for its vivid frescoes, Voroneț's walls feature an intense shade of blue known in Romania as "Voroneț blue."

The monastery is located to the south of Gura Humorului in Suceava County, in the valley of the Voroneț River. The legend of the origin of the church unites two men central to Romanian history: the founder of the monastery, Stephen the Great, and Saint Daniil the Hermit, the first abbot of the monastery. The tomb of Saint Daniil is located within the monastery.

The church is one of the Painted churches of Moldavia listed in UNESCO's list of World Heritage Sites.

== History ==
The age of the monastic site is not known. A legend tells us that Stephen the Great, in a moment of crisis during a war against the Ottoman Turks, came to Daniel the Hermit at his skete in Voroneț and asked for advice. Daniel told him not to surrender the fight. Then, after victory, he must build a monastery dedicated to Saint George. The original entrance above the Church of Saint George, now in the exonarthex, bears the inscription:

I, Voivode Stephen, by the Grace of God Ruler of Moldavia, son of Bogdan, have started to have the monastery of Voroneț built to the glory of the holy and well-known St George, the great and victorious martyr, in 6996 in May on 26, on one day of Monday, after the Pentecost and I had it finished the same year, in September, 1488.

The church was built on a triconch plan (with three apses), with a chancel, a naos with its tower, and a pronaos.

In 1547, the Metropolitan Bishop of Moldavia Grigorie Roșca added the exonarthex to the west end of the church and had the exterior walls painted. His contribution is recorded on the left of the entrance door:

By the Will of the Father and the Help of the Son and the accomplishment of the Holy Spirit and by the great pains taken by the faithful Kir Grigorie, Metropolitan of the whole Moldavian Country, there was added this title porch and the exterior of the whole church was painted, for the sake of his soul, in 7055 (1547).

The monastery contains tombstones commemorating Saint Daniel the Hermit, Grigorie Roșca, and other patrons of the church and noblemen.

Voroneţ was known for its school of calligraphy, where priests, monks and friars learned to read, write and translate religious texts. The school produced two notable copies of Romanian translations of the Bible: The Codex of Voroneț, discovered in 1871, and The Psalter of Voroneț, found in 1882. These books are now held at the Romanian Academy.

The monastery was deserted soon after 1775, when the Habsburg monarchy annexed the northern part of Moldavia. The monastic community returned to Voroneț in 1991. Since their return, those living in the monastery have constructed housing for the resident nuns, a chapel, fountains, stables, barns, and a house for pilgrims.

== Church ==
The katholikon (main church) of Saint George at Voroneț Monastery is possibly the most famous church in Romania. It is known throughout the world for its exterior frescoes of bright and intense colours, and for the hundreds of well-preserved figures placed against the renowned azurite background. The small windows, their rectangular frames of crossed rods and the receding pointed or shouldered arches of the interior doorframes are Gothic. The south and north doors of the exonarthex of 1547 have rectangular frames, which indicate a transition period from Gothic to Renaissance. But, above them, on each wall is a tall window with a flamboyant Gothic arch. The whole west façade is without any openings, which indicates that the intention of the Metropolitan Roșca was from the beginning to reserve it for frescoes.

On the north façade is still visible the original decoration of the church, the rows of ceramic enamelled discs in yellow, brown and green, decorated in relief. These include heraldic motifs, such as the rampant lion and the aurochs' head of the Moldavian coat of arms, and creatures inspired by Western European mediaeval literature, such as two-tailed mermaids. The tower is decorated with sixteen tall niches, in four of which are windows. A row of small niches encircles the tower above them. The fragmented roof probably follows the shape of the original roof, which doubtless was made with shingles.

== Images ==
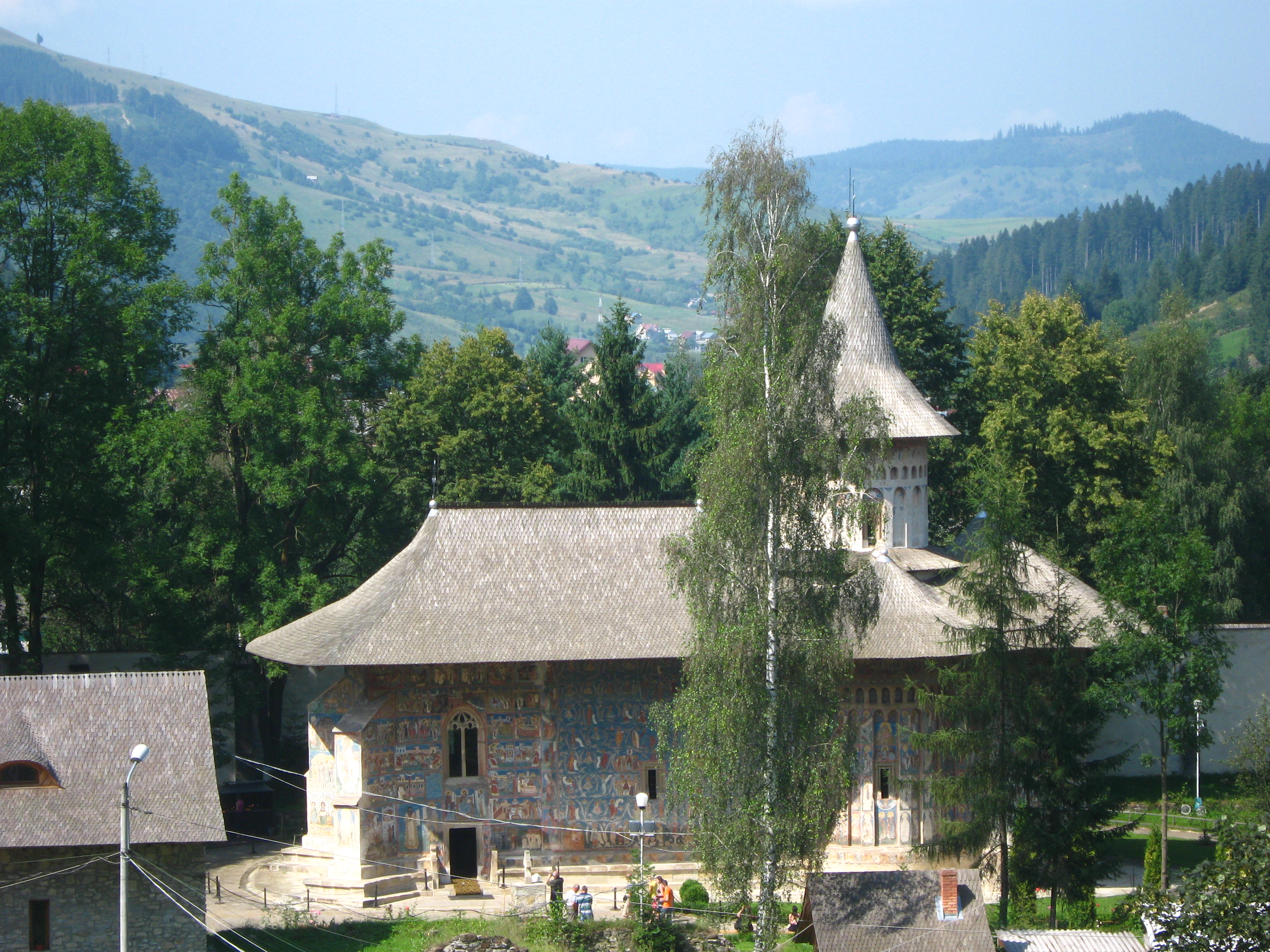
The Church of Saint George within Voroneț Monastery

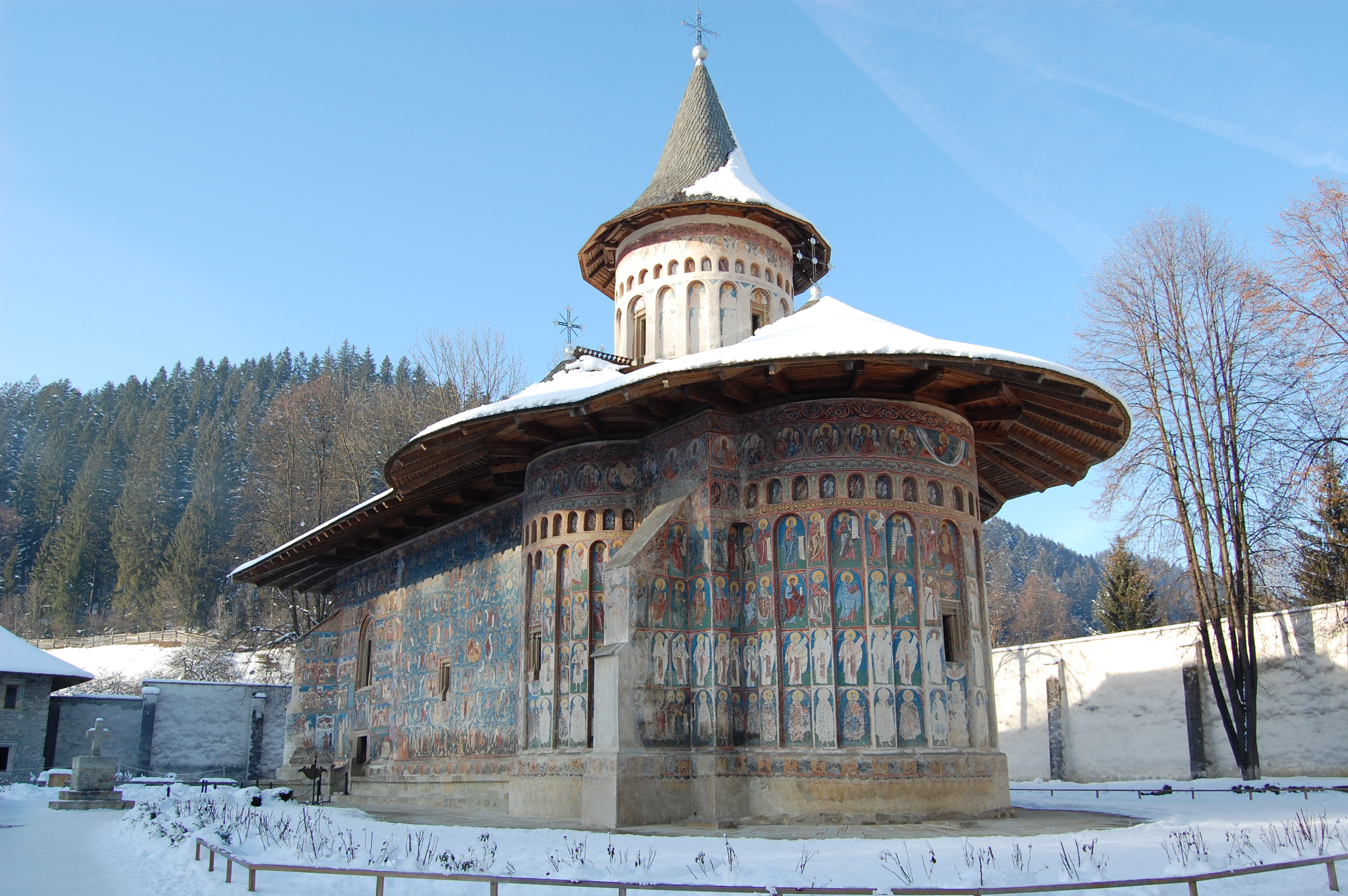
The Church of Saint George

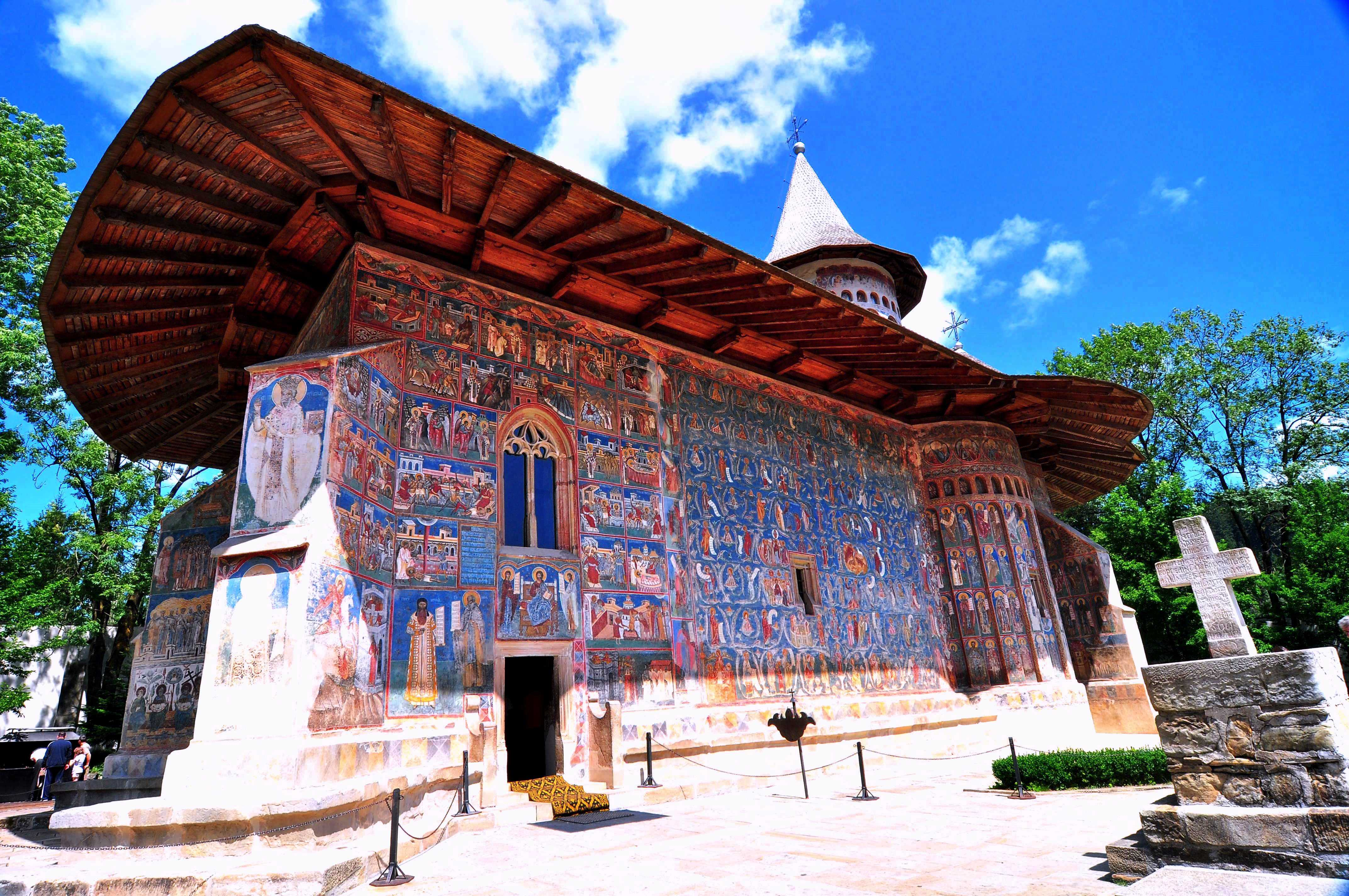
The Church of Saint George

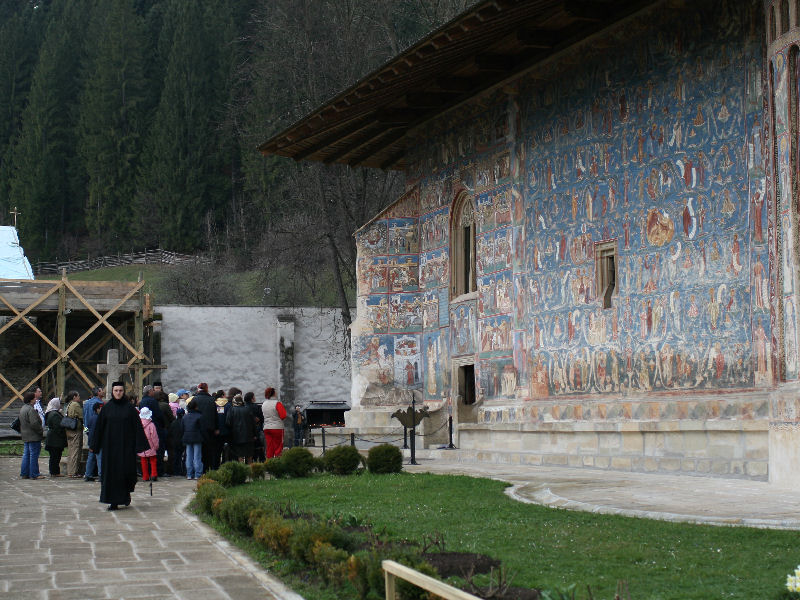
Exterior picture of the southern walls of the church

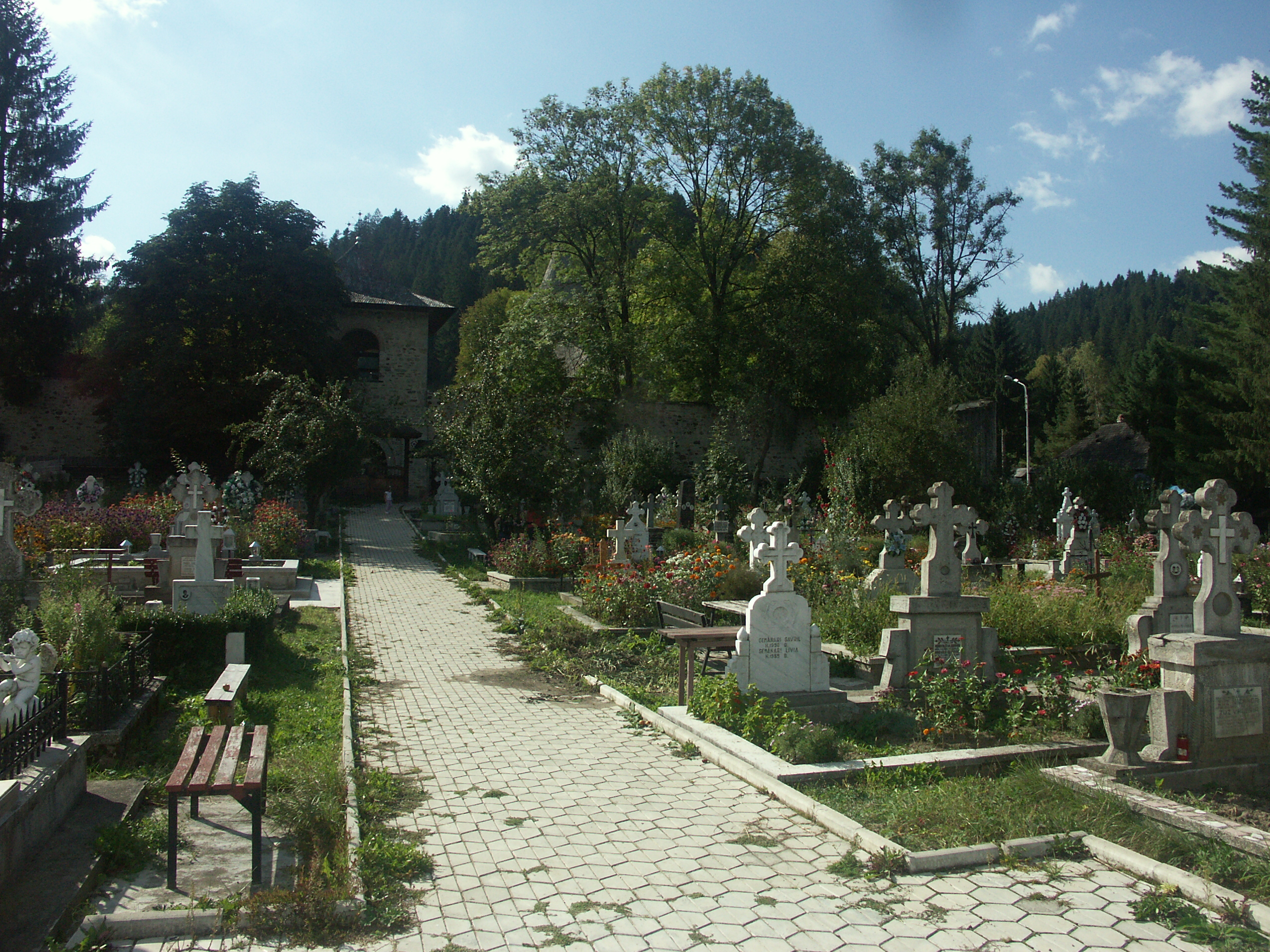
Interior court of the complex

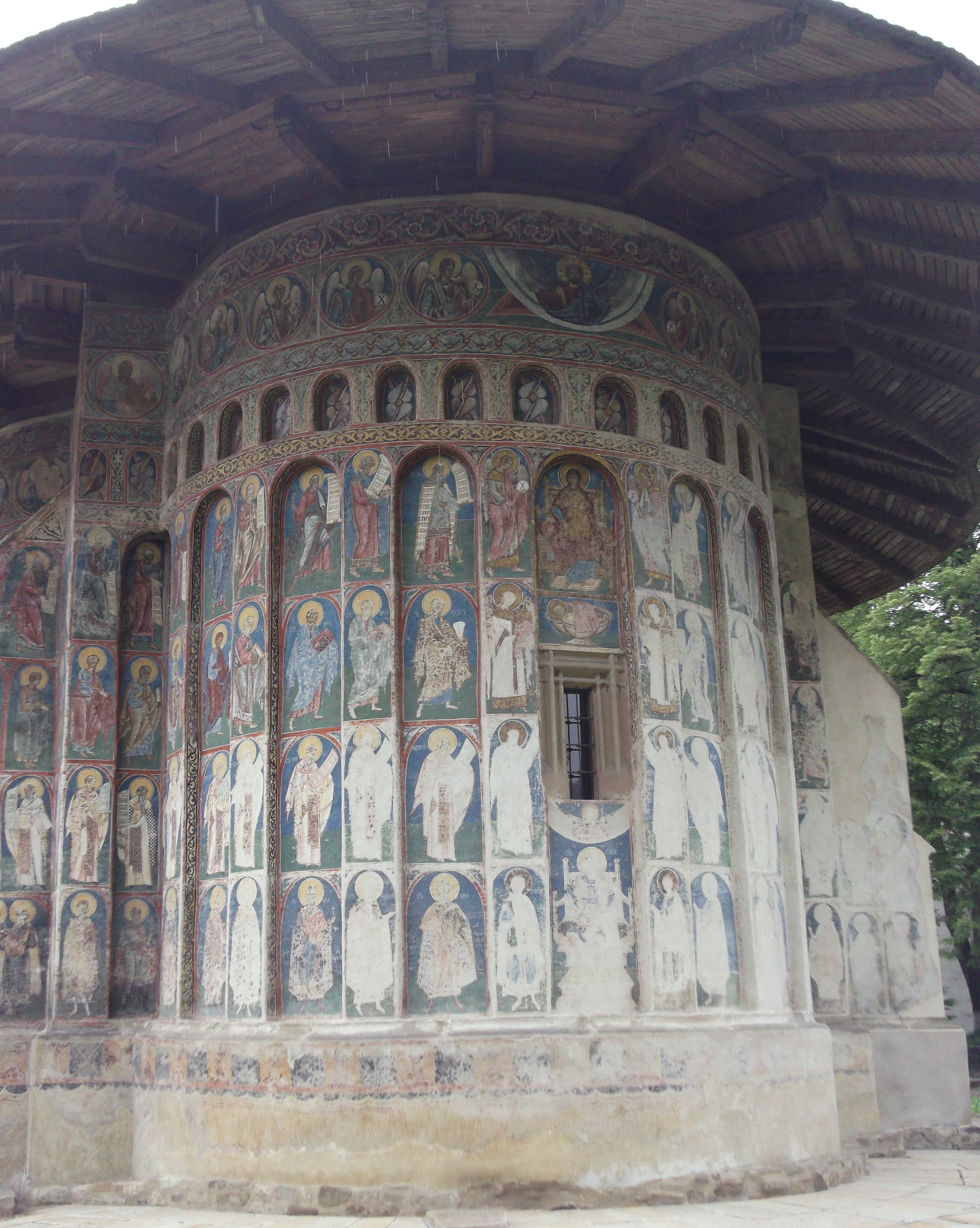
Exterior picture of the altar

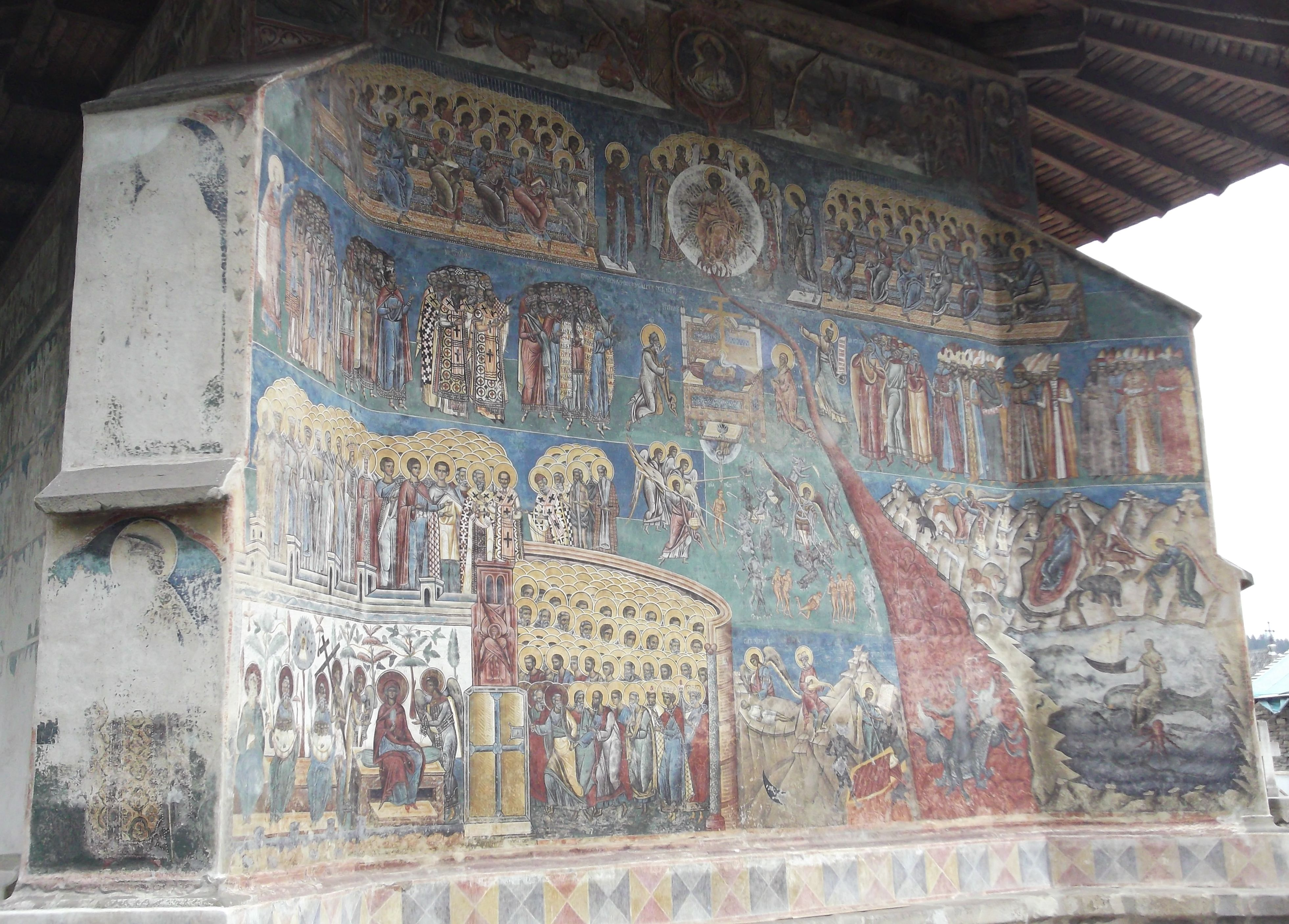
Exterior picture of the western walls

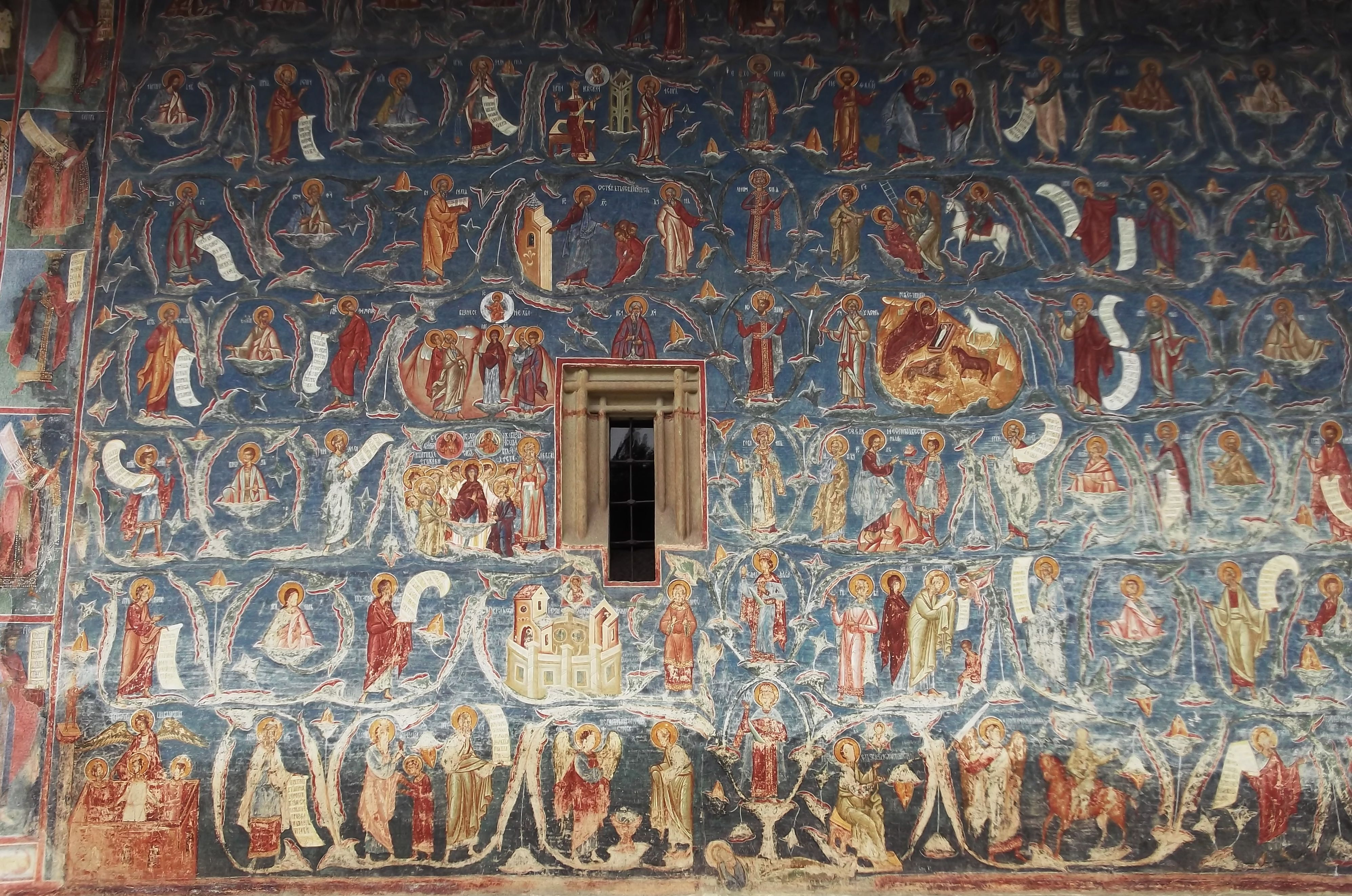
Exterior picture — detail

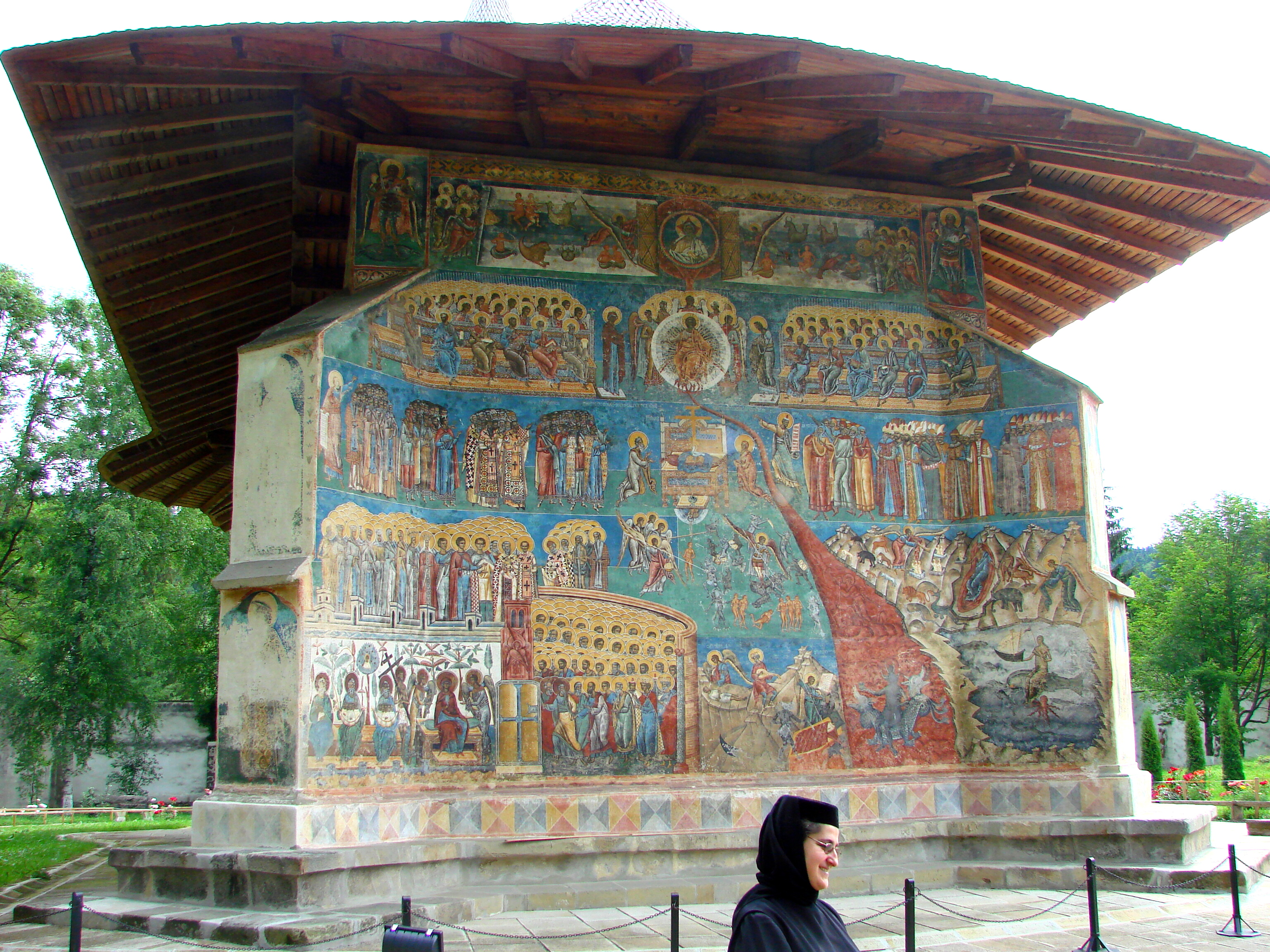
The Last Judgment, painted on the exterior of the Church of St. George

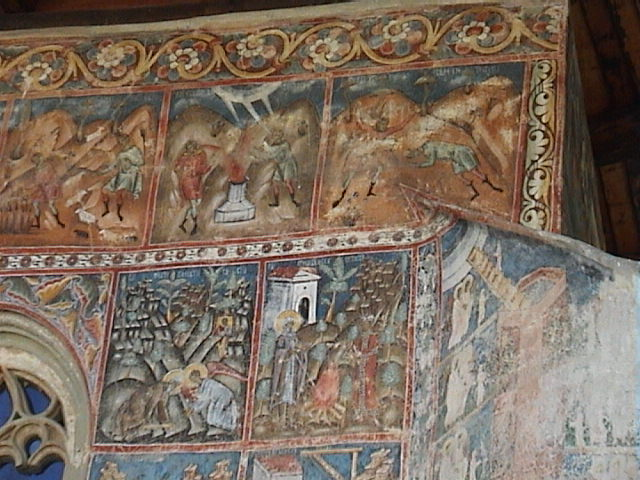
Cain and Abel, (bottom) lives of saints

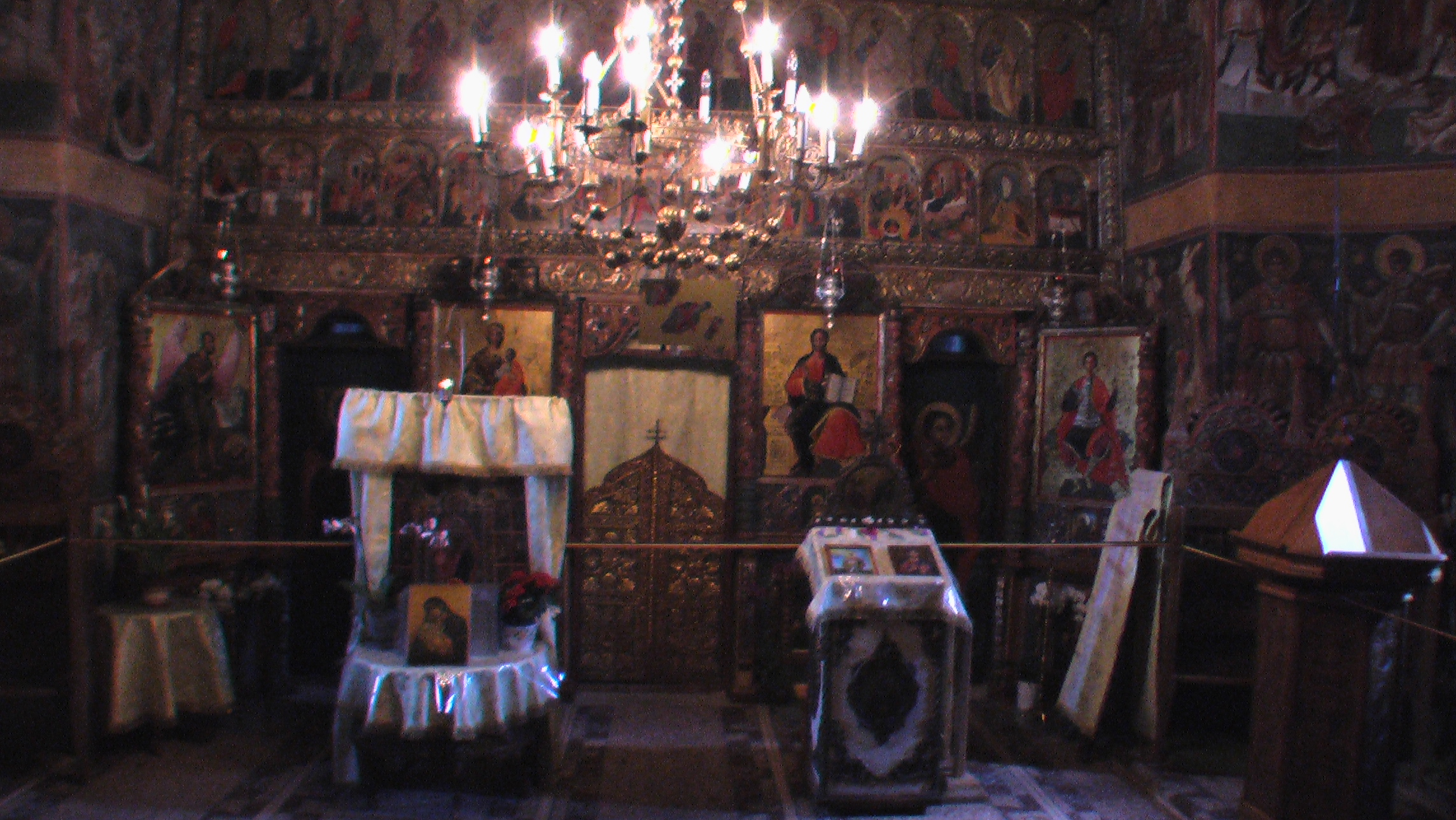

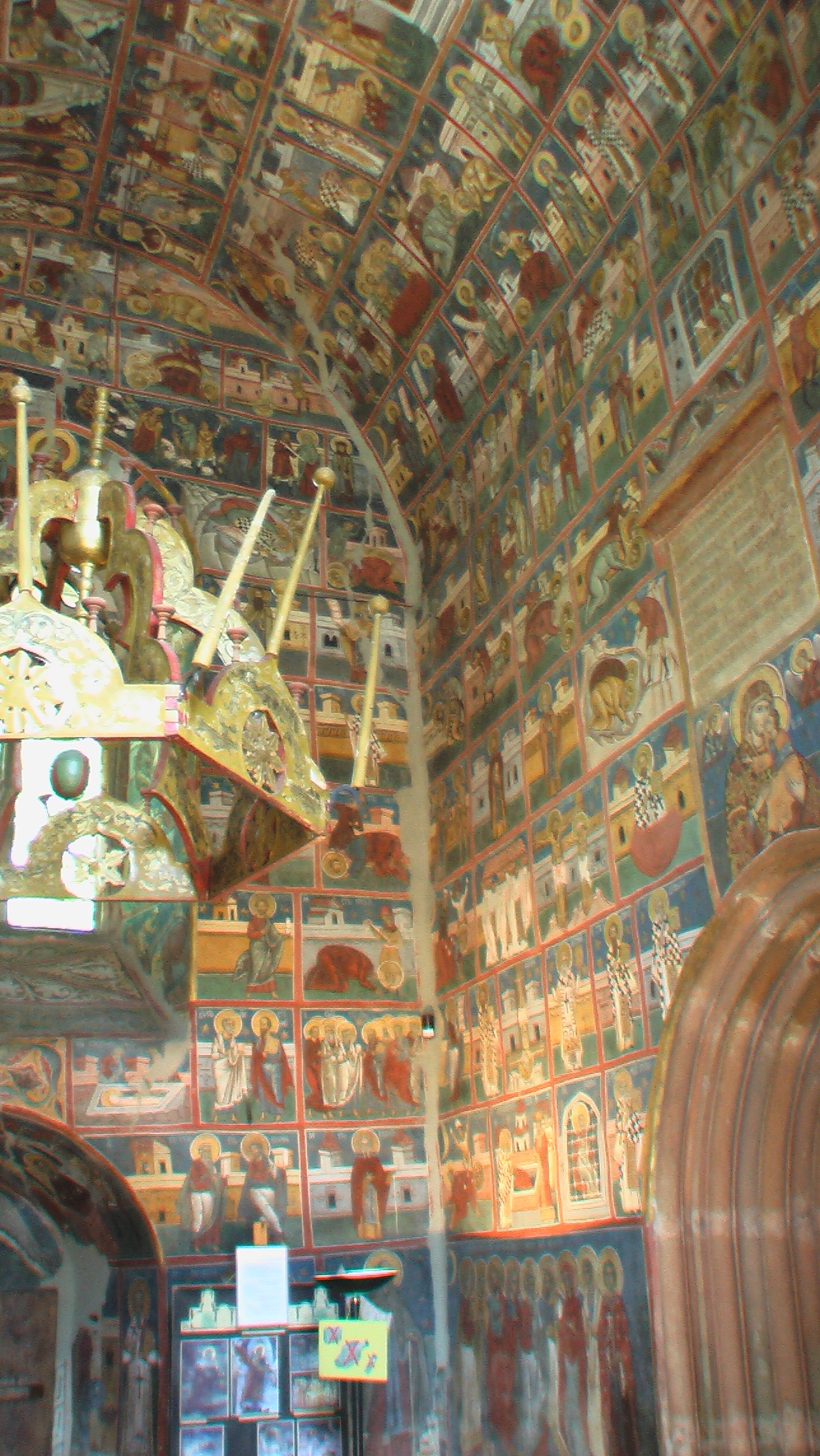

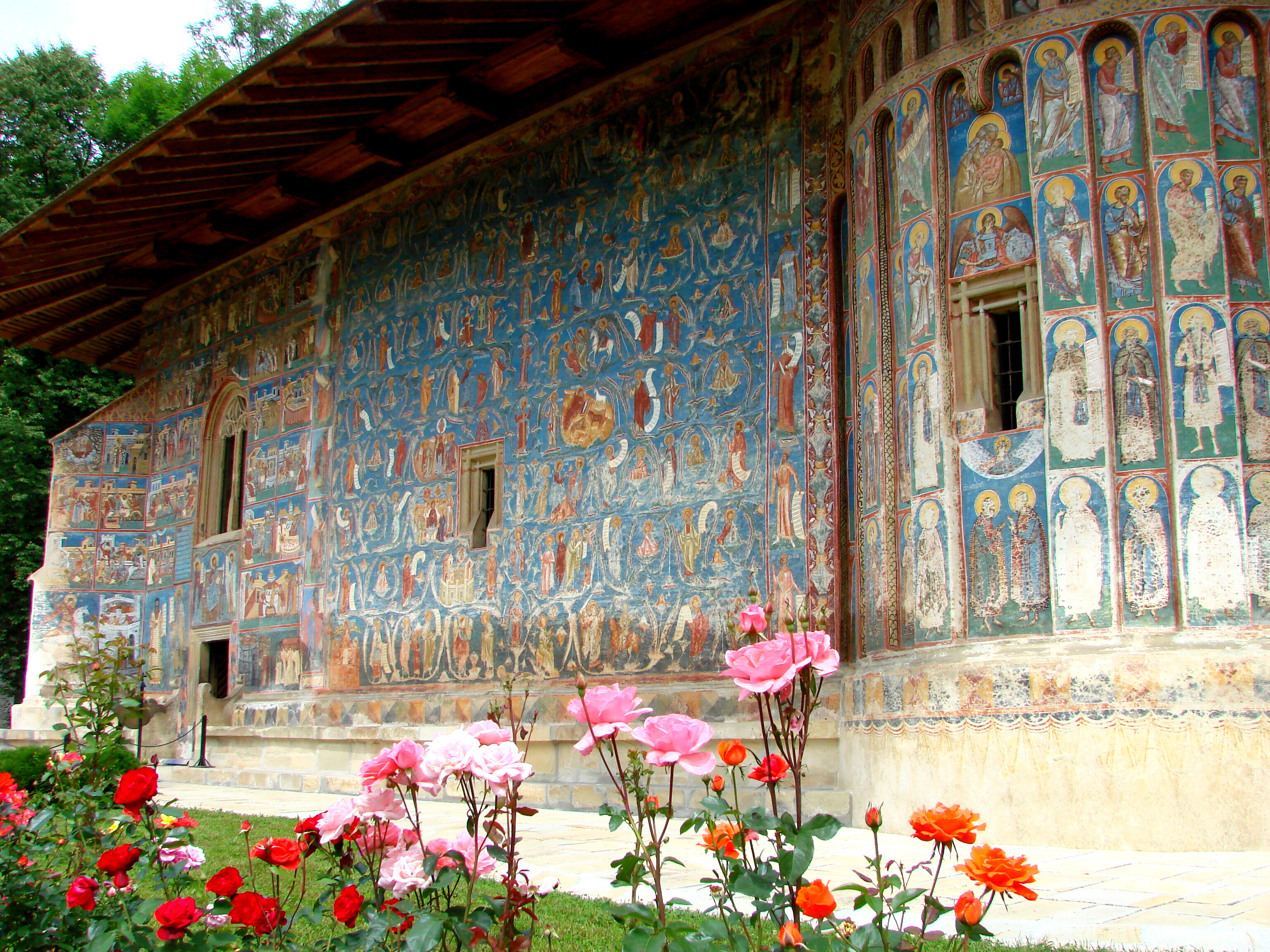

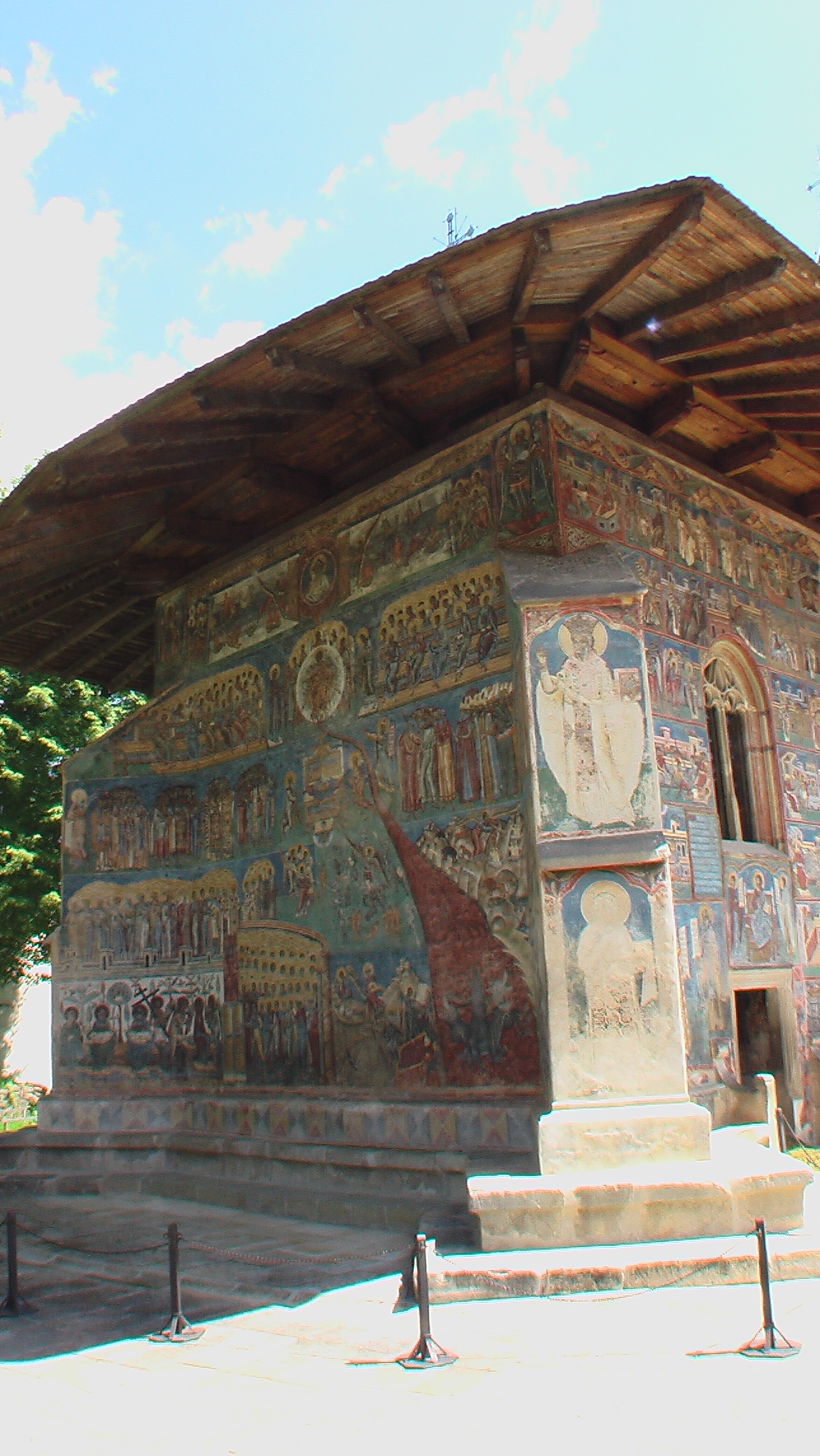

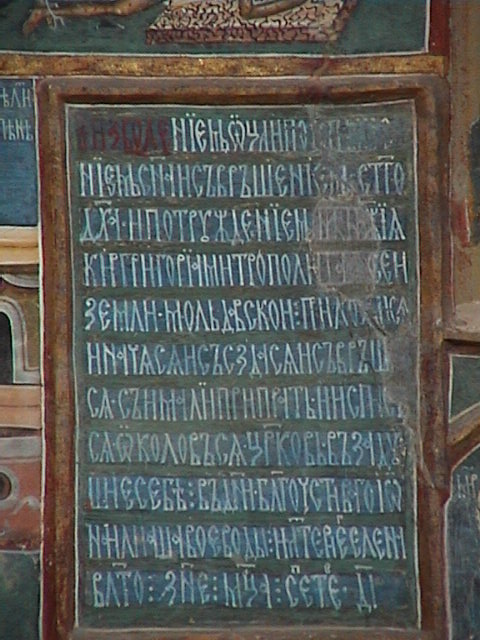

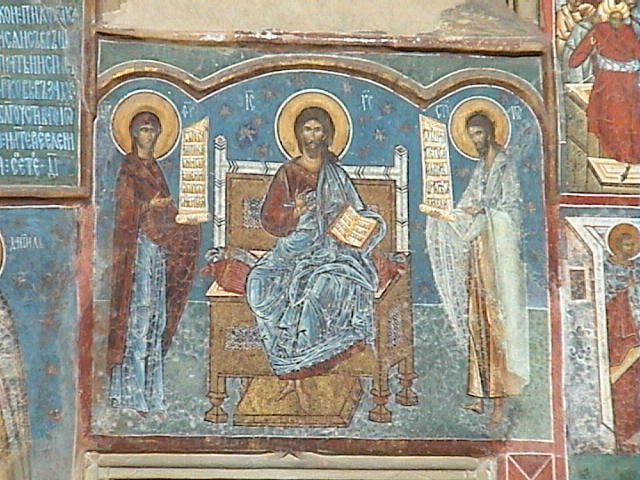

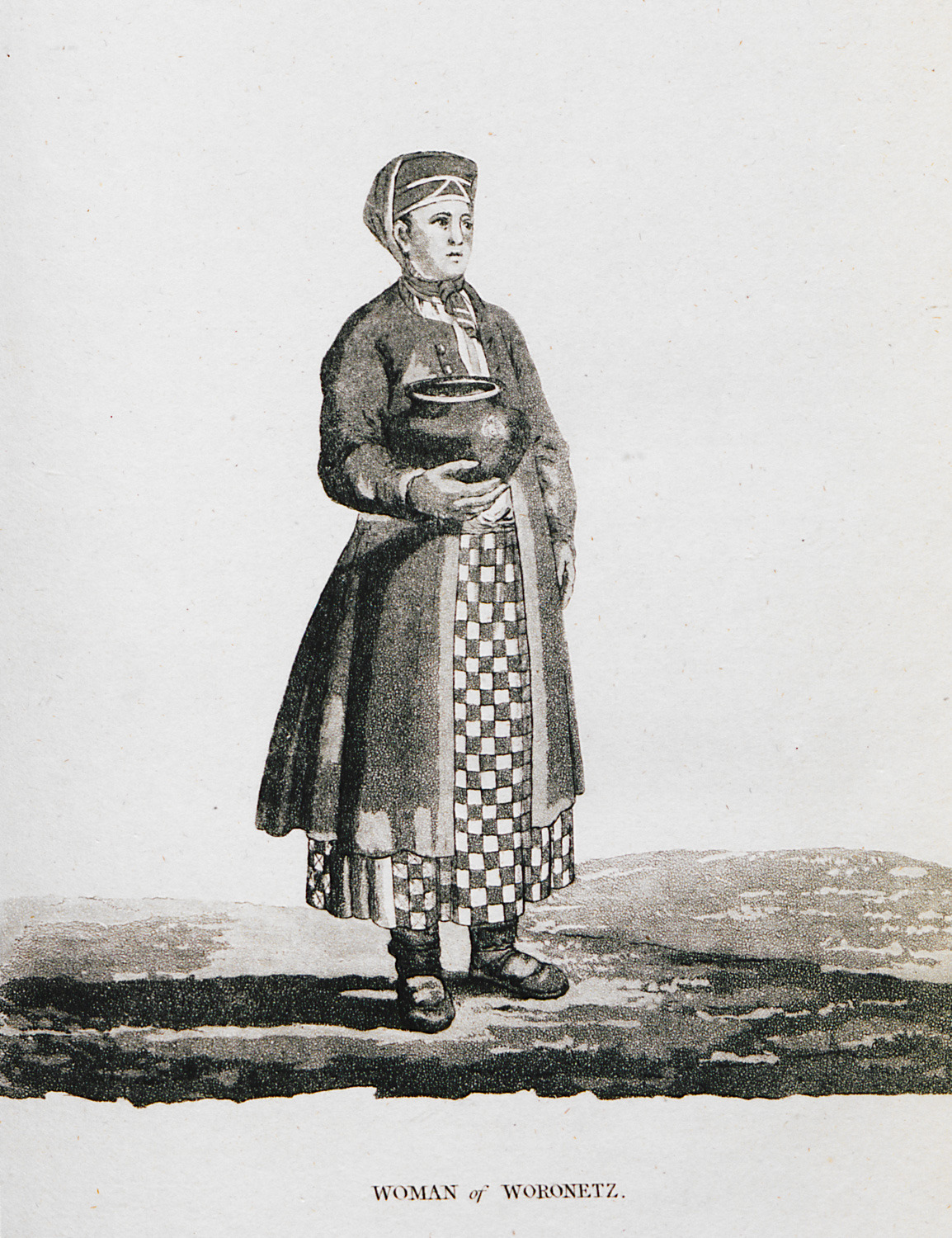
Woman from Voroneț by Clarke Edward Daniel

== See also ==
- List of Romanian Orthodox monasteries
- Churches of Moldavia
- Tourism in Romania
- Seven Wonders of Romania
- Byzantium After Byzantium, book by Nicolae Iorga
