= Putana (disambiguation) =

Putana is a demoness in Hindu mythology.

Putana may also refer to:

- Putana Volcano, Chile
- Putana River, Chile
- Prostitute

== See also ==
- Putna (disambiguation)
