= Putna (surname) =

Putna is a surname. Notable people with the surname include:

- Andrew Putna (born 1994), American soccer player
- Vitovt Putna (1893–1937), Soviet Red Army officer of Lithuanian origin
- Martin C. Putna (born 1968), Czech literary historian, university teacher, publicist, and essayist

== See also ==
- Putna, Romanian toponym
