= Putna (Suceava) =

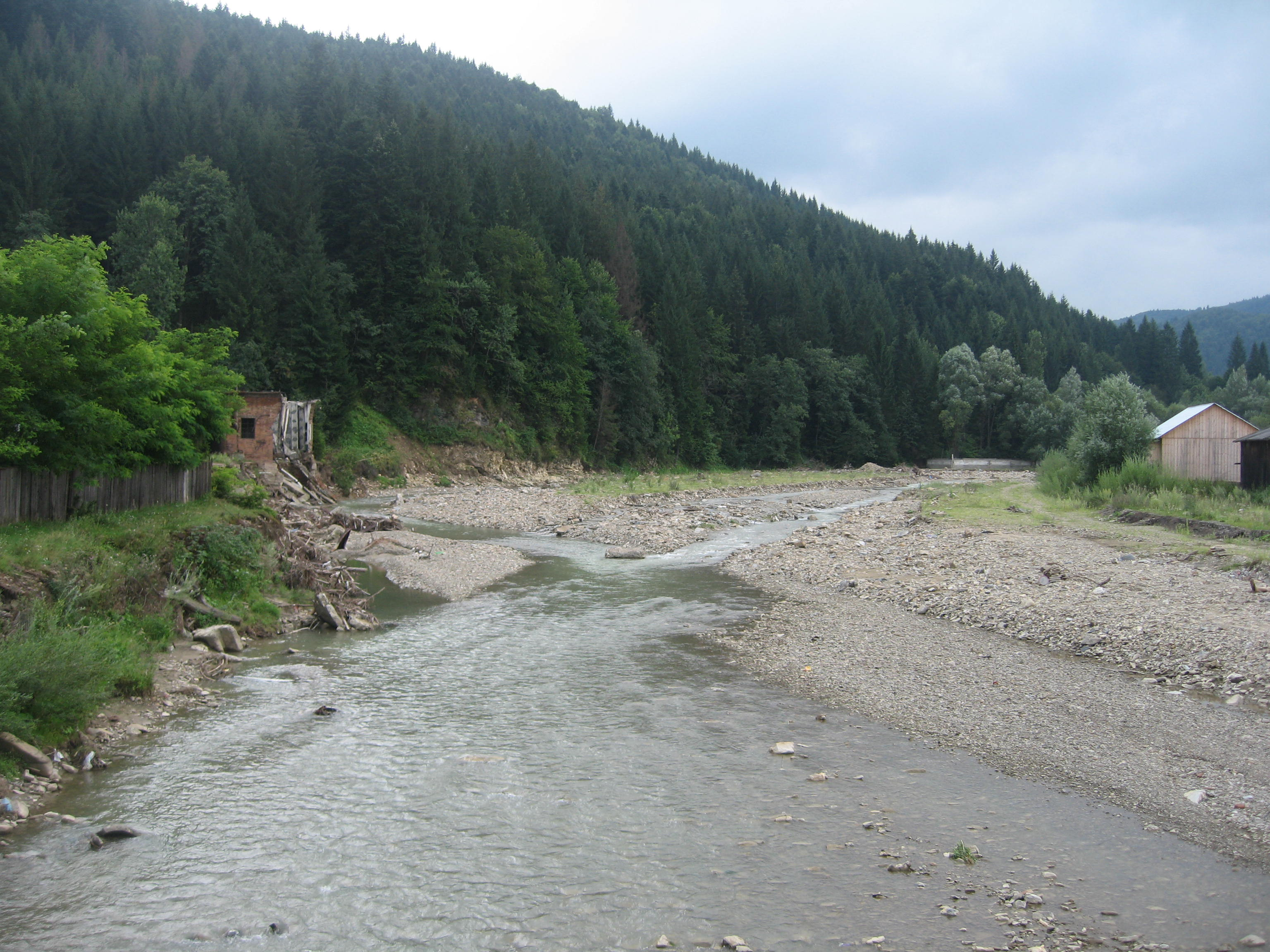

- Location within Romania

Location
- Country: Romania
- Counties: Suceava County
- Villages: Putna, Gura Putnei

Physical characteristics
- Mouth: Suceava
  - location: Vicovu de Sus
  - coordinates: 47.9189°N 25.6187°E
- Length: 20 km (12 mi)
- Basin size: 133 km^{2} (51 sq mi)

Basin features
- Progression: Suceava→ Siret→ Danube→ Black Sea
- Tributaries
  - right: Hașca, Putnișoara, Vițău

The Putna is a right tributary of the river Suceava in Romania. It discharges into the Suceava in Gura Putnei near Vicovu de Sus. Its length is 20 km (12 mi) and its basin size is 133 km^{2} (51 sq mi).
