= Vițău =

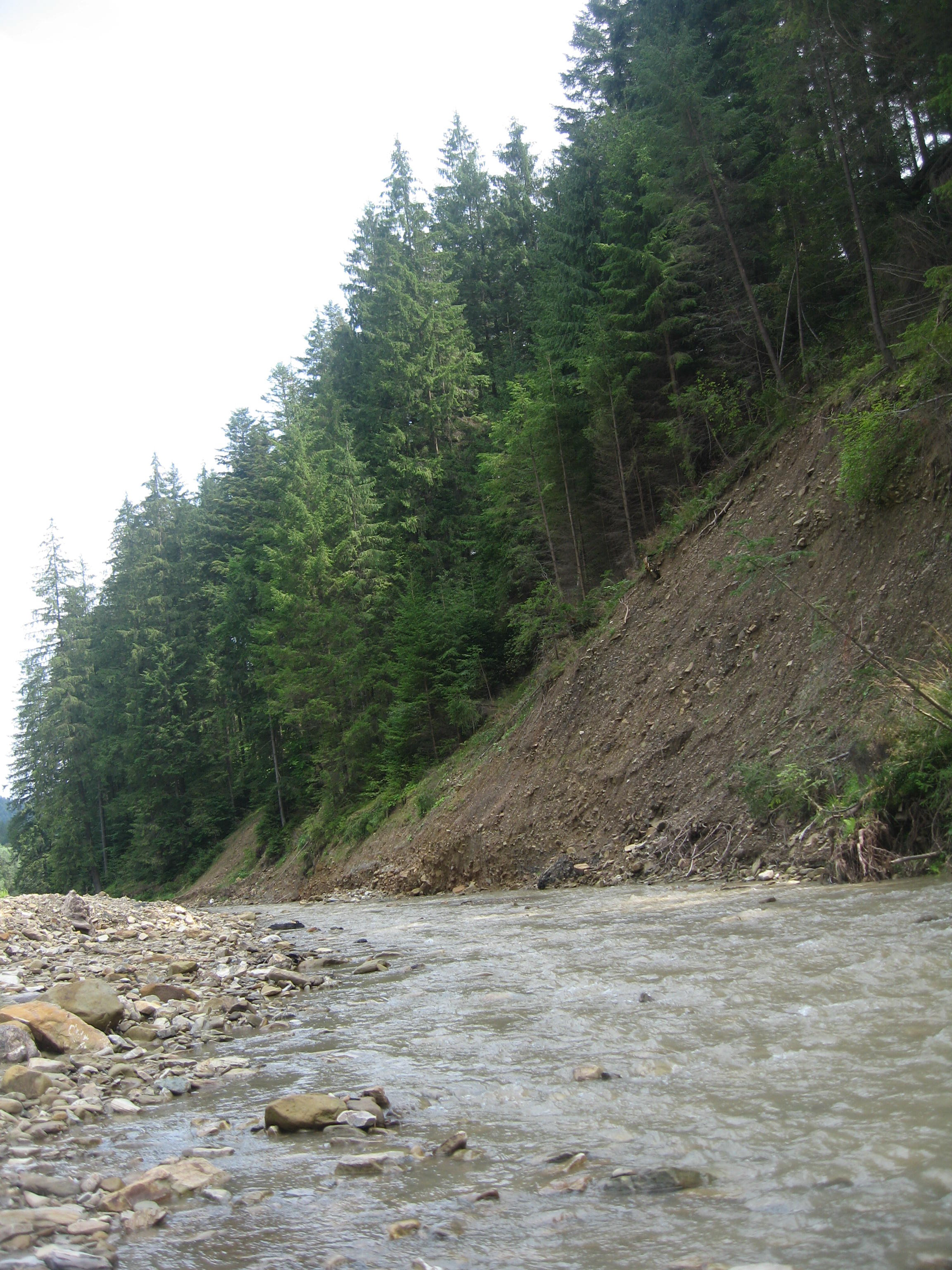

- Location within Romania

Location
- Country: Romania
- Counties: Suceava County

Physical characteristics
- Source: Obcina Mare
- Mouth: Putna
  - coordinates: 47.8675°N 25.6147°E
- Length: 8 km (5.0 mi)
- Basin size: 18 km^{2} (6.9 sq mi)

Basin features
- Progression: Putna→ Suceava→ Siret→ Danube→ Black Sea
- Tributaries
  - right: Aluniș

The Vițău is a right tributary of the river Putna in Romania. It flows into the Putna in the village Putna. Its length is 8 km (5.0 mi) and its basin size is 18 km^{2} (6.9 sq mi).
