= Anton Golopenția =

Romanian sociologist

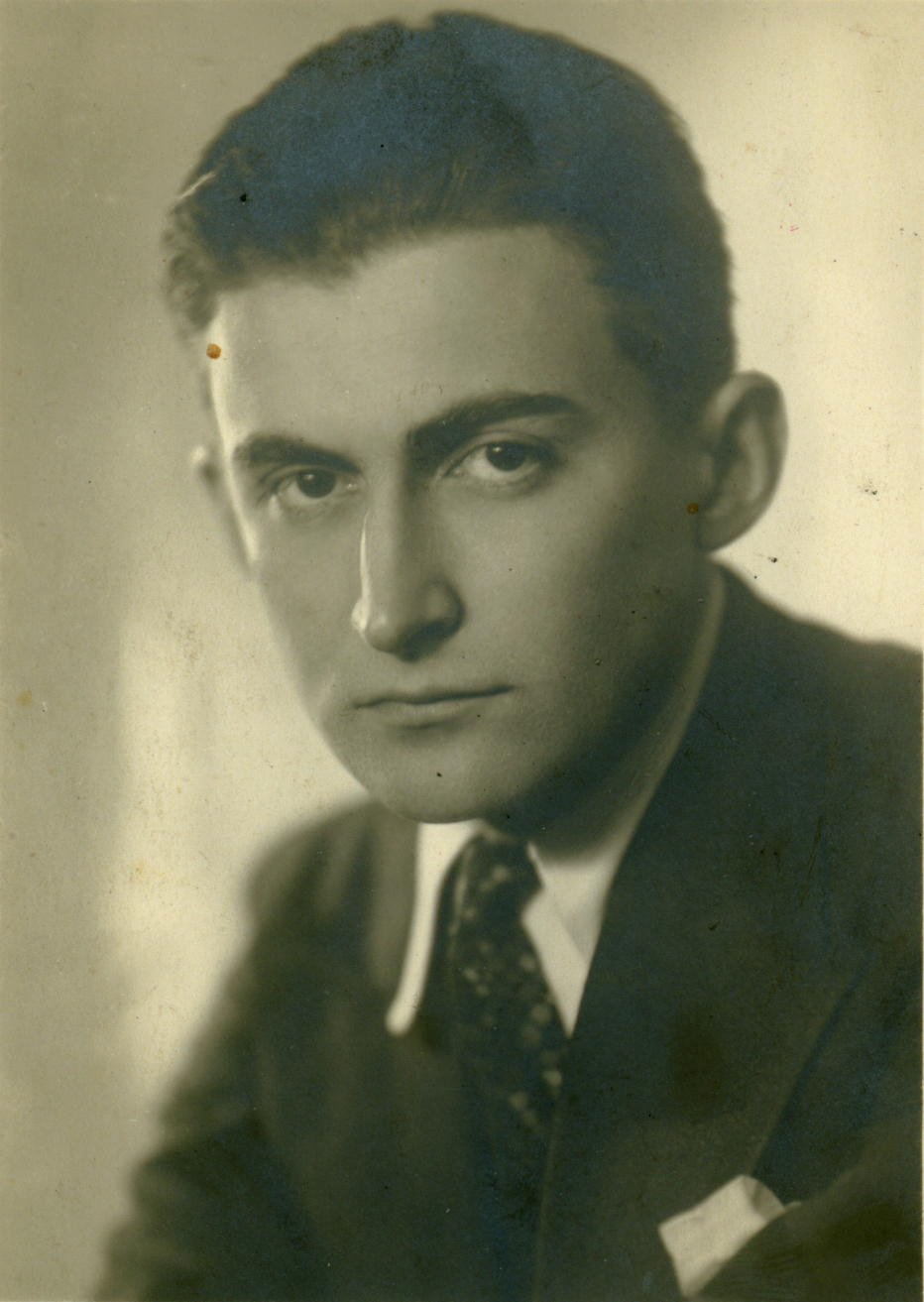
Anton Golopenția

Anton Golopenția (May 12, 1909 – September 9, 1951) was an Austro-Hungarian-born Romanian sociologist.

== Biography ==
=== Beginnings, education and early career ===
Born in Prigor, Caraș-Severin County, his father Simion was a lawyer originally from Pecinișca, while his mother Emma-Magdalena (née Staschek) was the daughter of a bank clerk from Bozovici. He divided his childhood between Prigor and Bozovici; when he was still a boy, his native region united with Romania. He attended high school in Timișoara, where he received top marks every year, graduating in 1927. He then enrolled in the University of Bucharest, graduating from its faculties of law (1930) and philosophy (1933). Between 1930 and 1933, he worked as a librarian at the university's sociology department. It was while working in the Bessarabian village of Cornova, with one of Dimitrie Gusti's teams of monographers, that the latter noticed Golopenția and recruited him into his inner circle. In 1932-1933, he was office director and then secretary to his professor Gusti, then serving as Education Minister. While in this position, he worked on a failed education reform project for his superior. He received a scholarship to study at the Leipzig University, which he did between 1933 and 1936; his doctoral thesis dealt with state leadership and traditional sociology.

Upon his return home, Golopenția returned to monographic work, and became editor of Sociologie românească magazine in January 1937. That autumn, he became a teaching assistant at the Gusti-chaired sociology, ethics and politics department, and a director at the latter's Social Institute. He also helped his mentor set up the Romanian pavilion at the 1937 Paris Expo. In 1939, he married Ștefania Cristescu, a Romanian-language teacher and folklore specialist. Due to differences of opinion regarding the methodology and purpose of sociological research, he left both the department and Gusti's Social Institute the same year. Golopenția was unemployed until the following April, when he was hired at the Central Statistics Institute. There, he worked on the team of director Sabin Manuilă, whom he accompanied to Turnu Severin for negotiations with Hungary that would be enshrined in the Second Vienna Award's territorial exchanges. He prepared and participated in the census undertaken in Bessarabia and northern Bukovina.

From August 1942 to autumn 1943 he led field operations, ordered by Conducător Ion Antonescu, for the identification of Moldovan families living east of the Bug River. In the summer of 1944, he met prominent Romanian Communist Party member Lucrețiu Pătrășcanu, to whom he had been recommended; Golopenția had been asked to support a change in regime, possibly by working within the Romanian Radio Broadcasting Company. He accepted, and immediately after Antonescu's overthrow during the August Coup, was included in the editing and distribution of România Liberă, which published the new regime's first decrees. By this time, Manuilă was a junior cabinet member and invited him to work as office director, but Golopenția flatly refused any further political involvement. He set up Comunicări statistice publication, and between autumn 1945 and summer 1946, helped complete tens of documents demanded by the Foreign Ministry's peace committee. In August–November 1946, he was at Paris, as a statistician of the Romanian delegation to the peace conference, a role he occupied upon Pătrășcanu's proposal.

=== Marginalization, downfall and legacy ===
After returning to Romania, Golopenția took over as director of the Statistics Institute, a position left vacant by Manuilă's resignation; as such, he headed the 1948 census. He remained there until that year's autumn, when he was dismissed by the authorities of the new communist regime, who were unwilling to accommodate his politically independent stance. Over the course of the following year, working at home, he occasionally compiled documents at the request of the State Planning Committee; this institution was headed by Miron Constantinescu, who had previously undertaken monographic research on a Golopenția-led team. He also worked on a textbook of Romanian statistical history, which he hoped would encompass all statistical data related to the history of the Romanians, as well as critical commentary. He spent ample time in the Romanian Academy's library, but began to grow alarmed as the amount of work assigned dwindled.

He was placed under surveillance in October 1949: the Securitate secret police had heard he was on friendly terms with Pătrășcanu, arrested the year before, and with the latter's entourage, especially Bellu Zilber and a certain N. Betea whom Golopenția had hired as a statistician. In January 1950, he was arrested as a witness in the Pătrășcanu case. The investigators thought he could be useful in their quest to fabricate charges against Pătrășcanu, but Golopenția was a mere bystander. Their ties amounted to the following: he had helped Pătrășcanu assist communist detainees at Caransebeș internment camp; lent a hand in announcing the 1944 coup on radio; received Pătrășcanu's proofs for his comments on a volume on philosophy he had written (which the latter largely ignored); was valued by him as a democratically minded intellectual; sent by him to Paris, perhaps at the suggestion of Zilber, whom Golopenția had first met in 1932-1934; and the two had held conversations while in France.

At first, he was made to give statements about Pătrășcanu, Zilber, the group of young statisticians with whom he worked east of the Bug, N. Betea and the Romanian emigrants he met in Paris (including Mircea Eliade, Emil Cioran, and Mihai Șora). Nothing conclusive emerged, and the investigation moved on to another phase. In 1947, while Pătrășcanu was attending a conference in Brussels, Betea had asked Golopenția to write two letters of recommendation for western academics, as Pătrășcanu's circle had suggested he go into exile. Golopenția wrote two letters, not knowing their purpose. He was extensively questioned about this episode, and about another letter he had sent to Manuilă, by then in the United States, through an Italian diplomat in Bucharest. The three letters were bland and apolitical, but the investigators insisted he knew Pătrășcanu was planning on not returning to Romania, which he invariably denied. It was also charged that Betea, in semi-hiding, had asked Golopenția to tell Pătrășcanu to stay away from Romania. Eventually, he admitted knowing Pătrășcanu's plans, but denied sending him a message.

His denials persisted, but in March, he suddenly admitted to having written, the previous autumn, a manuscript containing suggestions for a future non-communist government and how the country should be reorganized. At that point, the questions shifted to his alleged hostile activity against the regime, and the document to which he confessed, a few pages in length, was found after an investigation. It counted on a war between the United States and the Soviet Union that would end in a Pax Americana. Then, in June, Golopenția's prison conditions underwent a rapid improvement: he was given writing paper, which he used to draft his memoirs and letters to his family, as well as to chief prosecutor Constantinescu. He asked for books to read, including Das Kapital. After a brief hiatus, the insistent interrogations resumed, until May 1951; these proved exhausting to the sickly Golopenția, who contracted a rapidly advancing case of tuberculosis.

Gravely ill, he was taken to the hospital of Văcărești Prison in August 1951, dying nearly a month later. The physician who investigated his death noted that, although the case was hopeless, he should have been provided with antibiotics. The following day, he was buried in Jilava cemetery. He was survived by his widow and two children, Sanda and Dan. He was never tried or sentenced (Pătrășcanu's trial took place nearly three years later), and in 1968, following the latter's rehabilitation, Ștefania Golopenția asked the same for her husband. The following year, she received verbal confirmation of his rehabilitation. She was beset by difficulties following his death, and compelled to teach in elementary schools in spite of her professional background; she died in 1978. The couple's daughter Sanda considered it her moral duty to shed light on her father's plight; to this end, she published his correspondence, part of his scientific work, and a nearly thousand-page collection of the statements he gave under interrogation, published in 2001 after three years of research. In 2017, Golopenția was posthumously elected a member of the Romanian Academy.
