= Vicovu de Sus =

Vicovu de Sus German: Ober Wikow
- Town
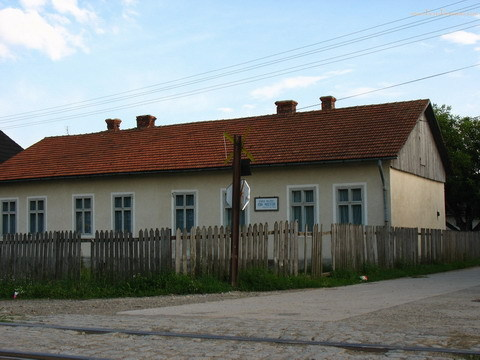
- Ion Nistor memorial house

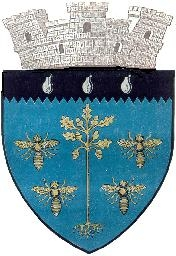
- Coat of arms

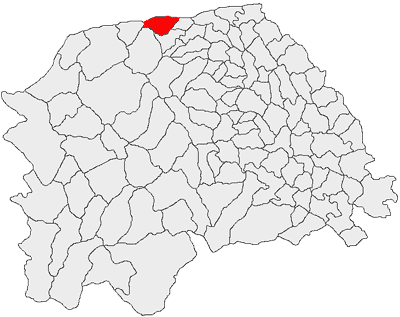
- Location in Suceava County

- Location in Romania
- Coordinates: 47°55′33″N 25°40′48″E
- Country: Romania
- County: Suceava

Government
  - Mayor (2024–2028): Vasile Iliuț (PNL)
- Area: 42.42 km^{2} (16.38 sq mi)
- Elevation: 462 m (1,516 ft)
- Population (2021-12-01): 15,143
  - Density: 357.0/km^{2} (924.6/sq mi)
- Time zone: UTC+02:00 (EET)
  - Summer (DST): UTC+03:00 (EEST)
- Postal code: 727610
- Area code: (+40) 02 30
- Vehicle reg.: SV
- Website: www.primariavicovudesus.ro

Vicovu de Sus (Romanian pronunciation: [ˌvikovu de ˈsus]; German: Ober-Wikow or Oberwikow) is a town in northern Suceava County, on the border with Ukraine. It is situated in the historical regions of Bukovina and Western Moldavia.

== History ==
It was bought by Ștefan cel Mare for Putna Monastery in the year 1466. The locality, previously a rural commune, received town status in 2004.

Historical affiliations

Moldavia (1388–1775)
Habsburg Monarchy (1775–1804)
Austrian Empire (1804–1867)
Austria-Hungary, Cisleithania (1867–1918)
Kingdom of Romania (1918–1947)
Romanian People's Republic (1947–1965)
Socialist Republic of Romania (1965–1989)
Romania (1989–present)

== Natives ==
- Gherasim Clipa-Barbovschi (c.1760–1826), cleric
- Ion Nistor (1876–1962), historian and politician
- Aurel Onciul (1864–1921), politician
- Daniil Sihastrul, Romanian Orthodox spiritual guide, advisor of Stephen the Great, and hegumen of Voroneț Monastery

== Demographics ==
Historical population
Year	Pop.	±%
1910	7,395	—
1930	8,552	+15.6%
1992	14,077	+64.6%
2002	14,125	+0.3%
2011	13,053	−7.6%
2022	15,143	+16.0%
Source: Official Romanian census data

According to the 2021 census, Vicovu de Sus has 15,143 inhabitants. At the 2011 census, the town had a population of 13,053, of which 94.7% were ethnic Romanians and 5% ethnic Romani. 76.7% were Romanian Orthodox, 20.9% Pentecostal, and 2% Baptist.

== Administration and local politics ==
=== Town council ===
==== 2024–present ====
The town's current local council for the period 2024–2028 has the following multi-party political composition, based on the results of the votes cast at the 2024 Romanian local elections:

Party	Seats	Current Council
National Liberal Party (PNL)	9	
Social Democratic Party (PSD)	5	
Alliance for the Union of Romanians (AUR)	2	
Independent politician (Cîrdei Marinel)	1	
