= Prigor =

- Commune
- Borlovenii Vechi village

- Coat of arms

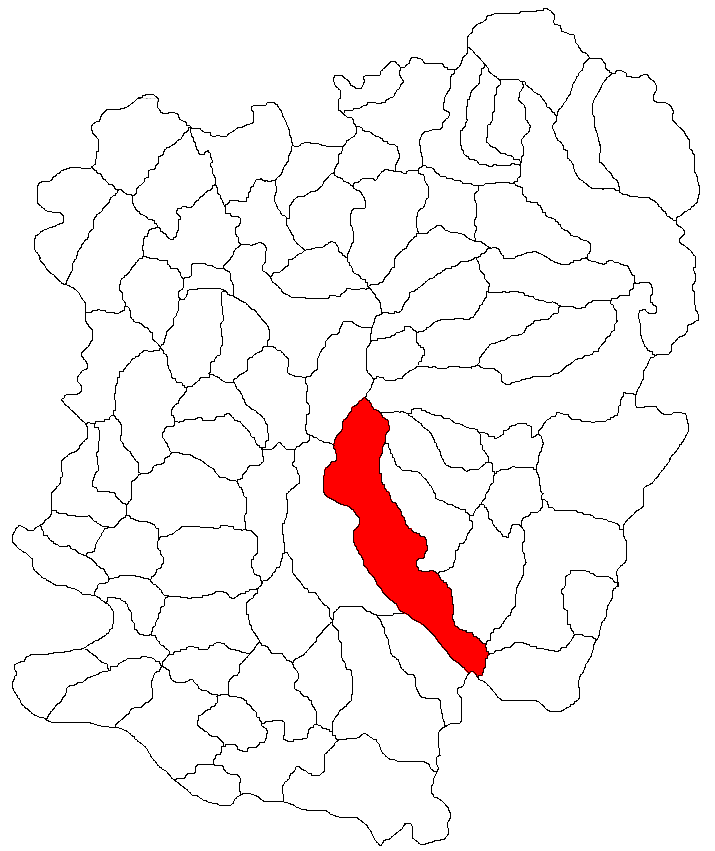
- Location in Caraș-Severin County

- Location in Romania
- Coordinates: 44°56′N 22°07′E
- Country: Romania
- County: Caraș-Severin

Government
  - Mayor (2024–2028): Simona Miclău (PSD)
- Area: 301.37 km^{2} (116.36 sq mi)
- Elevation: 291 m (955 ft)
- Population (2021-12-01): 2,078
  - Density: 6.895/km^{2} (17.86/sq mi)
- Time zone: UTC+02:00 (EET)
  - Summer (DST): UTC+03:00 (EEST)
- Postal code: 327305
- Area code: +(40) 02 55
- Vehicle reg.: CS
- Website: primariaprigor.ro

Prigor (Hungarian: Prigor) is a commune in Caraș-Severin County, western Romania with a population of 2,078 people as of 2021. It is composed of five villages: Borlovenii Noi (Újborlovény), Borlovenii Vechi (Óborlovény), Pătaș (Nérapatas), Prigor, and Putna.

The Via Transilvanica, a long-distance trail, passes through Prigor.

Historical population
Year	Pop.	±%
1880	4,821	—
1910	5,232	+8.5%
1930	4,594	−12.2%
1977	3,963	−13.7%
2002	2,978	−24.9%
2011	2,577	−13.5%
2021	2,078	−19.4%
Source: Census data

== Notable people ==
- Anton Golopenția (1909–1951), a notable Romanian sociologist
- Iosif Rotariu (1962–present), football player
