= Putna, Suceava =

Putna
- Commune
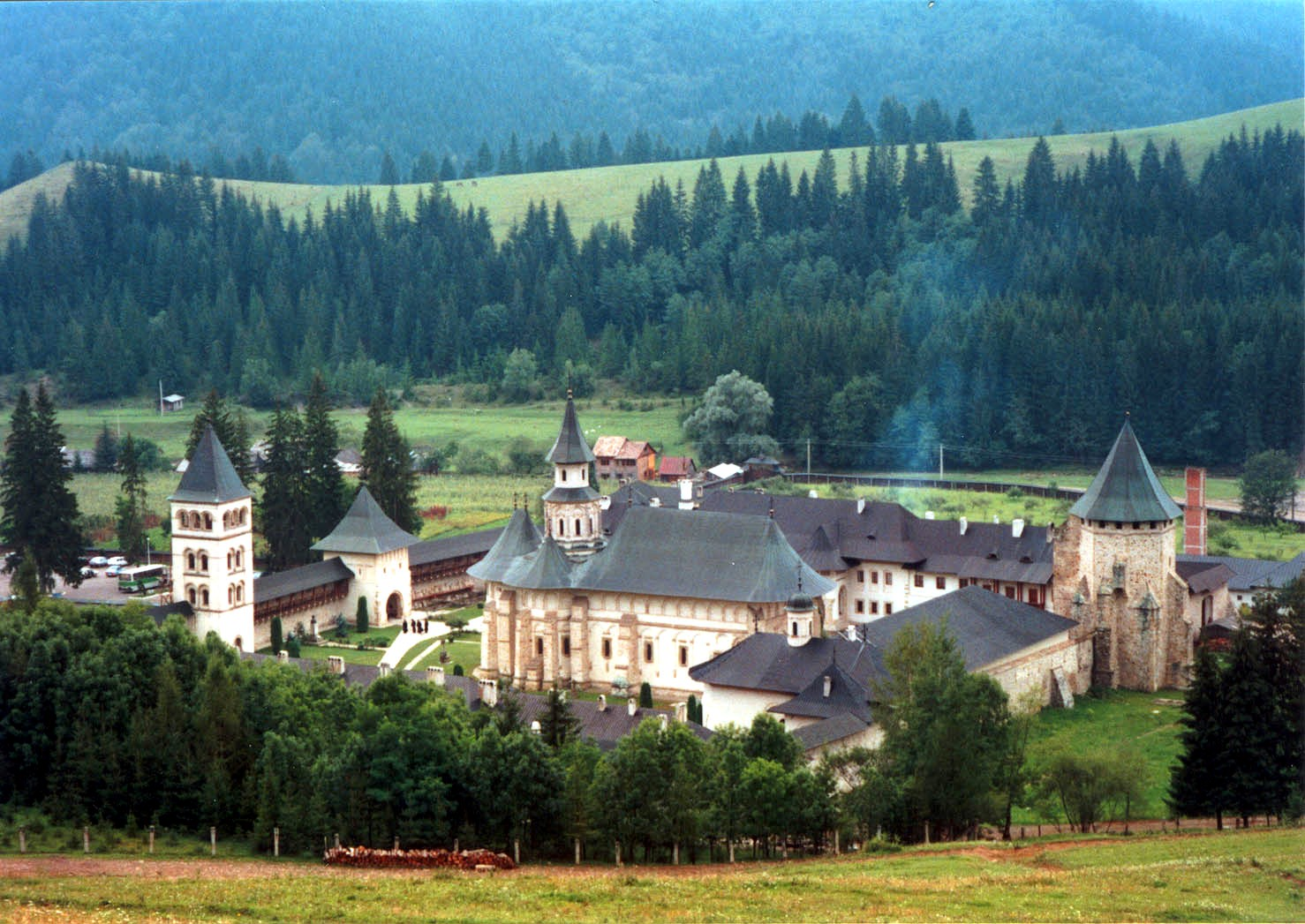
- The medieval Putna monastery (as seen in the summer of 2000)

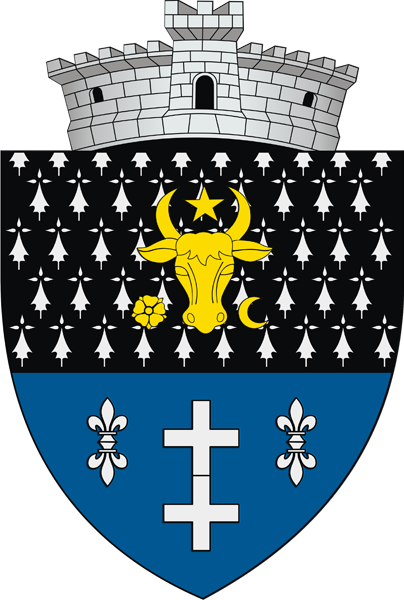
- Coat of arms

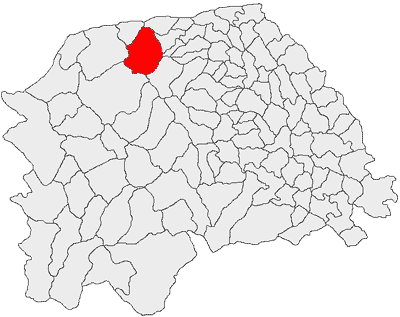
- Location in Suceava County

- Location in Romania
- Coordinates: 47°52′N 25°37′E
- Country: Romania
- County: Suceava
- Subdivisions: Putna, Gura Putnei

Government
  - Mayor (2024–2028): Gheorghe Coroamă (PNL)
- Area: 133.70 km^{2} (51.62 sq mi)
- Elevation: 548 m (1,798 ft)
- Population (2021-12-01): 3,658
  - Density: 27.36/km^{2} (70.86/sq mi)
- Time zone: UTC+02:00 (EET)
  - Summer (DST): UTC+03:00 (EEST)
- Postal code: 727455
- Area code: (+40) x30
- Vehicle reg.: SV
- Website: primariaputna.ro

Putna (German: Kloster-Putna) is a commune in Suceava County, in the historical region of Bukovina, northeastern Romania. It is composed of two villages, namely Gura Putnei (German: Karlsberg) and Putna. The Putna Monastery, Putna River, and the cave of Daniil Sihastrul are located in this commune. It is also the starting point of the Via Transilvanica long-distance trail.

== History ==
Historical affiliations

Moldavia (1388–1775)
Habsburg Monarchy (1775–1804)
Austrian Empire (1804–1867)
Austria-Hungary, Cisleithania (1867–1918)
Kingdom of Romania (1918–1947)
Romanian People's Republic (1947–1965)
Socialist Republic of Romania (1965–1989)
Romania (1989–present)

As it is the case of other rural settlements from Suceava County, Putna was previously inhabited by a sizeable German community, more specifically by Zipser Germans (part of the larger Bukovina German community) during the modern period up until the mid 20th century, starting as early as the Habsburg period and, later on, the Austro-Hungarian period. The German community was primarily significant in Gura Putnei (German: Karlsberg).

== Administration and local politics ==
=== Communal council ===
The commune's current local council has the following political composition, according to the results of the 2020 Romanian local elections:

Party	Seats	Current Council
National Liberal Party (PNL)	9	
Social Democratic Party (PSD)	3	
Independent (Crețan Ciprian-Florentin)	1	

== Gallery ==
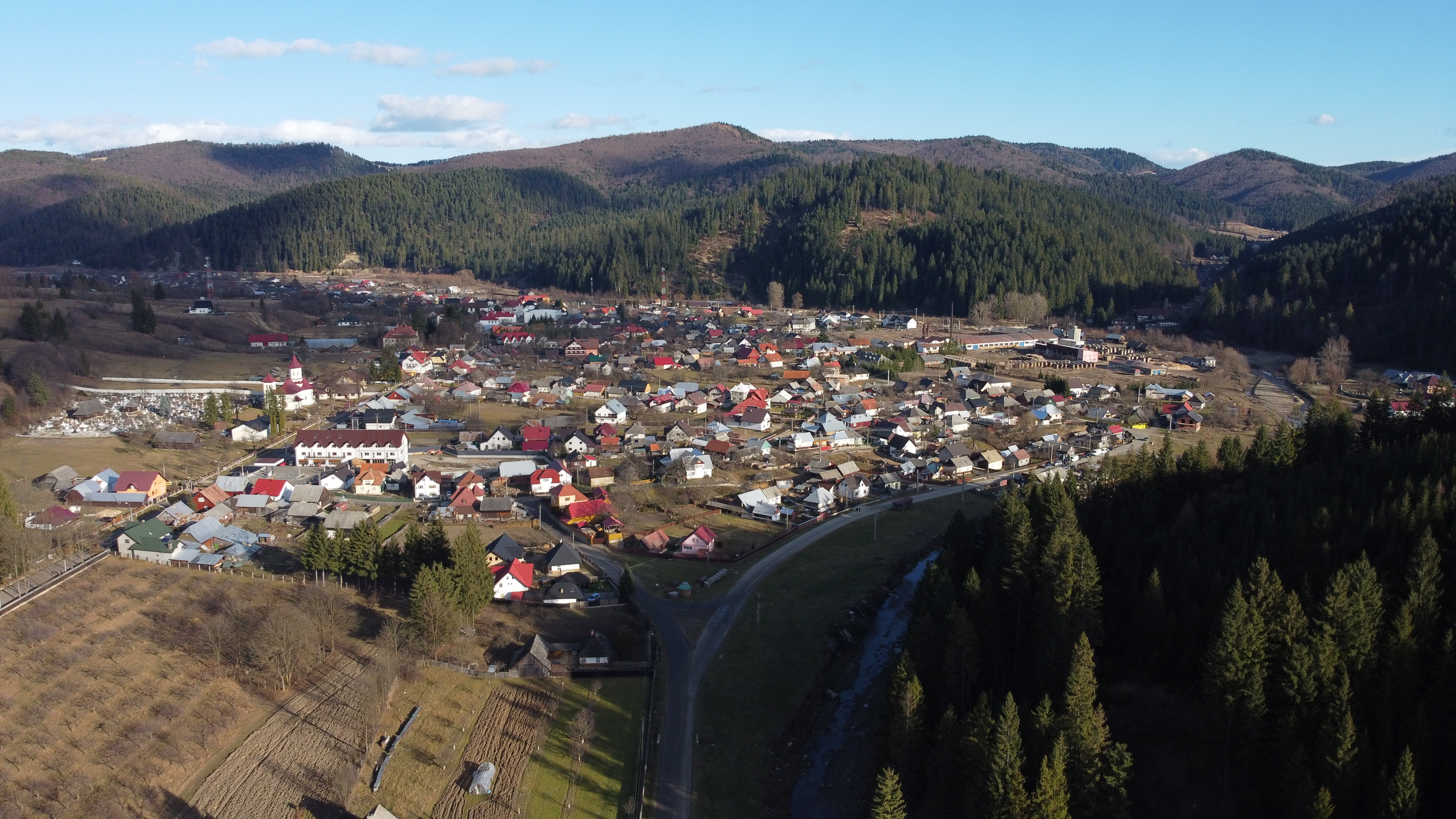
Overview of Putna

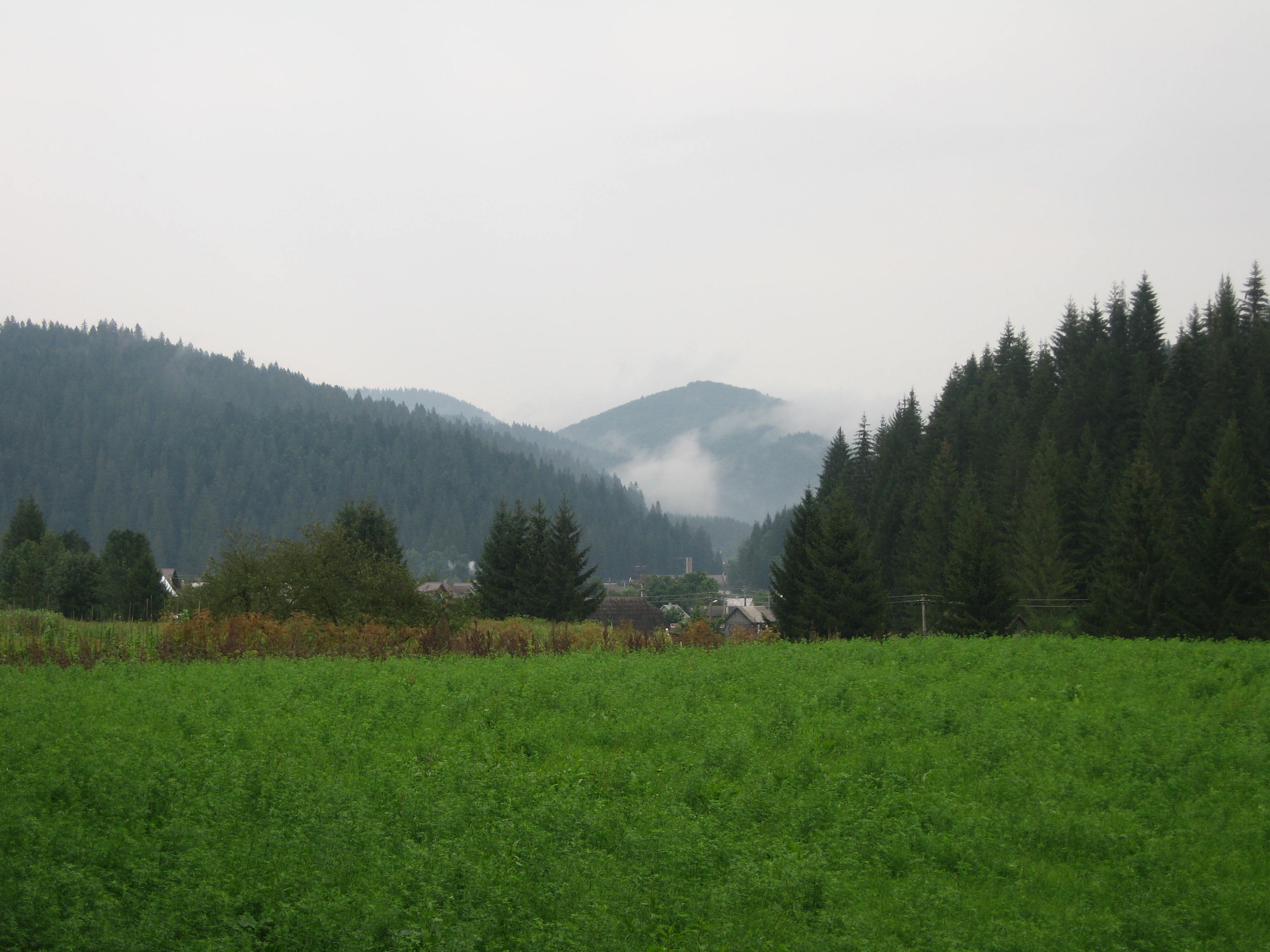
View of Putna village

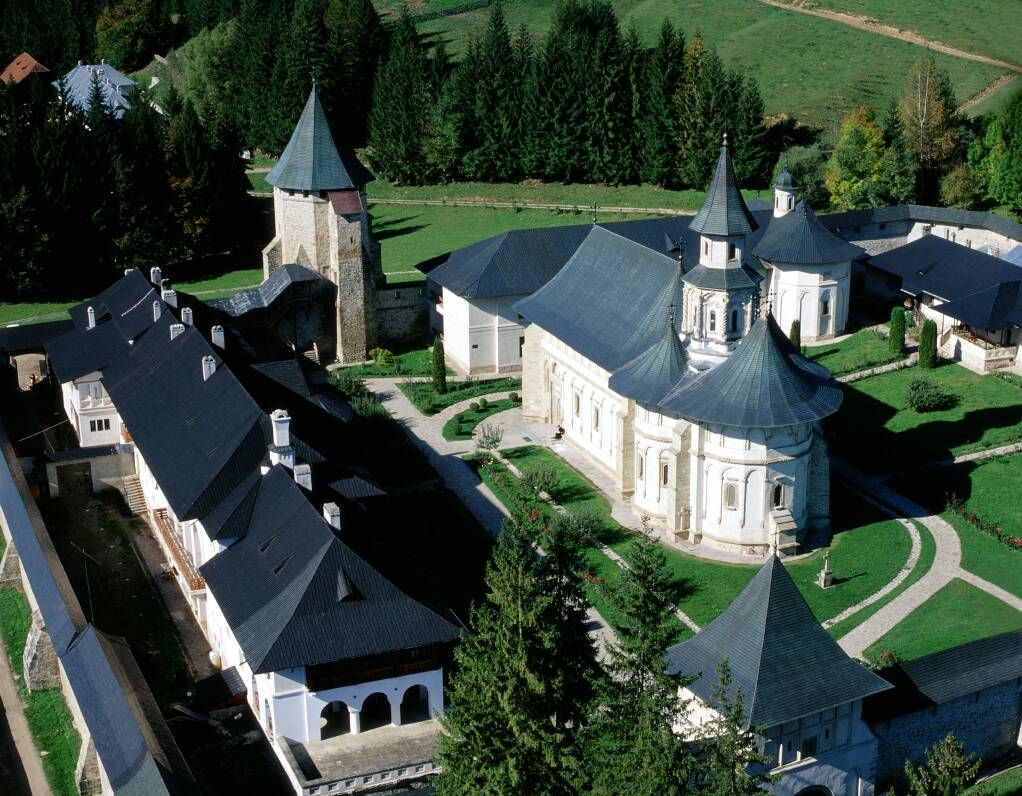
Putna monastery

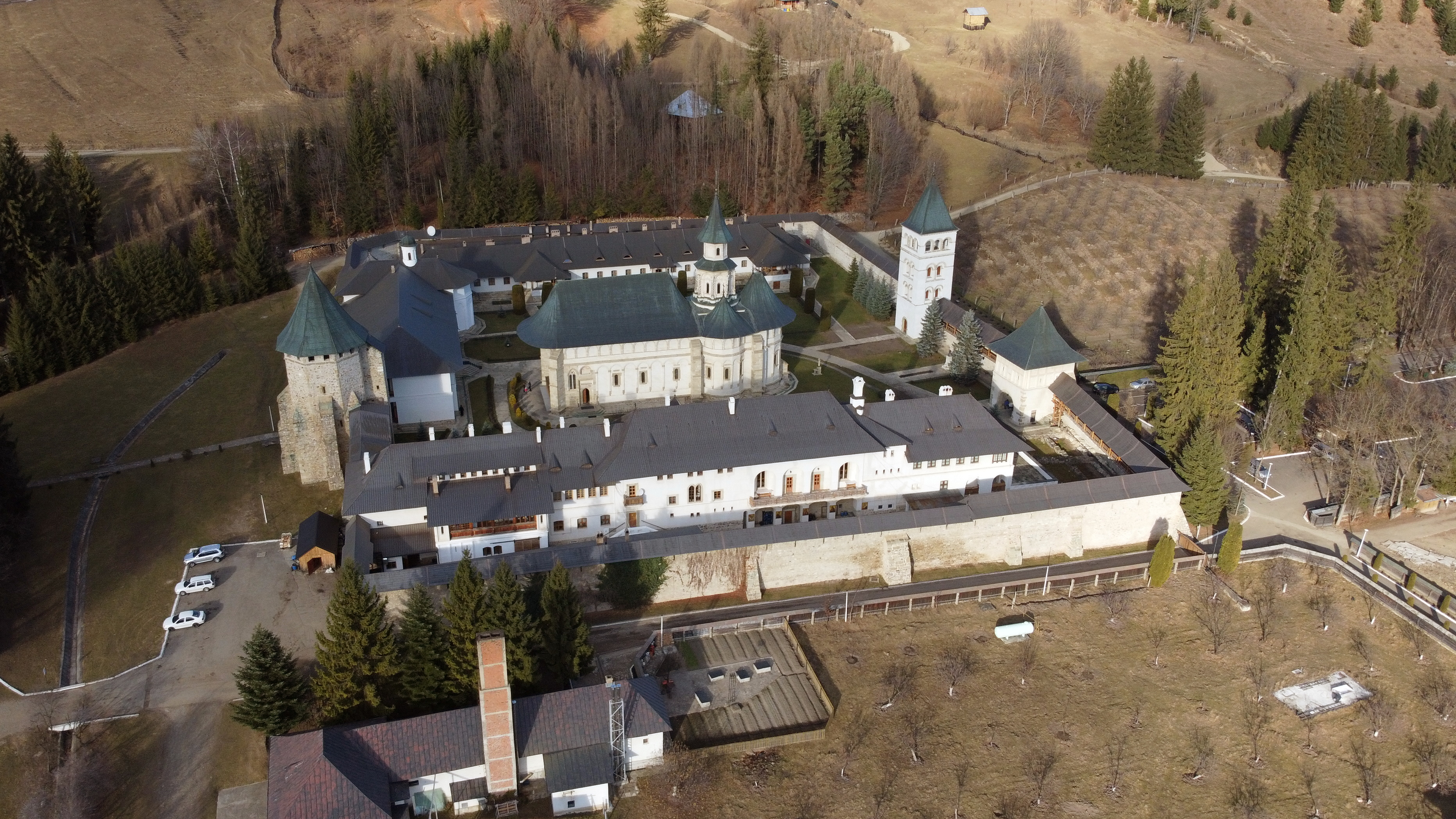
Aerial view of Putna monastery

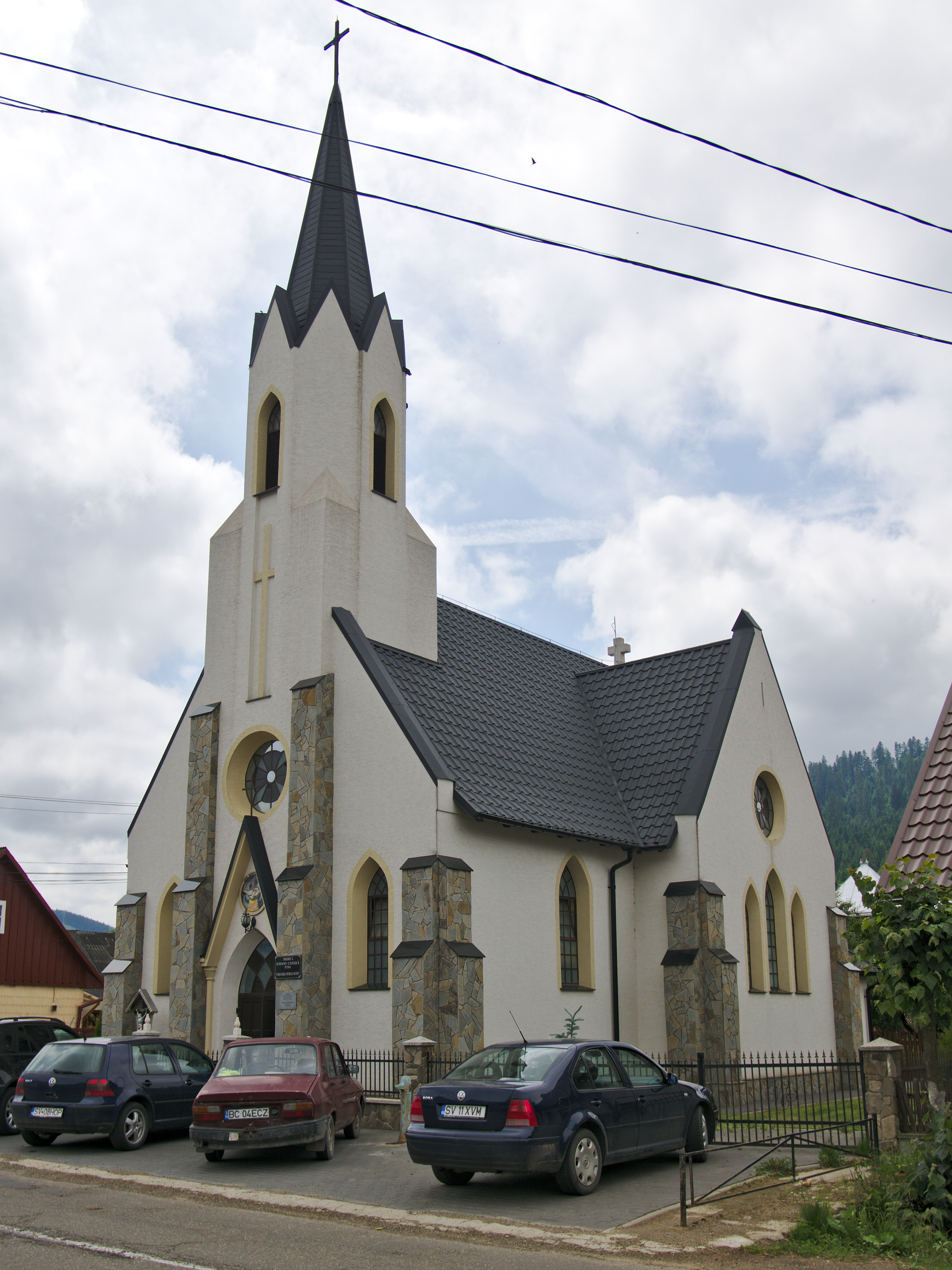
Roman Catholic church in Gura Putnei

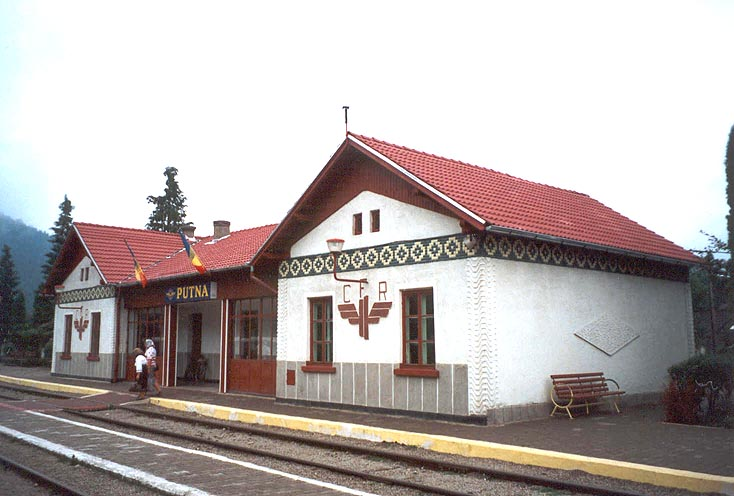
Putna train station (summer 2000)

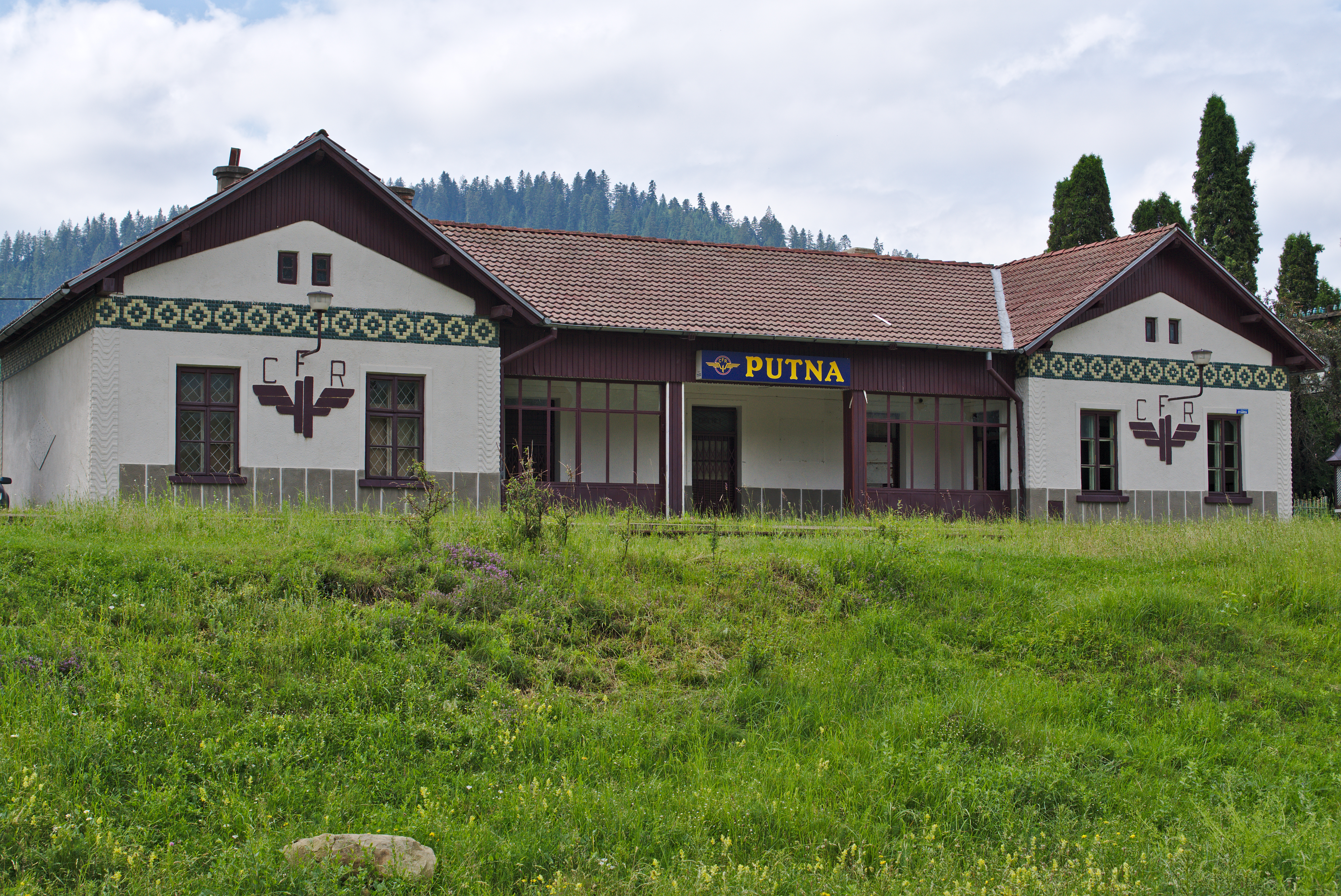
Putna train station (2016)

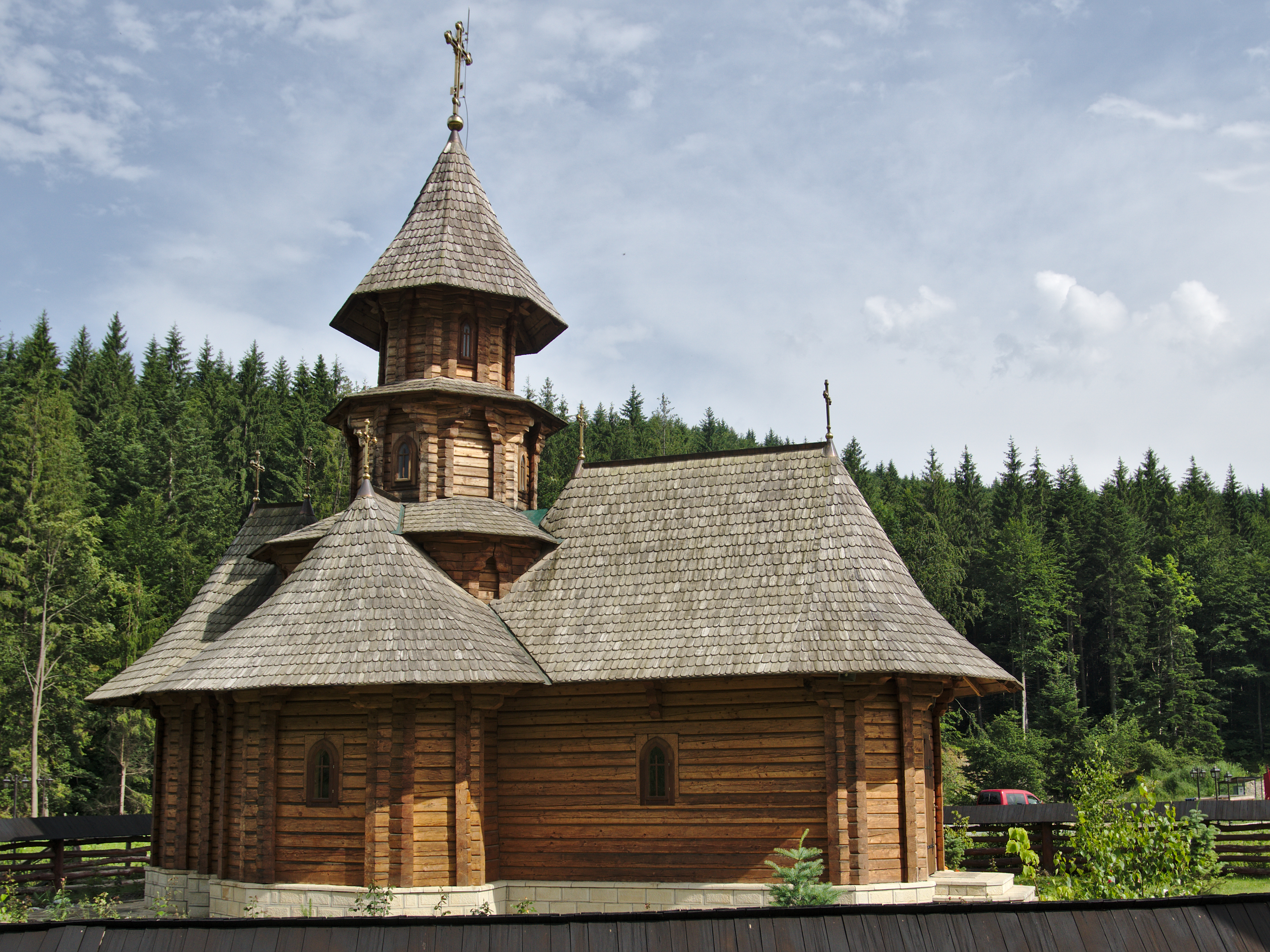
Mănăstirea Sihăstria Putnei wooden church

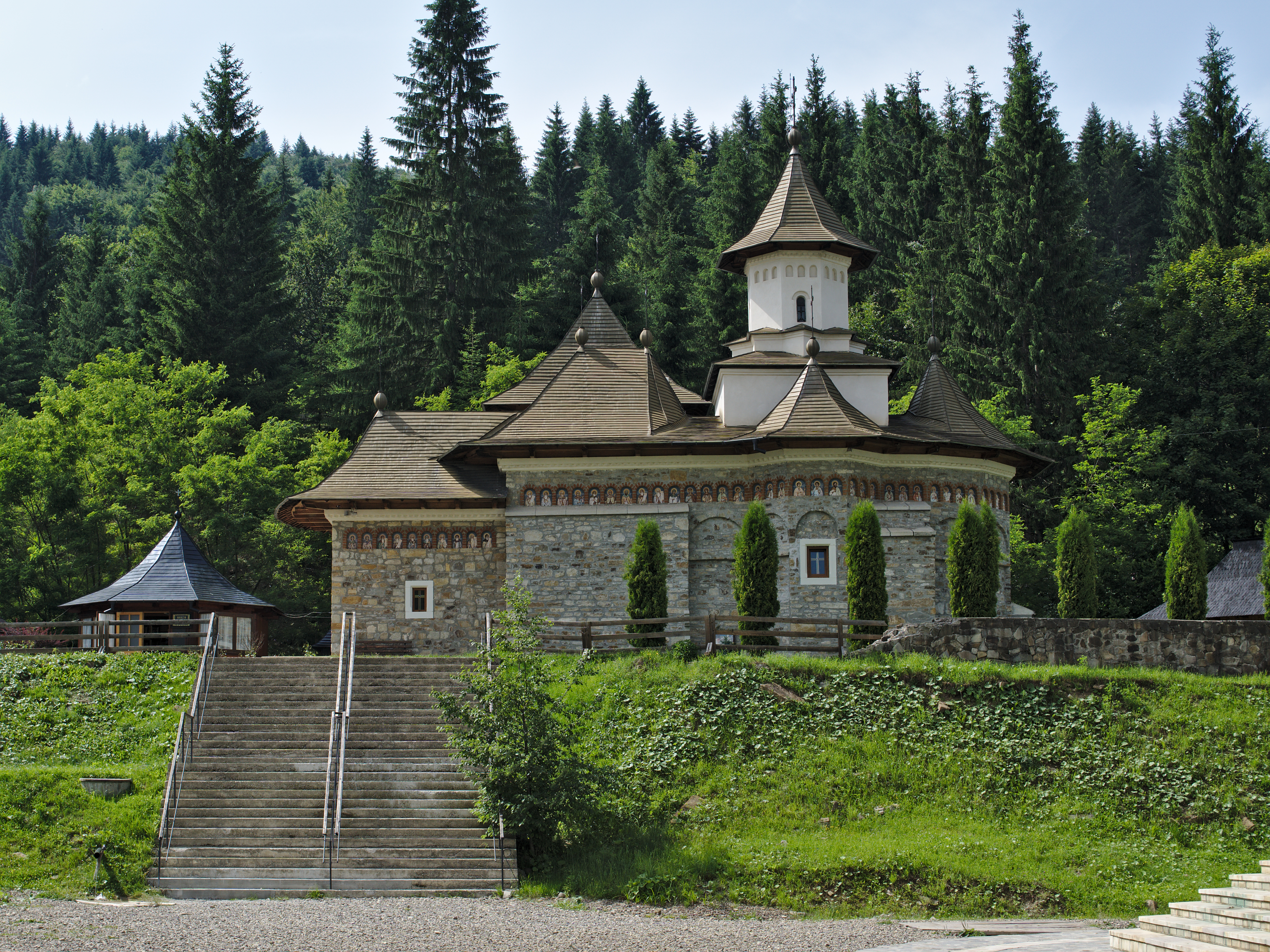
Mănăstirea Sihăstria Putnei old church

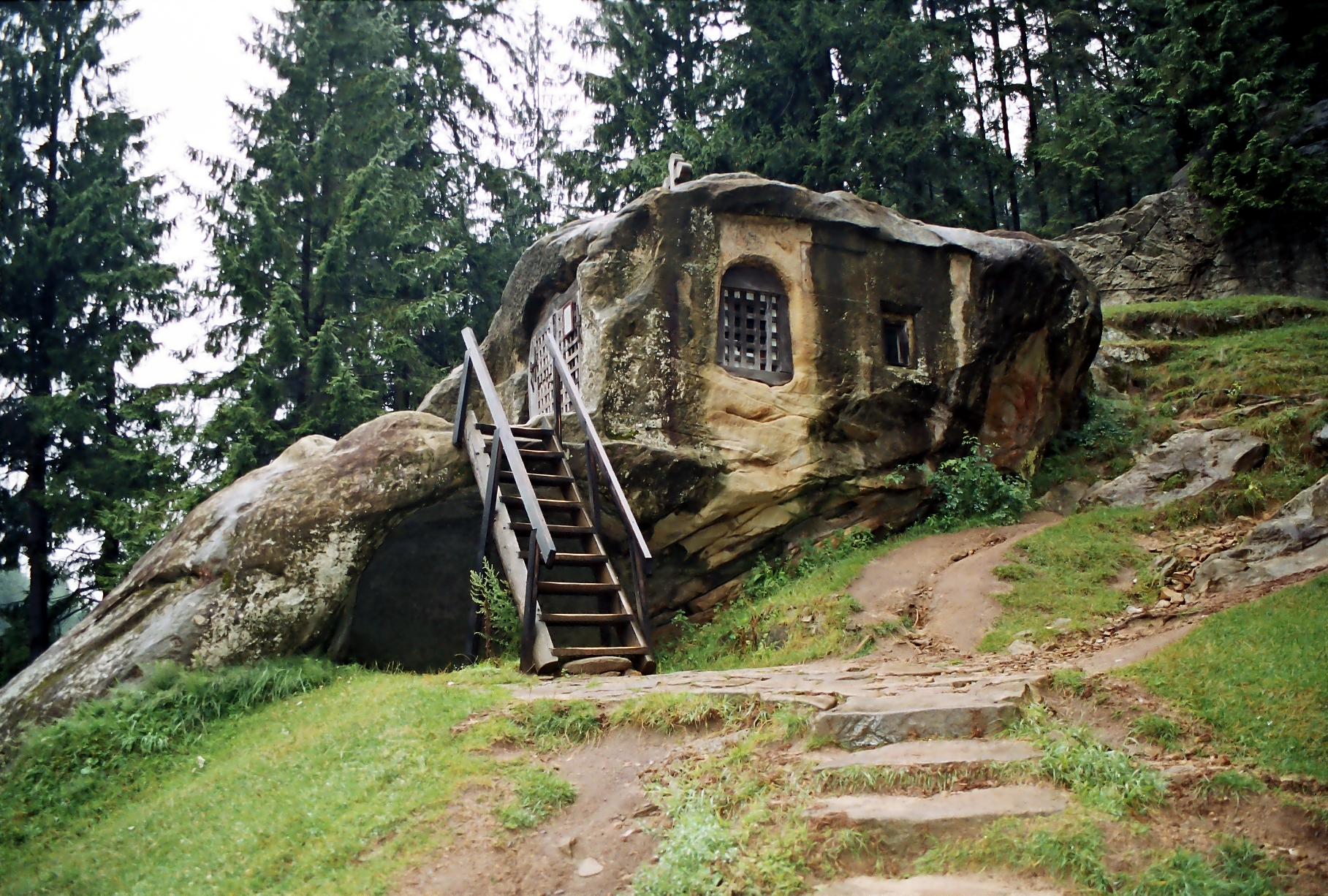
Daniil Sihastrul's hermit house

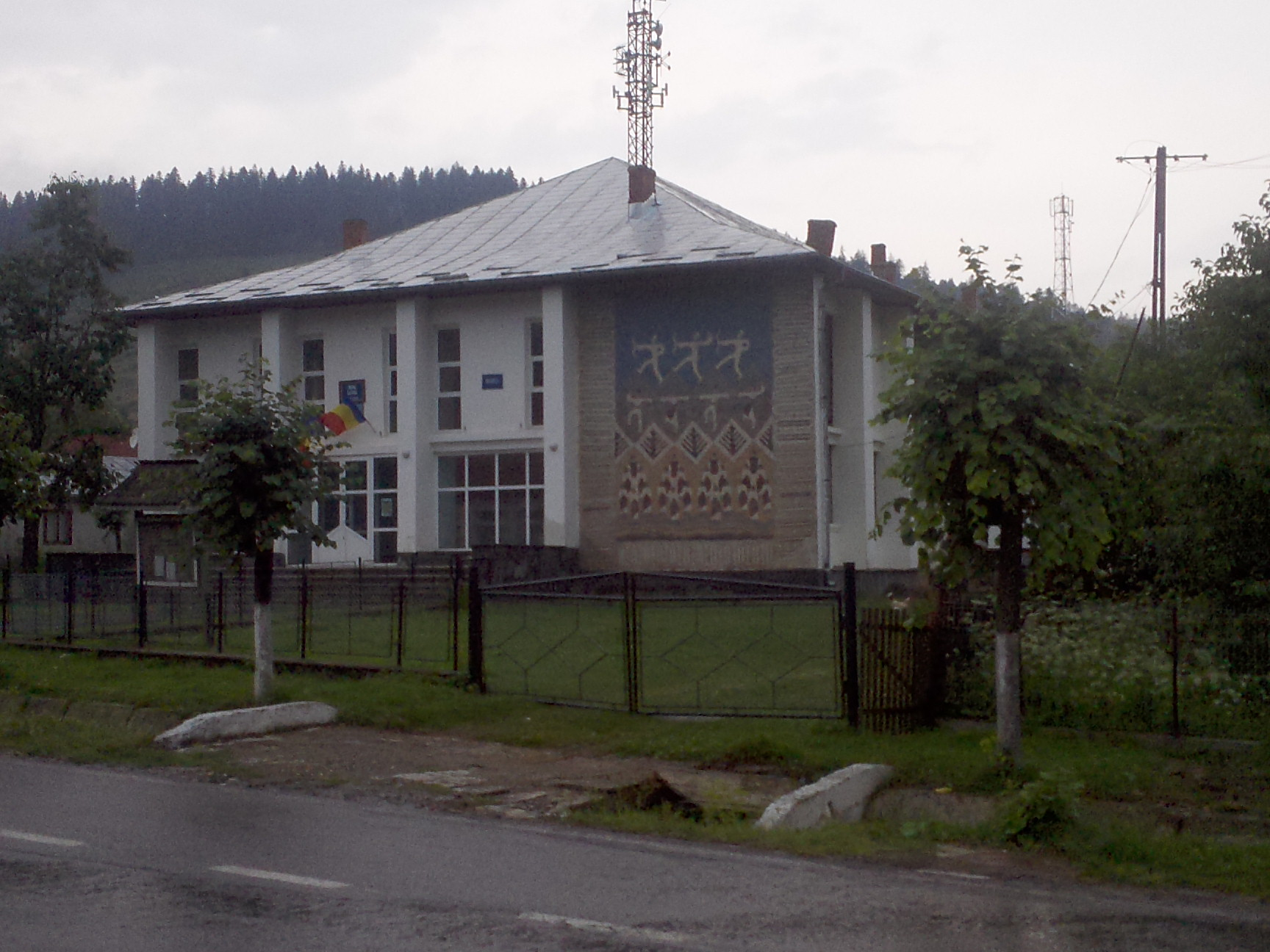
Culture House in Putna (2011)

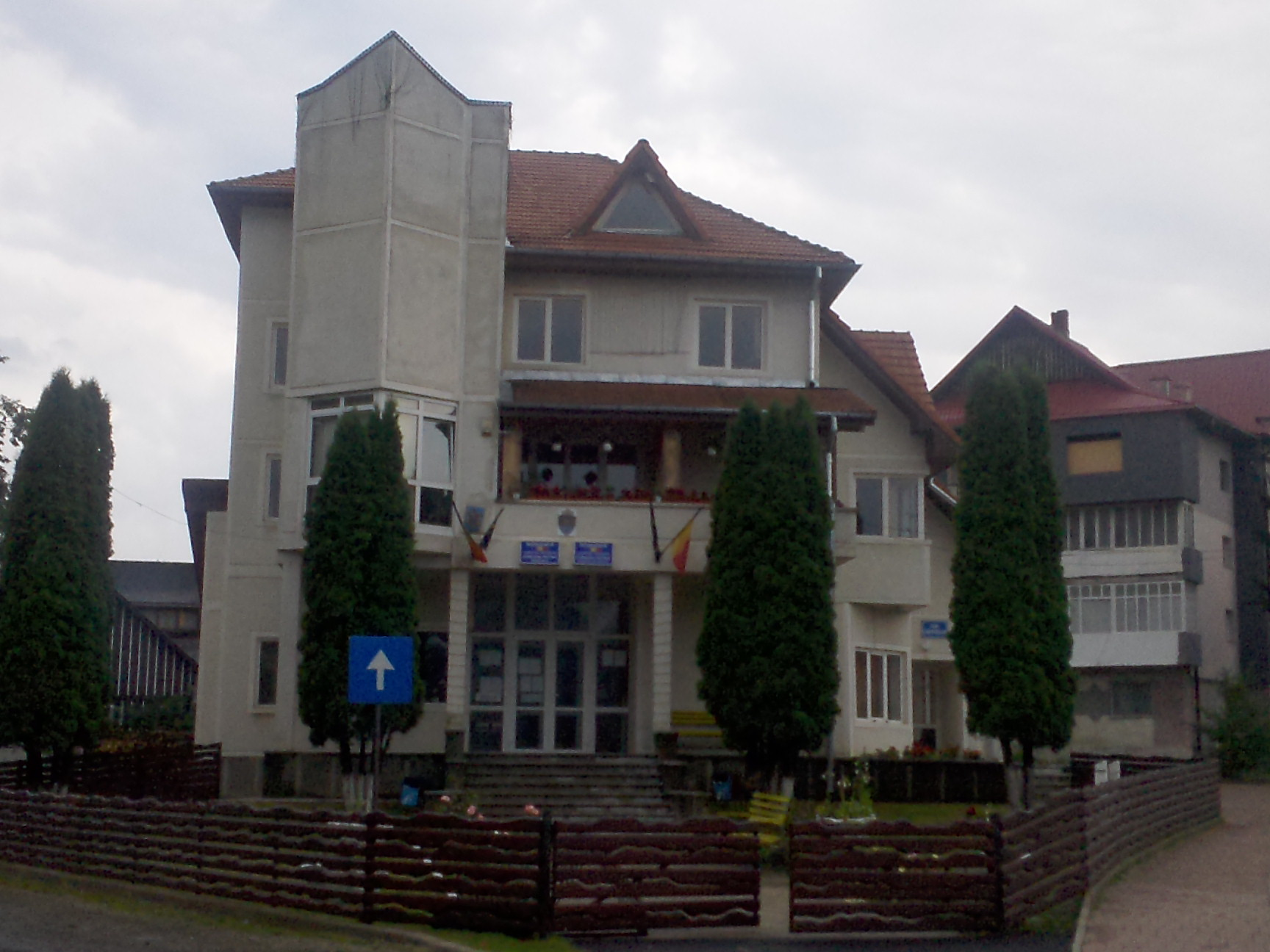
Putna town hall and the local council of the commune
