= Chernivtsi =

City in Chernivtsi Oblast, Ukraine

Chernivtsi Чернівці Cernăuți
- City
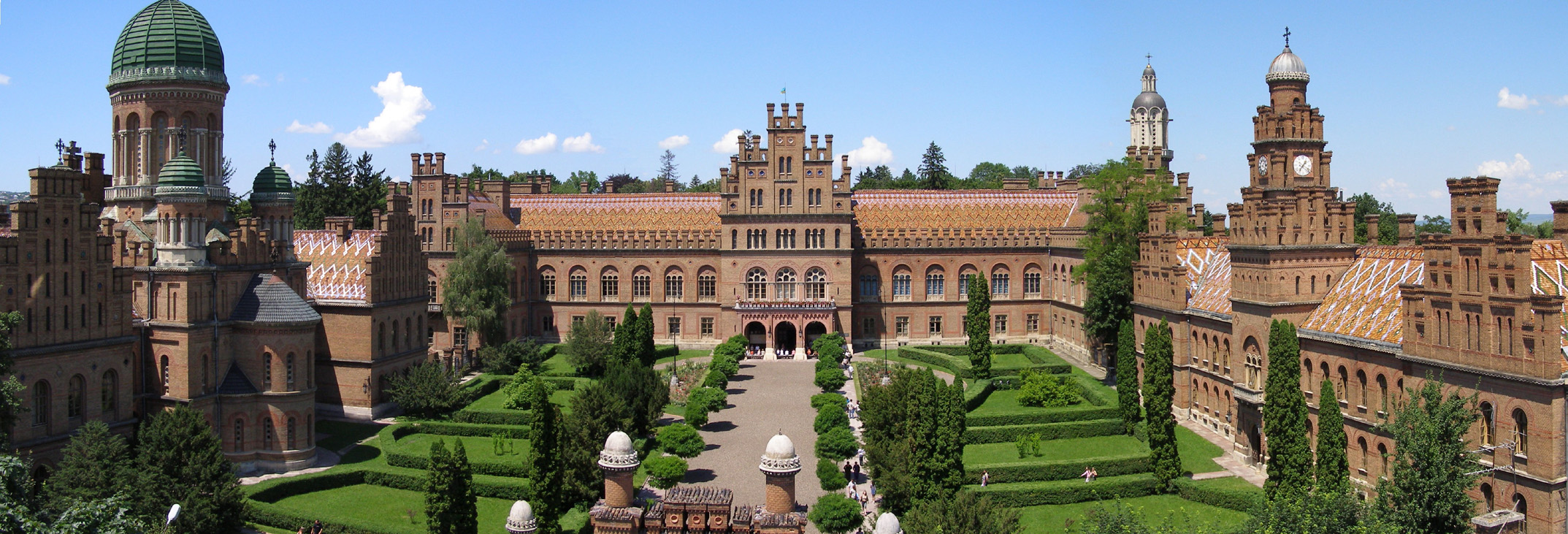
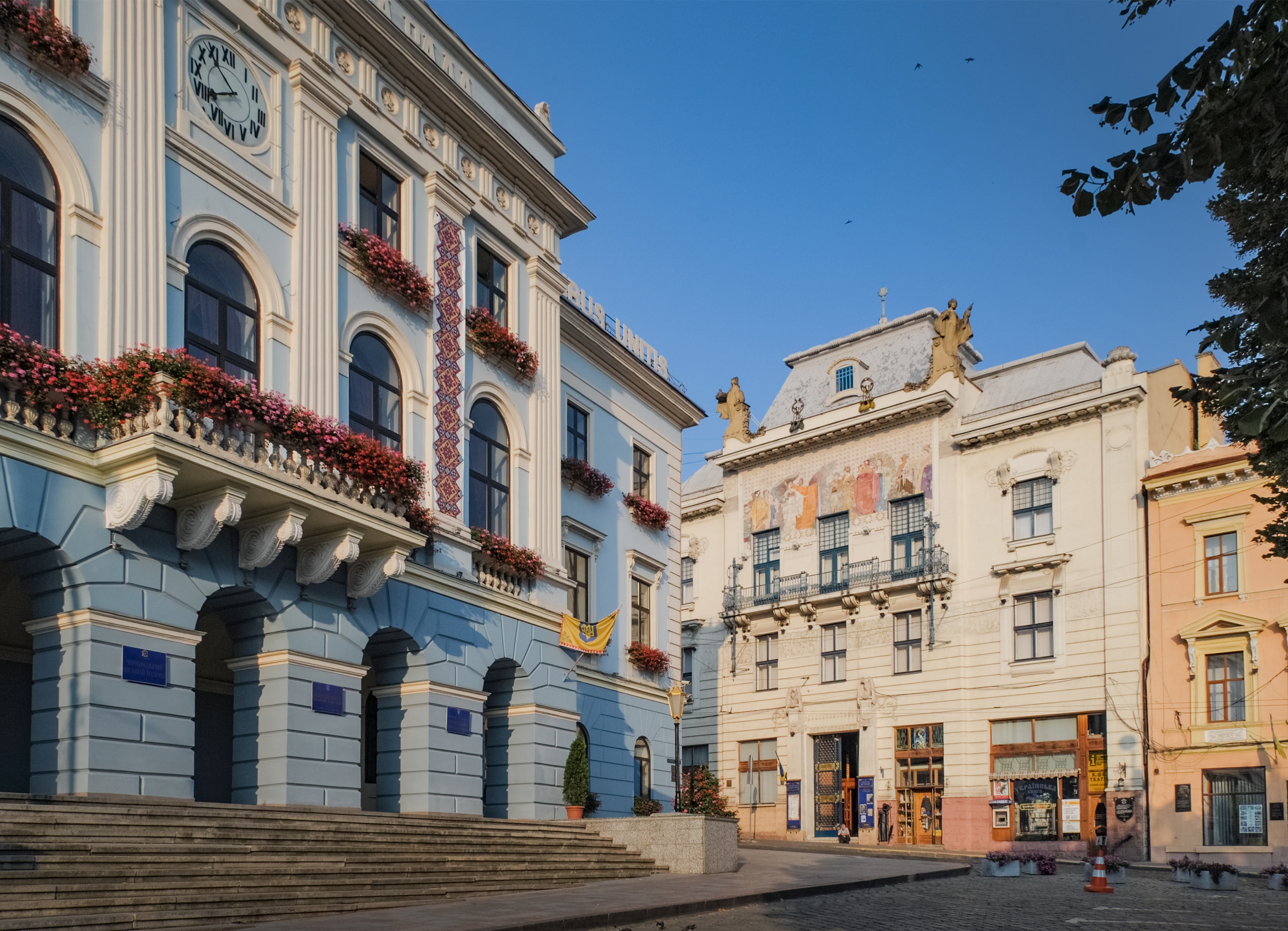
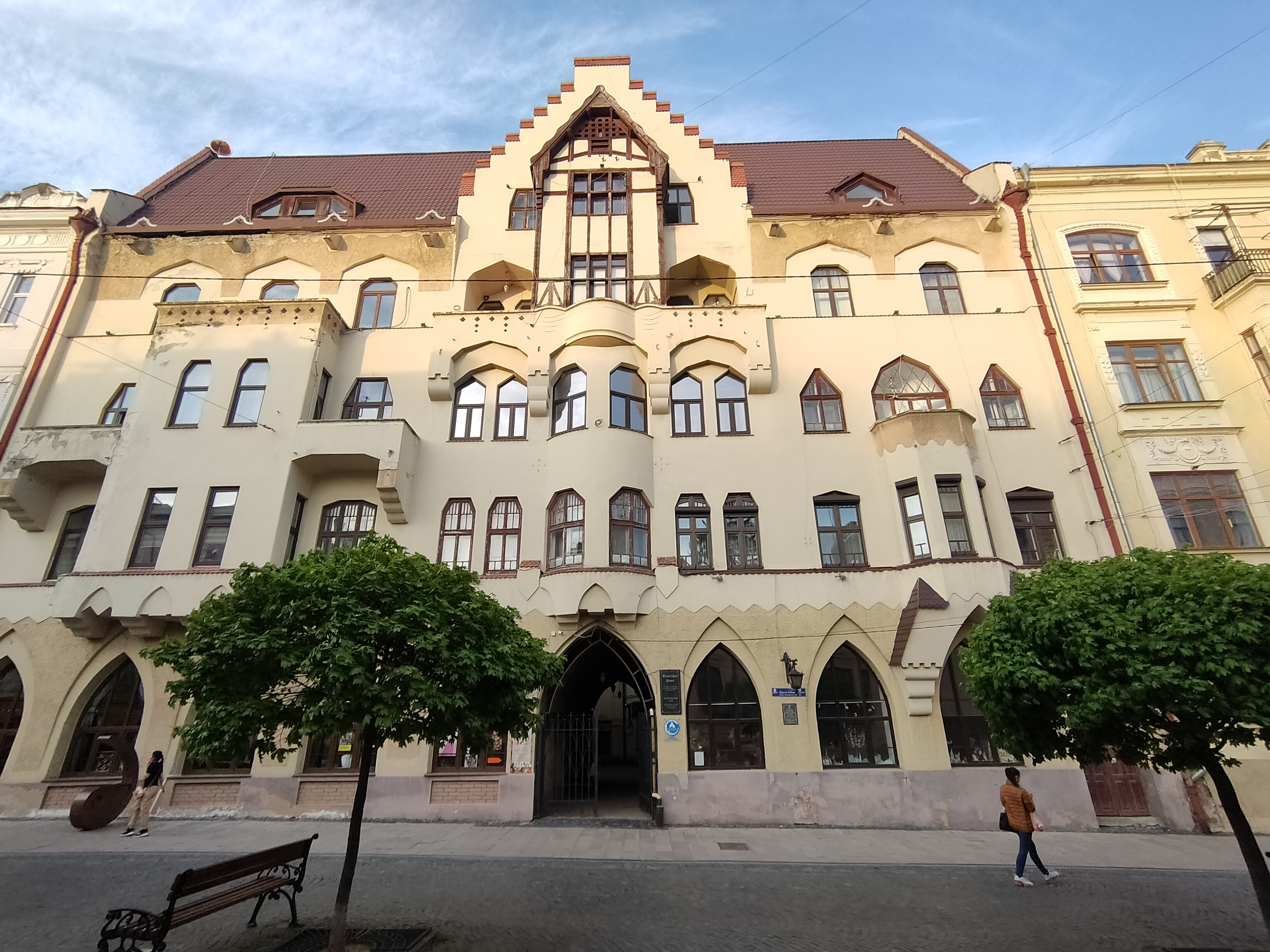
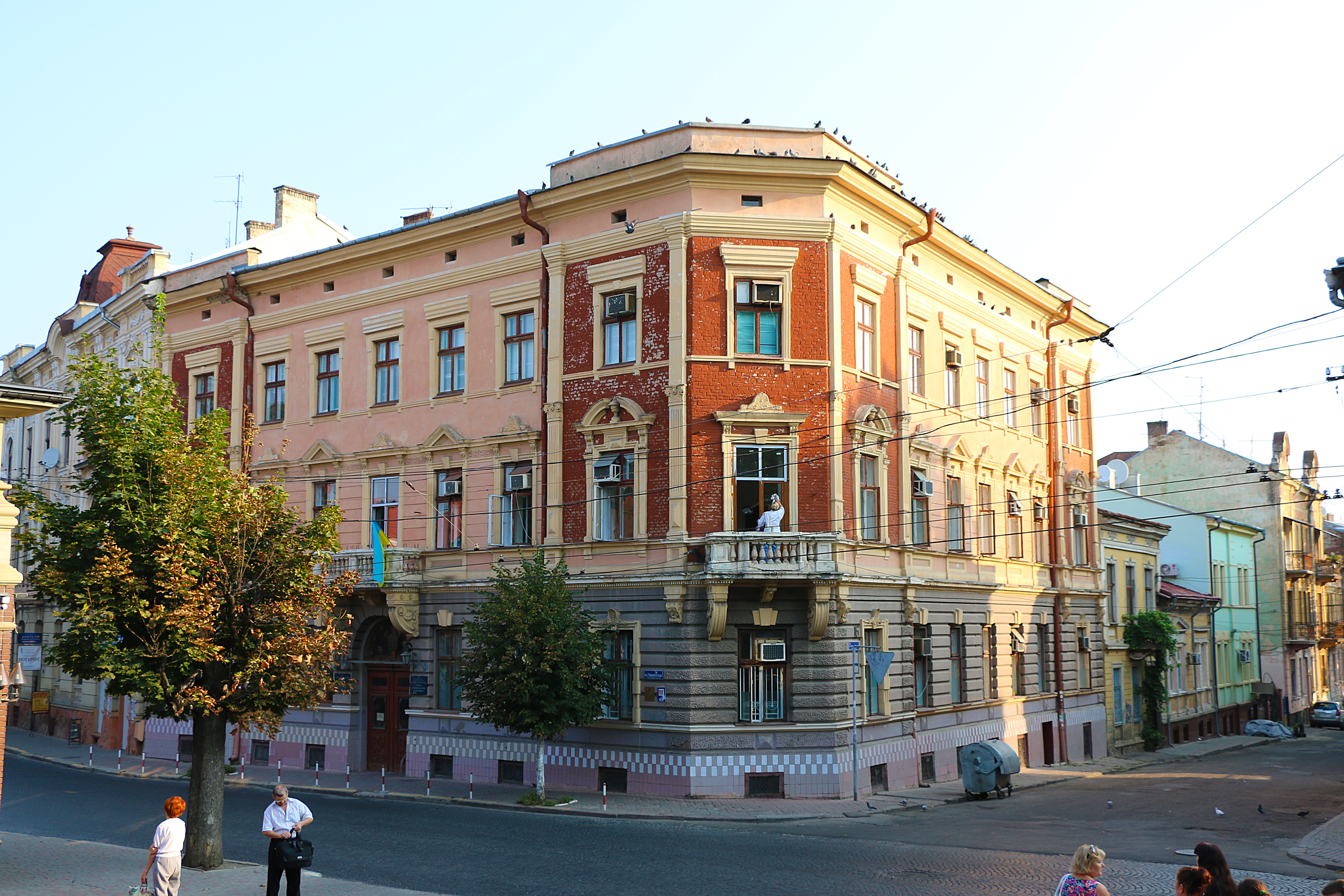
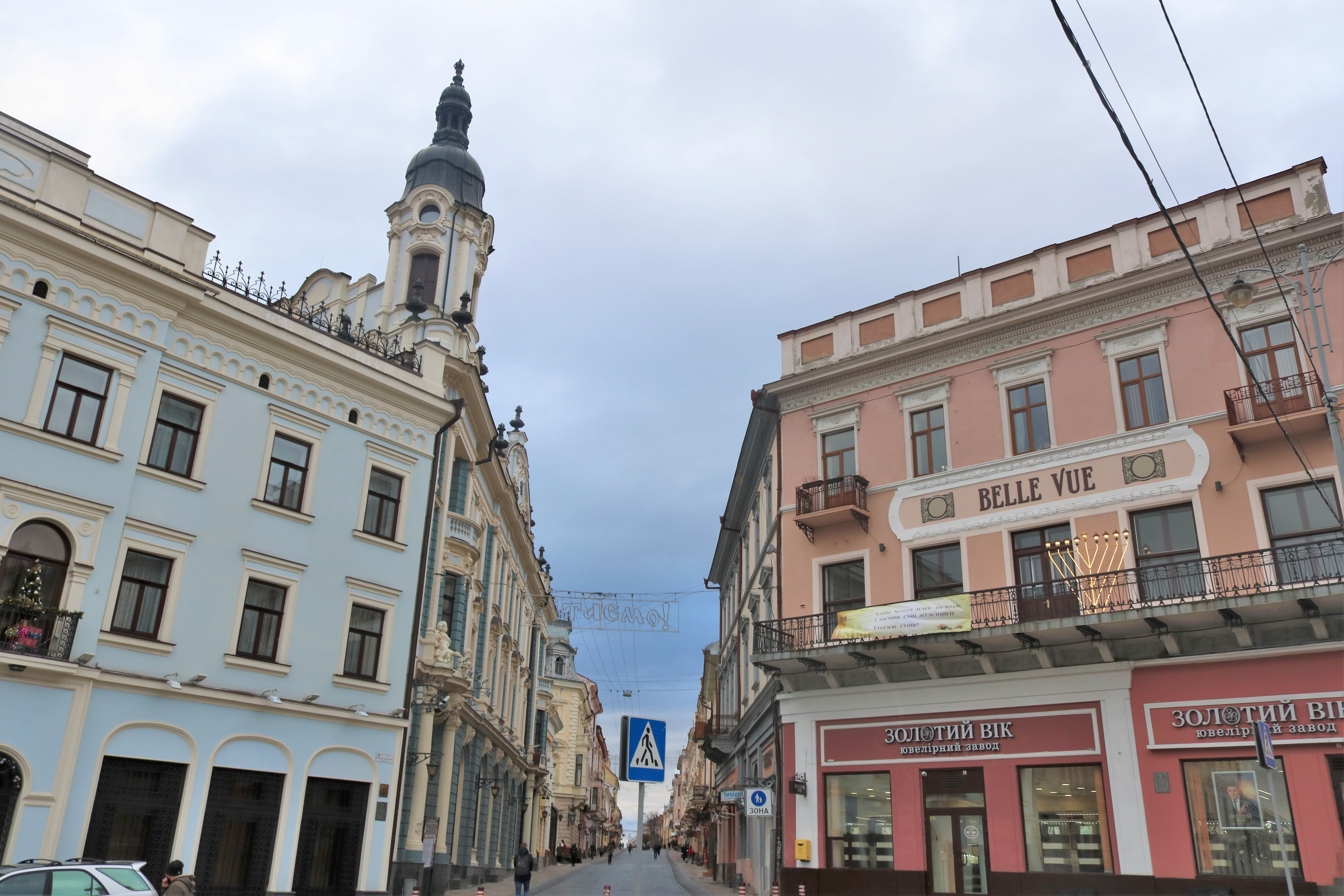
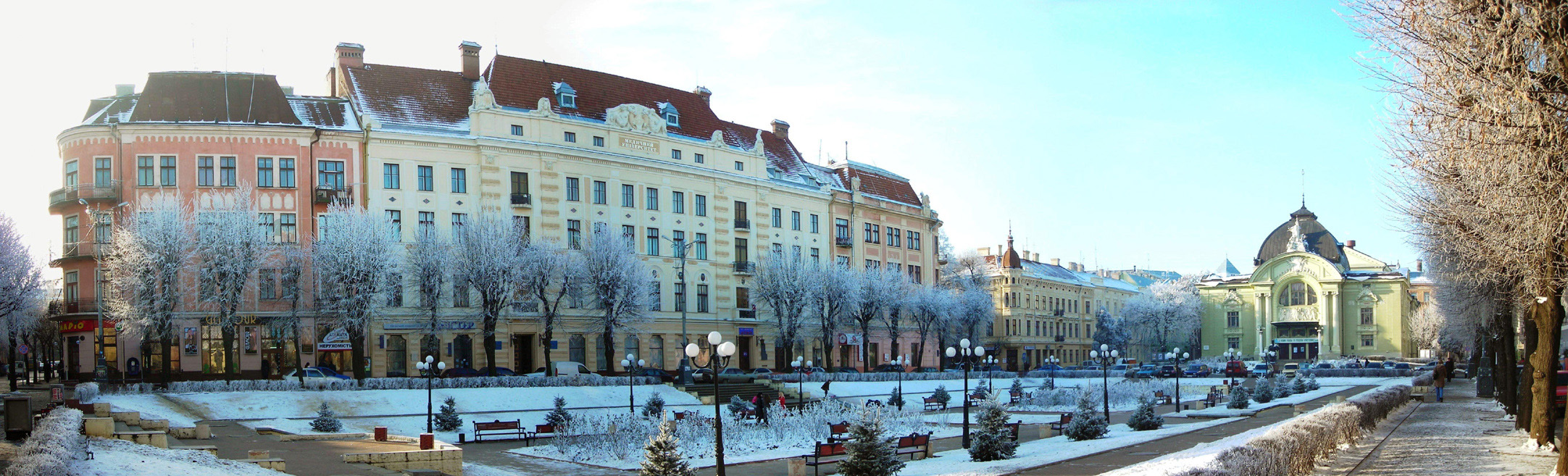
- Residence of Bukovinian and Dalmatian Metropolitans housing the Chernivtsi University Town Hall and Art Museum German People's House Hotel Pension City Olha Kobylianska Street Theatre Square

- Flag Coat of arms
- Nickname: "Little Vienna"
- Location of Chernivtsi in Chernivtsi Oblast Location of Chernivtsi in Ukraine
- Coordinates: 48°18′0″N 25°56′0″E
- Country: Ukraine
- Oblast: Chernivtsi Oblast
- Raion: Chernivtsi Raion
- Hromada: Chernivtsi urban hromada
- First mentioned: 1408
- City rights: 14th century

Government
  - Mayor: Roman Klichuk (United Alternative)

Area
  - Total: 153 km^{2} (59 sq mi)
- Elevation: 248 m (814 ft)

Population (2022)
  - Total: 264,298
  - Density: 1,730/km^{2} (4,470/sq mi)
- Time zone: UTC+2 (EET)
  - Summer (DST): UTC+3 (EEST)
- Postal code: 58000
- Area code: +380 372
- Vehicle registration: CE/26
- Sister cities: Salt Lake City, Konin, Suceava, Nazareth Illit, Saskatoon, Klagenfurt
- Website: city.cv.ua travel.chernivtsi.ua/en

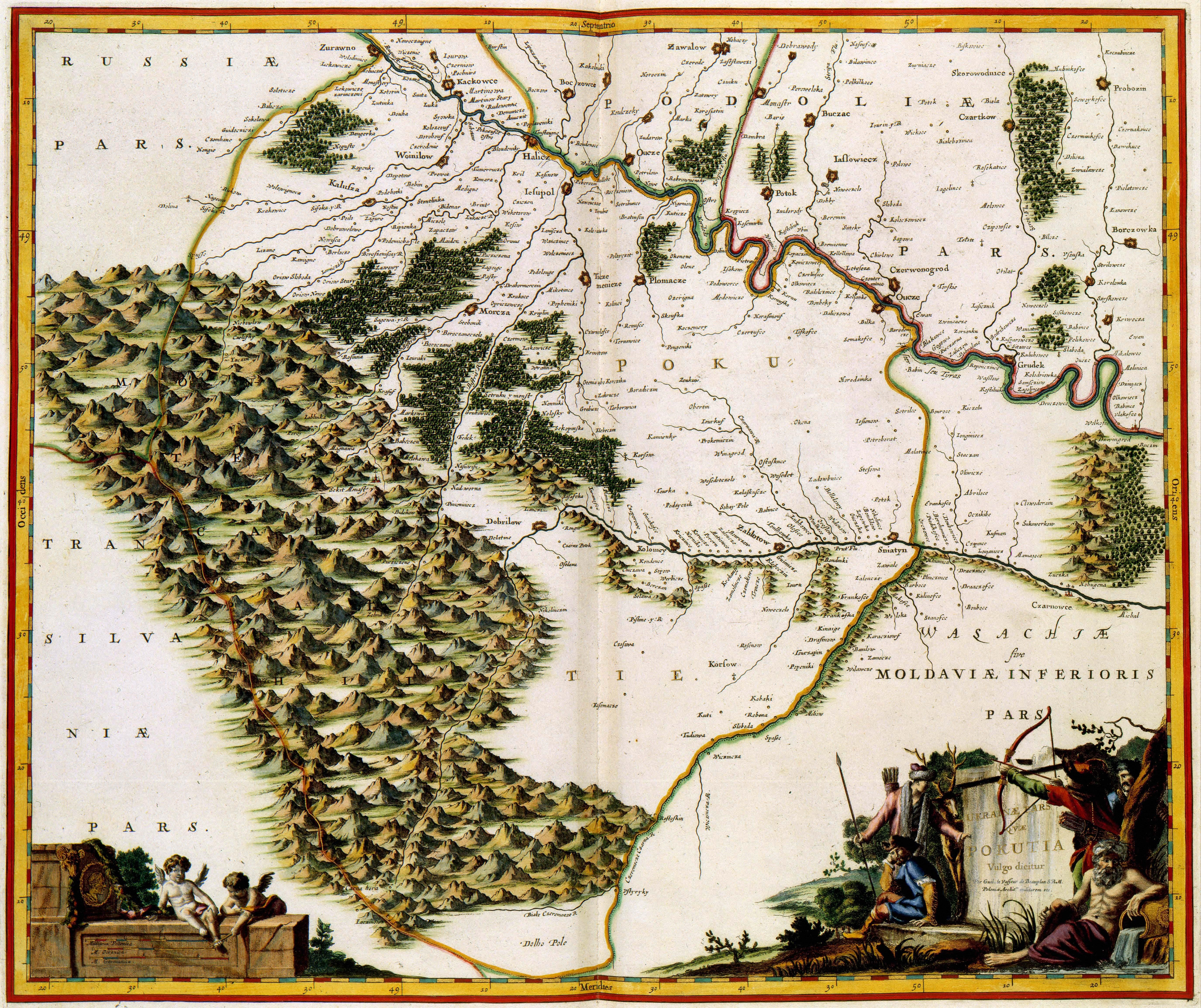
"Czarnowce" on a 1639 Beauplan map centered on Pokuttia; placed in "Wallachia or Little Moldavia", bottom right

Chernivtsi (Ukrainian: Чернівці, pronounced [tʃern⁽ʲ⁾iu̯ˈts⁽ʲ⁾i]; Romanian: Cernăuți, pronounced [tʃernəˈutsʲ]; see also other names) is a city in southwestern Ukraine on the upper course of the Prut River. Formerly the capital of the historic region of Bukovina, which is now divided between Romania and Ukraine, Chernivtsi serves as the administrative center for the Chernivtsi urban hromada, the Chernivtsi Raion, and the oblast itself. The Chernivtsi population is 264,298 (2022 estimate), and the latest census in 2001 was 240,600.

The first document that refers to this city dates back to 1408, when Chernivtsi was a town in the region of Moldavia. Initially a defensive fortification, it became the center of Bukovina in 1488. In 1538, the Principality of Moldavia came under Polish suzerainty. Later it came under the rule of Ottoman Empire, formally remaining under Moldavian control until 1774, when Austria took control of Bukovina in the aftermath of the Russo-Turkish War. Until 1848 Chernivtsi (known at that time as Czernowitz) was the center of Galicia's Bukovina District, and afterwards served as the capital of the Duchy of Bukovina. In the aftermath of World War I, Romania united with Bukovina in 1918, which led to the city regaining its Romanian name of Cernăuți; this lasted until the Soviets occupied Bessarabia and Northern Bukovina. Chernivtsi was under the control of the Soviet Union from 1940 to 1941, after which Romania recovered the city, and then again from 1944 until the dissolution of the Soviet Union, after which it became part of independent Ukraine.

Chernivtsi is viewed as one of Western Ukraine's main cultural centers. The city is also considered one of Ukraine's important educational and architectural sites. Historically a cosmopolitan community, Chernivtsi was once dubbed "Little Vienna" and "Jerusalem upon the Prut". The city is a major regional rail and road transportation hub, also housing an international airport.

== Names and etymology ==
Late medieval accounts refer to what was then a Galicia–Volhynian fortress-city as Chern', or "the black city"; it is said to owe its name to the black color of the city walls, built from dark oak layered with local black-colored soil.

In "Documents of Western Russia" (Russian: Акты Западной России) published in Saint Petersburg in 1846 (Volume 1, page 32, document #21), the city is mentioned as Chernov'tsi (Russian: Черновьци).

Aside from its modern Ukrainian name of Chernivtsi, the city has also been known by several different names in various languages, which still are used by the respective population groups much as they used to be throughout the city's history, either in connection with the rule by one country or another or independently from it:

- Romanian: Cernăuți ([tʃernəˈutsʲ]);
- German: Czernowitz ([ˈtʃɛɐ̯novɪts]);
- Polish: Czerniowce ([/t͡ʂɛrˈɲɔf.t͡sɛ/]);
- Hungarian: Csernovic;
- Yiddish: טשערנאָוויץ, romanized: Tshernovits;
- Russian: Черновцы́, romanized: Chernovtsy, (in Russian until 1944: Чернови́цы, romanized: Chernovitsy);
- Ukrainian: Чернівці, romanized: Chernivtsi, (in Ukrainian until 1944: Черновиці, romanized: Chernovytsi);

In English, the city was usually referred to as Czernowitz before 1918 (under Austrian rule), Cernăuți from 1918 to 1944 (Romanian rule) and Chernovtsy from 1944 to 1991 (Soviet rule).

== History ==
Historical affiliations

City of Chern :
Principality of Galicia second half of XII-1199
Kingdom of Galicia–Volhynia 1199–1241
Golden Horde 1241–1342
Moldavia 1346–1408
Destruction of Chern, first mention of Chernivtsi (1408) :
Moldavia 1408–1775
Habsburg Monarchy 1775–1804
Austrian Empire 1804–1867
Austria-Hungary 1867–1918
West Ukrainian People's Republic 1918
Kingdom of Romania 1918–1940
Ukrainian SSR 1940–1941
Kingdom of Romania 1941–1944
Ukrainian SSR 1944–1991
Ukraine 1991–present

=== Prehistory ===
Archaeological evidence discovered in the area surrounding Chernivtsi indicates that a population inhabited it since the Neolithic era. Later settlements included those of the Cucuteni-Trypillian culture, the Corded Ware culture; artifacts from the Bronze and Iron Ages were also found in the city. In the Middle Ages there lived East Slavic tribes White Croats and Tivertsi.

=== Under Principality of Halych ===
A fortified settlement located on the left (north-eastern) shore of the Prut in a modern-day Chernivtsi dates back to the time of the Principality of Halych and is thought to have been built by Grand Prince Yaroslav Osmomysl. This early stronghold was destroyed during the Mongol invasion of Europe by Boroldai in 1259. However, the remaining ramparts of the fortress were still used for defense purposes; in the 17th century they were augmented with several bastions, one of which is still extant.

Following the destruction of the fortress, later settlements in the area centered on the right (south-western) shore of the Prut River, at a more strategically advantageous, elevated location. In 1325, when the Kingdom of Poland seized control of Galicia, and came into contact with the early Vlach (Romanian) feudal formations, a fort was mentioned under the name Țețina; it was defending the ford and crossing point on the Prut River. It was part of a group of three fortifications; the other two being the fortress of Hotin on the Dniester to the east, and a fort on the Kolachin River, an upriver tributary of Prut.

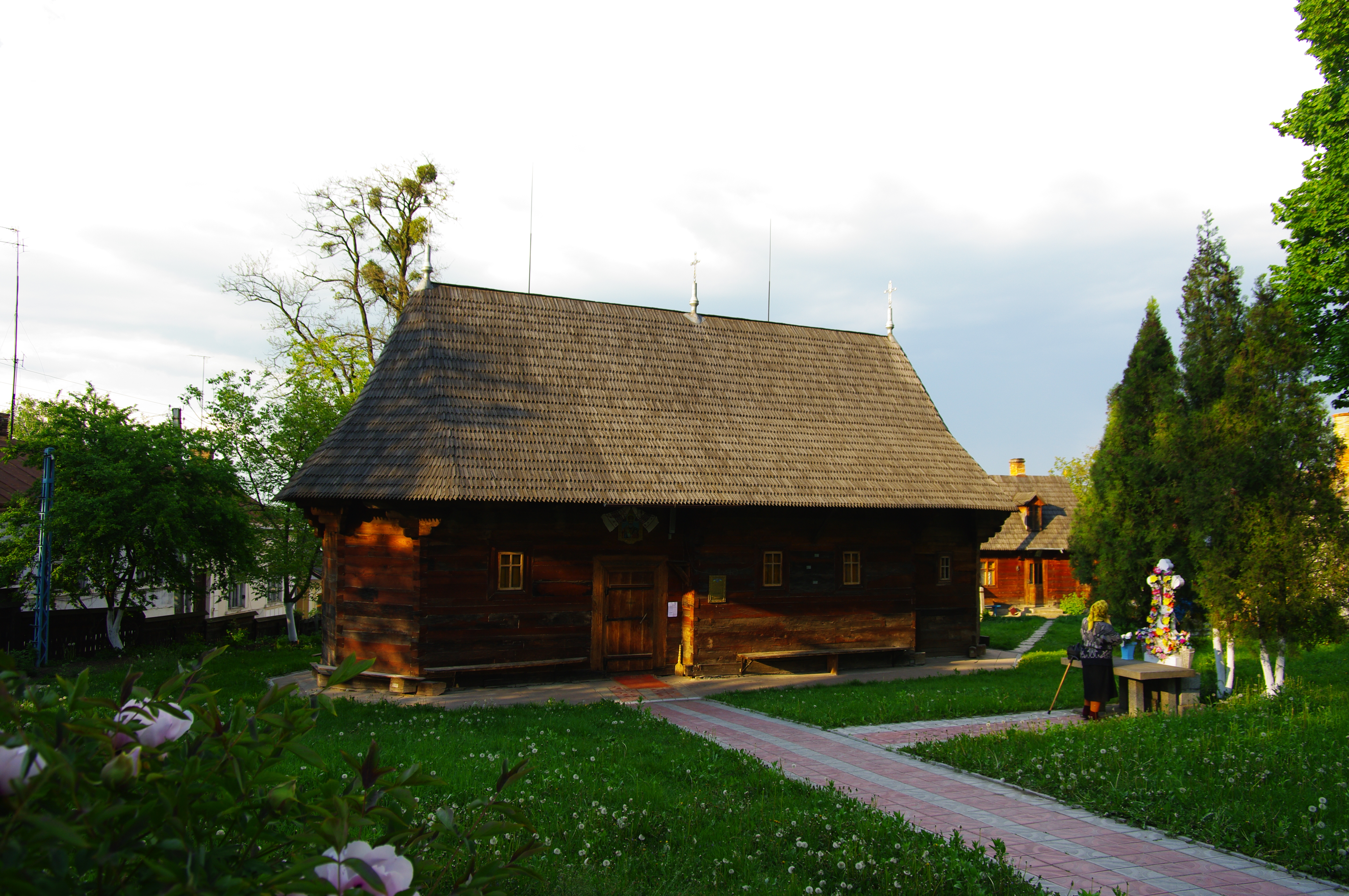
Saint Nicholas wooden church in Chernivtsi (early 17th century)

=== Under the Principality of Moldavia ===
Between 1359 and 1775, the city and its surroundings were part of the Principality of Moldavia, one of the historic provinces of Romania; the city being the administrative center of the homonymous ținut (county). The name Cernăuți is first attested in a document by Alexandru cel Bun (Alexander the Good) on 8 October 1408. In Ottoman sources, the city was mentioned as "Çernovi".

=== Under Austro-Hungarian rule ===
Map of the United States of Greater Austria, proposed in 1906, shows the city at the border of the areas inhabited by Romanians and Ukrainians.

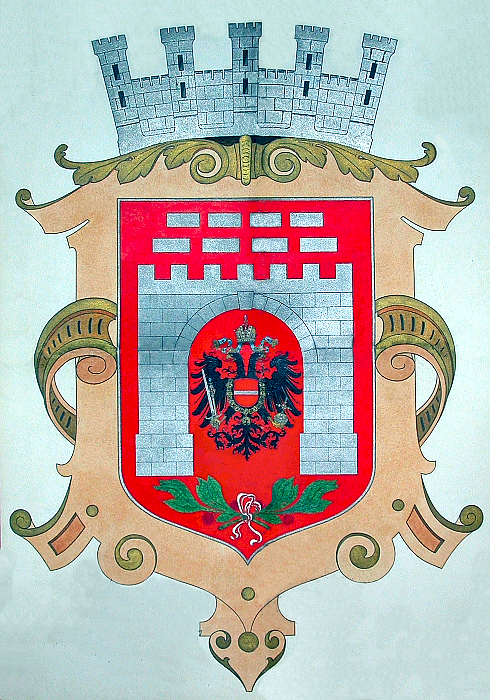
The city's coat of arms until 1918

In 1775, the northwestern part of the territory of Moldavia was annexed by the Habsburg Empire; this region became known as Bukovina. The city became the region's capital, organized as the Bukovina District part of the Kingdom of Galicia and Lodomeria, which in 1849 was raised in status and became known as the Duchy of Bukovina, a crownland of the Austrian Empire. The city received Magdeburg rights. The city began to flourish in 1778 when Knight Karl von Enzenberg was appointed the chief of the Military Administration. He invited many merchants, craftsmen and entrepreneurs to help develop trade and other businesses. Saint Peter's Fairs (1–15 July) had given a new vibrant impulse to the market development from 1786. In the late 19th century the German language—due to the Habsburg and the very important Jewish influence—became the lingua franca and more and more newspapers were edited in German, also a remarkable literary production in German began in this period, featuring most prominently Karl Emil Franzos.

During the Moldavian Revolution of 1848, while meeting in Czernowitz, Moldavian liberals formed Comitetul Revoluţionar Moldovean (the Moldavian Revolutionary Committee) and commissioned Mihail Kogălniceanu to draw up a new statement of principles, Dorinţele partidei naţionale din Moldova ("The Wishes of the National Party in Moldavia"), published in August. More liberal than the 9 April petition, it called for an elected assembly with extensive powers, including the right to initiate legislation, and expanded the local autonomy of judeţe, cities and rural communes. Kogălniceanu also drafted a constitution, Proiectul de Constituţie, which rendered the legislature the dominant branch of government, allowing it to vote taxes, draw up the annual state budget, stimulate agriculture, industry and commerce, reform laws, elect the prince, and choose the metropolitan and bishops of the Orthodox Church. Kogălniceanu, a future Prime Minister of Romania, proposed that all orders of society be represented in the assembly, without calling for universal suffrage. Instead he proposed the creation of electoral college, giving the upper classes predominant power. Like most of his colleagues, he felt obliged to remain mindful of his era's social and political realities by recognizing the boyars continued leading role and limiting the participation of peasants due to their lack of education and experience. Among the Moldavian exiles in Czernowitz were also Vasile Alecsandri, Gheorghe Sion and Alexandru Ioan Cuza.

=== West Ukrainian People's Republic ===
During the 19th and early 20th century, Chernivtsi became a center of both Ukrainian and Romanian national movements. In 1908, it was the site of the first Yiddish language conference, the Czernowitz Conference, coordinated by Nathan Birnbaum. In 1910, Romanians and Ukrainians were almost in equal numbers with the Romanians concentrated mainly in the south and the Ukrainians mainly in the north. When Austria-Hungary dissolved in 1918 after its defeat in World War I, two years of political uncertainty followed. During the short period of time, West Ukrainian People's Republic, was proclaimed in Lviv on 1 November 1918. Prior to that, on 14/27 October 1918 Ukrainian Bukovina executive committee was created, a constituent assembly to whom the Austrian governor of the province subsequently handed power. In November, committee took power and controlled the Ukrainian part of Bukovina, consisting of Northern Bukovina, and including the city of Chernivtsi, Zastavna, Vashkivtsi, Vyzhnytsia.

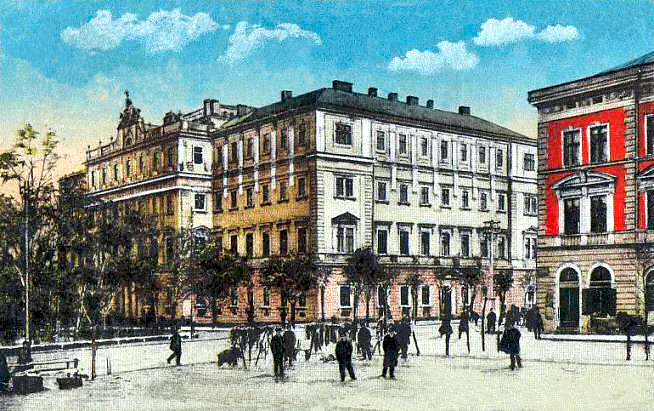
Building of Ukrainian Bukovina Regional Committee, former Seat of the state government of the Duchy of Bukovina

On 3 November 1918, a large Ukrainian Bukovina Viche was held in Chernivtsi, at which the majority voted for reunification with the West Ukrainian People's Republic proclaimed in Lviv. It has further unanimously expressed a strong protest against the annexation of Bukovina to the Kingdom of Romania, and elected Omelian Popovych as a chairman of the Ukrainian Regional Committee. On 6 November 1918, Ukrainians took over power in Chernivtsi, Yosyp Bezpalko was appointed as a mayor of the city. At that time, a 2.5 thousand corps of Ukrainian Sich Riflemen were stationed in the city.

Map of Ukraine proposed at the Paris Peace Conference, showing Chernivtsi as territory of the Ukrainian People's Republic

=== Chernivtsi under Romanian rule ===
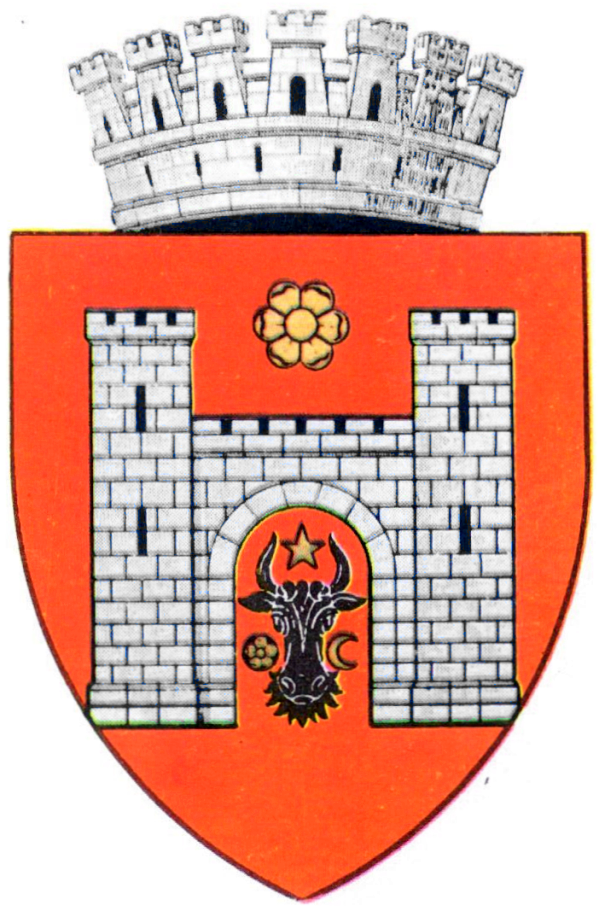
The city's coat of arms from 1918 to 1940 and from 1941 to 1944

From 11 November to 19 December 1918, the Romanian army takes over Chernivtsi (Cernăuți) and formalizes Bukovina's annexation. As the aftermath of World War I, Bukovina together with Chernivtsi was recognised and became a part of the Kingdom of Romania, which gained worldwide diplomatic recognition by the end of 1920 as an aftermath of unsuccessful Ukrainian War of Independence, as West Ukrainian People's Republic was crushed down together with Ukrainian People's Republic by its neighbors. During those two years, even most city residents did not know of which country they were citizens, with most assuming Czernowitz still belonged to Austria-Hungary. German remained the lingua franca of the city and its suburbs for another decade. In 1930, the city reached a population of 112,400. While Romanians formed the majority of Bukovina's diverse population in 1930, the ethnic composition of Chernivtsi City had a Jewish majority (hence the nickname "Jerusalem on the Pruth"). Jews made up 44.5% of the population, followed by Romanians at 25.5%, Ukrainians at 16.7%, Germans at 6.4%, and Poles at 4.9%. The remaining population consisted of Russians, Romani, Hungarians, and other smaller ethnic groups.

=== Soviet occupation and World War 2 ===
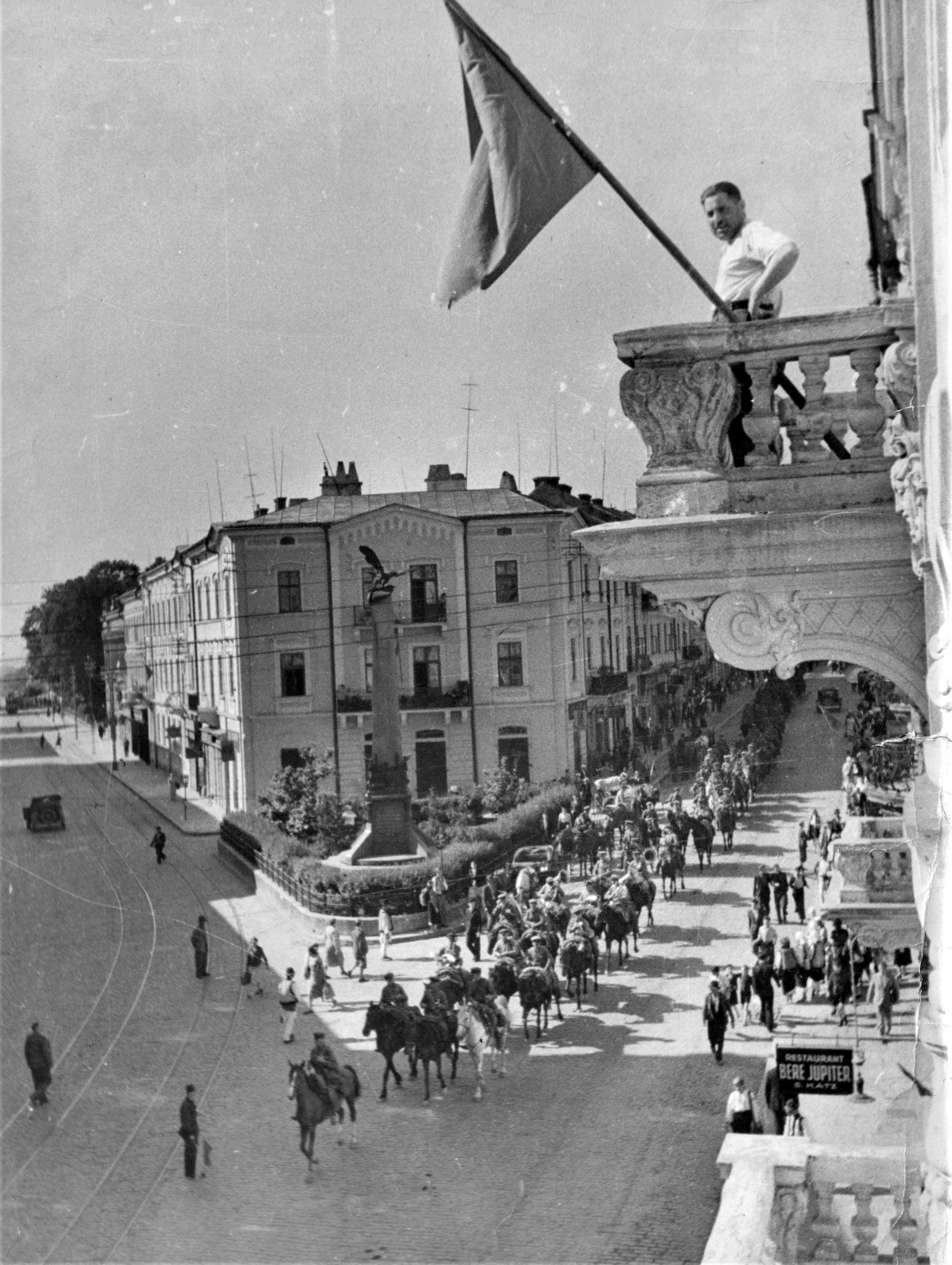
Soviet occupation troops entering Chernivtsi in 1940

In 1940, the Red Army occupied the area; the area around the city became known as Chernivtsi Oblast, and was allotted to the Ukrainian SSR by the Soviet Union. The city's large Romanian intelligentsia found refuge in Romania and those that remained faced repression; while the Bukovina Germans were "repatriated" according to a Soviet-Nazi agreement. During a meeting of the Central Committee All-Union Communist Party held on 9 September 1940, Joseph Stalin stated: "I like the city, Chernivtsi. I've been there, I've seen it." Stalin most likely visited the city during the Austro-Hungarian rule. On 13 June 1941, 8,374 people (mostly Romanians) were deported from the Chernivtsi oblast of Ukraine and 3,767 from the Izmail oblast of Ukraine (southern Bessarabia). According to Nikolai Bougai's research in the Soviet archives, out of those deported from the Chernivtsi and Izmail oblasts, only 9,595 (79.03%) were still alive in September 1941. While he did not list any precise data for the city of Chernivtsi or Chernivtsi oblast, only 1,136 of those deported from the Izmail oblast (30.16%) of Soviet Ukraine were still alive in 1951. According to some sources, a majority of the deportees of 1941 died in the Soviet north and east.

Under the regime of military dictator Ion Antonescu, Romania had switched from an ally of France and Britain to one of Nazi Germany; subsequently, in July 1941, the Romanian Army retook the city as part of the Axis attack on the Soviet Union during World War II. Chernivtsi would become the capital of the Romanian Bukovina Governorate.

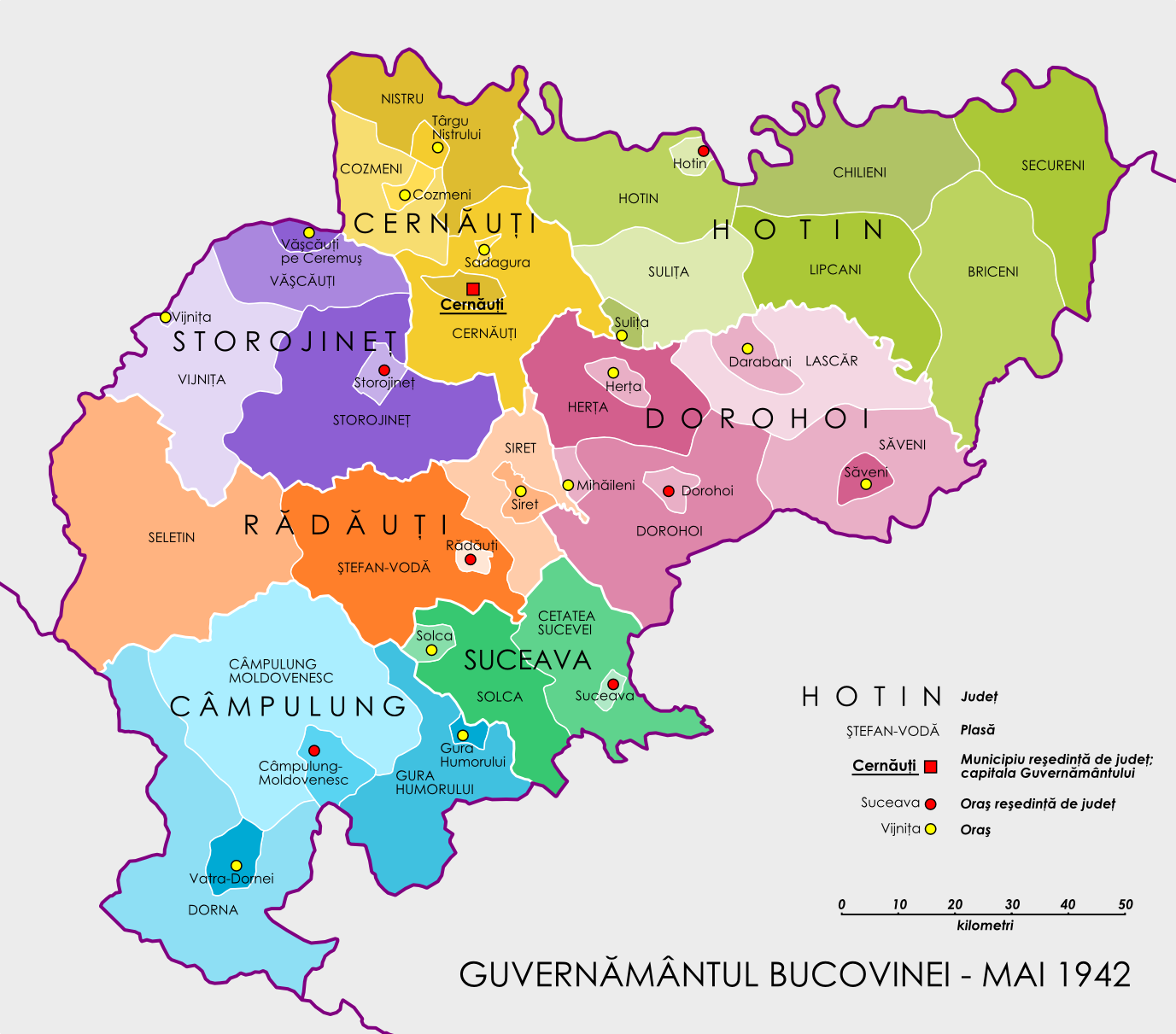
Administrative map of the Governorate of Bukovina as of May 1942

In August 1941, Antonescu ordered the creation of a ghetto in the lowland part of the city, where 50,000 Bukovina Jews were crammed, two-thirds of whom would be deported in October 1941 and early 1942 to Transnistria, where the majority of the deportees died. About 60% of the deportees to Transnistria from the city of Chernivtsi perished according to the Jewish Virtual Library. According to Gali Mir-Tibon, most of the Jews deported from the city of Chernivtsi to Transnistria did not survive. According to the Yad Vashem database, 19,424 Jews who had lived in Chernivtsi before the war whose names are listed died in the Holocaust. According to the Yad Vashem database, the number of Jews who had lived in Chernivtsi before the war and were killed in the city during the Holocaust was 2,478. The number of Jews who were killed in the city of Chernivtsi itself, regardless of the place of prewar residence, was 3,372 according to the Yad Vashem database, with names included. Most of these Jews who died in the city were killed by the German Einsatzgruppe D. The total number of Chernivtsi Jews killed by the SS (Einsatzgruppe D) in July and August 1941 was 3,106 according to the Einsatzgruppen reports, while the Romanians killed 400, though survivor testimonies suggest that perhaps more people were killed. According to Ruth Glasberg, a survivor and eyewitness of the massacre and of the deportations to Transnistria, "thousands of people were killed in the street and in houses by the Germans and Legionaires (i.e., members and supporters of the fascist Legion of the Archangel Michael).

The Romanian mayor of the city Traian Popovici managed to persuade Ion Antonescu to raise the number of Jews exempted from deportation from 200 to 20,000. Dorimedont Popovici (see Dorimedont Popovici ), the uncle of Traian Popovici, the vice-president of the National Council of Bukovina, member of the Romanian parliament and cabinet minister, originally from the People's Party and then from the National Peasant Party, also intervened with Ion Antonescu for the stopping of the deportations of Jews from Bukovina and other things through a 74-page memorandum; there were also other similar interventions. Another major figure who intervened in favor of the stopping of the deportations of Jews to Transnistria was the Metropolitan of Bukovina, Tit Simedrea (see Tit Simedrea), as it was noted in the first major published book on the Holocaust in English, citing the Chief Rabbi of Romania, Alexandru Safran. In October and November 1941, 28,391 Jews from the city were deported to Transnistria. About 1,500 Jews from Chernivtsi converted to Christianity to be saved from deportation to Transnistria. All the Jews deported from Chernivtsi in 1941, and all of those deported in 1942, were deported by train; half of the transports sent out in 1941, and all the ones from 1942, went to Otaci (Atachi at that time), typically middle-class people, many of whom were able to take lei and valuables into Transnistria (just like the southern Bukovinian Jews), directly on the border with Transnistria, from where they crossed the border into Transnistria, and were not beaten and forced to buy food at high prices in a transit camp. The other half, mostly working class individuals, were sent to the transit camp in Marculesti transit camp, where most gave up much of their jewelry and precious metals in exchange for food, and were often beaten and plundered by Romanian gendarmes, and from where they walked to nearby Atachi to be sent across the river to Transnistria. A further 4,290 Chernivtsi Jews were deported to Transnistria in June 1942. About 16,794 of the Jews were allowed to stay in Chernivtsi after that. Besides the deportations of Jews to Transnistria in June 1942, Bukovina's governor Corneliu Calotescu reported to Ion Antonescu on 21 August 1942, that 147 Jewish Communists were deported to Transnistria, mainly from the city of Chernivtsi; they were not included in the statistics of deported Jews. One of the Jews who remained in the city was Erich Goldhagen (see the page in German at Erich Goldhagen), the father of Daniel Jonah Goldhagen. On 14 March 1944, Romania's military dictator Ion Antonescu allowed the repatriation of all the Jews deported to Transnistria. For more information on the Holocaust in Transnistria, including on the fate of the Jewish deportees from Chernivtsi, see History of the Jews in Transnistria. For more information on the history of the Jews of Bukovina, including during the Holocaust, see History of the Jews in Bukovina.

After 29 March 1944, when Axis forces were driven out by the Red Army, the city was reincorporated into the Ukrainian SSR. Over the following years, most of the Jews emigrated to Israel; the city was an important node in the Berihah network. Bukovina Poles were expelled by the Soviets after World War II. The city became a predominantly Ukrainian one.

=== Independence ===
Since 1991, Chernivtsi has been a part of an independent Ukraine. In May 1999, Romania opened a consulate general in the city.

Until 18 July 2020, Chernivtsi was designated as a city of oblast significance and did not belong to any raion. As part of the administrative reform of Ukraine, which reduced the number of raions of Chernivtsi Oblast to three, the city was merged into Chernivtsi Raion.

=== Russian invasion of Ukraine ===
Since the start of the Russian invasion of Ukraine, the city has been a host for refugees from the fighting in eastern and central Ukraine and a resting point for refugees on their way to nearby Romania. Some Chernivtsi residents have also left the country.

== Symbolics ==
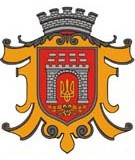
Coat of arms of Chernivtsi

=== Coat of arms ===
The Chernivtsi coat of arms is framed by a bronze ornamental cartouche, and a red heraldic shield depicting an open stone gate with a figured trident in the middle. Under the gate, there are two crossed laurel branches, tied with ribbons. The crown of the symbol is the stone crown.

=== Flag of Chernivtsi ===
The Chernivtsi flag consists of a tree, the top, and a rectangular cloth, the front of which forms framed by a red tooth-like ornament white background with an inscription in Ukrainian in the center, over which there is inscribed in Ukrainian: "Chernivtsi". Under the coat of arms, there is the sign "1408" – the date of the first written mention of the city. On both sides of the coat of arms and all four corners of the field are filled with floral ornaments and with the addition of two beech branches with nuts and leaves. The reverse side is formed by a yellow background with the coat of arms of Ukraine in the center with frames and ornaments similar to the front side.

=== Honorary chain of the mayor of Chernivtsi ===
The mayor's honorary chain is a symbol of Chernivtsi mayor's authority, which is served on behalf of the territorial community. Founded in 1908 and restored in 2008. The symbol is a medallion with the inscription engraved on it: "From Chernivtsi community to freely elected head", on the reverse – "The foundation of a free state is a free community". The medallion is attached to a chain consisting of stylized coats of arms Ukraine, Chernivtsi region and the city of Chernivtsi. The symbol is made of gold colour metal.

=== Medal "To the glory of Chernivtsi" ===
The medal "To the glory of Chernivtsi" is an honorary distinction of the Chernivtsi City Council, introduced to the 600th Anniversary of Chernivtsi (2008) in order to reward individuals who actively contributed to the prosperity of the city and its promotion in Ukraine and the world. The award is made of silver-gilt, it has a circle shape with a diameter of 28 mm (1.1 in). The medal's strip is white with red stripes, which corresponds to the colours of the Chernivtsi flag. At the bottom of the strip, there is a beech branch. The obverse depicts the emblem of Chernivtsi and the inscription – "To the glory of Chernivtsi". On the reverse – the official Chernivtsi logo, designed and approved for the anniversary. The medal is awarded, according to the decision of the executive committee of the City Council, annually during the celebration of the city day.

The official motto of modern Chernivtsi, "Спільними зусиллями!", is a Ukrainian-language version of the Latin Viribus Unitis ("With United Forces"), the personal motto of Franz Joseph, who personally bestowed the right to use it on Chernivtsi. This indicates a special attitude of the emperor to the city. Along with the capital of Bukovina, only the first naval ship of the Austro-Hungarian Navy (SMS Viribus Unitis) was honoured with such honour.

=== Logo of Chernivtsi ===
The official ''Chernivtsi 600'' logo was developed and approved by the anniversary of the city in 2008. It was recognized so successful that it continues to be used. The main idea of components for emblem is based on the antiquity of the city, its exceptional architectural heritage and the hard work of its inhabitants. The symbol is made in the form of a blacksmith's work of art, which testifies to the soundness, prosperity, and success. The color scheme of the logo, represented by dark blue and yellow, has a higher degree of comfortable contrast and coincides with the colors of the State Flag of Ukraine.

In the early 2010s, a new city logo was developed and approved, and at the same time the official slogan was affixed: "Chernivtsi is unique in diversity". Old and new symbols of Chernivtsi were chosen for its creation. To the left, in the foreground, there is a trumpet player who wins the trumpet tune "Marichka". In the middle of the background, there is the town hall. The former Metropolitan Residence of Bukovina and Dalmatia which is recognized as the architectural pearl of the city is pictured to the right in the background.

The colour scheme of the logo represented in orange, blue and red, the name is purple. Such a combination is characteristic of tourism, which uses the notion of happiness, well-being, the joy of relaxation, visualizing positive symbols and images in a colourful, warm and vibrant colour scheme. The new logo uses old symbols from the "Chernivtsi 600" logo.

== Geography ==
Chernivtsi is located in the historic region of Bukovina, which is currently shared between Romania (south) and Ukraine (north). Chernivtsi is located in the southwest of Ukraine, in the eastern Carpathians, on the border between the Carpathians and the East European Plain, 40 km (25 mi) from the border with Romania. The city lies 248 meters (817') above sea level and is surrounded by forests and fields. The River Prut runs through the city's landscape. The city is located in the Eastern European time zone in the region of meridian 26.

Chernivtsi is located at the intersection of the transport arteries: E85, H03, and H10

=== Climate ===
The city is located in a temperate climate zone. The climate is continental with mild winters and warm summers. The average annual temperature is +8.6 °C (47.5 °F), the lowest in January (−2.9 °C; 26.8 °F), the highest – in July (+19.8 °C; 67.6 °F). Winter weather usually comes on 28 November and ends 9 March; summer weather begins on 20 May, and ends on 10 September. The average annual rainfall in Chernivtsi is 621 millimetres (24 1/2 in), with the lowest – in October and January–February, the highest – in June–July. Sometimes there are heavy rains during the summer. Snow cover is formed each winter, but its altitude is insignificant. The average wind speed ranges from 3.3 m/s (7 mph) in July to 4.0 m/s (9 mph) in January. The average annual humidity is 76%.

Climate data for Chernivtsi (1991–2020, extremes 1941–present)
Month	Jan	Feb	Mar	Apr	May	Jun	Jul	Aug	Sep	Oct	Nov	Dec	Year
Record high °C (°F)	17.8 (64.0)	21.3 (70.3)	27.8 (82.0)	30.9 (87.6)	33.5 (92.3)	35.6 (96.1)	37.9 (100.2)	37.7 (99.9)	36.7 (98.1)	31.0 (87.8)	24.9 (76.8)	17.9 (64.2)	37.9 (100.2)
Mean daily maximum °C (°F)	0.3 (32.5)	2.4 (36.3)	8.1 (46.6)	15.4 (59.7)	20.8 (69.4)	24.1 (75.4)	26.0 (78.8)	25.7 (78.3)	20.3 (68.5)	14.0 (57.2)	6.9 (44.4)	1.4 (34.5)	13.8 (56.8)
Daily mean °C (°F)	−2.7 (27.1)	−1.2 (29.8)	3.4 (38.1)	9.9 (49.8)	15.1 (59.2)	18.8 (65.8)	20.5 (68.9)	19.9 (67.8)	14.8 (58.6)	9.1 (48.4)	3.4 (38.1)	−1.5 (29.3)	9.1 (48.4)
Mean daily minimum °C (°F)	−5.4 (22.3)	−4.2 (24.4)	−0.4 (31.3)	4.9 (40.8)	9.9 (49.8)	13.9 (57.0)	15.6 (60.1)	14.9 (58.8)	10.2 (50.4)	5.2 (41.4)	0.7 (33.3)	−4.0 (24.8)	5.1 (41.2)
Record low °C (°F)	−30.7 (−23.3)	−29.0 (−20.2)	−21.7 (−7.1)	−13.6 (7.5)	−2.0 (28.4)	3.0 (37.4)	7.4 (45.3)	3.4 (38.1)	−4.4 (24.1)	−9.7 (14.5)	−17.5 (0.5)	−28.0 (−18.4)	−30.7 (−23.3)
Average precipitation mm (inches)	26 (1.0)	30 (1.2)	37 (1.5)	44 (1.7)	75 (3.0)	93 (3.7)	93 (3.7)	66 (2.6)	56 (2.2)	44 (1.7)	32 (1.3)	33 (1.3)	629 (24.9)
Average extreme snow depth cm (inches)	8 (3.1)	10 (3.9)	6 (2.4)	0 (0)	0 (0)	0 (0)	0 (0)	0 (0)	0 (0)	0 (0)	1 (0.4)	4 (1.6)	10 (3.9)
Average rainy days	7	7	12	17	17	18	15	13	13	13	12	9	153
Average snowy days	15	15	10	3	0.03	0	0	0	0	1	7	13	64
Average relative humidity (%)	84.1	80.9	73.9	67.1	68.7	70.9	70.5	70.8	74.4	79.4	85.3	86.0	76.0
Mean monthly sunshine hours	61	81	137	194	245	258	277	260	190	130	64	50	1,947
Source 1: Pogoda.ru.net
Source 2: NOAA (humidity and sun 1991–2020)

=== Landscape ===
The total area of Chernivtsi within the administrative boundaries of 2013 is about 153 km^{2} (59 sq mi). According to the functional purpose the lands of the city are divided as follows: land of residential and public buildings (64%), lands of agricultural purpose (17%), lands of industry (9%), lands of recreational and environmental purpose (5%), lands of general use (3%), commercial land (2%).

The main water source of Chernivtsi is the Prut River in its upper reaches, which divides the city in half. Besides, there are six small streams and nine lakes within the city.

The relief is characterized by significant relief dip – from 150 metres (490 ft) above sea level in the Prut valleys to 537 metres (1,762 ft) in the western outskirts (Mount Tsetzino), which is caused by the location on the Chernivtsi Upland.

Chernivtsi is considered to be a "green city": the large territory is occupied by parks, squares, gardens, alleys and flower gardens. Nine objects are recognized as monuments of landscape art. The city has a botanical garden at the Yuriy Fedkovych National University with a unique orangery. Among the relict plants growing in the botanical garden, a special place is occupied by a giant Sequoiadendron.

Chernivtsi is located in the center of Chernivtsi Regional Park, which borders zakaznik "Thetzino" in the west and Mount Berda in the north.

=== State of the environment ===
At the end of the twentieth century, the main pollutants of the Chernivtsi environment were industrial enterprises, including the MIC. In the 1990s much of them ceased to exist or significantly reduced production capacity and thus reduced industrial emissions. Despite this, 58 enterprises (38.4% of the total amount in the region) are the main pollutants of the environment. Approximately 1.2 tonnes of pollutants are released into the air annually (34.9% of the total area emissions). Non-methane volatile organic compounds, carbon dioxide and substances in the form of solid suspended solids predominate in the structure of the emitted pollutants. In addition, carbon dioxide, which has a greenhouse effect, is periodically released into the atmosphere of the city. Emissions from stationary sources were 7.9 tonnes per 1 km^{2} (0.39 sq mi) of Chernivtsi territory. Each inhabitant of the regional center accounts for an average of 4.8 kg (11 lb) of harmful emissions per year.

In 2008, Chernivtsi established an Environmental Monitoring System (EMS), an information structure that integrates environmental monitoring organizations and industrial enterprises that pollute the environment or which may adversely affect the environment or its components.

Since the late 1990s, transport is a significant factor in the negative impact on the environment. To some extent, the situation was improved with the construction of the first (2004) and the second (2010) queues of the bypass road, which connected the directions "Kyiv-Chernivtsi" and "Chernivtsi-Suceava". The problem of transit transport in the city will be finally resolved after the construction of the third branch of the bypass road, which will connect the directions "Suceava-Chernivtsi" and "Chernivtsi-Lviv".

== Government ==
Chernivtsi is the administrative center of the Chernivtsi Oblast (province) and the city itself has own government within the oblast under subordination to Chernivtsi Raion.

=== Municipal Divisions and Historical Neighborhoods ===
The modern urban footprint of Chernivtsi is the result of successive expansions that absorbed several historically independent towns and suburban villages, which previously formed the basis of the city's three administrative districts:

- Sadhora (Ukrainian: Садгора, Romanian: Sadagura, German: Sadagora, Polish: Sadagóra, Yiddish: סאדיגורא, romanized: Sadigora or Sadigur): Originally established as an independent market town in 1770, it became an internationally renowned center of Hasidic Judaism and the historical seat of the Sadigura rabbinic dynasty. It was formally integrated into Chernivtsi's municipal boundaries in 1965, serving as the namesake and administrative hub for the city's northern Sadhirskyi District.
- Lenkivtsi (Ukrainian: Ленківці, Romanian: Lencăuți, German: Lenkoutz or Kameral-Lenkoutz, Polish: Lenkowce): Recorded historically during the Austrian Empire era as Kameral-Lenkoutz (or Cameral-Lenkoutz), this suburb on the north bank of the Prut River was first administratively transferred to the city limits in August 1949 from Sadhora Raion. Following a brief period back under raion jurisdiction, it was permanently consolidated into the city boundaries in 1965.
- Rosha (Ukrainian: Роша, Romanian: Roșa or Roșoșa, German: Rosch or Rosz): A historic western village split into upper and lower sections, it historically served as the primary agricultural hub for the initial waves of German colonists settling in Bukovina under early Austrian governance. It was gradually absorbed into the city during municipal expansions at the close of the 19th century.
- Klokuchka (Ukrainian: Клокучка, Romanian: Clocucica or Clocușca, German: Klokutschka, Polish: Klokuczka): Originally a minor 18th-century settlement focused around a natural spring, it transformed into a densely populated railway worker suburb following the expansion of the regional rail infrastructure in 1866. The area was subsequently annexed directly into the urban proper during the late Austrian imperial era.
- Kalichanka (Ukrainian: Калічанка, Romanian: Caliceanca, German: Kaliczanka, Polish: Kaliczanka): An eastern agrarian suburb that expanded significantly along the transport corridors heading toward the Prut valley. Formally incorporated into the Chernivtsi municipal structure during post-war administrative overhauls in the late 1940s, it is notable as the site of the historic Jewish cemetery of Chernivtsi.
- Zhuchka (Ukrainian: Стара Жучка, Romanian: Jucica Veche or Moșii Vechi, German: Alt-Zutschka, Polish: Stara Żuczka): Positioned alongside Nova Zhuchka near Sadhora, this ancient village dates back to a 1537 land charter by Moldavian Prince Petru Rareș. It was a site of major agricultural and early brewing enterprises before its eventual integration into Chernivtsi's municipal boundaries alongside Sadhora in 1965.

Until 1 January 2016, the territory of Chernivtsi was divided into three administrative urban districts:

No.	Name	in Ukrainian	Population
1	Pershotravnevyi District	Першотравневий район	69,370
2	Sadhirskyi District	Садгірський район	28,227
3	Shevchenkivskyi District	Шевченківський район	139,094

The current mayor of Chernivtsi is Roman Klichuk, who has been elected in 2020 Ukrainian local elections.

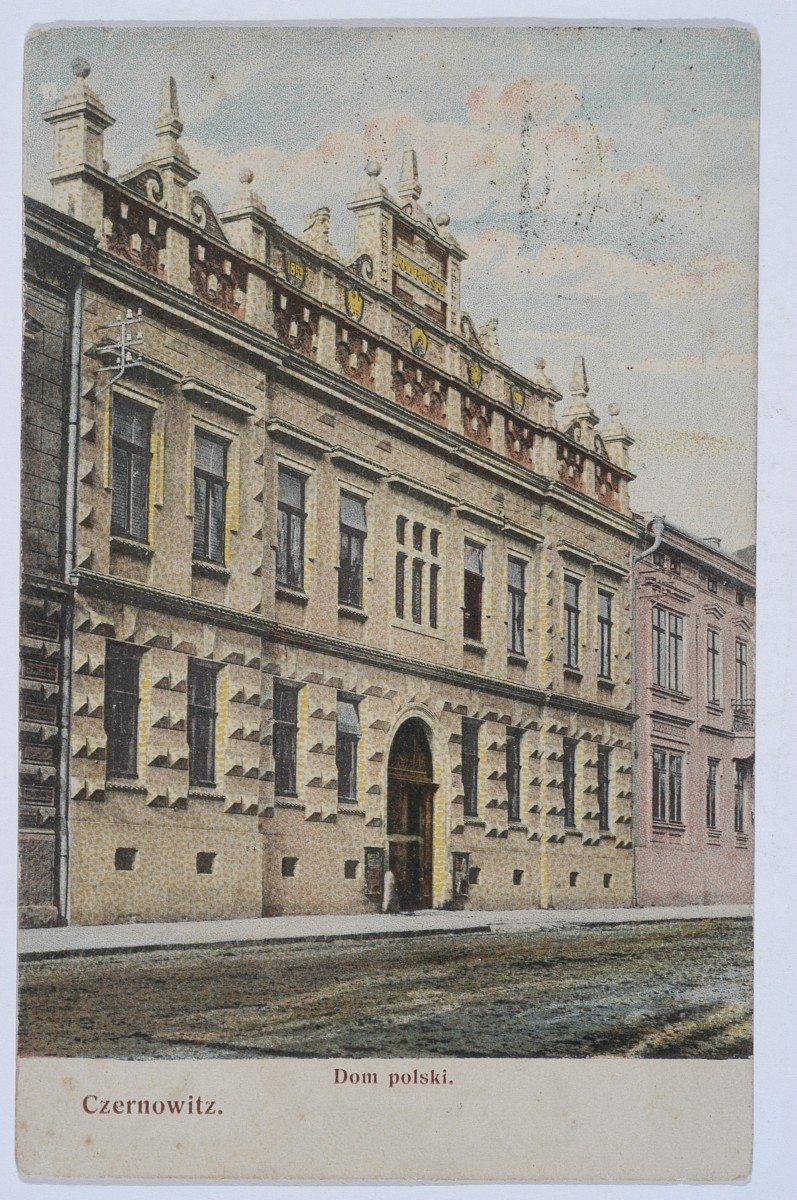
Polish House, 1910

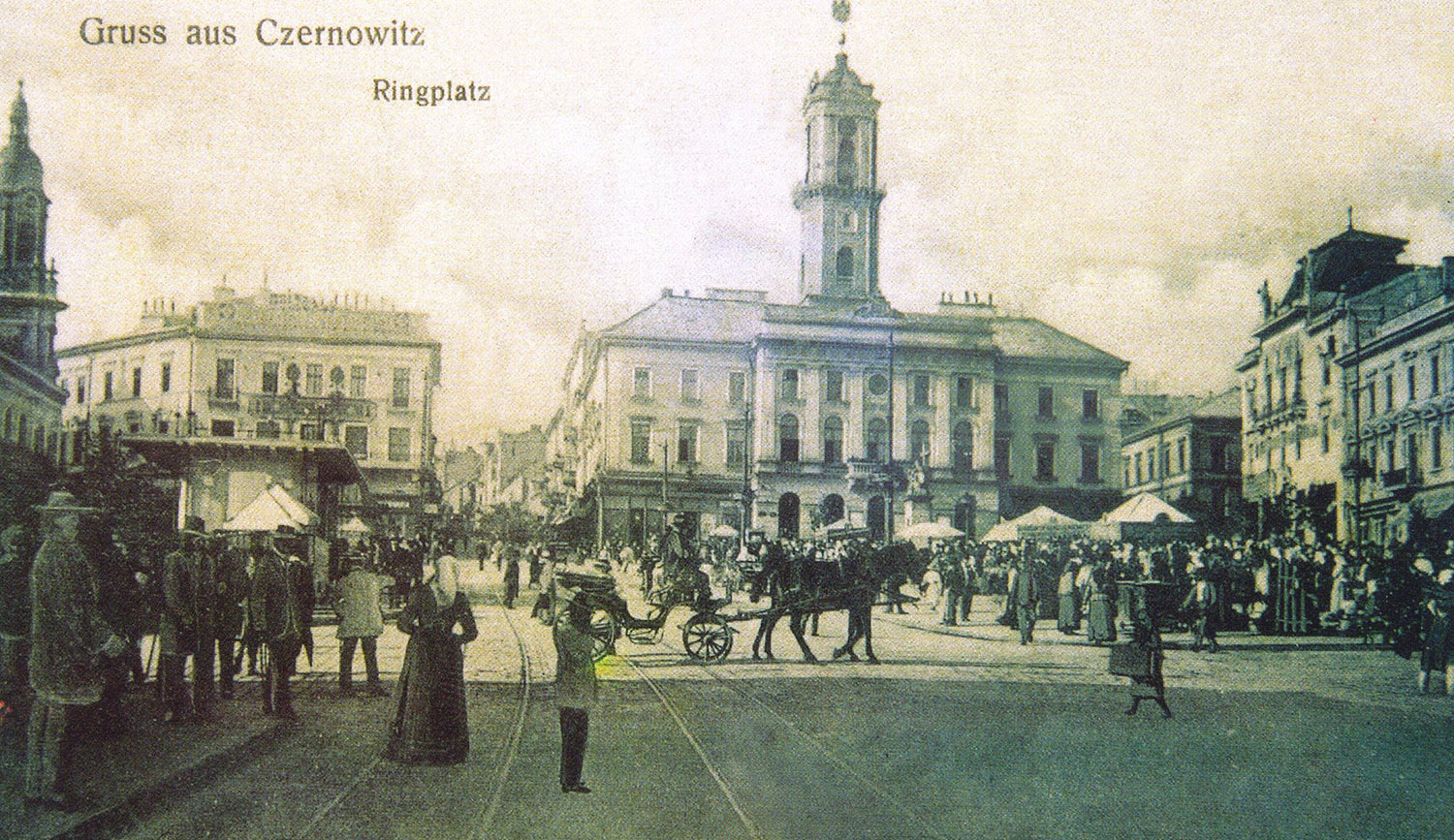
Central Square of Czernowitz in the early 1900s

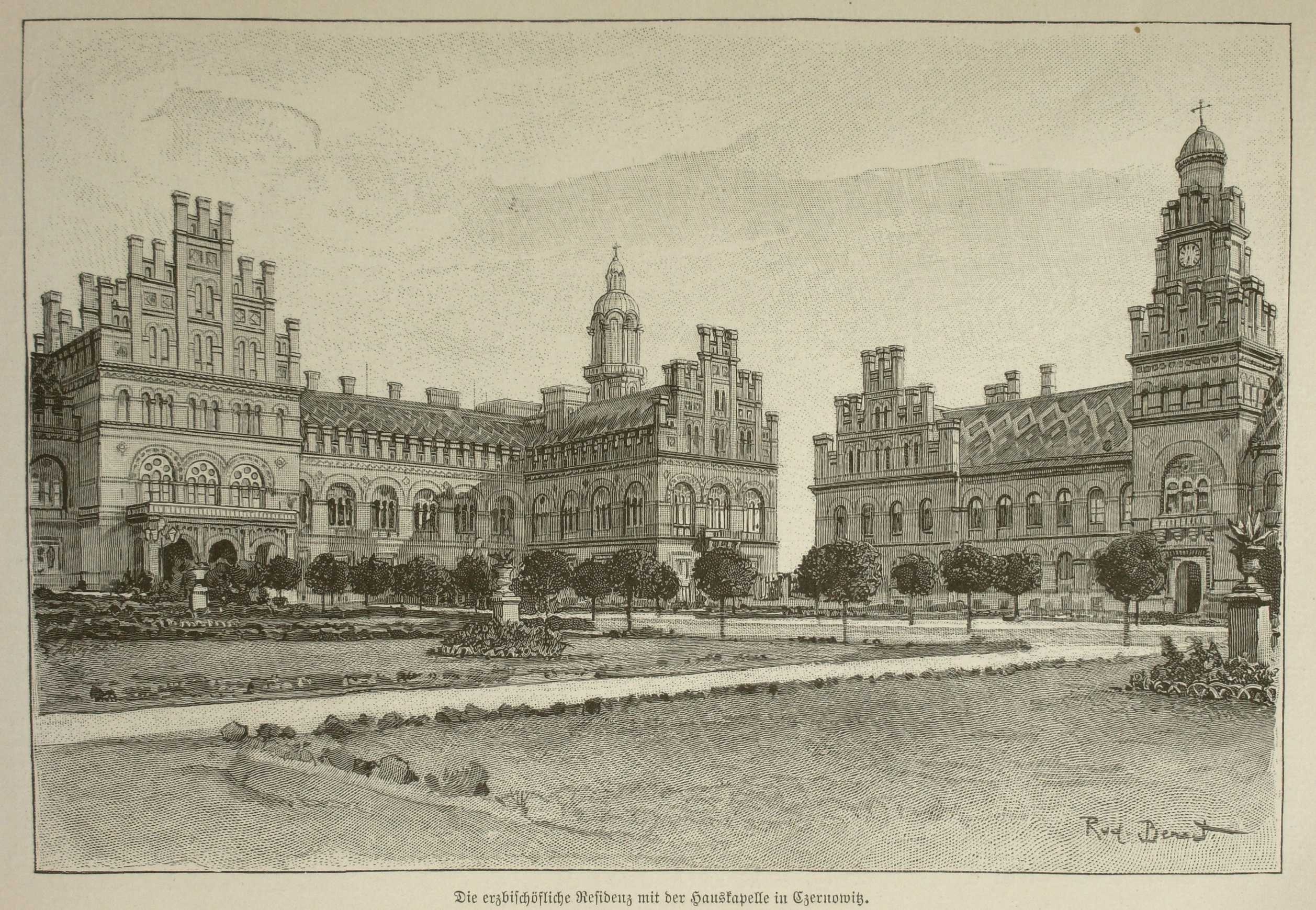
The Residence (photograph of c. 1899)

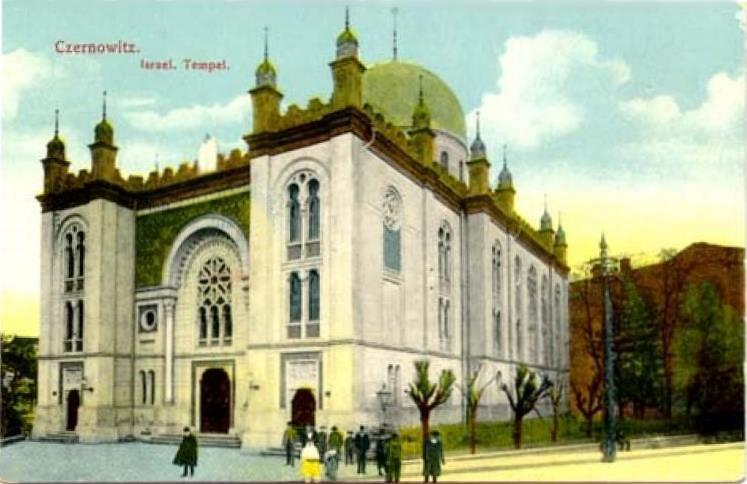
An early 20th-century postcard depicting the Czernowitz Synagogue

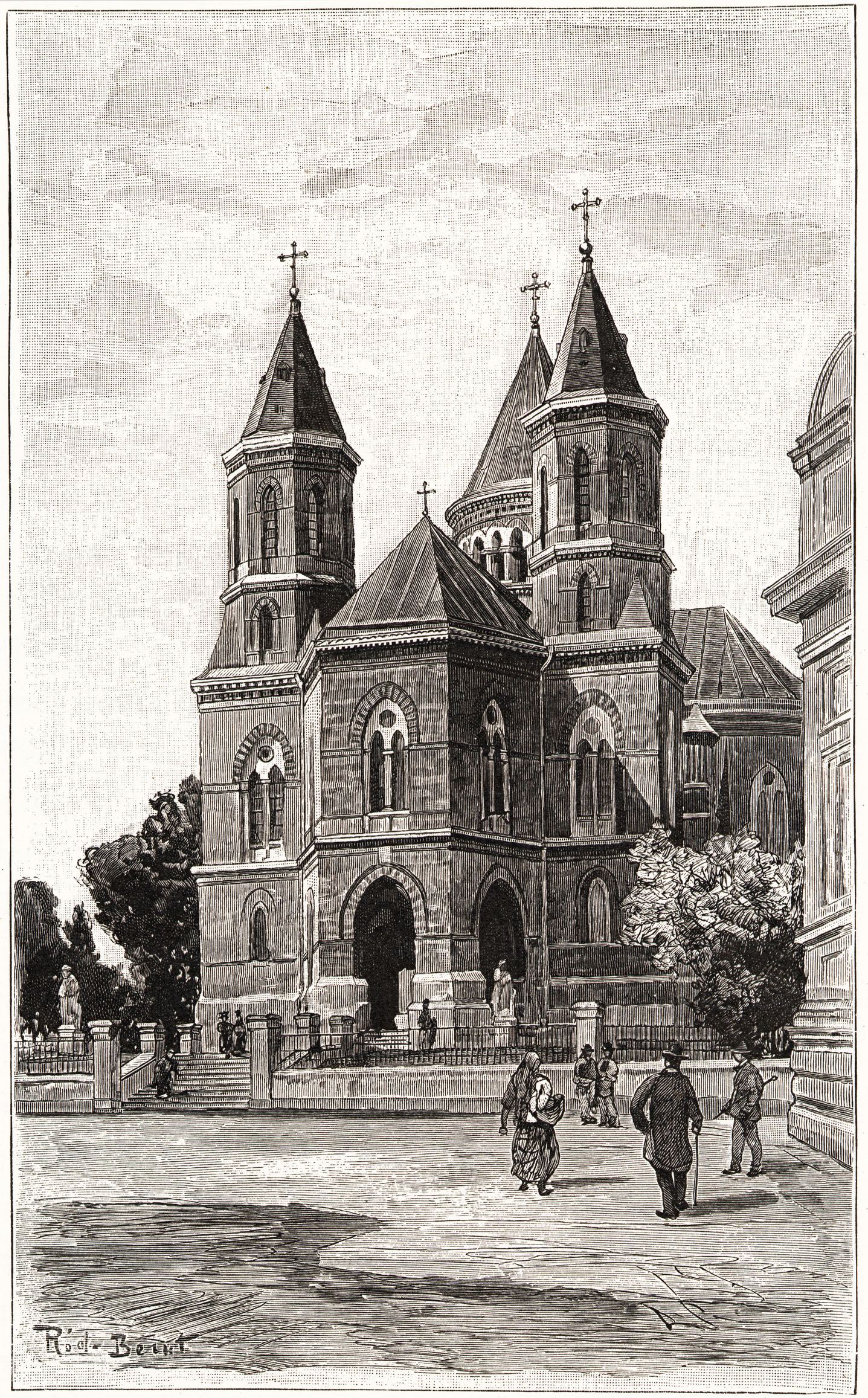
Armenian church in the early 1900s

Statue of Franz Joseph I

== Demographics ==
Historical population
Year	Pop.	±%
1939	106,300	—
1959	141,940	+33.5%
1970	186,812	+31.6%
1979	218,561	+17.0%
1989	256,644	+17.4%
2001	240,621	−6.2%
2011	253,843	+5.5%
2022	264,298	+4.1%

The population, according to the data of the 2001 population census in Ukraine, was 236,691 inhabitants. Among them, there 189,021 identified themselves as ethnic Ukrainians (79.86%), 26,733 as Russians (11.29%), 10,553 as Romanians (4.36%), 3,829 as Moldovans (1.62%), 1,408 as Poles; (0.59%), 1,308 as Jews (0.55%) and 971 as members of other groups (0.41%). The city of Chernivtsi had 236,691 inhabitants in 2001, of which 187,465 stated that they spoke Ukrainian (79.20%), 10,353 Romanian (4.37%, out of which 7,706 Romanian called it Romanian, or 3.26%, and 2,557 called it Moldovan, or 1.36%), 284 Polish (0.11%), and 36,150 Russian (15.27%).

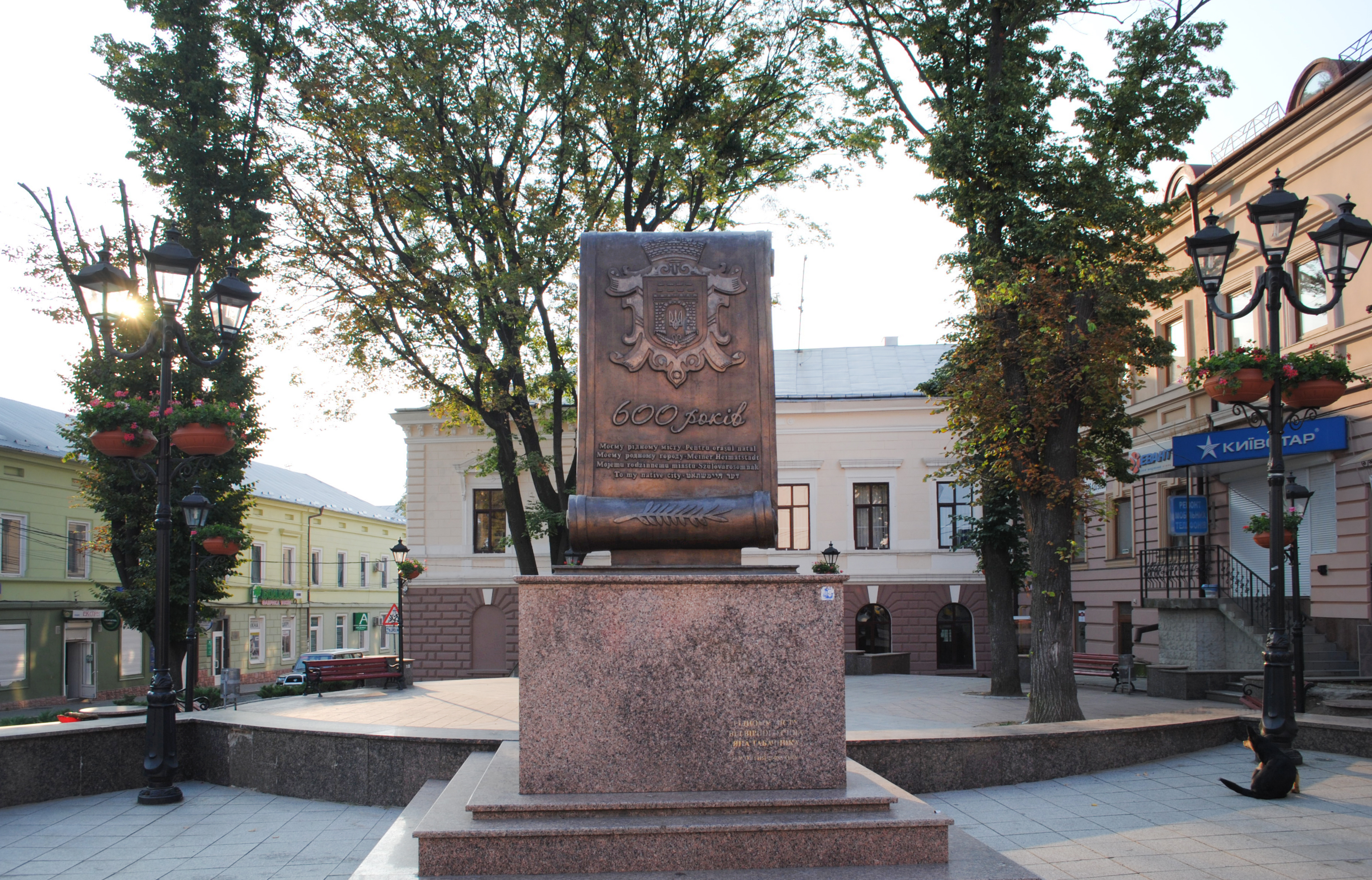
Multilingual monument in Chernivtsi

Based on the last available Soviet data, the population of the city, as of 1 January 1989, was 258,375 residents. Among these, there are some 171,925 Ukrainians (66.5%), 45,865 Russians (17.8%), 15,671 Jews (6.1%), 13,017 Romanians (5%), 6,361 Moldovans (2.5%), 2,205 Poles (0.9%), and 1,725 Belarusians (0.7%). At that time, 62.57% of the population was Ukrainian-speaking, 30.18% Russian-speaking, and 5.18% Romanian-speaking (of which 3.02% said that they were Romanian speaking, and 2.16% Moldovan-speaking).

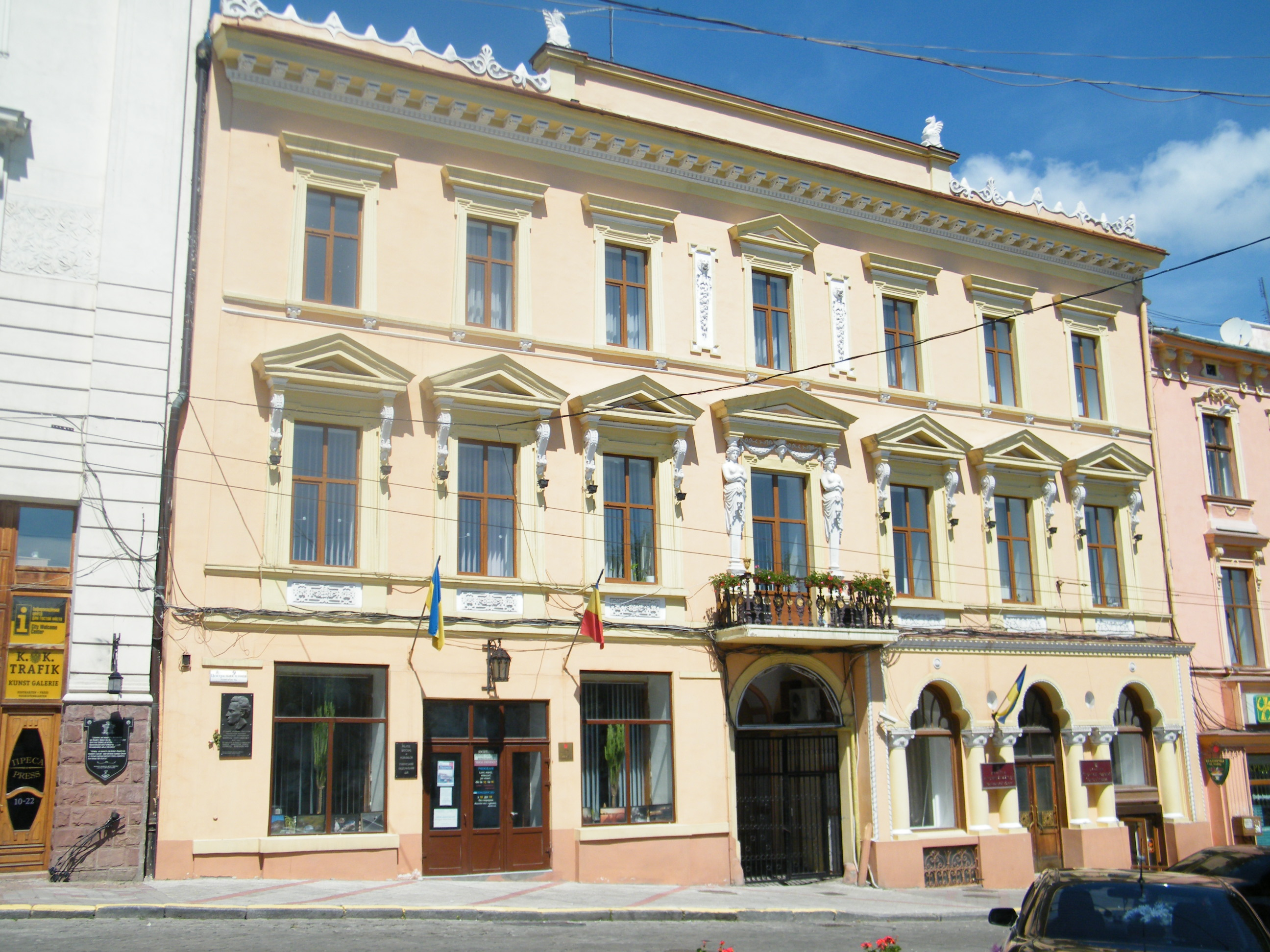
The National Palace of the Romanians of Chernivtsi

The Romanian population in Chernivtsi started decreasing rapidly after 1950. Many Romanians fled to Romania or were deported to Siberia (where most deportees according to some sources), and the remaining Romanian population quickly became a minority and assimilated with the majority. According to minority organizations, the Romanian minority in Chernivtsi is still decreasing nowadays as a result of cultural assimilation and emigration to Romania.

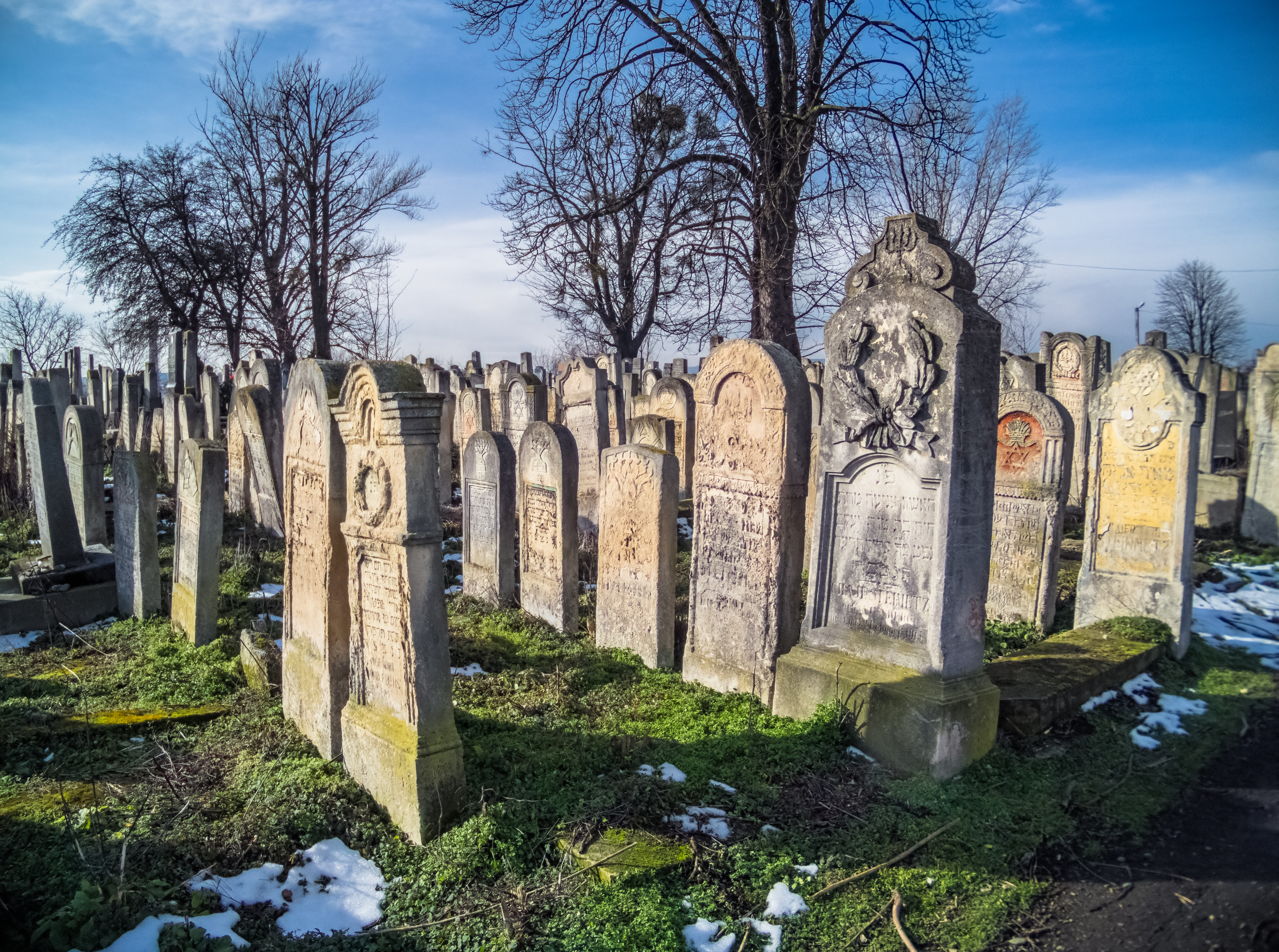
Jewish cemetery of Chernivtsi

Chernivtsi once had a Jewish community of over 50,000, many of whom did not survive World War II. About 60% of the Jewish deportees to Transnistria from the city of Chernivtsi died there according to the Jewish Virtual Library. According to Gali Mir-Tibon, most of the Jews deported from the city of Chernivtsi, as well as northern Bukovina in general, to Transnistria did not survive. Romanian lawyer and reserve officer Theodor Criveanu, as well as the then city mayor Traian Popovici, supported by General Vasile Ionescu saved 19,689 Jewish people. Initially, Governor of Bukovina Corneliu Calotescu allowed only 190 Jewish people to stay, but Traian Popovici, after an incredible effort, obtained from the then dictator of Romania Marshal Ion Antonescu an allowance of 20,000. After World War II, the city was a key node in the Berihah network, which helped Jews to emigrate to the then Mandate Palestine from the difficult conditions after the War. Following the collapse of the Soviet Union in 1991, the majority of the remaining Jewish population emigrated to Israel and the United States. A famous member of this latter emigration is the actress Mila Kunis.

Chernivtsi was inhabited by Ukrainians, Romanians, Poles, Ruthenians, Jews, Roma, and Germans. During its affiliation with the Austro-Hungarian monarchy, Chernivtsi enjoyed prosperity and culture as the capital of the Bukovina crown land. Until 1918, the main language of the city was German, which, in addition to the Germans, was also spoken by Jews (together they made up half the population of the city) and even partly by Ukrainians, Romanians and Poles. After World War II, the Shoah and Porajmos, and the resettlement and expulsion of the whole ethnic groups, including Germans and Romanians, this status was diminished. Today, the Ukrainians are the dominant population group.

Chernivtsi's change in demographic diversity is demonstrated by the following population statistics. Once, Romanians and Ukrainians formed the majority of the population. However, after 1870, Yiddish-speaking or German-speaking Jews surpassed the Romanians as the largest population group of the town.

Jews in Chernivtsi according to Austrian-Hungarian Census
Year	Approximate Total Population	Jewish Population	Percentage
1857	22,000	4,678	21.6%
1869	34,000	9,552	28.2%
1880	46,000	14,449	31.7%
1890	54,000	17,359	32.0%
1900	68,000	21,587	31.9%
1910	87,000	28,613	32.8%

	Chernivtsi (City)		Chernivtsi (Suburbs)	
Year	Romanians	Ukrainians	Romanians	Ukrainians
1860	9,177	4,133	20,068	6,645
1870	5,999	5,831	28,315	35,011
1880	6,431	8,232	8,887	23,051
1890	7,624	10,385	11,433	34,067
1900	9,400	13,030	13,252	25,476
1910	13,440	15,254	18,060	22,351

=== Language ===
Distribution of the population by native language according to the 2001 census:

Language	Number	Percentage
Ukrainian	187 465	79.20%
Russian	36 150	15.27%
Romanian	7 706	3.26%
Moldovan	2 557	1.08%
Other or undecided	2 813	1.19%
Total	236 691	100.00%

Native language of the population of the former districts of the city according to the 2001 census.

	Ukrainian	Russian	Romanian	Moldovan	Polish	Belarusian
Chernivtsi	79,20	15,27	3,26	1,08	0,12	0,09
Sadhirskyi District	93,43	4,04	0,38	0,51	0,13	0,08
Pershotravnevyi District	77,45	16,22	3,53	1,43	0,12	0,09
Shevchenkivskyi District	77,19	17,08	3,70	1,02	0,12	0,09

According to a survey conducted by the International Republican Institute in April–May 2023, 82% of the city's population spoke Ukrainian at home, 15% spoke Russian, and 2% spoke Romanian. This reflects the increasing proportion of Ukrainian-speakers in the city, from 79.2% in 2001 to 82% in 2023, while the proportion of Russian-speakers stayed stationary at 15%, and the percentage of Romanian-speakers decreased from 4.34% in 2001 to around 2% in 2023. Most of the self-identified ethnic Romanians (4.36% of the population in 2001) and Moldovans (1.36% of the population in 2001) seemed to be Ukrainian-speakers by 2023.

== Economy ==
The total number of economic entities in the city is 25.4 thousand. On 1 January 2006, there were 6739 legal entities – business entities and almost 19,000 private entrepreneurs – individuals, primarily represented by small enterprises. The volume of sales and services provided to small enterprises is ₴578 million or 22% of the total Chernivtsi volumes. The share of the city's tax revenues is almost 35%. The most attractive for small businesses are trade and services, restaurant and tourist business.

Wholesale and retail trade, industry and construction are successfully developing in Chernivtsi. In 2005, wholesale and retail sales accounted for over 64%, industry – 23%, construction – 6%, real estate operations – 2.3%, transport and communications – more than 2%.

=== Industry ===
In the industrial sector of the city, there are 10 branches, which have 70 large enterprises with a total number of employees over 20 thousand people or 13% of the working population of the city. The annual volume of industrial production at these enterprises is about ₴775 million. The share of citywide tax revenues to the budgets of all levels of the industry is 21%. Defining industries in the city's industry are food, light, mechanical engineering and woodworking. Food processing companies produce sugar, bakery products, alcohol, oil, meat and milk, fruits, vegetables and other products. In the light industry, the production of garments, knitwear, hosiery, rubber and leather footwear and textiles prevails. Mechanical engineering is represented by the production of oil and gas processing equipment and agricultural machinery. The timber industry is dominated by the production of lumber, furniture, joinery and other wood products.

=== Trade and services ===
In 2005, there were 1922 trade enterprises, 609 restaurants, 892 services in the city. There are 22 markets and micro-markets in the city. ₴10 million are invested annually in their construction, reconstruction, improvement of trade conditions and creation of facilities for buyers. Chernivtsi City Shopping Complex, "Kalinivskiy Rynok" Municipal Enterprise is a modern multidisciplinary enterprise with powerful infrastructure. The average daily number of market visitors is 50,000 people, served by 9,100 entrepreneurs. The volume of services in 2005 amounted to almost ₴23 million, more than ₴18 million was paid into the city budget, or nearly 10% of the total revenues.

== Health care ==
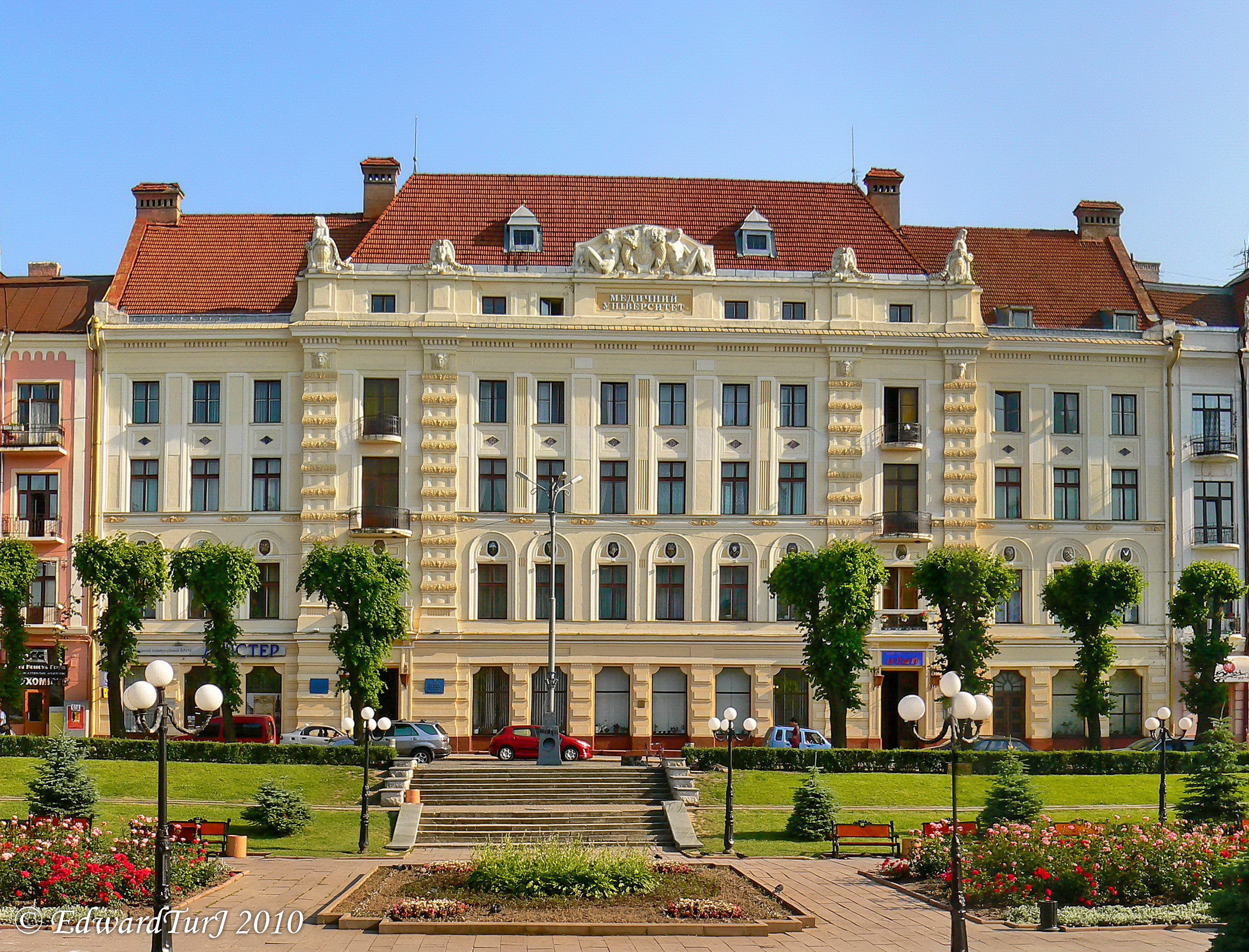
Bukovinian State Medical University

Almost all health care establishments of the region are concentrated in Chernivtsi. 39 medical establishments (hospitals, clinics, and polyclinics) provide citizens of Chernivtsi with necessary medical care. Medical services are provided by 4.47 thousand people, of which – 1102 doctors, 1902 – average health workers, 1473 – junior and support staff.

Municipal medical establishments provide the following medical services:

- Emergency care (emergency care station);
- Dispensary and polyclinic care (5 municipal polyclinics, a municipal children polyclinic, polyclinics of two maternity houses, a polyclinic of preventive examination and Municipal Dentistry Association, which includes two dentist clinics);
- Specialized medical care (3 hospitals, 2 maternity houses, a tuberculosis hospital and a municipal children hospital);
- Disease-prevention and anti-epidemic services (a municipal sanitary and epidemiological station).

== Culture ==
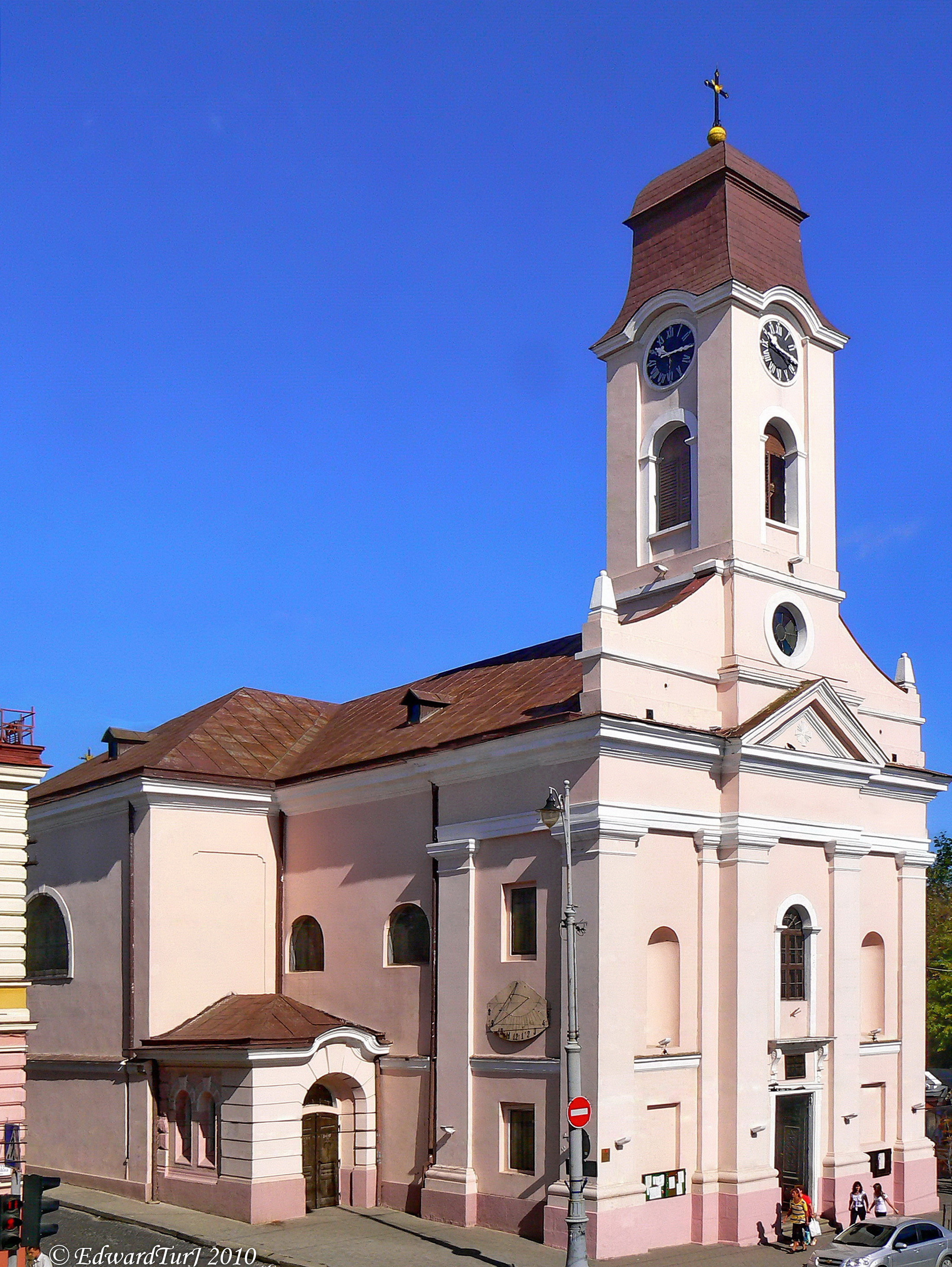
Basilica of the Exaltation of the Cross

Throughout the centuries Chernivtsi, as the center of Bukovina, was forming as a multicultural city with an atmosphere of tolerance, which contributed to the development of artists and artistic institutions across the ethnic boundaries.

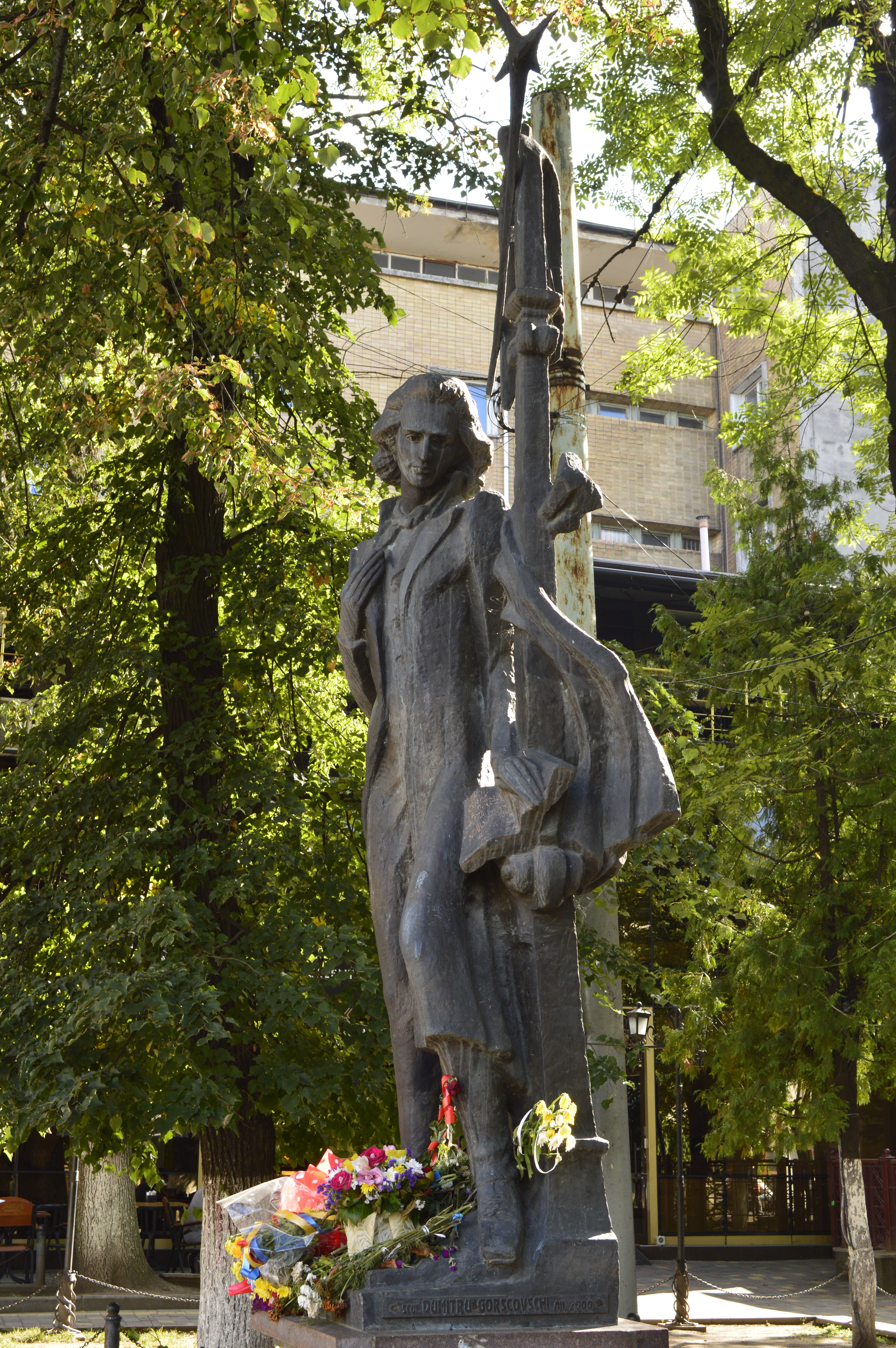
Statue of Mihai Eminescu

The city has 2 theaters, a philharmonic hall, an organ hall (located in the building of an Armenian Catholic Church), more than 10 museums, 6 cinemas, 31 libraries, a palace of culture, 4 music schools and a fine arts school. The city has more than 100 religious organizations and diocesan authorities. More than a dozen of active non-profit cultural organizations operate in Chernivtsi, including Adam Mickiewicz Polish Culture Society, Mihai Eminescu Romanian Culture Society and the Society of Austrian and German Culture.

The National Palace of the Romanians of Chernivtsi is a building of great relevance for the ethnic Romanians of the city and the surrounding area. Chernivtsi also features a Romanian military cemetery. Serving Romanian units quartered in the city during the interwar period, it was reestablished in 2008; several funerary monuments on graves belonging to Romanian officers were destroyed during Soviet rule. The cemetery contains the remains of Romanian soldiers buried during the interwar period or who died fighting during World War II, as well as ethnic Romanian and Ukrainian political prisoners victims of Soviet repression during 1940 and 1941 who were buried in mass graves at the cemetery.

Since 1997, Chernivtsi has hosted an international art event under "Days of European Culture Heritage" project. Every year "Bukovinian Meetings" folklore festival is held during the City Day in which art groups from Poland, Hungary, Romania and Germany take part.

Important part of Chernivtsi cultural life is Malanka Fest, Ukraine's main carnival timed to the religious St. Melania ("Malanka") Day and St. Basil Day. The festival is usually held on 14 January, although the date may be moved to match the weekend. During the Festival groups from different towns and settlements of Bukovina compete in the artistic ingenuity.

One of the biggest literary festival in Ukraine is the Meridian Czernowitz International Poetic Festival. The purpose of the festival is to return Chernivtsi to the cultural map of Europe and to develop a dialogue between contemporary Ukrainian poets and their foreign colleagues. The festival saw the participants from more than 13 different countries.

Several of the publications of Ukraine's Romanian minority are published in Chernivtsi, including Zorile Bucovinei, Concordia, Libertatea Cuvântului, Curierul de Cernăuți, Arcașul and Septentrion literar. Cernăuți TV, a private Romanian-language TV channel is also headquartered in Chernivtsi.

=== Museums ===
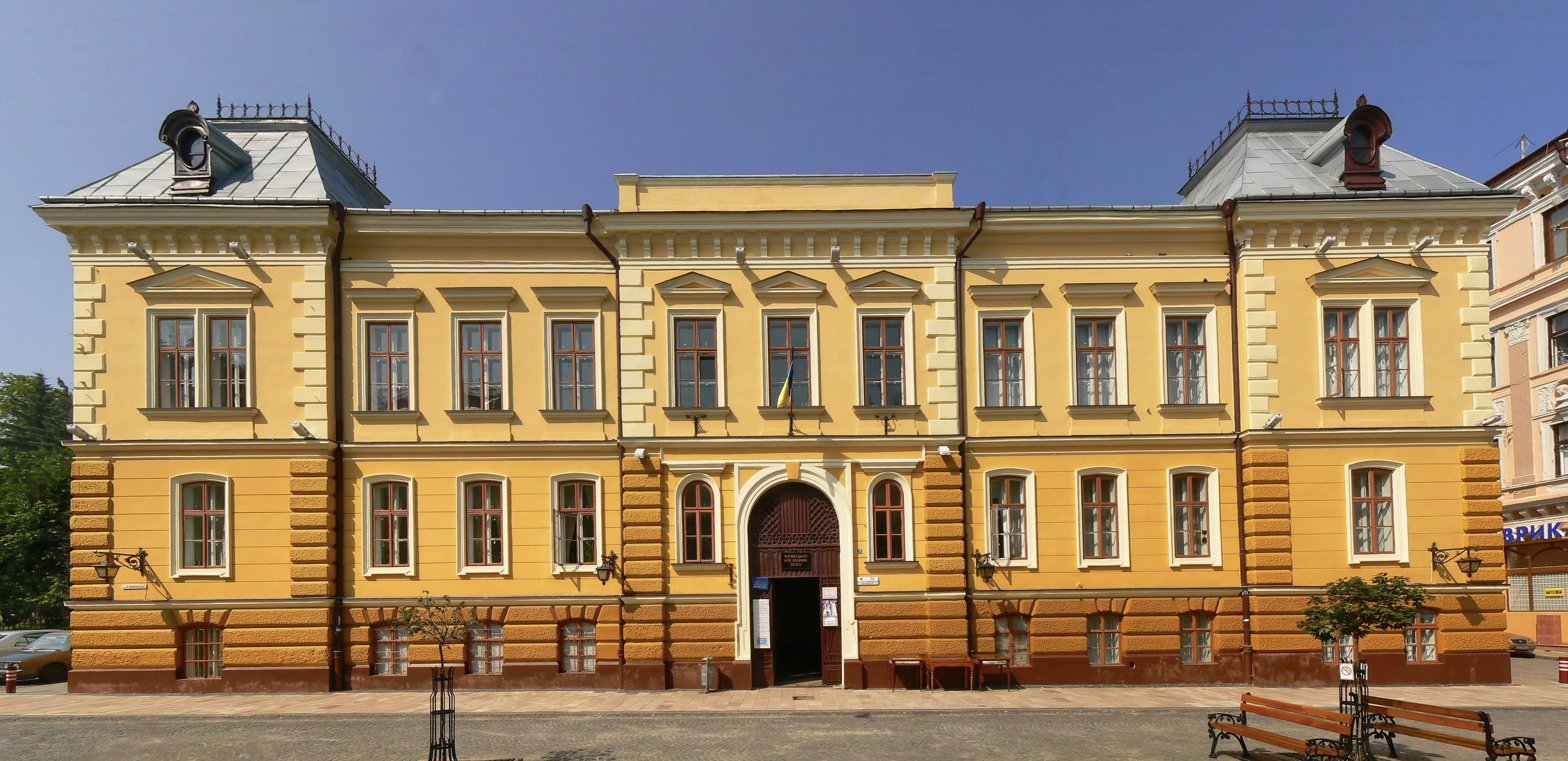
Chernivtsi Museum of Local Lore

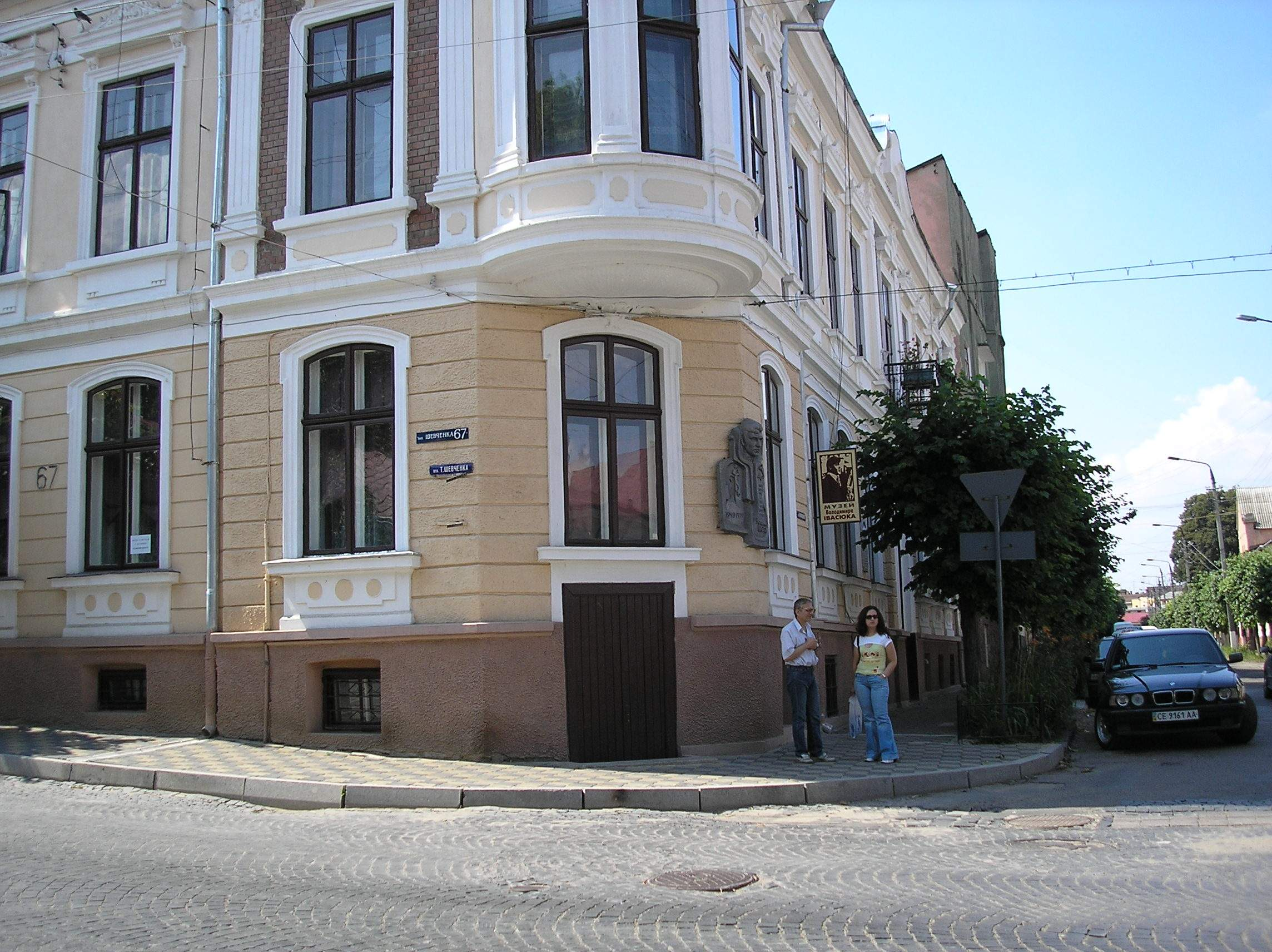
Volodymyr Ivasyuk Memorial Museum

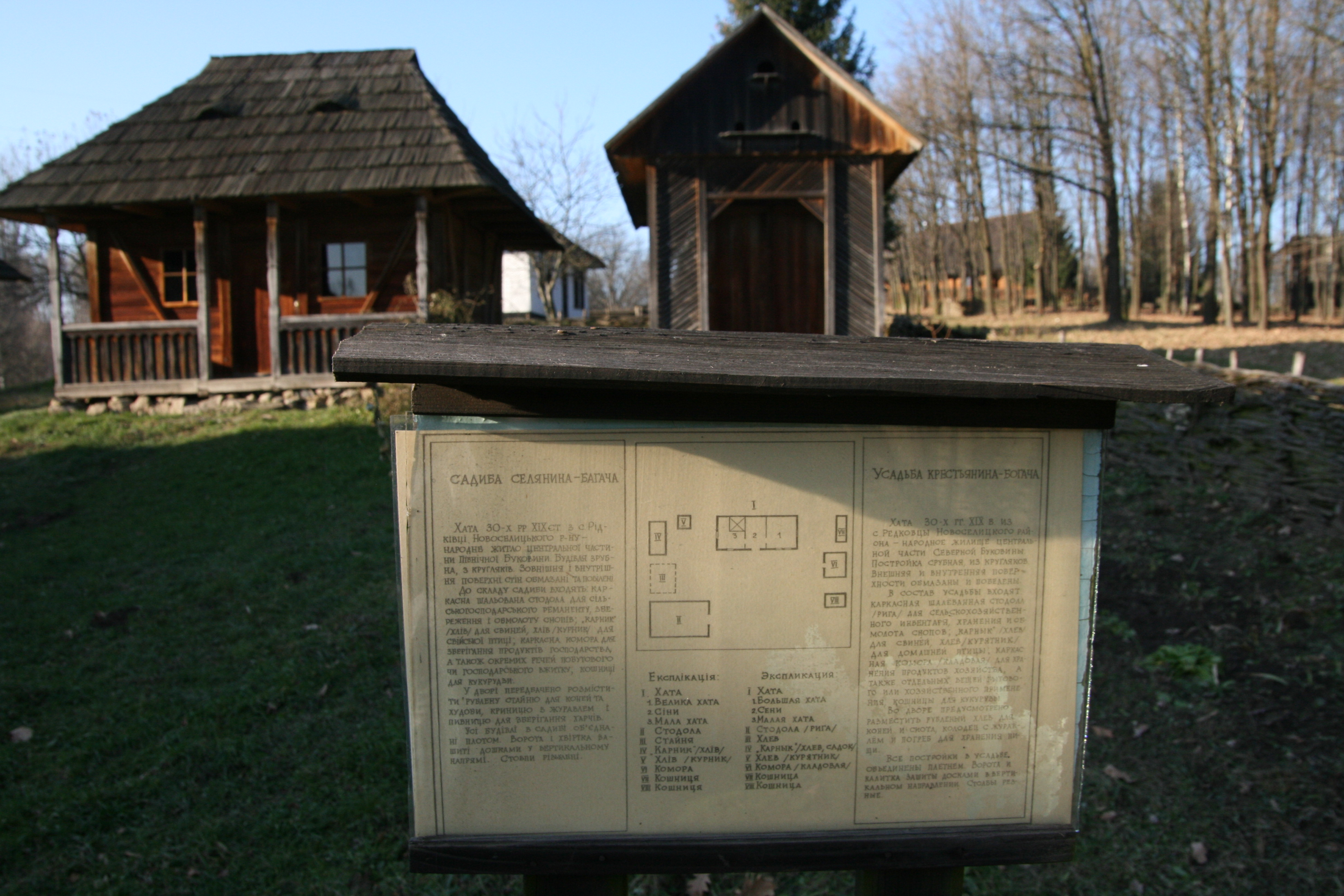
Museum of the Diaspora of Bukovina

- Chernivtsi Museum of Local Lore has the largest collection of materials and artifacts of the nature, history, and culture of Northern Bukovina: a collection of old printed books with a unique Ostroh Bible, printed by Ivan Fedorov in 1581; numismatic collection with more than 3 thousand coins; a collection of weapons; an archaeological collection of more than 12,000 objects. The museum hosts a collection of works of fine and decorative arts, the basis of which consists of icons of the 16th to 18th centuries and works of prominent Bukovinian artists. The natural collection includes nearly 10,000 specimens, including taxidermy, herbarium and entomological collections.
- Chernivtsi Regional Art Museum. The museum is located in an Art Nouveau monument of architecture of national significance. The total number of exhibits in the museum exceeds 10,000, including a collection of unique Bukovinian folk and religious images, rugs and glass icons of the 19th and 20th centuries, Bukovina and Hutsul pysankas, old printed books, isuch as the 1632 printing of "The Apostle" and a number of academic and modernist paintings.
- History and Culture Museum of Bukovinian Jews, located in the former Jewish People's House (now the Central Palace of Culture). The museum hosts a collection of exhibits on the religious and secular lives of Bukovina Jewish community from 18th to the middle of the 20th century, including books, documents, photographs, costumes and decorative arts.
- Chernivtsi Museum of Folk Architecture and Folkways, an architectural and landscape complex consisting of monuments of folk architecture of the late 18th to the first half of the 20th centuries. The exposition of the museum includes about 35 structures, transported from different parts of the region and rebuilt in their original forms with appropriate natural surroundings.
- Olha Kobylianska Literary Memorial Museum
- Yuriy Fedkovych Literary Memorial Museum
- Volodymyr Ivasiuk Memorial Museum
- Museum of the Bukovinian Diaspora
- Air and Space Museum

== Architecture ==
There are many places which attract residents and visitors of Chernivtsi: Drama Theatre, Regional Philharmonic Society, Organ and Chamber Music Hall, puppet theatre, Museum of Local Lore, History and Economy, Museum of Fine Arts, Bukovinian Diaspora Museum, Museum of Folk Architecture and Way of Life, memorial museums of writers, the Central Palace of Culture, the Star Alley in Teatralna Square.

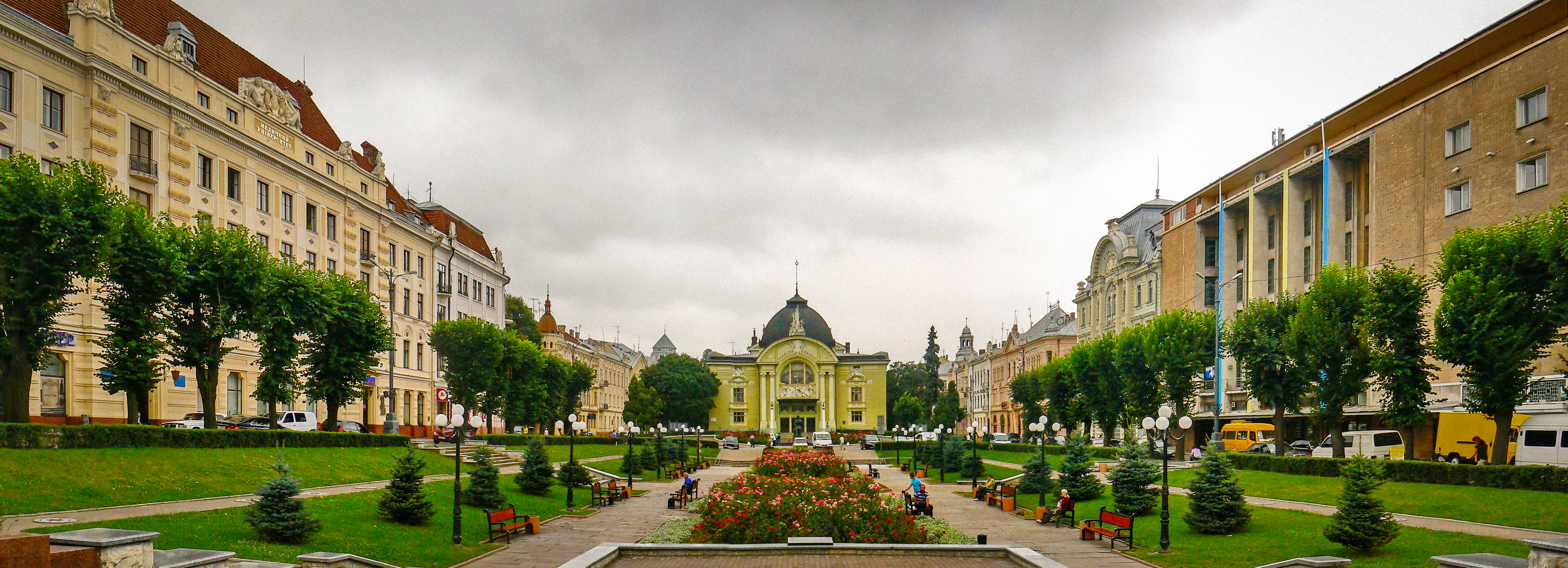
Teatralna Square

The city of Chernivtsi has a lot of architecturally important buildings. Many historic buildings have been preserved, especially within the city's center.

As Chernivtsi was part of the Austro-Hungarian Empire, it was closely related to the empire's culture, including architecture. Main architectural styles present within the city include Vienna Secession and Neoclassicism, Baroque, late Gothic architecture, and fragments of traditional Ukrainian and Moldavian architecture, Byzantine architecture as well as Cubism. During the Interwar Romanian administration, a great number of buildings in the Neo-Romanian and Art Deco architectural styles were also built. The city is sometimes dubbed Little Vienna, because its architecture is reminiscent of the Austro-Hungarian capital Vienna.

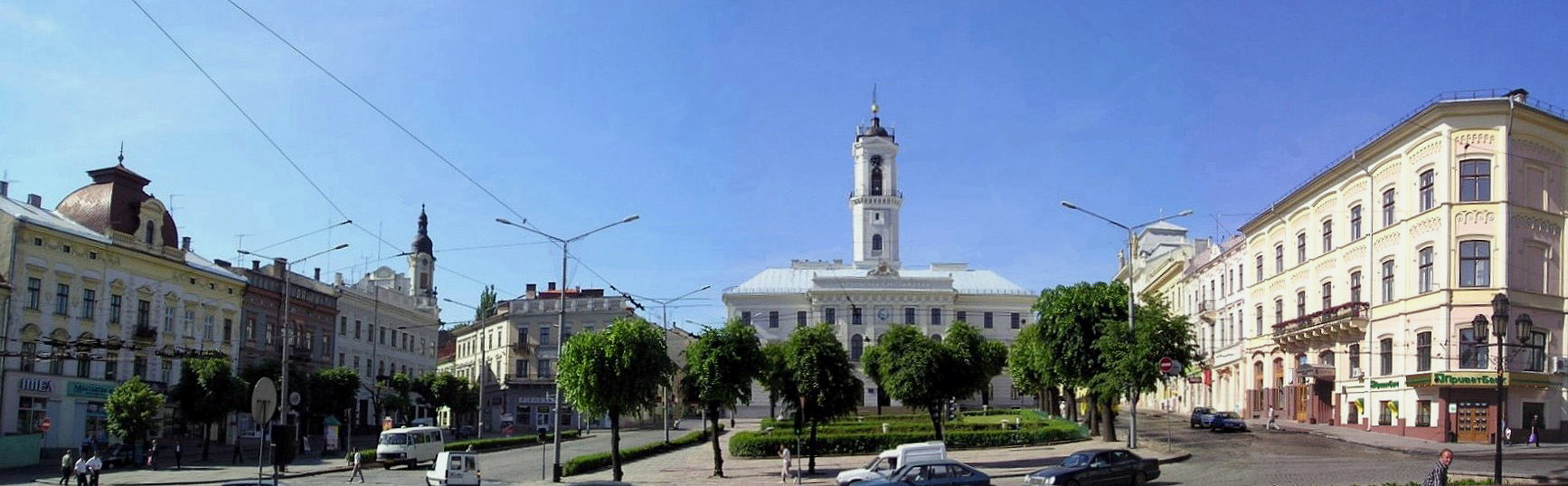
Tsentralna Square

The main architectural attractions of the city include: Olha Kobylianska Chernivtsi Drama Theater (1905); Chernivtsi Town Hall (1847); the Residence of Bukovinian and Damatian Metropolitans (the building of Chernivtsi University)—UNESCO World Heritage Site (1882); Chernivtsi University Botanical Garden (1877); the Regional Museum of Fine Arts—the former savings bank (1900); the building of the Regional Council—former Palace of Justice (1906); and the Chernivtsi Palace of Culture—former Jewish National House (1908); among many others. The Moorish Revival Czernowitz Synagogue was heavily damaged by fire in 1941, the walls were used to create the "Chernivtsi" movie theater.

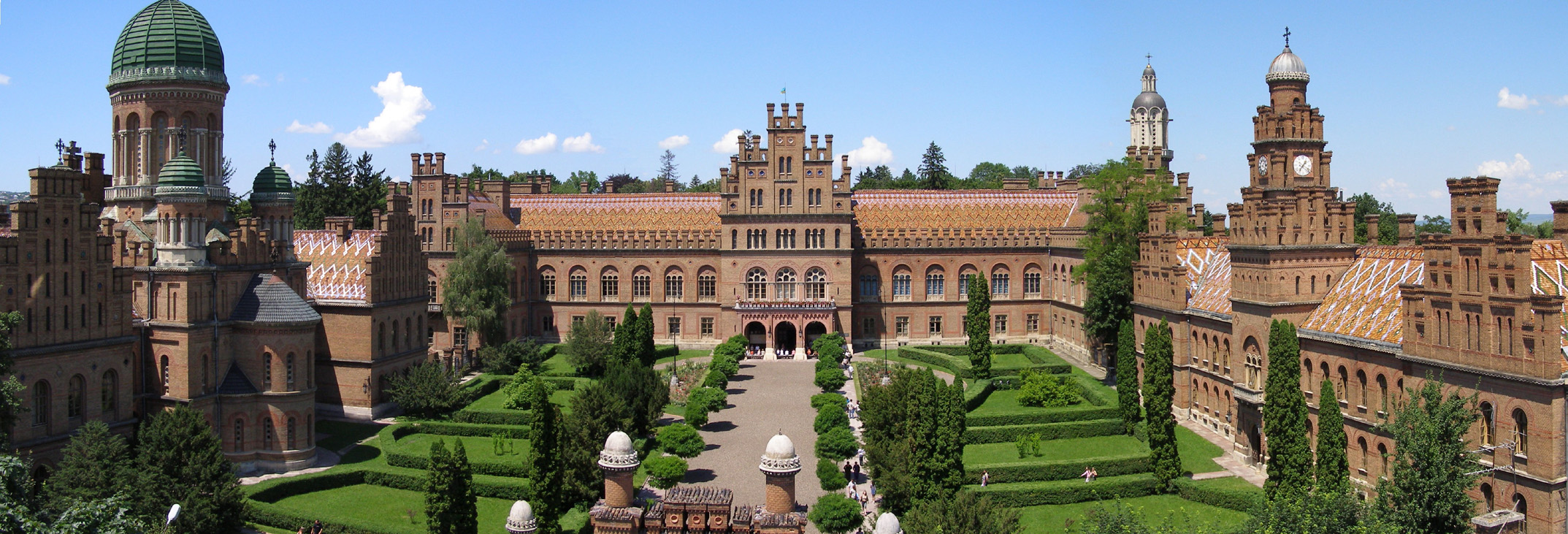
Chernivtsi University

The Czech architect Josef Hlávka designed, in 1864–1882, the buildings that currently house the Chernivtsi State University. They were originally the residence of the Bukovinian and Dalmatian Metropolitans. The Romanesque and Byzantine architecture is embellished with Ukrainian traditional architecture and motifs of Ukrainian folk art; for example, the tile roof patterns duplicate the geometric designs of traditional Ukrainian embroidery.

=== Polish National House in Chernivtsi ===
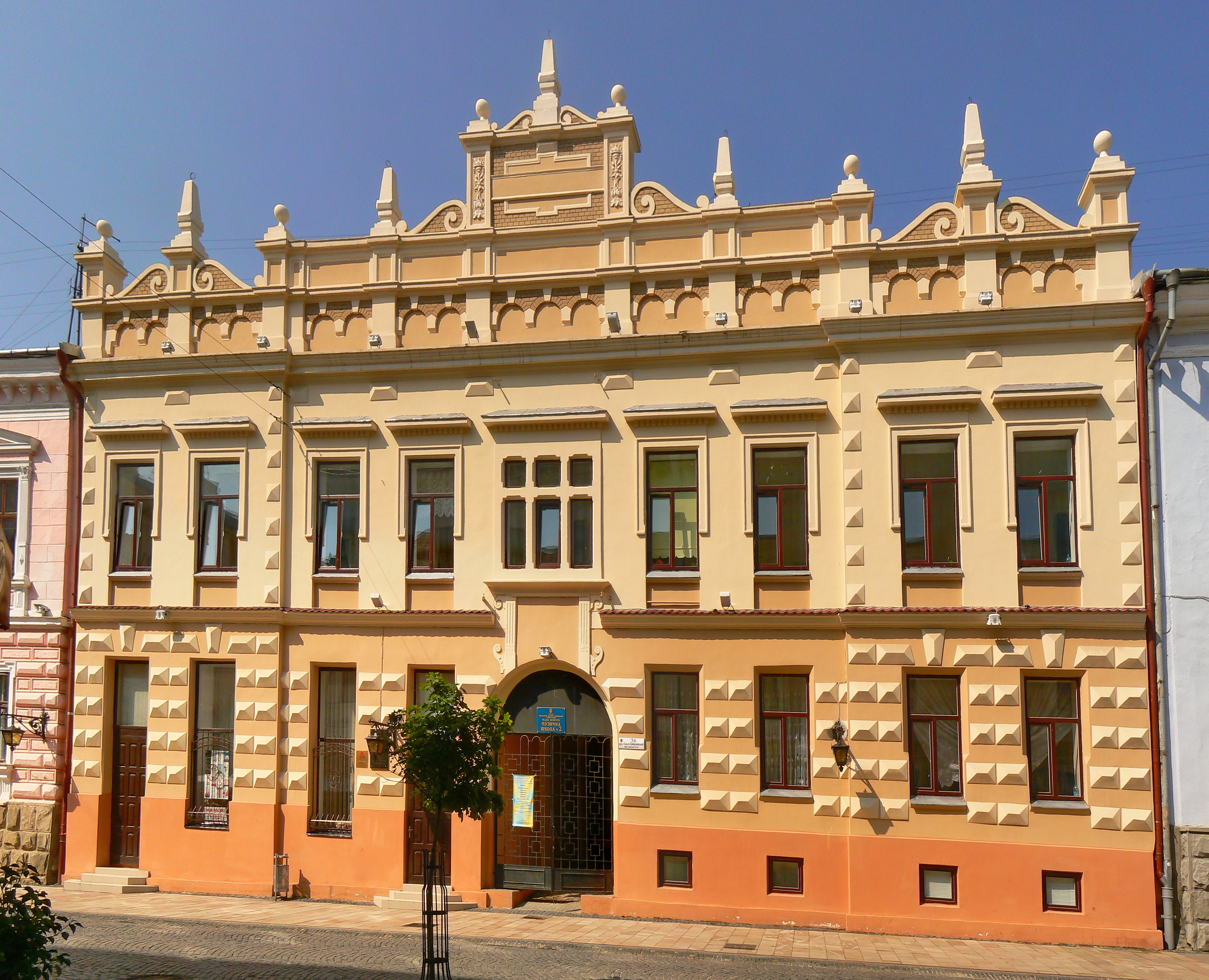
Polish House in Chernivtsi

The history of the Polish community in Chernivtsi dates back to the late 18th century, when authorities of the Habsburg Empire encouraged Poles to move to Bucovina. By the mid-19th century, several Polish organizations existed in the city, including Bratnia Pomoc (Brotherly Aid) and Czytelnia Polska (Polish Reading Room). On the initiative of publishers of the Gazeta Polska daily newspaper, collection of money for the construction of Polish House was initiated. In the early 20th century, two Polish activists, doctor Tadeusz Mischke and judge Jakub Simonowicz purchased a house. In 1904, its expansion was initiated. It was carried out by architect Franciszek Skowron, interior decorator Konrad Górecki and sculptors from Zakopane, Skwarnicki and Gerasimowicz. The expansion was completed in 1905, and Polish House operated until World War II.

In 1945, Soviet authorities opened here a cinema, later a music school. Currently, the complex houses Adam Mickiewicz Association of Polish Culture.

Apart from the Polish House, Chernivtsi also has German, Romanian and Jewish Houses.

=== German National House in Chernivtsi ===
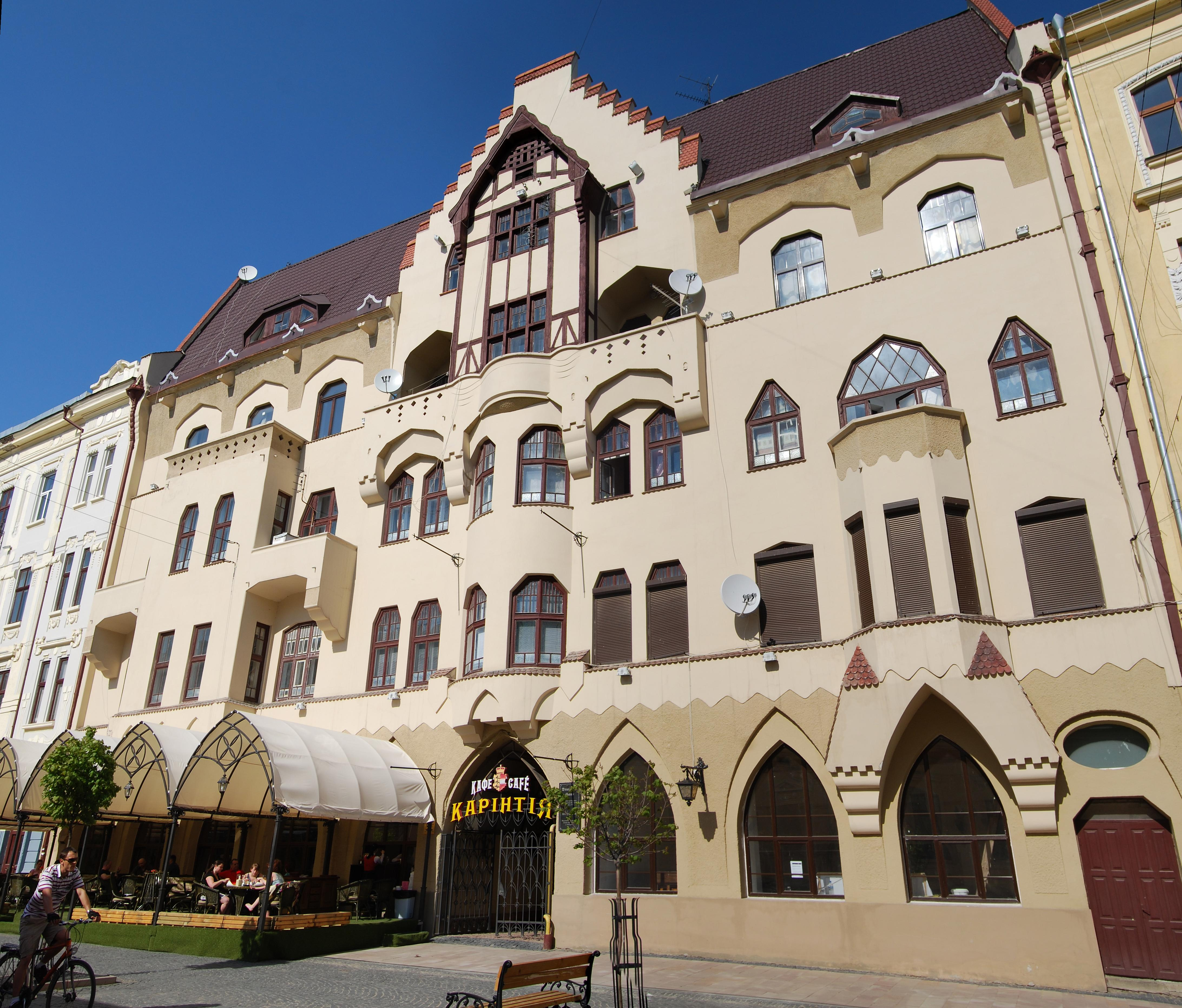
German House in Chernivtsi

It was built in the early 20th century by the union of the German community in Chernivtsi, which became the center of German cultural and social life in Chernivtsi and Bukovina. The German House was built in 1908–1910 according to plans developed by architect Gustav Fric. The building measures 1700 square metres, 25,000 cubic metres. built as a profitable house and a partnership house for 700,000 kroons on the site of the old German school building. The German House also had its own bank, and its own printing house, where various books, brochures, newspapers, and magazines were published, including the newspaper "German diary", which was popular at the time.

=== Jewish National House in Chernivtsi ===
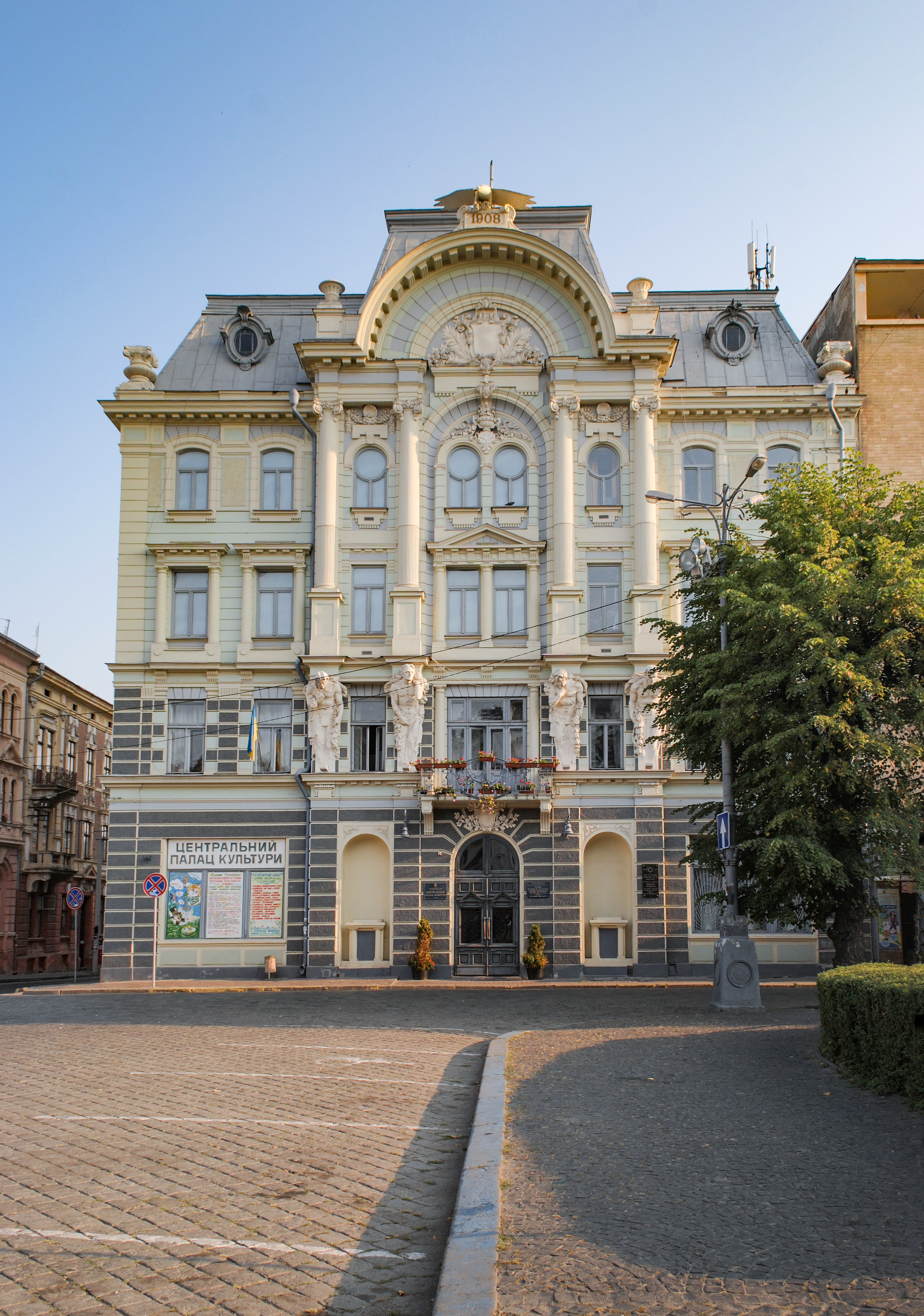
The Jewish National House in recent years.

The house was built in 1908 by the Jewish community and until the Second World War, it was the centre of Jewish life in Chernivtsi and home to various Jewish associations and organisations. At least 45,000 Jews from the Bukovina region fell victim to mass shootings, forced labour and deportations beginning in 1941. With the advent of the Soviet government (1944), the building was transferred to the City House of Culture. Today it is the Central Palace of Culture of Chernivtsi

Examples of architecture in the city center
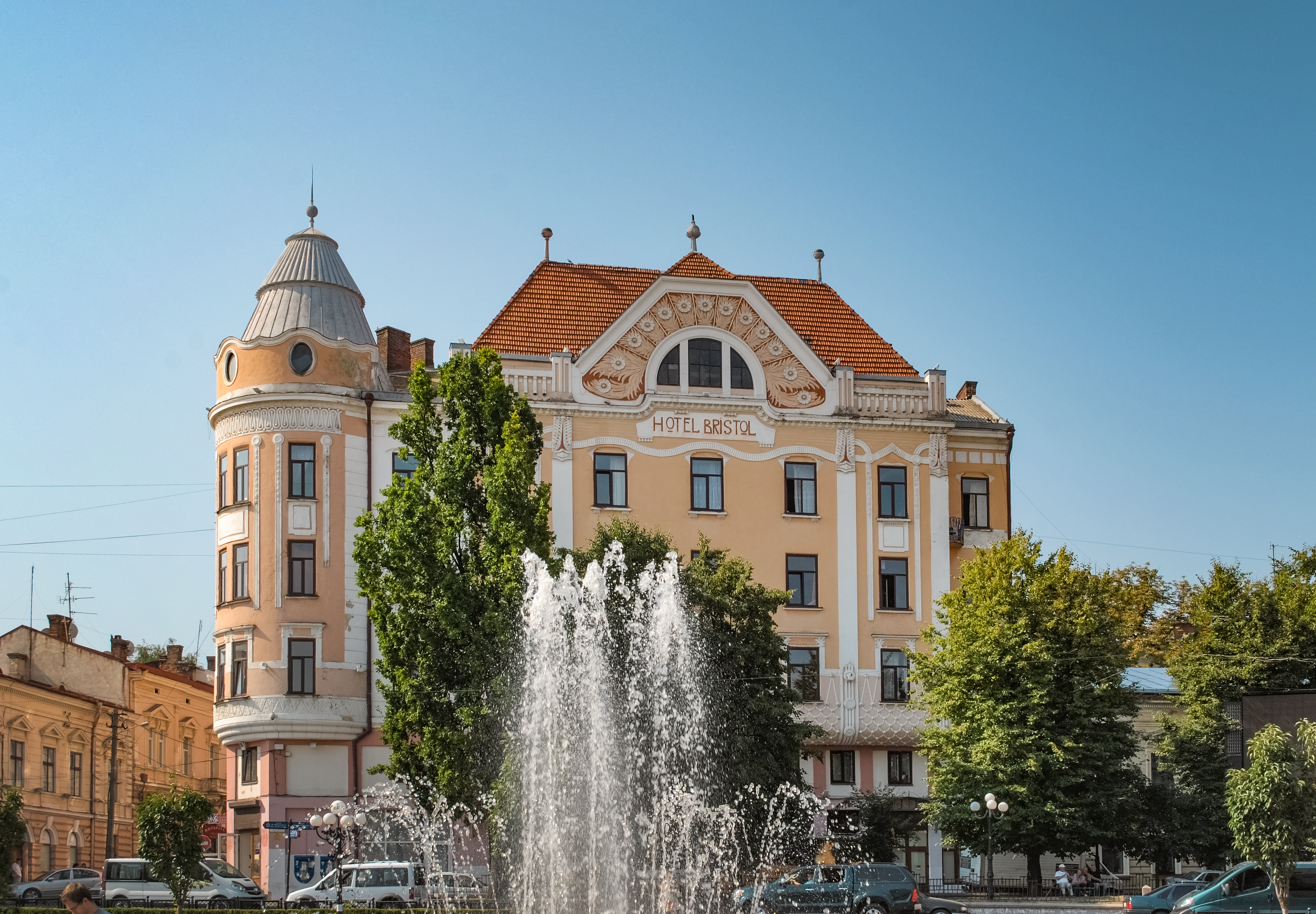

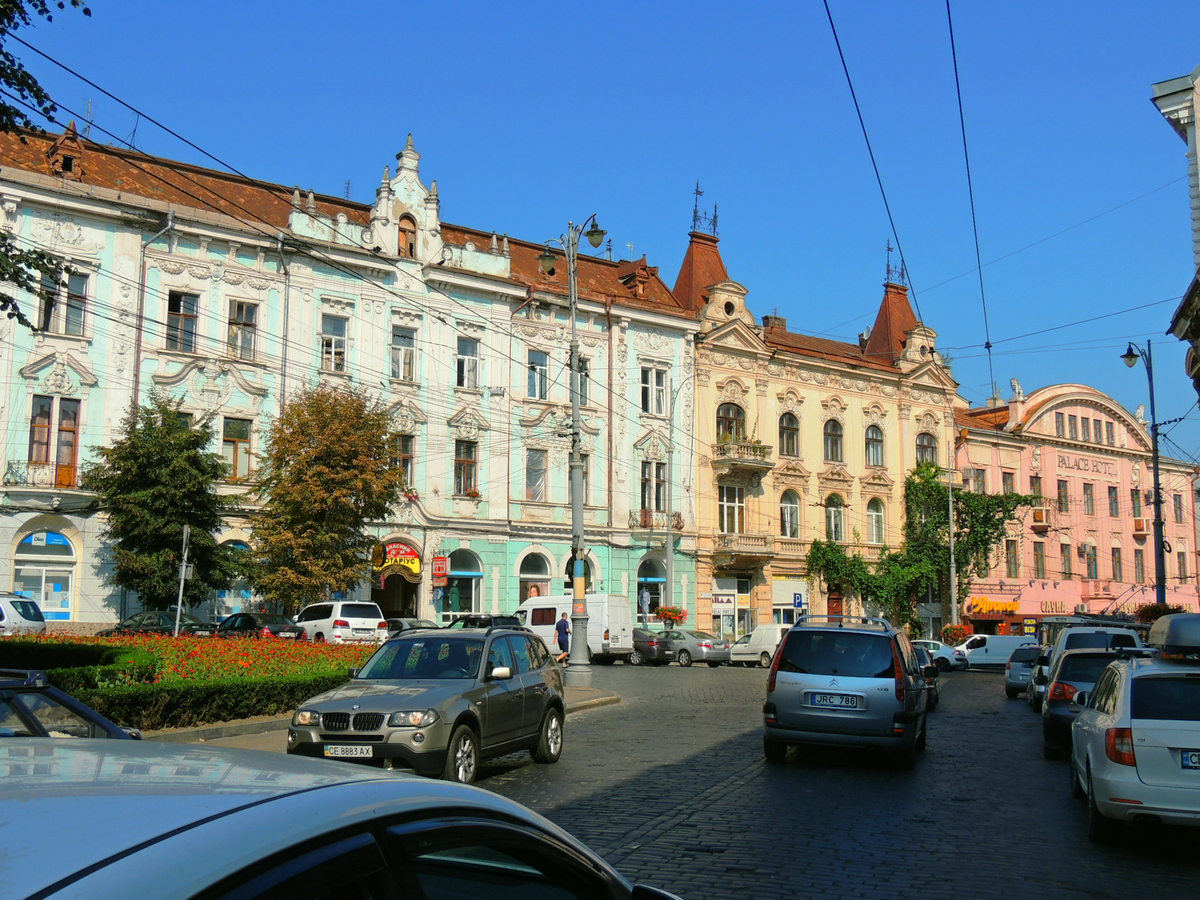

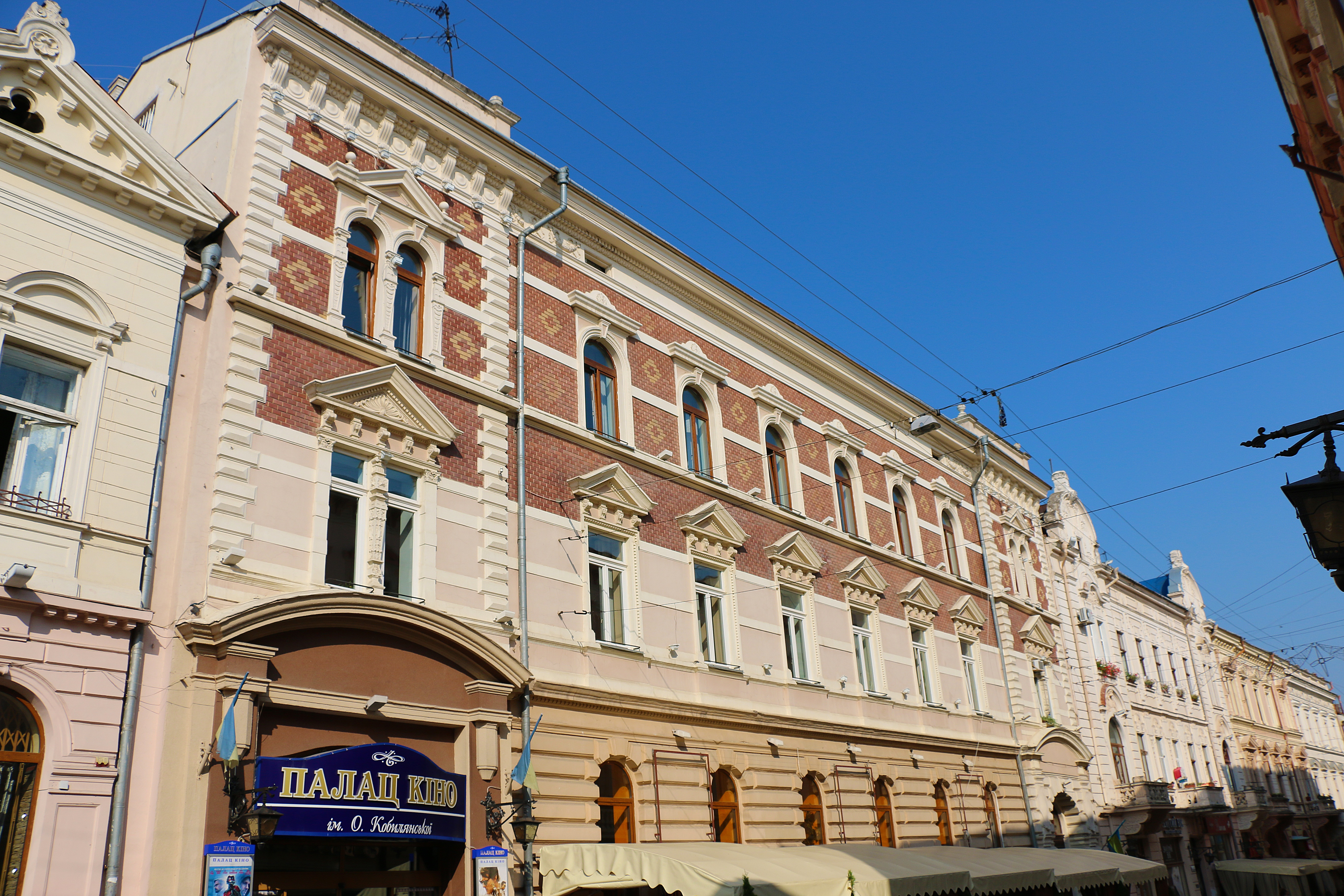

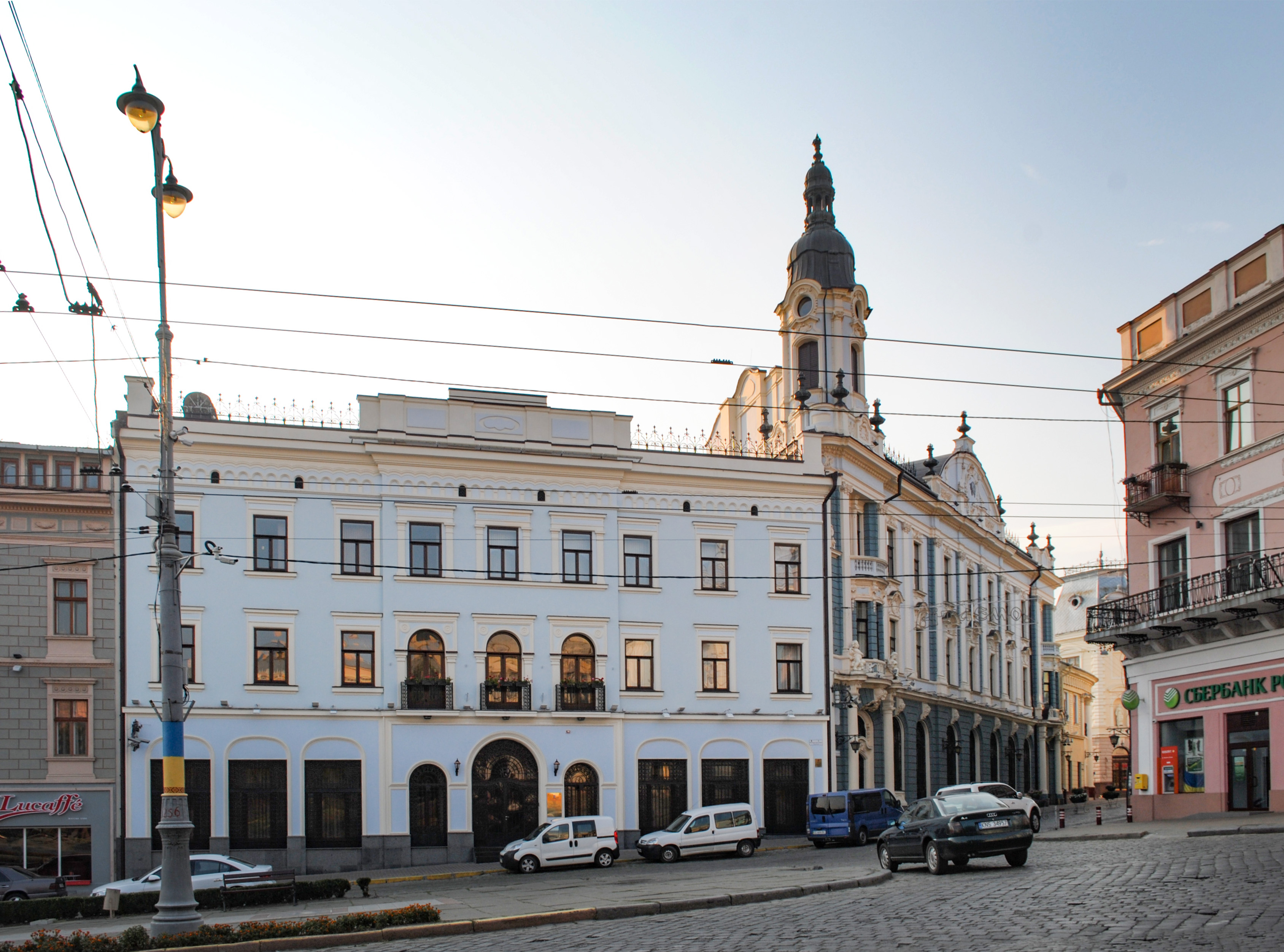

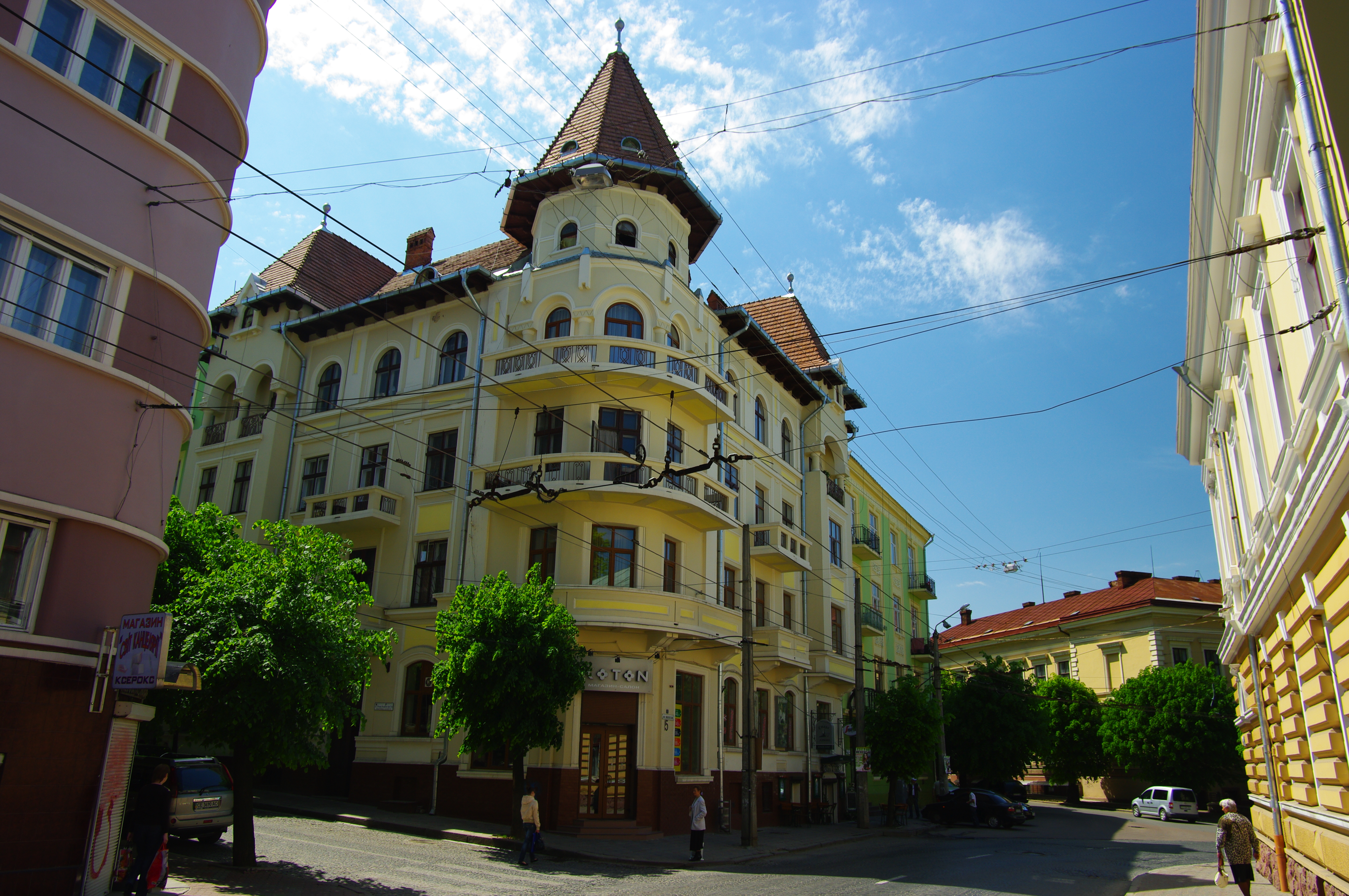

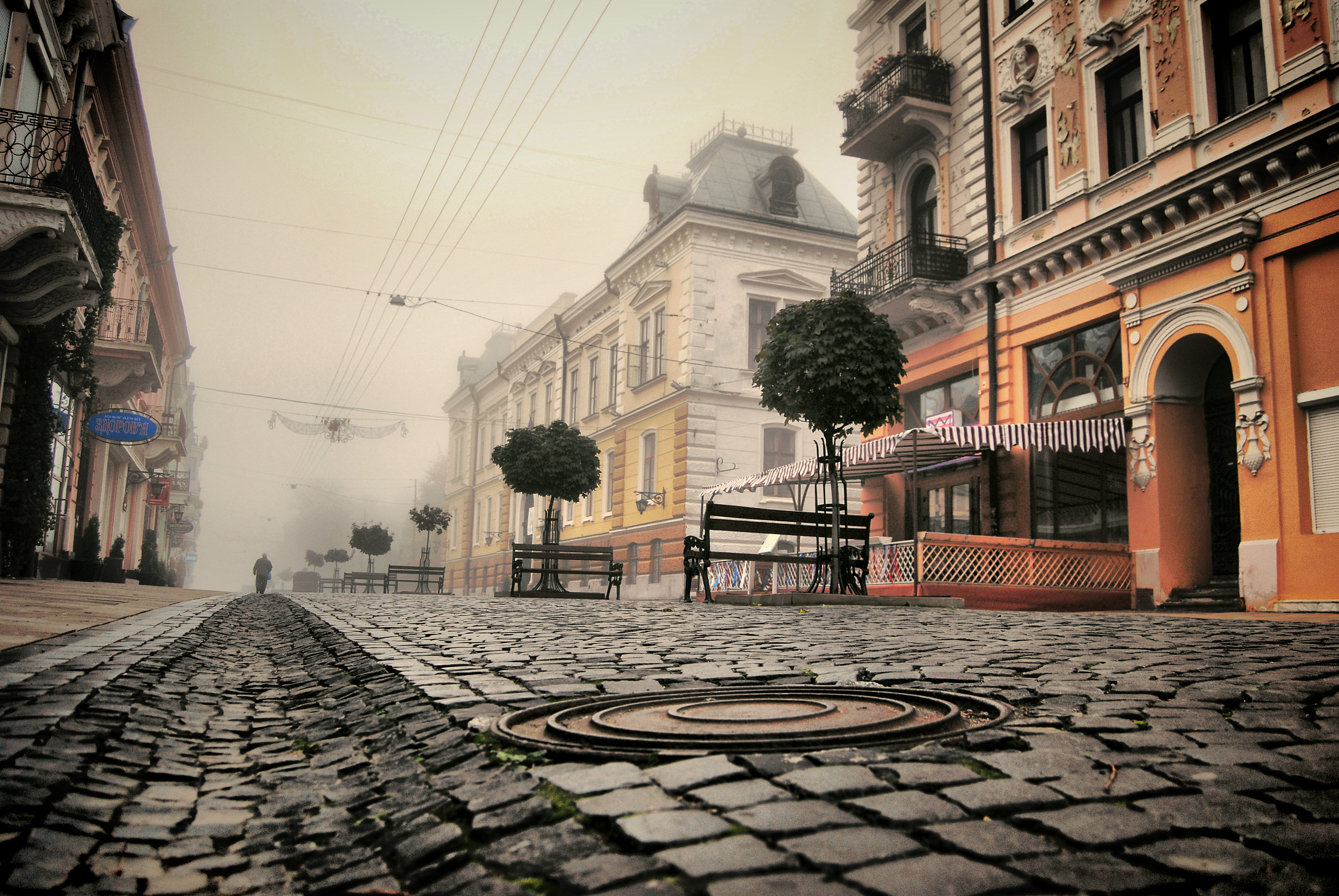

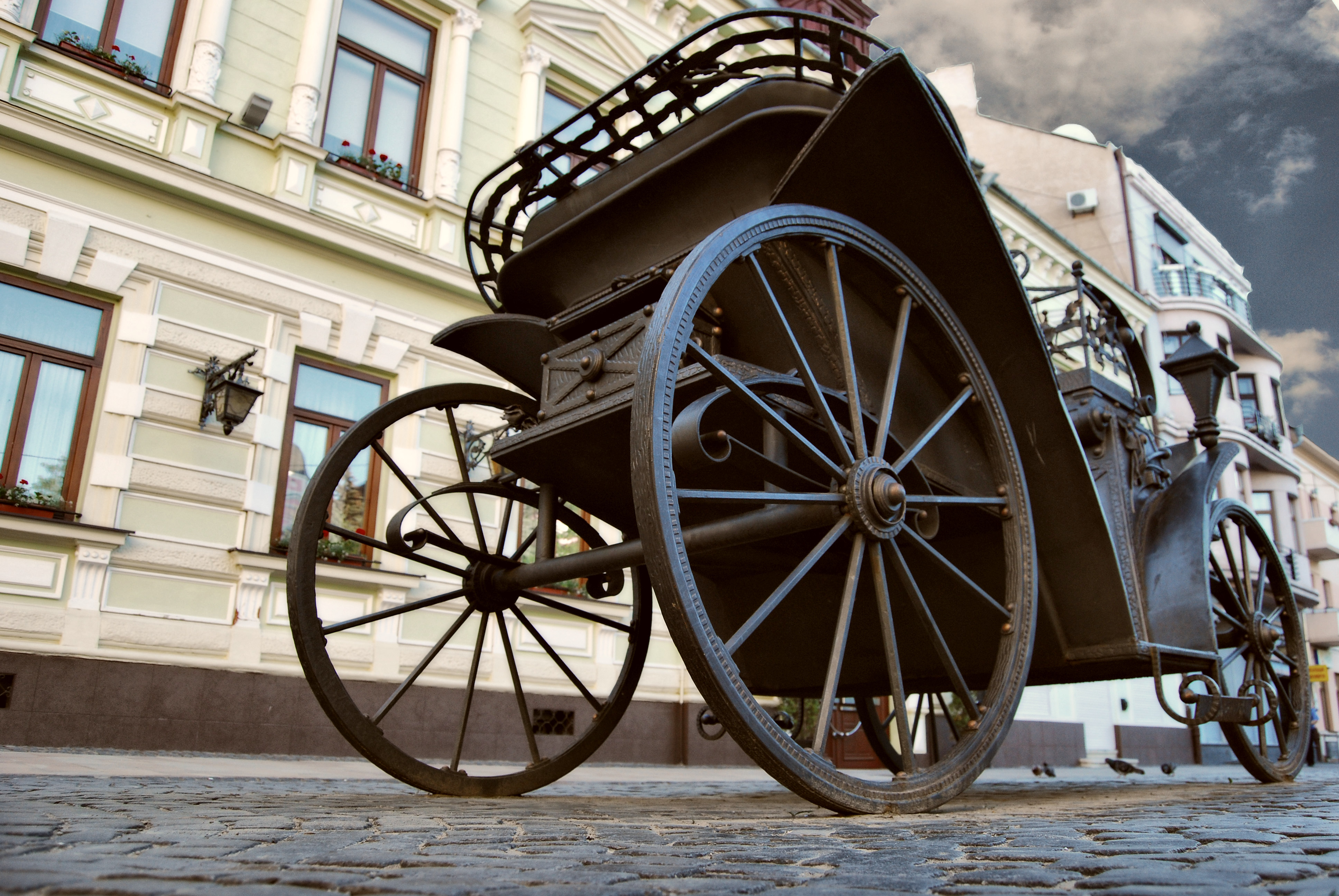

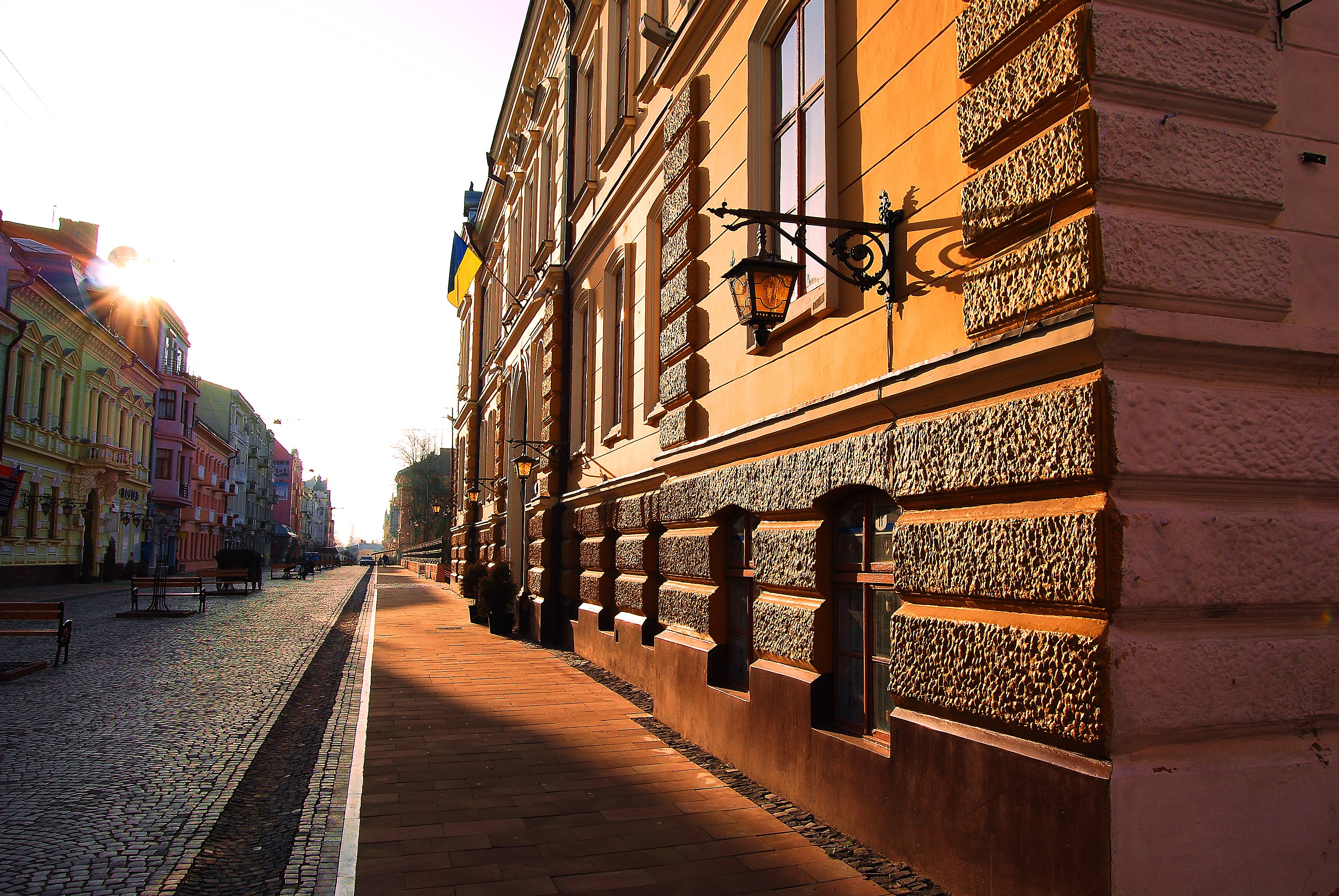

== Religion ==
Religion in Chernivtsi (2024)
1. Eastern Orthodox Christianity 77.5 (76.4%)
2. Eastern Catholic Church 12.5 (12.3%)
3. Roman Catholic Church 4 (3.94%)
4. Protestantism 1.5 (1.48%)
5. Judaism 1.5 (1.48%)
6. Islam 0.25 (0.25%)
7. Other religions and non-religious individuals 1.25 (1.23%)
8. Difficult to say 3 (2.96%)
- Cathedral of the Holy Spirit (Sviato-Dukhivskyi Cathedral) is a cathedral of the Ukrainian Orthodox Church (Moscow Patriarchate) in Chernivtsi. The first stone in its foundation was laid in July 1844. The construction was carried out under the supervision of local engineer Adolf Marin and Viennese architect Anton Röll. In 1860 the facade of the church was rebuilt under the design of Josef Hlavka. Twenty years after the work began in July 1864, Bishop Eugene Hackmann consecrated the cathedral. However, interior decoration work continued until the end of the century. In 1892–1896, a group of artists from Vienna painted the walls. It was built in the style of the Italian Renaissance, based on one of the projects of the St. Isaac's Cathedral, which was presented to Bishop Hakman.
- The Ukrainian Greek Catholic Church has an increasingly large number of believers in Chernivtsi. UGCC has several churches in the city. The main temple representing the church in Bukovina is the Cathedral of the Assumption of the Blessed Virgin Mary, completed in 1821. On 12 September 2017, Pope Francis confirmed the decision of the Synod of Bishops of the UGCC to establish a separate Chernivtsi eparchy and to appoint Yosafat Moschych as its Bishop.
- The Armenian Catholic Saints Peter and Paul Church was built and consecrated in 1875. In 1979, it was included on the list of architectural monuments of national significance. Since 1987, it houses the organ hall of Chernivtsi Philarmonic.
- Basilica of the Exaltation of the Holy Cross is a Roman Catholic church with the status of a minor basilica, the first stone building of the city. At the time of Bukovina's annexation to Austria in 1774, there were no Roman Catholic churches in the province. The first holy mass was held at the wooden house of General Gabriel von Spleny, the first Austrian governor of Bukovina, attended by only a small number of Roman Catholics. In 1778, the building of the first Catholic church in Chernivtsi was completed. The architectural structure of the Church of the Exaltation of the Holy Cross is characterized by classic features.

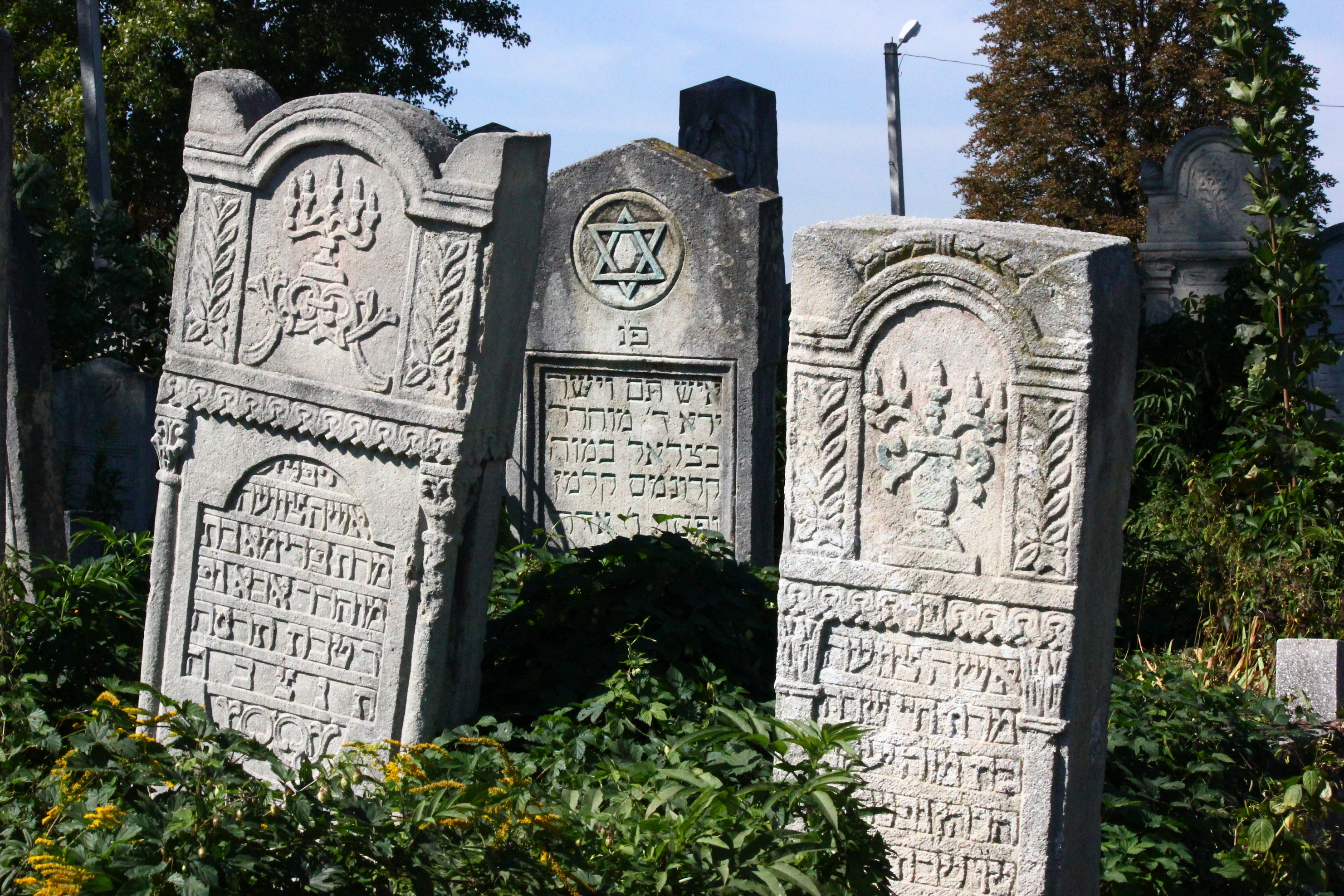
Tombstones at the Jewish cemetery of Chernivtsi.

The Residence of Bukovinian and Dalmatian Metropolitans is included in the UNESCO list of Architectural Heritage.

== Education ==
Chernivtsi is a known scientific and educational center in Western Ukraine. Research Institutes of Thermoelectricity, the Institute of Medical and Ecological Problems of the Ministry of Health Care of Ukraine, Chernivtsi National University, Bukovinian State Medical University, Trade and Economics Institute, Institute of Economics and Law, Bukovinian State Institute for Finance and Economics.

Secondary education in Chernivtsi is provided by:

- 46 high schools with the Ukrainian language of study – 97.3% of students;
- 4 high schools with the Romanian language of study – 2.7%;
- 2 private schools: Hope and Harmony.
- 3 lyceums and 7 gymnasium.

There are 5 gymnasiums, 3 lyceums, and 3 sport schools, the Municipal Center of Science, "Young Technicians" Club, "GERDAN" Theatre-Studio.

There are 15 higher educational institutions (universities, institutes, colleges). Among them:

- Yuriy Fedkovych Chernivtsi National University (19,227 students) – one of the few classic universities in the country. It was opened on 4 October 1875, according to the decree of the Austrian Emperor Franz Joseph. At that time the university consisted of three faculties: philosophical, theological and law. Today, 16 faculties and the Chernivtsi Pedagogical College within the ChNU are functioning at the university. Almost 13,000 students study in 61 specialities; the main areas of preparation are the natural sciences, and the humanities. This is the only university in the country where civilian theologians are trained.
- Bukovinian State Medical University (4321 students). The teaching process at the 42 departments is provided by 75 doctors and 321 candidates of sciences. The teaching staff provides training for 4,474 students, including 675 students from 35 countries. Foreign students are taught in English. The Faculty of Postgraduate Education trains about 800 interns and over 2000 attending physicians; the university provides continuity and continuity of higher medical education: junior specialist, bachelor, doctor-specialist, master, graduate student. BSMU prepares specialists in the specialties "Medical Affairs", "Pediatrics", "Dentistry", "Medical Psychology", "Clinical Pharmacy", "Pharmacy", "Nursing", "Laboratory diagnostics".
- Chernivtsi Trade-Economics Institute of the Kyiv National University of Trade and Economics (2315 students). The university trains specialists in the field of internal and foreign trade, restaurant business, state financial system and law, customs service, antitrust activity, business economics, banking and insurance, tax and accounting and control, audit, tourism, hospitality, household and other links in the infrastructure.
- Bukovinian University (the first private higher educational institution in the region) – 1,273 students.
- Bukovinian State Institute for Finance and Economics – 1,268 students.
- Chernivtsi Branch of the Interregional Academy of Personnel Management.

== Sports ==
The most popular kinds of sports in Chernivtsi include archery, judo, field hockey, karate, power-lifting and orienteering. Chernivtsi's baseball, ice hockey, and football clubs (FC Bukovyna Chernivtsi) are participants in the Ukrainian national championships.

Chernivtsi has a large number of sports establishments and facilities, including five stadiums, 186 sports grounds, two tennis courts, eleven football fields, five skating rinks, 21 shooting galleries, three swimming pools, 69 gyms, 62 gyms with special training equipment, and an international motorcycle racing track.

Over 7,950 inhabitants are members of sport clubs within the city, and more than 50,000 people participate in various sport activities. Currently, eight sportsmen from the city are members of national teams and twelve are members of national youth teams. Three athletes from Chernivtsi were prize-winners in various world tournaments, two were winners of European and 42 of national championships in 2002.

Chernivtsi has been host to the Sidecross World Championship a number of times, most recently in June 2010.

== Transport ==
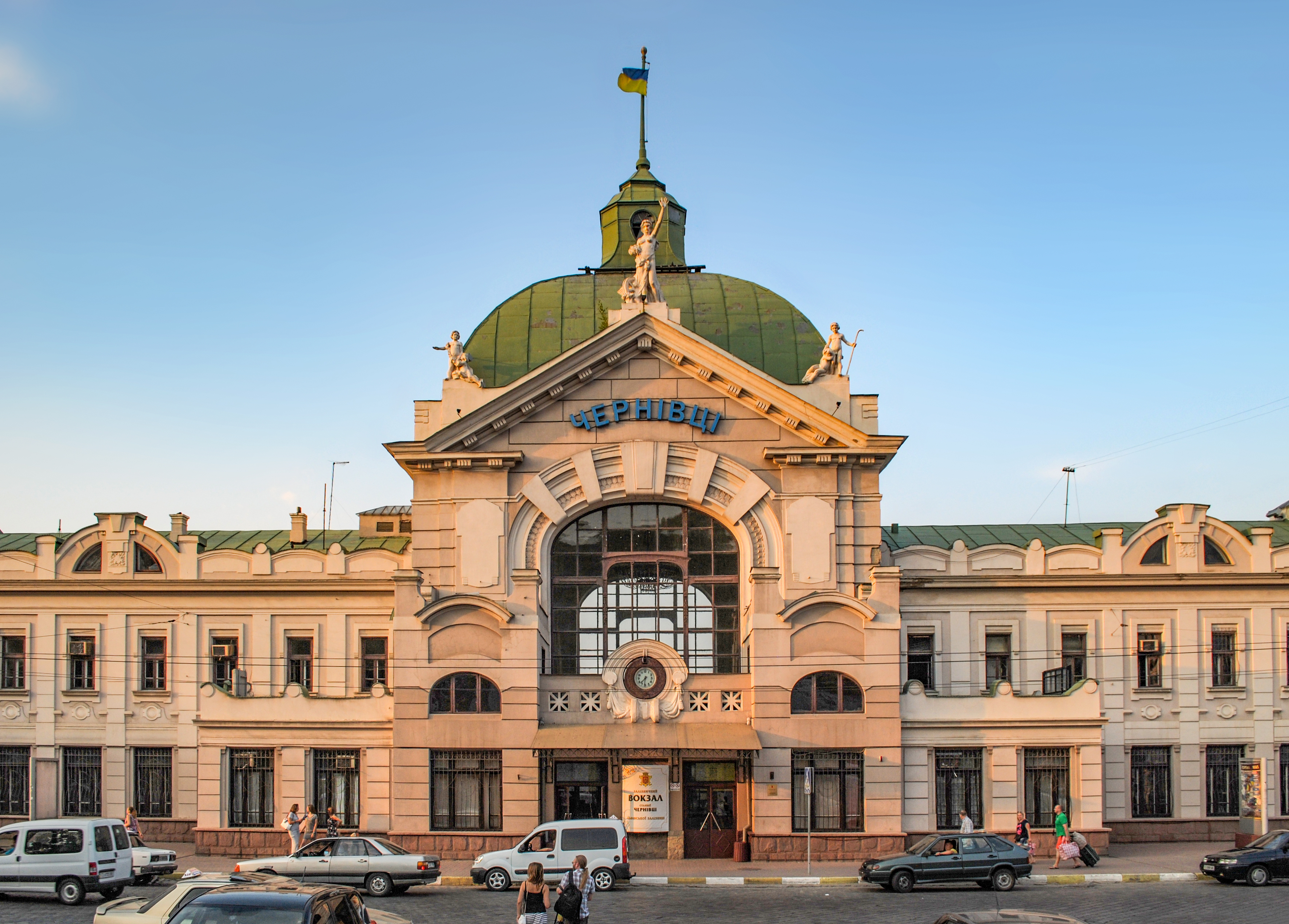
Central Train Station in Chernivtsi.

Chernivtsi has two main modes of public transport: buses and trolleybuses. All modes of transport cost approximately $0.20. In 2018, Chernivtsi began testing hybrid trolleybuses. The new trolleybuses are designed to improve the public transport system of Chernivtsi by making it more energy-efficient, as well as covering the part of the town which currently has no trolleybus lines. In 2023, the municipal transit operator introduced electronic fare cards for use on its vehicles.

=== Rail ===
There are three railway stations in Chernivtsi: Chernivtsi station (38 Vokzalna Street., 1.5 km (0.93 mi) north from the centre), Chernivtsi-Pivnichna Railway station (Zavods'ka street, 13 (northwest 3 km [1.9 mi]) and Chernivtsi-Pivdenna Railway station (Malovokzalna street, 21 (south 5 km [3.1 mi])

=== Air ===
Chernivtsi is served by the Chernivtsi International Airport (CWC) located 6 km (3.7 mi) south of the city centre (Kadeniuka street, 30).

=== Road ===
Chernivtsi has access to the M19 highway, which is part of the European route E85, which links it to Bucharest (south) and Ternopil and Lutsk (north). Moreover, the H03 and H10 highways link Chernivtsi to other cities in Ukraine, the former connecting it to the capital city of Kyiv, which is located about 500 kilometres (310 mi) north-east of Chernivtsi.

== Twin towns – sister cities ==
The first international contacts with the city were established on 20 July 1989, when then-Mayor of Chernivtsi City Council Pavel Kaspruk, signed a twinning agreement with the Mayor of Salt Lake City (USA) – Lowell Turner. To commemorate this event, the Cradle of Peace was erected in Chernivtsi.

Chernivtsi is twinned with:

- Bălți, Moldova
- Bari, Italy
- Chișinău, Moldova
- Cluj-Napoca, Romania
- Düsseldorf, Germany
- Iași, Romania
- İzmir, Turkey
- Klagenfurt, Austria
- Konin, Poland
- Mannheim, Germany
- Metz, France
- Netanya, Israel
- Nof HaGalil, Israel
- Rueil-Malmaison, France
- Salt Lake City, United States
- Saskatoon, Canada
- Suceava, Romania
- Timișoara, Romania
- Wolfsberg, Austria

=== Former twin cities ===
In February 2016 the Chernivtsi city council terminated its twinned relations with the Russian cities Bryansk and Podolsk due to the Russo-Ukrainian War.

== Notable people ==
=== Natives ===
- Sophia Agranovich, American classical concert pianist, Centaur Records recording artist and music educator
- Aharon Appelfeld (1932–2018), Jewish writer
- Zamfir Arbore (1848–1933), Romanian politician
- Ninon Ausländer (1895–1966), art historian and wife of Hermann Hesse
- Rose Ausländer (1901–1988), Jewish German-language writer
- Elyakim Badian (1925–2000), Israeli politician
- Leon Birnbaum (1918–2010), Romanian mathematician and philosopher
- Charles K. Bliss (1897–1985), inventor of Blissymbolics
- Klara Blum (1904–1971), Jewish German-language writer in Austria, the Soviet Union, and China
- Dmitry Borisov, Russian journalist
- Ion Bostan (1914–1992), Romanian film director
- Octav Botnar (1913–1998), Romanian businessman, philanthropist, billionaire
- Josef Burg (1912–2009), last Yiddish poet in Chernivtsi
- Paul Celan (1920–1970), German-language poet and translator
- Erwin Chargaff (1905–2002), Jewish biochemist
- Eugen Ehrlich (1862–1922), Jewish jurist, pioneer of the field of sociology of law
- Natalia Fedner (born 1983), Ukrainian-American fashion designer
- Moysey Fishbeyn (1947–2020), a Ukrainian poet
- Maria Forescu (1875–1943/1947), Romanian opera singer and film actress
- Rudolf Gerlach-Rusnak (1895–1960), German operatic and concert lyrical tenor
- Max Glücksmann (1875–1946), Argentine Jewish pioneer of the music and film industries
- George Grigorovici (1871–1950), Romanian politician
- Radu Grigorovici (1911–2008), Romanian physicist
- Dmytro Hnatyuk (1925–2016), a Ukrainian baritone opera singer
- Alexandru N. Hurmuzachi (1869–1946), Romanian politician
- Constantin N. Hurmuzachi (1863–1937), Romanian biologist
- Doxuță Hurmuzachi (1845–1931), Romanian jurist and politician
- Frederick John Kiesler (1890–1965), a theater designer, artist, theoretician and architect
- Ruth Klieger Aliav (1914–1979), Romanian-Israeli Jewish activist
- Sam Kogan (1946–2004), stage director, actor and founding principal of the Academy of the Science of Acting and Directing in London
- Renata Kallosh (born 1943), theoretical physicist
- Mila Kunis (born 1983), American actress
- Elena Leușteanu (1935–2008), Romanian Olympic gymnast
- Ani Lorak (born 1978), Ukrainian singer, songwriter, actress
- Eusebius Mandyczewski (1857–1929), Ukrainian-Romanian musicologist and composer
- Itzik Manger (1901–1969), Yiddish writer
- Georg Marco (1863–1923), Austrian chess player and author
- Meinhard E. Mayer (1929–2011), Romanian-American mathematician and physicist, professor emeritus of Physics and Mathematics at the University of California
- Volodymyr Melnykov (born 1951), Ukrainian poet, writer and composer
- Karol Mikuli (1821–1897), Polish-Romanian musician of Armenian descent
- Jan Mikulicz-Radecki (1850–1905), Polish surgeon
- Ingrid Nargang (1929–2019), Austrian lawyer and contemporary historian
- Dan Pagis (1930–1986), Israeli writer
- Emil Paur (1855–1932), conductor
- Elena Pătrășcanu (1914–2000), Romanian stage designer
- Traian Popovici (1892–1946), Romanian lawyer, mayor of Chernivtsi, and a Righteous Among the Nations for saving 20,000 Jews during the Holocaust
- Iacob Pistiner, lawyer and Member of the Romanian Parliament in the interwar years
- Aron Pumnul (1818–1866), Romanian philologist and teacher, national and revolutionary activist
- Bernard Reder, sculptor
- Markus Reiner (1886–1976), one of the founders of rheology
- Gregor von Rezzori (1914–1998), German-language writer of Sicilian-Austrian origin
- Ludwig Rottenberg (1864–1932), conductor and composer
- Maximilien Rubel (1905–1996), Marxist historian
- Ioan Victor Stârcea (1867-1944), Austro-Hungarian diplomat and Romanian minister
- Lev Shekhtman (born 1951), Russian-American theater director and actor
- Ze'ev Sherf (1904–1984), Israeli Minister of Finance
- Jan Tabachnyk (1945–2023), singer and composer
- Sidi Tal (1912–1983), singer and actress
- Inna Tsymbalyuk (born 1985), Ukrainian model and actress; semifinalist at Miss Universe 2006.
- Viorica Ursuleac (1894–1985), Romanian opera singer (dramatic soprano)
- Inna Vernikov (Born 1984) New York City councilwoman
- Sofia Vicoveanca (born 1941), Romanian singer of popular music from the Bukovina region
- Roman Vlad (1919–2013) Romanian-Italian composer, pianist, and musicologist
- Sydir Vorobkevych (1836–1903) Ukrainian composer and writer
- Ruth Wisse, professor of literature
- Mariya Yaremchuk (born 1993), Ukrainian singer, represented Ukraine in the Eurovision Song Contest 2014
- Arseniy Yatsenyuk (born 1974), Ukrainian politician
- Constantin Zablovschi (1882–1967), Romanian engineer
- Frederic Zelnik (1885–1950), an important German silent movie director-producer
- Mark Berger(born 1954) Triple Master of Sport (Judo, Wrestling, Sambo) Bronze medalist in judo for the 1984 Olympics in Los Angeles. Silver 1988 World Sambo Championships

=== Residents ===
- Vasile Alecsandri, Romanian writer, diplomat and politician
- Sholem Aleichem, Yiddish writer and playwright
- Moyshe Altman (1890–1981), Yiddish writer
- Abram Anikst, Russian economist and revolutionary, People's Commissar for Labor of the Ukrainian Soviet Socialist Republic and Deputy People's Commissar of Labor of the Russian Socialist Federative Soviet Republic
- Olga Anikst, Russian revolutionary and Soviet educator, organizer of vocational education in the Russian SFSR, and the founder and first rector of the Moscow State Linguistic University
- Hermann Bahr
- George Barițiu
- Nicolae Bălan (1882–1955), Romanian cleric, a metropolitan bishop of the Romanian Orthodox Church
- Grigore Vasiliu Birlic (1905–1970), Romanian actor
- Nathan Birnbaum
- Charles K. Bliss
- Kassian Bogatyrets
- Nikolay Bogolyubov
- Traian Brăileanu (1882–1947), Romanian sociologist and politician
- Romulus Cândea (1886–1973), Romanian ecclesiastical historian
- Erwin Chargaff
- Nicolae Cotos (1883–1959), Romanian theologian
- Alexandru Ioan Cuza, first ruler of the United Romanian Principalities
- Mihai Eminescu (1850–1889), Romanian poet, novelist and journalist
- Iancu Flondor (1865–1924), Romanian activist who advocated Bukovina's unification with the Kingdom of Romania
- Jacob Frank (1726–1791), Polish rabbi and founder of Frankism
- Ivan Franko
- Karl Emil Franzos (1848–1904), Jewish writer and publicist, grew up in Chernivtsi and wrote a literary memorial of the Jewish ghetto, The Jews of Barnow
- Constantin Isopescu-Grecul (1871–1938), Romanian jurist, politician and journalist
- Gala Galaction (1879–1961), Romanian writer
- Abraham Goldfaden, active here
- Zygmunt Gorgolewski
- Ion Grămadă (1886–1917) Romanian writer, historian and journalist
- Marian Hadenko (1955–2021), Ukrainian singer, songwriter and composer
- Maximilian Hacman (1877–1961), Romanian jurist
- Hans Hahn
- Eudoxiu Hurmuzachi (1812–1874), Romanian historian, politician (Landeshauptmann of Bukovina) and patriot
- Volodymyr Ivasyuk (1949–1979), Ukrainian singer, songwriter and poet
- Joseph Kalmer (1898–1959), Austrian writer, poet and translator
- Mihail Kogălniceanu, Romanian historian and politician, Prime Minister of Romania
- Leonid Kravchuk, first President of Ukraine from 1991 to 1994
- Olha Kobylyanska
- Zvi Laron
- Vasile Luca (1898–1963), Soviet and Romanian communist politician
- Anastasiya Markovich (born 1979), painter
- George Mihalcheon
- Karol Mikuli (1821–1892), Romanian pianist and composer, student of Frédéric Chopin
- Ivan Mykolaychuk (1941–1987)
- Grigore Nandriș (1895–1968), Romanian linguist, philologist and memoirist
- Miron Nicolescu (1903–1975), Romanian mathematician
- Ion Nistor (1876–1962), Romanian historian and politician
- Aurel Onciul
- Dimitrie Onciul (1856–1923), Romanian historian
- Dimitrie Petrino
- Israel Polack
- George Popovici (1863–1905), Romanian agrarian politician, jurist and poet
- Ciprian Porumbescu (1853–1883), Romanian composer
- Aron Pumnul (1818–1866), Romanian philologist and teacher, national and revolutionary activist
- Sextil Pușcariu
- Florin Piersic (born 1936), Romanian actor and TV personality
- Wilhelm Reich (1897–1957), Jewish psychoanalyst and sexologist, born in Dobrzanica, went to school in Chernivtsi
- Eric Roll, Baron Roll of Ipsden (1907–2005),
- Sofia Rotaru (born 1947), Romanian-Ukrainian pop singer
- Wojciech Rubinowicz
- Ion G. Sbiera (1836–1916), Romanian folklorist and historian
- Joseph Schmidt (1904–1942) singer, actor and cantor
- Fritz von Scholz (1896–1944), SS officer
- Joseph Schumpeter (1883–1950), economist and Minister of Finance, 1909–1911, professor in Chernivtsi
- Georg Wassilko von Serecki
- Gheorghe Sion, Romanian writer
- Nissan Spivak
- Wilhelm Stekel (1868–1940), Jewish psychoanalyst and sexologist, born in Boiany, grew up in Chernivtsi and attended the Gymnasium (grammar school)
- Benno Straucher
- Vasile Tărâțeanu (1945–2022), Romanian journalist and writer
- Emilian Voiutschi
- Salo Weisselberger
- Ihor Yakivyuk (born 1968), Ukrainian builder, civil engineer
- Nazariy Yaremchuk (1951–1995), Hutsul singer
- Léon d'Ymbault (c. 1700–1781), mayor
