= Nicolae Bălan =

Metropolitan bishop of the Romanian Orthodox Church (1882 - 1955)

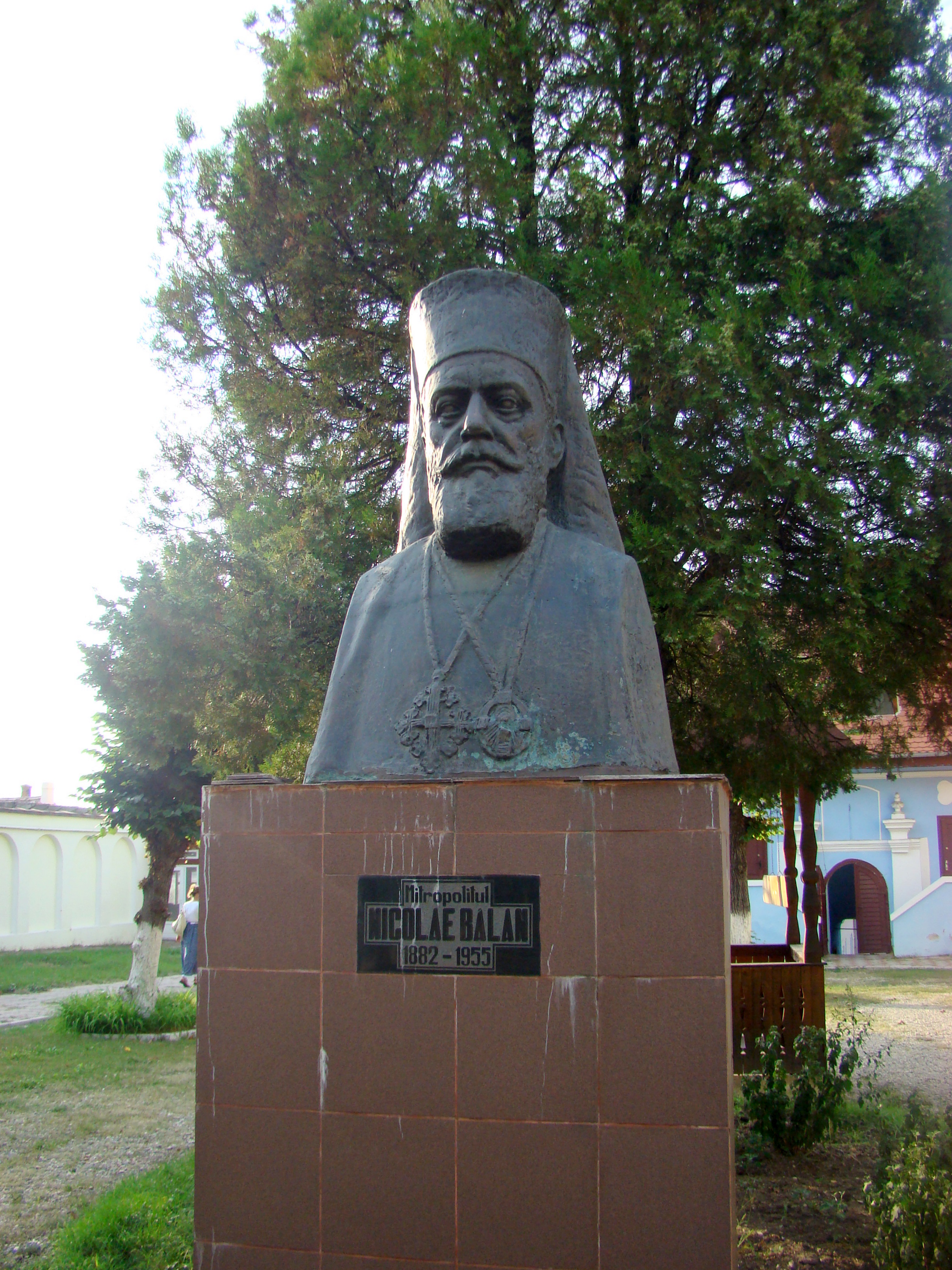
- Bust of Bălan in Sibiu
- Church: Romanian Orthodox Church
- Archdiocese: Sibiu
- Metropolis: Transylvania
- Installed: 30 May 1920
- Term ended: 6 August 1955
- Predecessor: Vasile Mangra
- Successor: Iustin Moisescu

Orders
- Ordination: 1919
- Consecration: 30 May 1920

Personal details
- Born: April 27, 1882 Felsőbalázsfalva, Beszterce-Naszód County, Austria-Hungary (now Blăjenii de Sus, Bistrița-Năsăud County, Romania)
- Died: August 6, 1955 (aged 73) Sibiu, Romanian People's Republic
- Denomination: Eastern Orthodox Church
- Profession: Theologian
- Education: Czernowitz University

Nicolae Bălan (Romanian pronunciation: [nikoˈla.e bəˈlan]; April 27, 1882 – August 6, 1955) was an Austro-Hungarian-born Romanian cleric, a metropolitan bishop of the Romanian Orthodox Church. The son of a priest, he graduated from Czernowitz University and taught theology at Sibiu from 1905 to 1920. That year, he became Metropolitan of Transylvania, an office he would hold for the rest of his life. In the 1930s, he was an open supporter of the Iron Guard. In 1942, during the Holocaust, he intervened in Bucharest against the planned deportation of Romanian Jews from the Regat, Southern Transylvania and the Banat to the Nazi extermination camps. In 1948, after a communist regime was established, he publicly assisted the new authorities in their effort to disband the Romanian Greek-Catholic Church.

== Biography ==
=== Early life ===
Born in Blăjenii de Sus, Bistrița-Năsăud County, he was the first of eight children born to the priest Vasile Bălan and his wife Maria. He graduated from the Năsăud gymnasium in 1900 and attended the Theology faculty of Czernowitz University from 1900 to 1904, obtaining his doctorate there the following year. His renowned professors included the brothers Eusebiu and Constantin Clement Popovici, Emilian Voiutschi, Vasile Găină, Teodor Tarnavschi, Vasile Tarnavschi and Vasile Gheorghiu; Bălan distinguished himself as an excellent student. He attended courses on Protestant and Catholic theology at Breslau in 1904–1905. Moving to Sibiu, in 1905 he became a temporary professor at the local theological institute's department for dogma, apologetics and ethics. He secured a permanent post in 1909, and remained until 1920.

A member of the Sibiu Archdiocese's synod and of the Metropolis of Transylvania's national church council, he founded and edited Revista Teologică between 1907 and 1916. In 1918, together with two other professors, he edited Gazeta Poporului. In November 1918, as World War I neared its end, the Romanian National Council of Transylvania sent him on a mission to Iași, the temporary capital of the Romanian Old Kingdom, where he discussed the pending union of Transylvania with Romania.

=== As metropolitan bishop ===
Ordained a priest in 1919, he was elected Metropolitan of Transylvania in February 1920, and was consecrated in May. Bălan occupied this role until his death. Also in 1920, he became an honorary member of the Romanian Academy, a member of ASTRA's central committee and an ex officio Romanian Senator.

While in office, he advocated that the principles of Andrei Șaguna's organic statute, which favored ecclesiastical autonomy, be incorporated into the 1925 law and statute on the functioning of the Romanian Orthodox Church. This ended up taking place, due in part to his intervention during the Senate debate. In 1921, he elevated the theological institute to the rank of academy; this institution gained the right to emit tertiary diplomas in 1943 and achieved university rank in 1948. He coordinated the activities of the secondary schools under the jurisdiction of the metropolis until these were nationalized by the new communist regime in 1948. He founded three schools in Sibiu: a normal school for girls, a school for church singers and a boarding school. He also supervised the metropolis' three publications, one of which was founded under his tenure, in 1922. Over 150 churches and a similar number of parish houses were built in the archdiocese, with new parishes and districts being founded. An ecumenist, he attended the 1925 Stockholm Conference and the 1926 Berne Conference. In 1925, he led a pilgrimage to the Holy Land.

=== 1930s and WWII: Iron Guard, Vienna Diktat, Holocaust ===
A committed supporter of the Iron Guard, he was drawn to the movement by his friend, the priest Ioan Moța. In 1930, another priest, Iosif Trifa, spoke out against the Guard for its use of violence; Bălan dismissed Trifa from the editorship of the popular Lumina Satelor magazine. Moța, the new editor, turned this into an organ of Guardist propaganda that nearly went bankrupt within a year. At that point, Bălan restored Trifa to his old position and the magazine again flourished. In February 1937, after Moţa's son Ion Moța was killed during the Spanish Civil War, together with Vasile Marin, Bălan led a procession of some two hundred priests at the funerals of Ion Moța and Vasile Marin. In September 1940, he led prayers at a massive celebration for the Guard's late founder, Corneliu Zelea Codreanu. That November, after Ioan Moța died, he led a large funeral well-attended by Guard members.

During the Crown Council session of August 29–30, 1940, he protested against the Second Vienna Award and its cession of Northern Transylvania to Hungary, advocating the reversal of this decision during World War II.

In 1942, during the Holocaust, he was among those who protested plans for deporting Romanian Jews from the Old Kingdom, the Banat and southern Transylvania, a scheme that was ultimately not carried out.

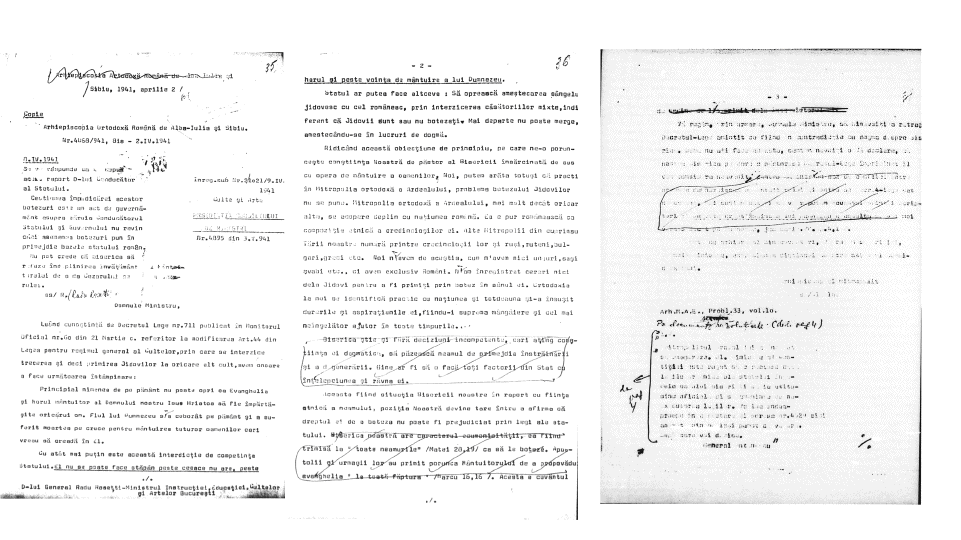
Letter written by Bălan in response to Law 711 banning the conversion of Jews passed by the Romanian Government in 1941. While protesting against what he perceives as an unacceptable interference of the State in matters of faith, Bălan also displays his own antisemitic views. In the second part of the letter he advises the State to ban all mixed marriages including those involving converts from Judaism.

=== Under communism: Greek-Catholicism, collaboration ===
The communist regime did not persecute Bălan for his Iron Guard past because he proved a useful instrument in the suppression of the Romanian Greek-Catholic Church. He had spoken out against the Greek-Catholics during the interwar period, and, partly as a means of self-preservation, held a series of sermons at the Sibiu Orthodox Cathedral in May–June 1948 calling on Greek-Catholics to join the Orthodox Church. While the previous Patriarch of All Romania, Nicodim Munteanu, who died in February 1948, had opposed such initiatives, the new patriarch, Iustinian Marina, was fully behind the effort. In May 1948, at a ceremony in Blaj marking the centenary of the assembly that gathered there during the 1848 revolution, he repeated the call to Greek-Catholics, a gesture that drew opposition not only from members of that church, but also from Orthodox clerics such as Bishop Nicolae Popoviciu. On October 31, he reportedly took possession of the Blaj Cathedral while flanked by a column of Securitate troops. The church was formally dissolved on December 1. In spite of the aid he offered the regime, Bălan was purged from the Romanian Academy in June 1948.
