= List of botanical gardens in Ukraine =

Botanical gardens in Ukraine have collections consisting entirely of Ukraine native and endemic species; most have a collection that include plants from around the world. There are botanical gardens and arboreta in all the states and territories of Ukraine. Most are administered by local governments although some are privately owned.

- Chernivtsi National University Botanical Garden
- Dnipro Botanical Garden
- Dnipro State University Botanical Garden
- Dokuchaievsk Botaniсal Garden
- Donetsk Botanical Garden
- Podilsky State Agricultural and Technical University Botanical Garden, Kamenets-Podilskyi
- Kharkiv National Pedagogical University Botanic Garden
- Kharkiv National University Botanic Garden
- Kherson State University Agricultural and Biological Station and Botanical Garden
- Khorostkiv Botanical Garden
- Botanical Garden of the Мykola Kholodnyi Institute of Botany, Kyiv
- Botanical Garden of National University of Life and Environmental Sciences of Ukraine, Kyiv
- Hryshko National Botanical Garden, Kyiv
- O.V. Fomin Botanical Garden, Kyiv
- Kryvyi Rih Botanical Garden of National Academy of Sciences of Ukraine
- Kremenets Botanical Garden
- Botanic garden of Lviv National Medical University
- Lviv University Botanical Garden
- Ukrainian National Forestry University Botanical Garden, Lviv
- Botanic gardens of Taras Shevchenko Luhansk National University
- Lutsk Botanical Garden
- Carpathian Forest Research Station, Mukachevo
- Nizhyn Pedagogical Institute Botanical Garden
- Odesa Botanical Garden
- Poltava National Pedagogical University Botanical Garden
- Volodymyr Vernadskyi Tavrida National University Botanical Garden, Simferopol
- Dendropark of Technical College of Forestry, Storozhynets
- Botanical garden of Sumy State Pedagogical University
- Dendrological Park "Trostianets", Trostianets
- Sofiyivka Park, Uman
- Uzhhorod National University Botanical Garden
- Dendropark "Podillya", Vinnytsia
- Nikitsky Botanical Garden, Yalta, Crimea
- Children's Botanical Garden, Zaporizhzhia
- Zhytomyr Agricultural Institute Botanical Garden
