= Sesan =

Sesan or Sessan may refer to:

== Places ==
- Sesan District, Stung Treng Province, Cambodia
- Tonlé San, also known as the Sesan River, in Vietnam and Cambodia

== People ==
- Gbenga Sesan (born 1977), Nigerian entrepreneur
- Jorge Sesán, actor and director - see Pizza, Beer, and Cigarettes
- Valerian Șesan (1878–1940), Austro-Hungarian-born Romanian Orthodox theologian
- Sesan Adedeji (fl. 2019–2024), Nigerian Twenty20 International cricketer
- Sesan (video director), Sesan Ogunro (born 1983), Nigerian music video director based in the UK
- Sessan, her father's nickname for Louise of Sweden (1851–1926), queen consort of Denmark

== Other uses ==
- Seisan, also spelled Sesan, a kata in karate and other martial arts
- Sessan Line, a ferry company acquired by archrival Stena Line in 1981
- CK Sessan, the team that won the Swedish Women's Curling Championship in 1962
- Sessan Cup, a trophy for team racing in Nordic Folkboat sailing

== See also ==
- 34403 Sessin, an asteroid
