= Pribram (disambiguation) =

Příbram is a town in the Central Bohemian Region of the Czech Republic.

Pribram or Příbram may also refer to:

== Astronomy ==
- Příbram meteorite, which fell in 1959 east of Příbram, Czech Republic
- 9884 Příbram, a minor planet named for the meteorite

== Places in the Czech Republic ==
- Příbram District, a district in the Central Bohemian Region
- Příbram na Moravě a municipality and village in the South Moravian Region
- Uhelná Příbram, a market town in the Vysočina Region
- Příbram, a village and part of Verneřice in the Ústí nad Labem Region

== Sport ==
- FK Příbram, a Czech football club
- CK Příbram Fany Gastro, a UCI Continental cycling team based in the Czech Republic

== People with the surname ==
- Alfred Pribram (1841–1912), Bohemian internist
- Alfred Francis Pribram (1859–1942), British historian of Austrian origin
- Ernst August Pribram (1879-1940), Austrian pathologist and biochemist
- Karl Přibram (1877–1973), Austrian-born economist
- Karl H. Pribram (1919–2015), Austrian-born neurosurgeon and theorist of cognition
- Richard Pribram (1847–1928), Austrian chemist
