= Michael Radaković =

Austrian physicist

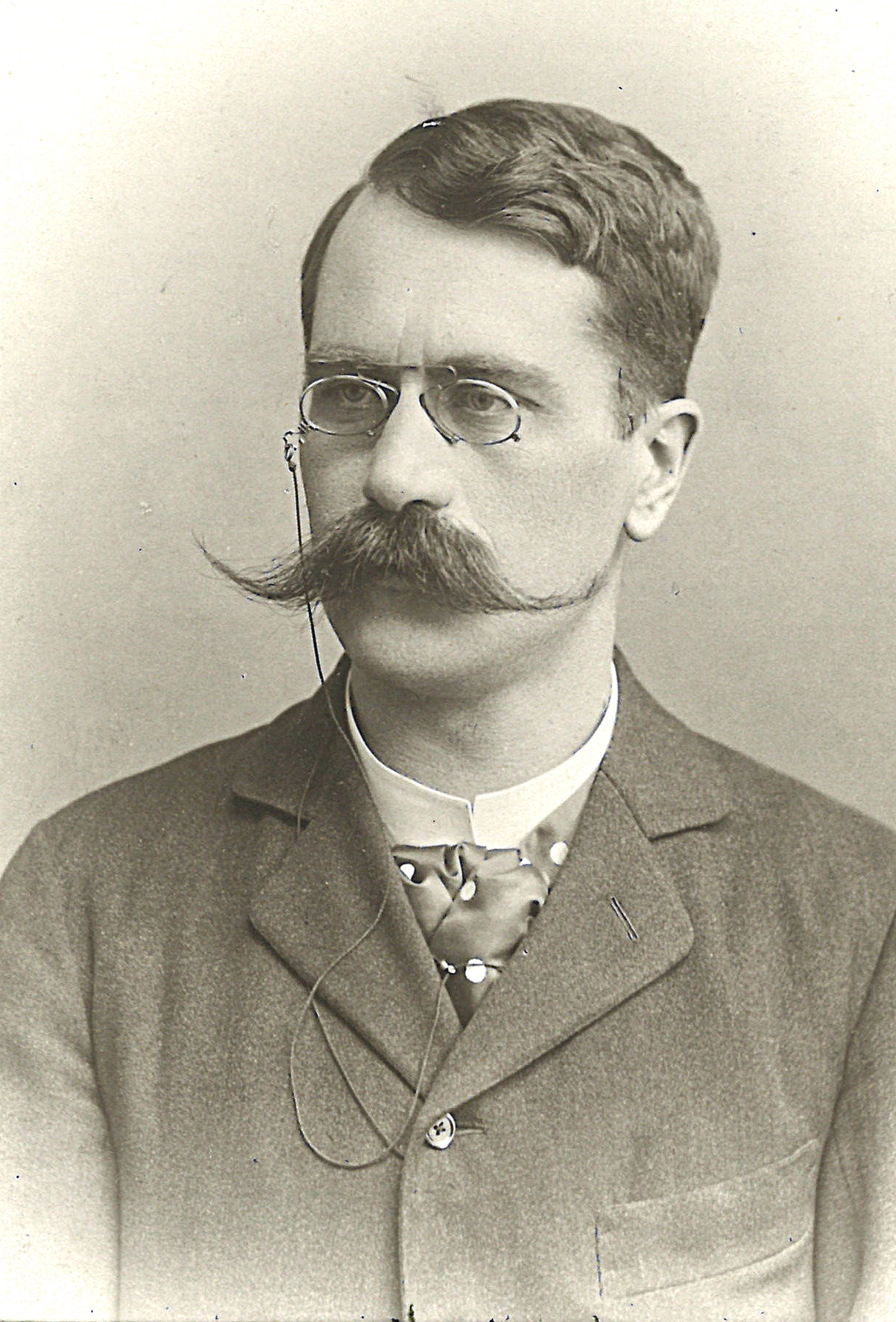
- Born: Michael Radaković; 25 April 1866; Graz, Austrian Empire
- Died: 18 August 1934 (aged 68); Graz, Austria

Academic work
- Discipline: Theoretical physics
- Institutions: University of Innsbruck; University of Czernowitz; University of Graz

Michael Radaković (25 April 1866 in Graz – 16 August 1934) was an Austrian physicist.

From 1884, he studied physics and mathematics at the University of Graz, where he was influenced by the philosophical teachings of Alexius Meinong (1853–1920). Following his studies at Graz, he continued his education in Berlin, where his instructors included Hermann von Helmholtz and Gustav Kirchhoff. He received his habilitation at the University of Innsbruck, where in 1902 he became an associate professor.

In 1906 he replaced Ottokar Tumlirz (1856–1927) as chair of theoretical physics at the University of Czernowitz. In 1915 he returned to Graz, where he succeeded Anton Wassmuth (1844–1927) as professor of theoretical physics. In 1924–25 he served as dean to the faculty of sciences. After his death, his position at Graz was filled by Erwin Schrödinger (1887–1961).

Radaković is remembered for his studies in the field of ballistics, being acclaimed for his experiments involving the muzzle velocity of a projectile.

== Published works ==
- Über die Bedingungen für die Möglichkeit physikalischer Vorgänge. Popular lectures at the University of Czernowitz; (1913) - On the conditions for the possibility of physical processes.
