= Constantin Tomaszczuk =

Romanian jurist, professor and politician (1840–1889)

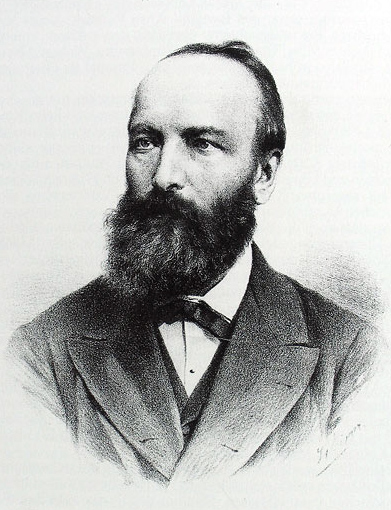

Member of the Abgeordnetenhaus
- In office 1871–1889

Member of the Diet of Bukovina
- In office 1871–1874
- In office 1878–1889

Personal details
- Born: 13 March 1840 Czernowitz (Cernăuți), Austrian Empire
- Died: 19 December 1889 (aged 49) Vienna, Cisleithania, Austria-Hungary
- Citizenship: Austria-Hungary
- Party: Constitutional; United Left
- Education: University of Lemberg
- Occupation: Jurist, professor, politician
- Known for: First rector of the University of Chernivtsi

Constantin Tomaszczuk (in Romanian Constantin Tomașciuc; born March 13, 1840 – died December 19, 1889 (aged 49)) was a Romanian jurist, professor of law and legal philosophy, and politician in Austria-Hungary. He served as a deputy in the Diet of Bukovina and in the House of Deputies of the Imperial Council in Vienna from 1871 to 1889. He was the first rector of the University of Czernowitz.

== Early life and career ==
Constantin Tomaszczuk was born in Czernowitz (now Chernivtsi) on 13 March 1840 into a Greek Orthodox family. His mother was Romanian, and his father was Ruthenian (Ukrainian).

=== Education ===
After primary school, he graduated from the Obergymnasium in Chernivtsi on 31 July 1857. That same year, he enrolled at the University of Lemberg (now Lviv), where he studied law, philosophy, and history. In 1861, he graduated from the Faculty of Law, and on 16 August 1864 he obtained his Doctor of Law degree.

He worked for five years as a jurist in Sibiu.

== Political career ==
Tomaszczuk served as a deputy in the Diet of Bukovina and in the Imperial Council (Reichsrat) in Vienna between 1871 and 1889.

He was affiliated with the liberal and centralist group led by Eudoxiu Hurmuzachi, which advocated for a politically centralized state with cultural autonomy for crown lands inhabited by non-German ethnic groups. This contrasted with the federalist-autonomist faction led by Alexandru Petrino, which favored a decentralized and federal structure.

Tomaszczuk considered himself ethnically Romanian, politically Austrian, and partly of Ruthenian origin. He believed that Austrian political nationality should not be based on language or ethnicity, and he strongly opposed German ultranationalism and antisemitism. He was a member of the Society for Romanian Culture and Literature in Bukovina.

On 7 March 1872, during a debate in the Imperial Council, he advocated for the establishment of a university in Chernivtsi and for the development of secondary education for women in the Duchy of Bukovina. These initiatives were eventually realized, and in 1875, as a professor of commercial law and legal philosophy, he was appointed the first rector of the University of Chernivtsi.

In 1888 he joined the United German Left parliamentary group.

== Academic career ==
Tomaszczuk was the first rector of the Franz Joseph University of Czernowitz. He taught civil law, commercial and negotiable instruments law, and philosophy of law.

== Illness and death ==
In 1888, Tomaszczuk was diagnosed with lung cancer. He was scheduled for surgery in Vienna at the end of 1889 but died just days before the operation. He was buried with honors at the Vienna Central Cemetery. In the Austrian Parliament, he was succeeded by Doxuță Hurmuzachi.

== Legacy ==
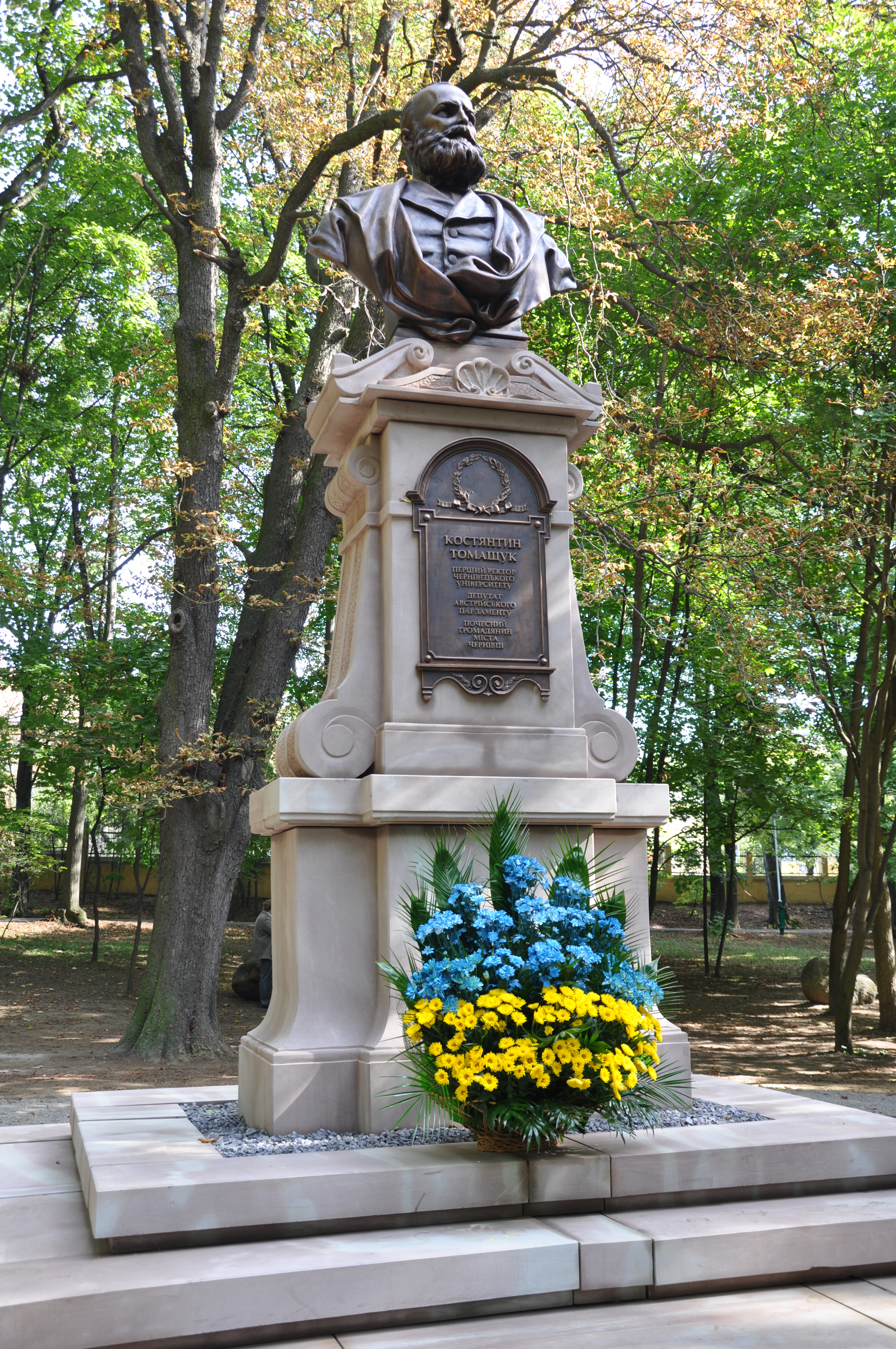
Statue of Tomaszczuk in Chernivtsi

A statue of Constantin Tomaszczuk stands in Chernivtsi, and a memorial plaque in his honor is located on Pelikangasse in Vienna.

In modern-day Ukraine, Tomaszczuk is regarded as "Ukrainian". However, during his lifetime, Tomaszczuk self-identified as Romanian.

== See also ==
- University of Chernivtsi
- Duchy of Bukovina
- Romanians of Chernivtsi Oblast
