= Austrium =

Proposed chemical element

Austrium is the name of a new chemical element proposed by Eduard Linnemann in 1886. As a chemist at the German University in Prague he experimented with the mineral orthite (from Arendal in Norway). In the course of his works over several years he detected spectral lines at 4165 and 4030 Angstrom, respectively, which he was not able to ascribe to any then known element. These findings were published only after his death after due consideration on May 6, 1886, by the Academy of Sciences of Prague.

Subsequently, the French chemist Paul Emile Lecoq de Boisbaudran pointed out that Linnemann's findings could also be attributed to gallium, an element which had been described by Lecoq himself in 1875. Finally, Richard Pribram from the University of Czernowitz set out to settle the question. He was able to conclude that Linnemann's austrium did not constitute a new element but was – as already presumed by Lecoq – nothing but gallium. At the same time Pribram himself surmised that he might have found unidentified spectral lines of yet another new element, for which he as a homage to Linnemann again proposed the name austrium. But also these claims could not be substantiated in further investigations.
