= Sloboda, Chernivtsi Oblast =

Village in Chernivtsi Oblast, Ukraine

Coordinates: 48°16′34″N 26°12′03″E

Sloboda (Ukrainian: Слобода; Romanian: Slobozia Rarancei; German: Rarancze Slobodzia) is a village in Chernivtsi Raion, Chernivtsi Oblast, Ukraine. It belongs to Novoselytsia urban hromada, one of the hromadas of Ukraine.

Until 18 July 2020, Sloboda belonged to Novoselytsia Raion. The raion was abolished in July 2020 as part of the administrative reform of Ukraine, which reduced the number of raions of Chernivtsi Oblast to three. The area of Novoselytsia Raion was split between Chernivtsi and Dniester Raions, with Sloboda being transferred to Chernivtsi Raion.

== Notable people ==
- Valerian Șesan (1878–1940), theologian
