= Serhii Rudyk =

Ukrainian politician

- Сергій Рудик
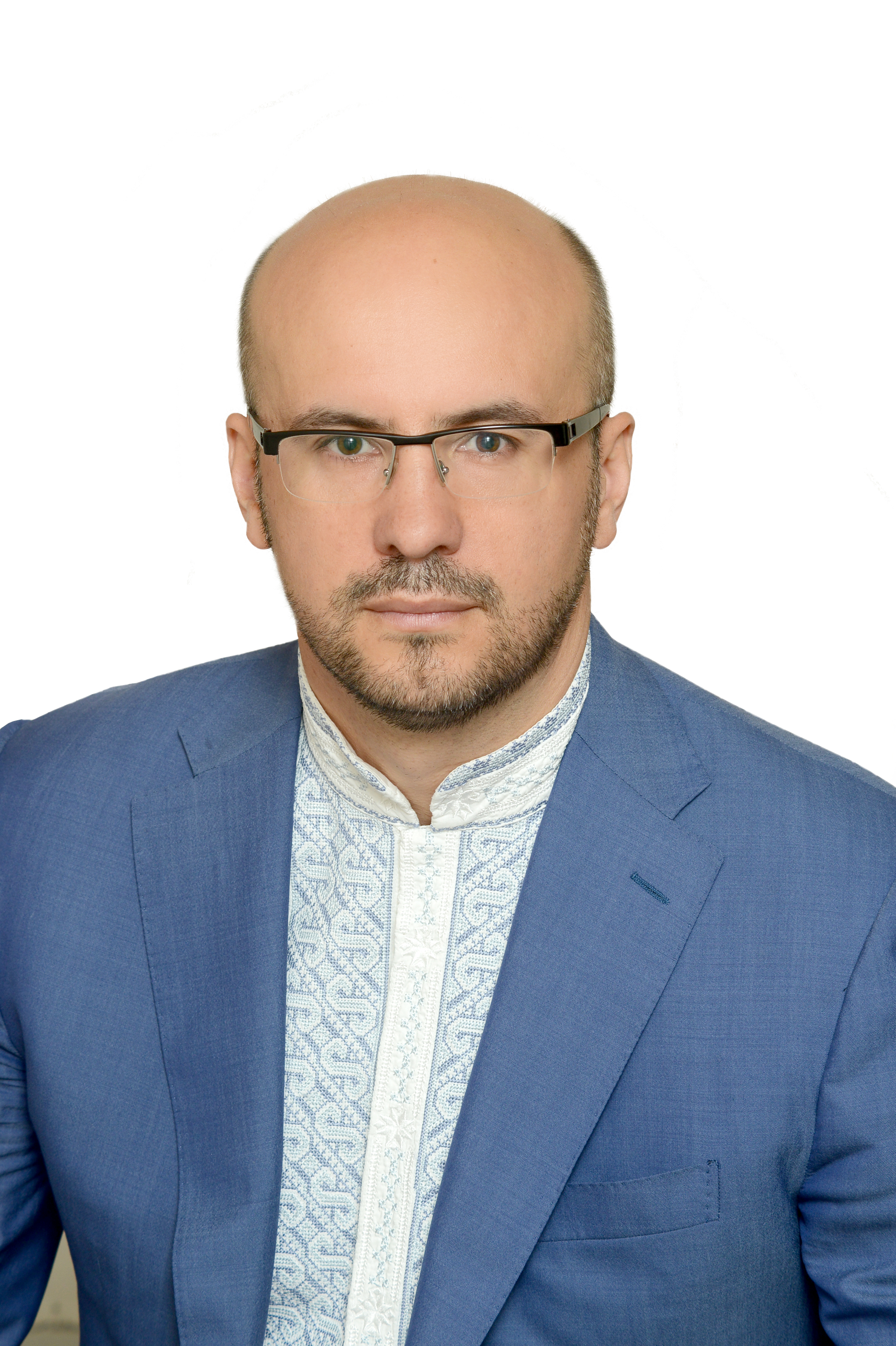

People's Deputy of Ukraine
- Incumbent
- Assumed office 27 November 2014
- Preceded by: Viktor Tymoshenko
- Constituency: Cherkasy Oblast, No. 198

Personal details
- Born: 11 October 1970 (age 55) Chernivtsi, Ukrainian SSR, Soviet Union (now Ukraine)
- Party: ZM (since 2019)
- Other political affiliations: Independent; Svoboda (2014–2015); PPB (2016–2019)
- Education: Chernivtsi University; National Academy for Public Administration; University of North London

Serhii Yaroslavovych Rudyk (Ukrainian: Сергі́й Яросла́вович Ру́дик; born 11 October 1970) is a Ukrainian politician currently serving as a People's Deputy of Ukraine since 27 November 2014.

== Education ==
Yuriy Fedkovych Chernivtsi National University, Historic Faculty (1992), "The World History"; the National Academy for Public Administration (2001), Master of Business Administration; the University of North London (2001), "Public Administration"; thesis of the PhD "Emigration of Ukrainian refugees and people's moving to the United States and Canada after the Second World War: reasons, peculiarities, results (1945—1953)».

== Career ==
- August — November 1992 — a teacher at Vyzhnytsi boarding school of Chernivtsi області.
- November 1992 — October 1995 — a post-graduate student of Yuriy Fedkovych Chernivtsi National University.
- 1993–1994 — a journalist of all Ukrainian newspaper «Chas».
- November 1995 — June 1996 — a teacher of Chernivtsi mechanic-technological college.
- June — September 1996 — the head of the department of organizational supplying of coming back of the departed — an associate of the head of administration on the departed affairs,
- July — September 1996 — the head of administration on the departed affairs of the Ministry of nationalities and migration affairs.
- September 1996 — August 1999 — the head of the administration on the departed affairs in the State Committee of Ukraine on nationalities and migration affairs.
- September 1999 – February 2001 – a listener of the National Academy for Public Administration under the President of Ukraine.
- The head of Chernivtsi Region Association of young Ukrainian political science specialists and politicians (since March 1996), the head of the Council of the Youth Organizations in Chernivtsi Region (since March 1996).
- The head of the on-looking council "The Fund of Regional Initiatives" (since March 2001).
- The President of Statesmen Association (since May 2005).
- The coordinator of the public organizations of Ukraine coalition "Freedom of choice".
- The member of Council of All Ukraine Public Monitoring (2001–2002).
- The chief editor of all Ukraine law newspaper "Gromadianskyi zahysnyk" (2003–2005).
- Deputy of the Kyiv City Council (April 2006 – May 2008), the head of the constant committee on local self-management, regional and international tights affairs (since July 2006).
- The head of political committee of Kyiv city organization Public Party "PORA" (з 2007).
- 24 October 2005 – 10 January 2007 – the head of the State Committee on nationalities and migration affairs.
- March 2007 – March 2010 – an associate of the head of Kyiv City State Administration.
- The Head advisor in the Ternopil Oblast Council.
- A doctorate student in the National Academy of State Administration of the President of Ukraine, the topic of the doctorate thesis is "The mechanisms of the state management of outer migration concerning the interests of public development: formation and necessity of introduction» (November 2011 — January 2013).

In the 2012 Ukrainian parliamentary election Rudyk as a candidate of Svoboda failed in district 198 of Cherkasy region to win a parliamentary seats, he finished second with 20.52% of the votes.

- The head of secretariat of the deputy faction "Svoboda" in the Verhovna Rada of Ukraine (January 2013 – April 2014).
- In April 2014, he was appointed the Head of the State Agency of soil resources of Ukraine. He was fired from the post on November 26, 2014, having been elected the People's Deputy of Ukraine.
- On 2 December 2014, he swore an oath of a People's Deputy of Ukraine. Entered the Rada as a self-nominated candidate of district 198 of Cherkasy region elected in the 2014 Ukrainian parliamentary election with 21.72% of the votes. The head of the subcommittee on the questions of the State's dept and state's budget financing of the Committee of the Verkhovna Rada of Ukraine on budget issues.

In the 2019 Ukrainian parliamentary election Rudyk, as a non-partisan candidate, was reelected in district 198 with 28.92% of the votes.

== Parliamentary Activity ==
- At interim elections of people's deputies in Ukraine on 26 October 2014 was elected in single mandate district No. 198, Cherkasy region as a self-nominated candidate. The member of deputy faction "Petro Poroshenko Bloc "Solidarity"". The head of subcommittee on the state's budget financing of the Committee of the Verkhovna Rada on issues of budget.

== Achievements ==
He is the author and co-author of more than 20 scientific works on the questions of state management, public society development and migration problems, in particular:

- «Statesmen’s ethics of behaviour during elections»,
- «Bodies of population’s self-organization. Modern tendencies. The basis of foundation, problems of functioning and development»,
- «The union of block of flats owners as a body of public society».

== Orders ==
- Order of Merit (Ukraine), the III rd class (October 2009)
- The Order of Crist the Defender (August 2014)
- "Symon Petliura Cross»
