= Eduard Linnemann =

German chemist (1841–1886)

- Born: February 2, 1841; Frankfurt am Main, Germany
- Died: April 24, 1886 (aged 45); Prague, Austria-Hungary
- Awards: Lieben Prize (1868, 1874)

Eduard Linnemann (2 February 1841 – 4 April 1886) was a German chemist.

He studied chemistry at the University of Heidelberg and at the University of Karlsruhe. After he received his Ph.D. he worked with Kekulé at the University of Ghent and with Leopold von Pebal at the University of Lemberg. He was appointed professor at the University of Lemberg in 1865, changed to Deutsche Technische Hochschule Brünn from 1872 until 1875 and then became professor at the Charles University in Prague. He held this position until his death in 1886.

He is known for his investigations of mannitol and his analyses of zircon. In 1886, he proposed the name "austrium" for what he believed was a new chemical element.

== Publications ==
- Über das Unvermögen des Propylens sich mit Wasser zu verbinden, 1877 - On the inability of propylene to combine with water.
- Über die Absorptionserscheinungen in Zirkonen, 1885 - On the absorption phenomena of zircon.
- Das Oxydationsproduct des Propylenoxydes durch Silberoxyd, 1885 - The oxidation product of propylene oxides by silver.
- Verarbeitung und qualitative Zusammensetzung des Zirkons, 1885 - Processing and qualitative composition of zircon.
- Austrium, ein neues metallisches Element, 1886 - Austrium, a new metallic element.
