= Konstantin Chervinskiy =

Ukrainian chemist

Konstantin Oleksandrovich Chervinskiy (Ukrainian: Костянтин Олександрович Червінський; May 19, 1919 – August 21, 2002) was a Ukrainian chemist.

Born in Pikiv, Kalynivka Raion, Vinnytsia Oblast, he entered university in 1937 but interrupted his education due to World War II. He participated in the Second Jassy–Kishinev Offensive and was approved for the Hero of the Soviet Union award, but never granted it. After the war, he received a degree from the Kharkiv Polytechnic Institute and taught at the Ukrainian State Chemical-Technological University in Dnipropetrovsk. From 1968 to 1987, he was rector of Chernivtsi University, where he both supervised the building and opening of new laboratories, faculties and a scientific library, and led a restoration of the university's signature building, the former Residence of Bukovinian and Dalmatian Metropolitans. The author of 270 articles, two monographs, one textbook and sixteen inventions, he was a corresponding member of the National Academy of Sciences of Ukraine.
