= Alois Handl =

Austrian physicist

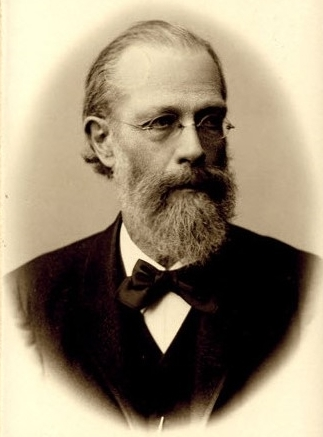

Alois Handl (22 July 1837, Feldkirch, Vorarlberg – 1915, Czernowitz) was an Austrian physicist.

In 1859 he obtained his doctorate in Vienna, later becoming a professor at the University of Lemberg. Afterwards he taught classes at the military academy in Wiener Neustadt. In 1876 he established the chair of experimental physics at the University of Czernowitz, a position he maintained until his retirement in 1906. Following his retirement, Handl was succeeded at Czernowitz by Josef Geitler von Armingen (1870-1923).

As a physicist he conducted studies in the fields of crystallography, barometry, hydrodensitometry, and also did research involving light absorption, the specific resistance of liquids, and color vision in animals, to name a few. With chemist Richard Pribram (1847-1928), he conducted investigations on the viscosity of different organic compounds, with results of their work being published in the Sitzungsberichte of the Austrian Academy of Sciences and in Wilhelm Ostwald’s Zeitschrift für Physikalische Chemie. Handl's textbook of physics for middle-school students, "Lehrbuch der Physik für die oberen Classen der Mittelschulen", was published over several editions.
