= Josef Geitler von Armingen =

Austrian physicist (1870–1923)

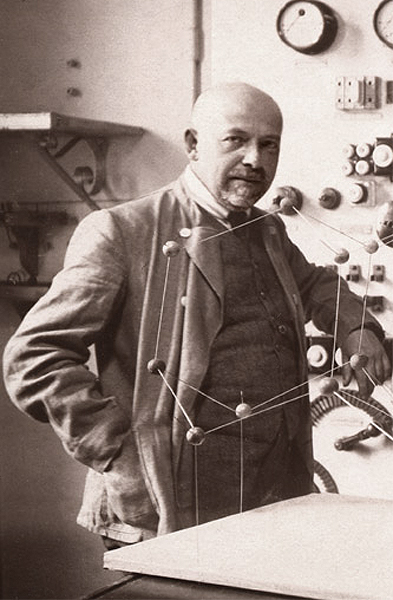
Joseph Geitler (1912 photo)

Josef Karl Franz Otto Geitler, Ritter von Armingen (14 September 1870 – 20 June 1923) was an Austrian physicist born in Smíchov, today a district in Prague. He is remembered for his investigations of electromagnetic waves.

He studied in Prague and Bonn, later obtaining his habilitation at Prague. Meanwhile in 1906 he succeeded Alois Handl (1837-1915) as chair of experimental physics at the University of Czernowitz. In 1919, when Czernowitz became a Romanian university, Geitler relocated to Graz, where he taught classes at the Technische Universität Graz.

Among his scientific research were studies that explained differences between x-rays and cathode rays. His best known publication was Elektromagnetische Schwingungen und Wellen, ("Electromagnetic oscillations and waves") (1905).

He was a cousin to physicist Heinrich Hertz (1857-1894). Among his students at Czernowitz was Wojciech Rubinowicz (1889-1974).
