= Anton Wassmuth =

Austrian physicist (1844–1927)

Anton Wassmuth (5 May 1844, Stift Tepl near Marienbad – 22 April 1927, Graz) was an Austrian physicist.

He studied mathematics, philosophy and natural sciences at the University of Prague, where he subsequently became an assistant to Ernst Mach (1838-1916). In 1871 he obtained his habilitation on electricity and magnetism from the University of Vienna. In 1876 became an associate professor at the recently established University of Czernowitz, where in 1882 he was appointed a full professor of theoretical physics. In 1890 he relocated to Innsbruck as a professor and director at the institute of mathematical physics. Here he served as dean to the faculty in 1891. From 1893 to 1914 he served as chair of theoretical physics at the University of Graz. Following retirement, his position at Graz was filled by Michael Radaković (1866-1934).

Wassmuth is best known for his research involving thermoelasticity, electromagnetism and statistical mechanics. Among his principal written works are: Die Elektrizität und ihre Anwendungen (Electricity and its applications, 1885) and Grundlagen und Anwendungen der statistischen Mechanik (Fundamentals and applications of statistical mechanics, 1915).

In 1885 he became a member of the "Deutsche Akademie der Naturforscher Leopoldina".
