= Vasyl Filipchuk =

Ukrainian diplomat and politician

Vasyl Filipchuk Василь Філіпчук
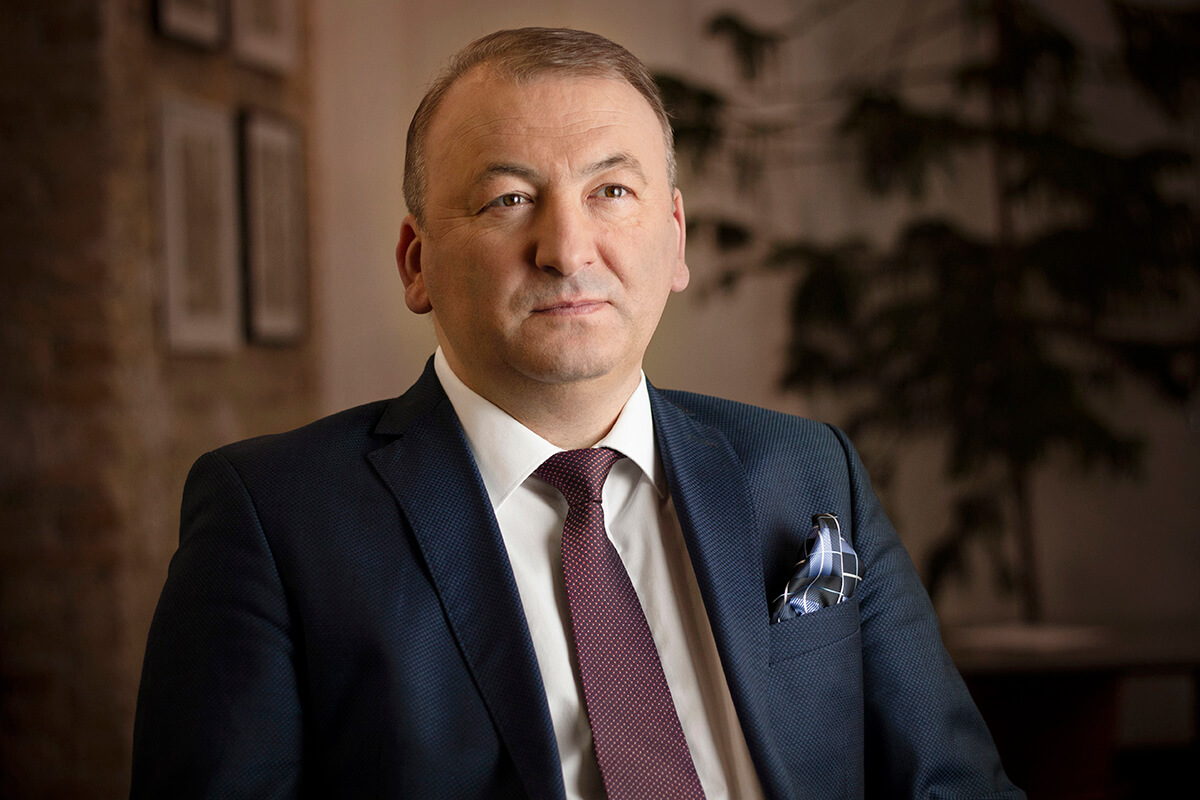
- Born: October 22, 1971 (age 54); Kyseliv, Chernivtsi Oblast, Ukraine
- Education: Chernivtsi National University

Vasyl Filipchuk (Ukrainian: Василь Філіпчук; born October 22, 1971, in the village of Kyseliv, Chernivtsi Oblast, Ukraine) is a Ukrainian diplomat, politician, Ministry of Foreign Affairs of Ukraine Spokesperson (2005–2006) and Director of the Department for European Integration of the Secretariat of Cabinet of Ministers (2012–2013).

Since 2014, Vasyl Filipchuk has served as a senior advisor of the International Centre for Policy Studies (ICPS), one of Ukraine's leading think tanks. He also founded an online media outlet called Apostrophe (2014) and Apostrophe TV channel (2020).

Mr. Filipchuk has a Ph.D. in Public Administration from the National Academy for Public Administration under the President of Ukraine.

Diplomatic rank: Envoy Extraordinary and Plenipotentiary, Second Class; Mr. Filipchuk also has the third civil servant rank.

== Biography ==
Filipchuk was born on October 22, 1971, to a family of builders. As a student at Chernivtsi National University (1988–1993), in 1989 he edited «Smoloskyp», a publication of the Ukrainian Youth Association of Bukovina, one of the first independent magazines in Ukraine. In the university he obtained his qualification as a history teacher.

After graduating from the Chernivtsi National University in 1993, Filipchuk worked a history and German language teacher at a local high school in Dovhopillya, Chernivtsi Oblast. In 1994, he worked as a journalist at local and national media outlets. In 1995, Filipchuk became deputy head of the Department of Youth and Sports at the Chernivtsi Regional State Administration. Throughout 1995–1997, he served as an aide to one of Ukraine's MPs (Committee on Foreign Affairs at the Verkhovna Rada of Ukraine). In 1996–1997 he studied at the National Academy for Public Administration under the President of Ukraine. There, Filipchuk obtained his master's degree in Public Administration.

Filipchuk later held various diplomatic positions, engaged in public activities, and organized several projects in the field of media.

== Diplomatic career ==
Filipchuk began his diplomatic career at the Ministry of Foreign Affairs of Ukraine. From 1997 to 1999, he worked as the First Secretary of the Department for Euro-Atlantic Integration. He also headed the European Union Department of the Ministry of Foreign Affairs. At that time, he was an author of the draft Strategy for Ukraine's Integration into the EU, which was approved by a presidential decree on June 11, 1998.

From 1999 to 2003, Filipchuk served as First Secretary, Adviser to the Delegation of Ukraine to the European Union. From 2003 to 2004, in turn, he was Chief Adviser of the Department for Political Analysis and Planning at the Ministry of Foreign Affairs. From 2004 to 2005, he worked as deputy director of the Political Department at the Ministry of Foreign Affairs of Ukraine. In 2005–2006, Filipchuk headed the press service of the Ministry of Foreign Affairs and served as a spokesperson for the Ministry. From 2006 to 2010, he was Deputy Head of Ukraine's Delegation to the European Union. Then, in 2010–2011, he served as Director of the department for the European Union at the Ministry of Foreign Affairs. From 2011 to 2012, he headed the Political Department of the Ministry. In May 2012, Filipchuk started working at the Cabinet of Ministers. There, he headed the Department of European Integration at the Secretariat of the Cabinet.

In 2012—2014 he studied as a postgraduate student at the National Academy for Public Administration under the President of Ukraine (Department of European Integration). In 2014, he defended his dissertation on European integration as a tool for nation-building in Ukraine, obtaining his Ph.D. in Public Administration.

== Public activities ==
Since 2014, Filipchuk has served as a senior advisor of the International Centre for Policy Studies (ICPS), one of Ukraine's leading think tanks. Under his leadership, the ICPS organized dozens of conferences, round tables, and other events, focusing on the issues of international security, European integration, as well as domestic and foreign affairs. In 2020, he joined the July 16 Initiative, which aims to promote an inclusive nationwide dialogue on determining Ukraine's future.

Filipchuk has also partaken in the meetings of the Euro-Atlantic Security Leadership Group (EASLG), which focuses on developing proposals for improving security in the Euro-Atlantic region.

== Media projects ==
In 2014 Filipchuk created an independent online media platform Apostrophe that started its work in August 2014. The website is owned by the European Media Group LLC, founded by Filipchuk. In 2016 Filipchuk supported an online media platform Realist, that is part of Glas-Media LLC, founded by Filipchuk. Filipchuk expanded the audience through video production by starting an "Apostrophe TV" channel, that began satellite broadcasting on June 1, 2020. Filipchuk owns a 40% stake in Apostrophe TV LLC.

== Awards and honors ==
Vasyl Filipchuk was awarded Verkhovna Rada's Certificate of Honor.

== Publications ==
Vasyl Filipchuk is an author of many research papers, documents and articles on foreign policy and European integration. He wrote a project called «Strategies for Ukraine’s European Integration», which was adopted by the President's decree on June 11, 1998.
