= Valerian Șesan =

Austro-Hungarian-born Romanian theologian (1878–1940)

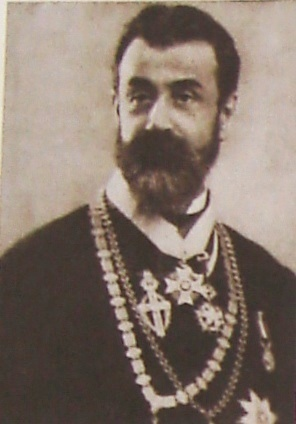
Valerian Șesan

Valerian Șesan (June 28, 1878–May 10, 1940) was an Austro-Hungarian-born Romanian theologian.

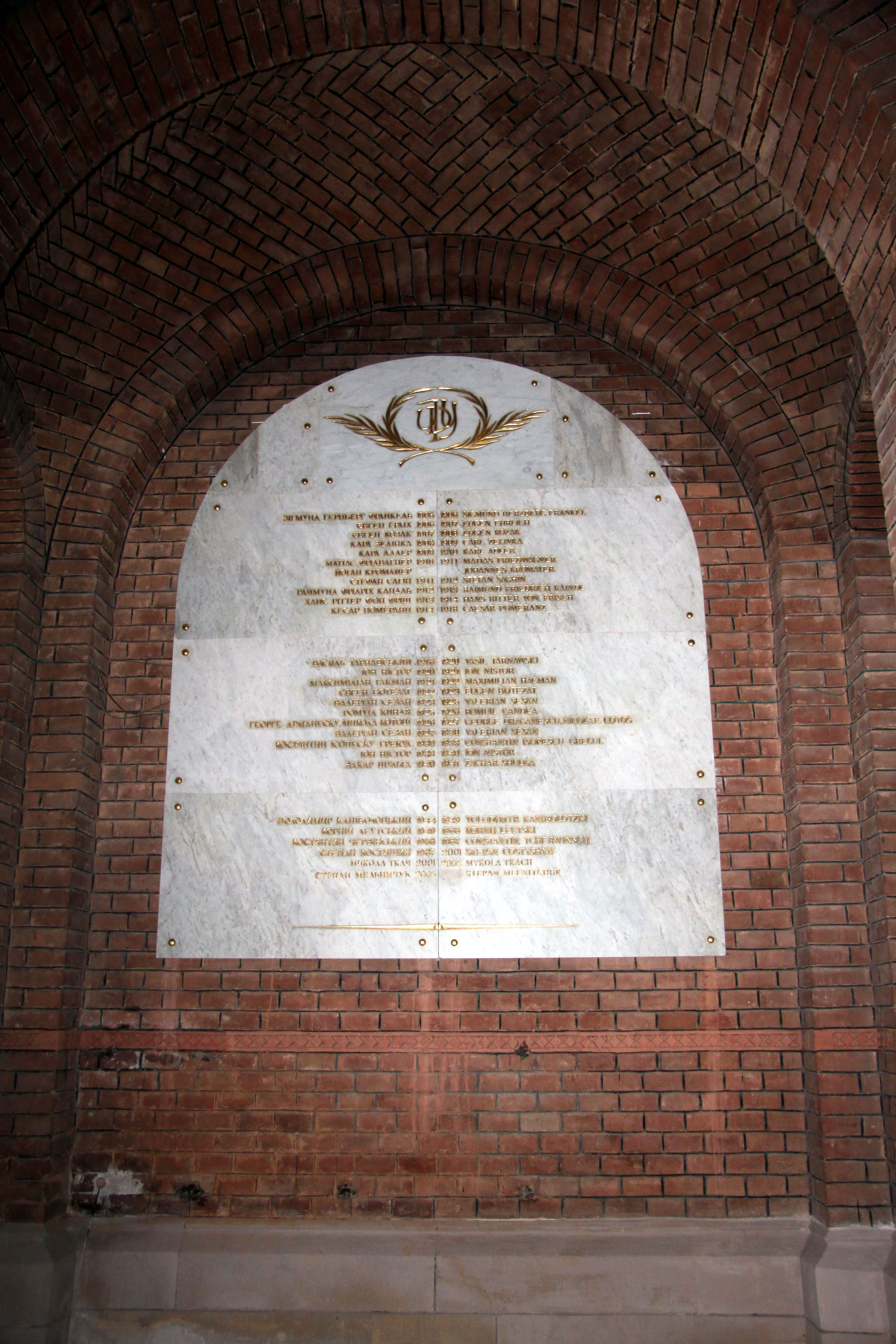
Plaque dedicated to the rectors of the University of Chernivtsi, also mentioning Valerian Șesan

Born in Slobozia Rarancei, in Austrian-ruled Bukovina, his father was a Romanian Orthodox priest. From 1888 to 1896, he attended the Romanian gymnasium in Czernowitz (Cernăuți), followed by the theology faculty of Czernowitz University from 1896 to 1900. After receiving a doctorate from that institution in 1901, he studied at the law faculties of Czernowitz, Vienna and Prague, obtaining a law doctorate at Prague in 1916. Meanwhile, in 1906-1907, he took specialty courses at Athens University and in Jerusalem. Then, from 1907 to 1908, he studied at the theological academies of Kiev, Moscow and Saint Petersburg. From 1909 to 1918, he served as a deacon at Czernowitz Cathedral. In 1918, the year Bukovina was integrated into Greater Romania, Șesan was ordained a priest; in 1920, he was made an archpriest. From 1911 to 1939, he served as Czech translator for the local appeals court.

Șesan joined the Czernowitz University faculty in 1913 as a teaching assistant in church law at the theology faculty. He became a substitute professor in 1918 and was full professor from 1919 until his death. He was faculty dean for 1921-1922 and university rector from 1923 to 1925 and from 1927 to 1930. Additionally, he was on the law faculty. Within the church, he sat on the higher-level consistory (1919-1925); played an important role in organizing the church hierarchy in the enlarged Romanian state; was economic adviser to his bishop (1925-1931), a member of the national church congress, delegate to an ecclesiastical congress held at Prague in 1928; and, from 1936 to 1940, presided over the Bukovina Orthodox clergy association. From 1922 to 1925, he directed the government's religious affairs department for Bukovina. He founded the Friends of Czechoslovakia Cultural Association at Cernăuți and belonged to the Bukovina society for Romanian culture and literature.

Șesan published a number of works on canon law, of interest both to Orthodox in general and to the Romanian church in particular. He wrote a textbook published posthumously and drafted legislative proposals for unifying church administration after 1918. He was an opponent of allowing the laity to exercise power within the church. His studies, articles, reviews and speeches appeared in Candela and Glasul Bucovinei at Cernăuți and in Cuvântul Preoțesc at Rădăuți.
