= Teodor Tarnavschi =

Romanian Orthodox priest and professor (1859–1914)

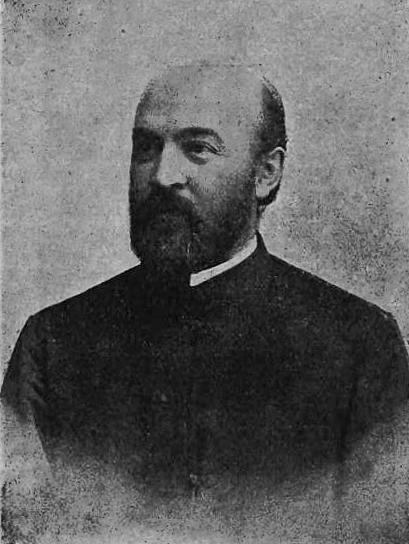
Teodor Tarnavschi

Teodor Tarnavschi (August 16, 1859 – January 14 [O.S. January 1] 1914) was an ethnic Romanian Orthodox priest and theology professor in the Duchy of Bukovina, in Austria-Hungary.

Born in Vijnița, he attended the higher gymnasium in Cernăuți from 1870 to 1878, followed by the theology faculty of Czernowitz University from 1878 to 1882. From 1882 to 1883, he undertook specialized studies at the University of Vienna and the Ludwig-Maximilians-Universität München. He took a doctorate in theology from Czernowitz in 1885. From 1884 to 1886, he was prefect of studies at the clerical seminary in Cernăuți. From 1886 to 1892, he was parish priest at the city's churches of St. Nicholas and St. Paraskevi. Within the department of practical theology at Czernowitz, he was substitute professor in 1891, associate professor in 1893 and full professor in 1896. He was dean four times, from 1898 to 1899, from 1900 to 1901, from 1902 to 1903, and from 1910 to 1911. He was university rector from 1904 to 1905. He was archpriest from 1897, cross-bearing priest from 1904 and school inspector for the Bukovina Diocese. In 1906, he joined the Defenders Party of Bukovina, and in 1908 the leadership of the Romanian Christian Social Party of Bukovina. He was a deputy in the Diet of Bukovina. His articles and sermons appeared in Candela. He died in Cernăuți.

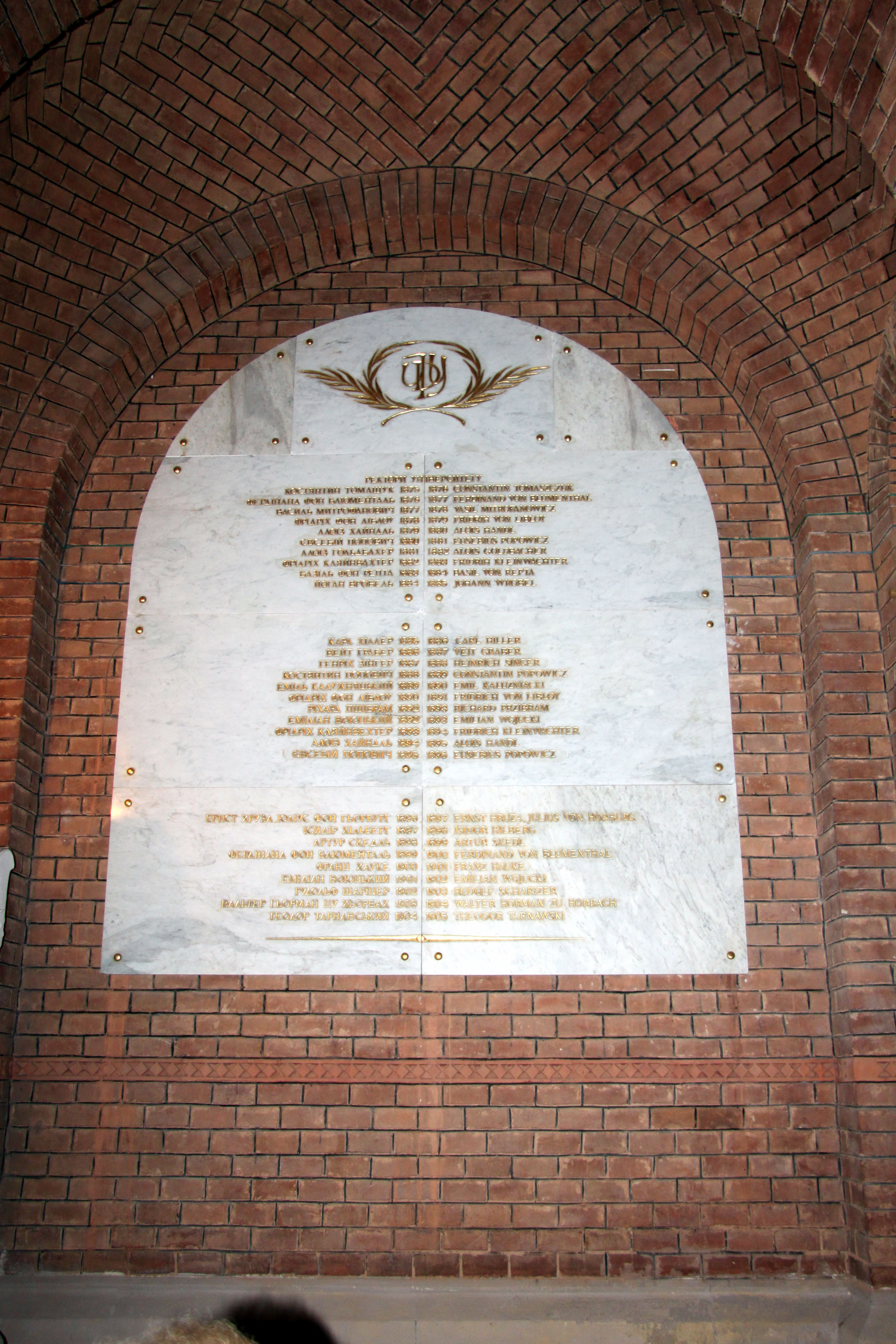
Plaque dedicated to the rectors of the University of Chernivtsi, also mentioning Teodor Tarnavschi (as Theodor Tarnawski)
