= Doxuță Hurmuzachi =

Austrian Empire-born Romanian jurist and politician

Eudoxiu "Doxuță" Hurmuzachi (June 18, 1845–June 10, 1931) was an Austrian Empire-born Romanian jurist and politician.

Born in Cernăuți, the son of Gheorghe Hurmuzachi, he began secondary school in his native city, finishing at Brussels in 1864. He then studied law at the University of Vienna, graduating in 1868. A civil servant in the provincial administration of the Duchy of Bukovina, he served as district captain at Suceava and Cernăuți until 1891. While in the former city, he proposed restoration of the Mirăuți Church, which the Austrian government accepted after multiple requests from bishop Silvestru Morariu Andrievici. A member of the Romanian National Party, he served in the Diet of Bukovina from 1883 to 1891, and was also elected to the House of Deputies in 1891. He helped found Romanian cultural institutions, and from 1887 to 1897 was president of the Society for Romanian Literature and Culture in Bukovina. In 1904, he headed the organizing committee commemorating 400 years since the death of Stephen the Great. He died in Cernăuți.
