= Sessan Cup =

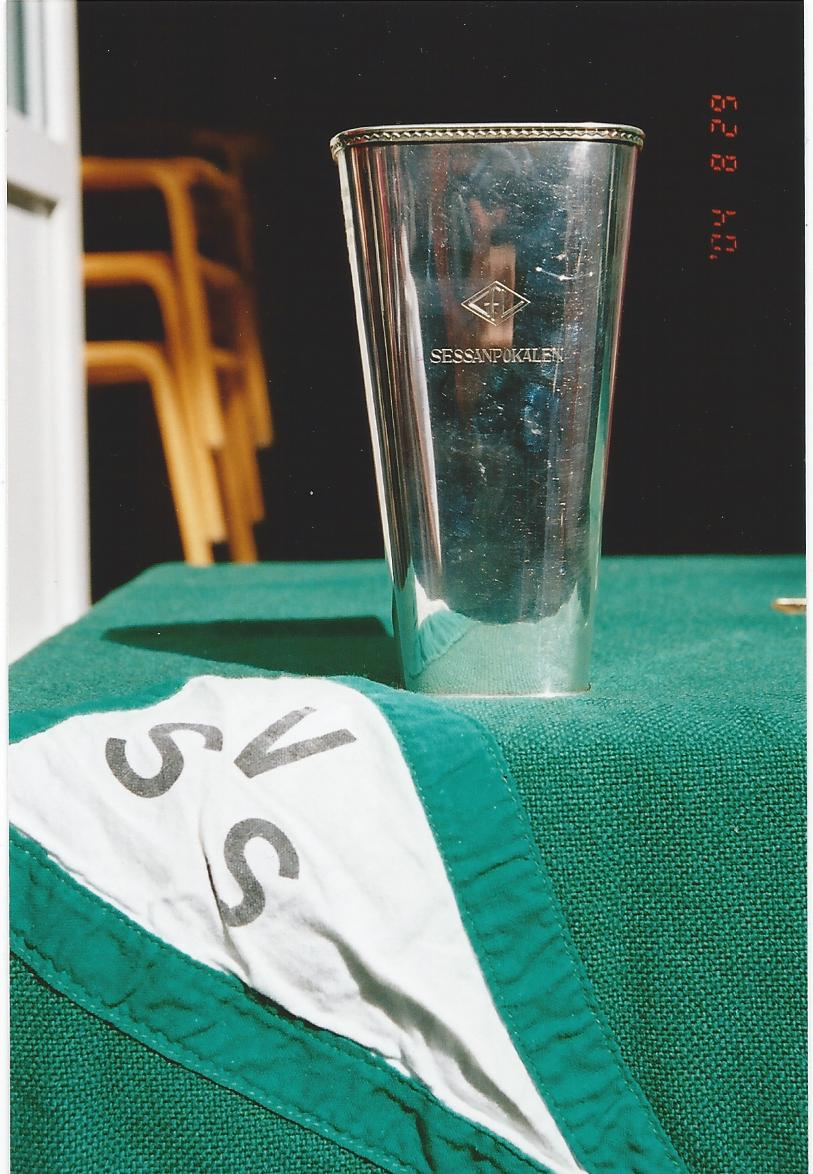
Picture of the Sessan trophy from 2004. The event was organised by the "Vikingarnas Segelsällskap" in Stockholm, Sweden

The Sessan Cup or in Swedish "Sessanpokalen" is a trophy of a team race in Nordic Folkboat sailing.

== Background ==
The teams, in the Sessan Cup, consist of two boats in each team competing in an overall fleet race. In the beginning, there were prices for both to the team and also an individual fleet race price. The individual part is now omitted. This is an international race and races have been held in, among others, cities like Berlin, Helsinki, Kerteminde, and Stockholm.

The origin was the "Gothenburg international regatta", which was sailed in Gothenburg, Sweden, the first time 13 September 1952. The first winners were the team "Göteborgs Folkbåtsklubb" and individually the well known Swedish boat designer Olle Enderlein from the city of Norrköping, Sweden.

In 1957, the shipowner Ulf Trapp from Gotheburg did set up the "Sessanpokalen". The name derives from the Ulf Trapp's ferry line, the Sessan line between Sweden and Denmark. All the ferries were named after princesses and in popular speech, the line became the "Sessan line" ("Sessan" in Swedish is short for "the Princess"). Later the name was adopted as the formal name for the ferry line.

Ulf Trapp was the third generation shipowner and the family originated from Hannover in Germany. He was also a keen sailor and had three Nordic Folkboats. The most successful was F-SWE-448 "Atout" ("Atout" means asset or trump in French) built by John Josefsson&Son Båtvarv, Kungsviken 1957.

The "Sessanpokalen" is now administrated by the Nordic Folkboat International Association (NFIA).

The latest event was held in Berlin, 2014.
