= Electronic Medical Records and Genomics Network =

American medical genomics consortium

The Electronic Medical Records and Genomics Network (abbreviated the eMERGE Network) is a consortium of American medical institutions dedicated to advancing the use of electronic medical records for genomics research. It was established in 2007 and is funded by the National Human Genome Research Institute (NHGRI). eMERGE's Administrative Coordinating Center is located at Vanderbilt University Medical Center.

eMERGE's first phase, known as eMERGE-I, began after the NHGRI awarded grants to five institutions: Group Health Cooperative, Marshfield Clinic, Mayo Clinic, Northwestern University, and Vanderbilt University. The second phase, eMERGE-II, began in August 2011, involving the same five sites as phase I plus two new ones: the Geisinger Clinic and Mount Sinai School of Medicine.
