= Emilian Voiutschi =

Romanian theologian and cleric (1850–1920)

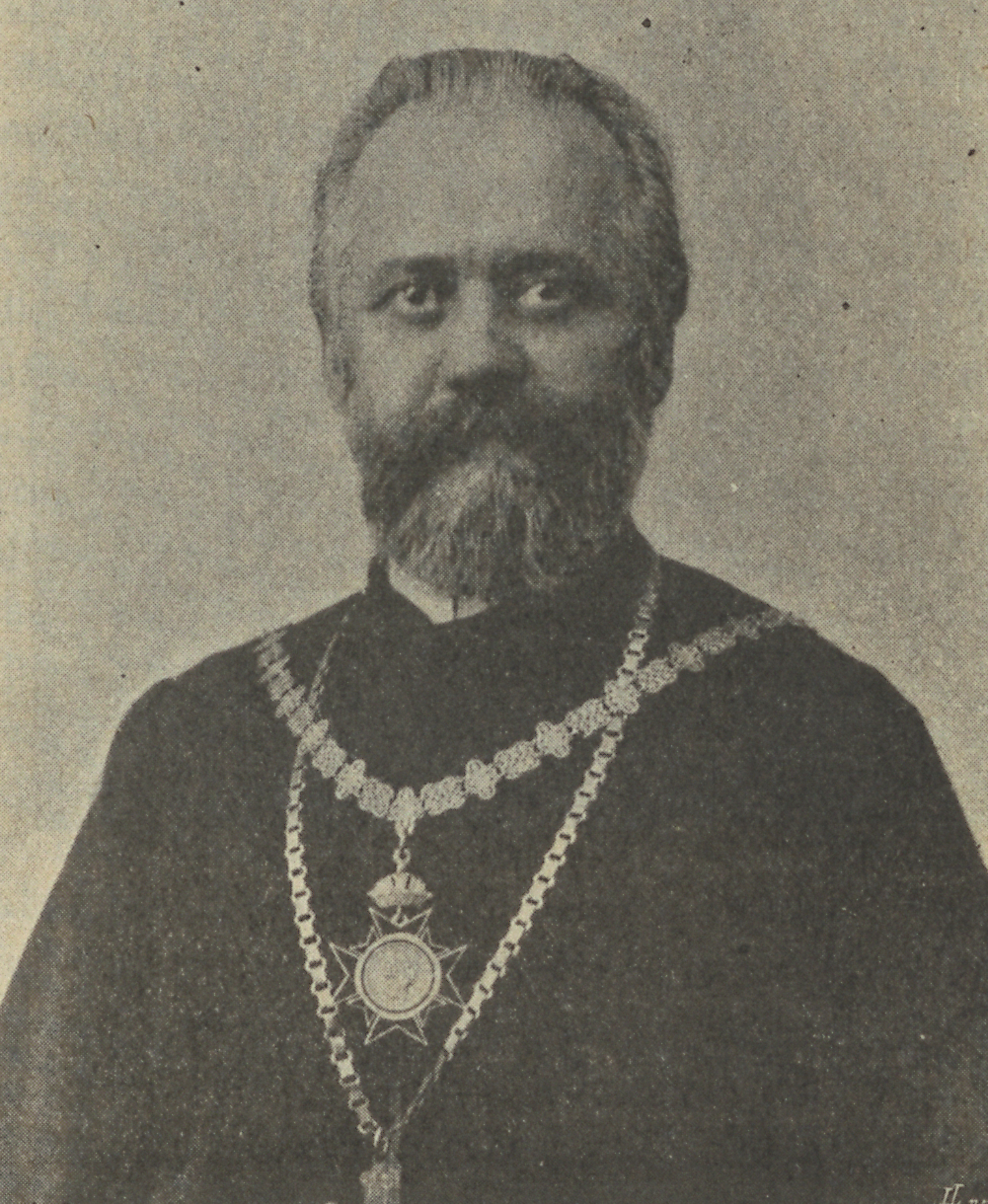
Emilian Voiutschi

Emilian Voiutschi (March 31, 1850—December 6, 1920) was an Imperial Austrian-born Romanian theologian and cleric of the Romanian Orthodox Church.

Born in Czernowitz (Cernăuți), he attended the gymnasium in his native city as well as the local theological institute, from 1870 to 1874. From 1874 to 1877, he took specialized courses on the Old Testament and on Semitic languages at the Theology faculties of Vienna, Innsbruck and Strasbourg. In 1881, he became the first individual to receive a doctorate in Theology from Czernowitz University. From 1878 to 1891, he was prefect of studies at Czernowitz seminary. Ordained a priest in 1881, he was hired as assistant professor the same year at Czernowitz University, in the moral theology department of the Theology faculty. He advanced to associate professor in 1884 and full professor in 1888, a position he held until his death. Additionally, in the Old Testament department, he was assistant professor from 1897 to 1900, served as dean of the faculty during five academic years and was twice rector of the university (1892-1893 and 1901-1902). An editor of the theological magazine Candela from 1894 to 1910, he was also director of the printing press for the Bukovina Metropolis, inspector of diocesan schools and advisor to the Metropolitan of Cernăuți.

Voiutschi published a number of studies dealing with morals and with the Old Testament.
