= Richard Pribram =

Austrian chemist (1847–1928)

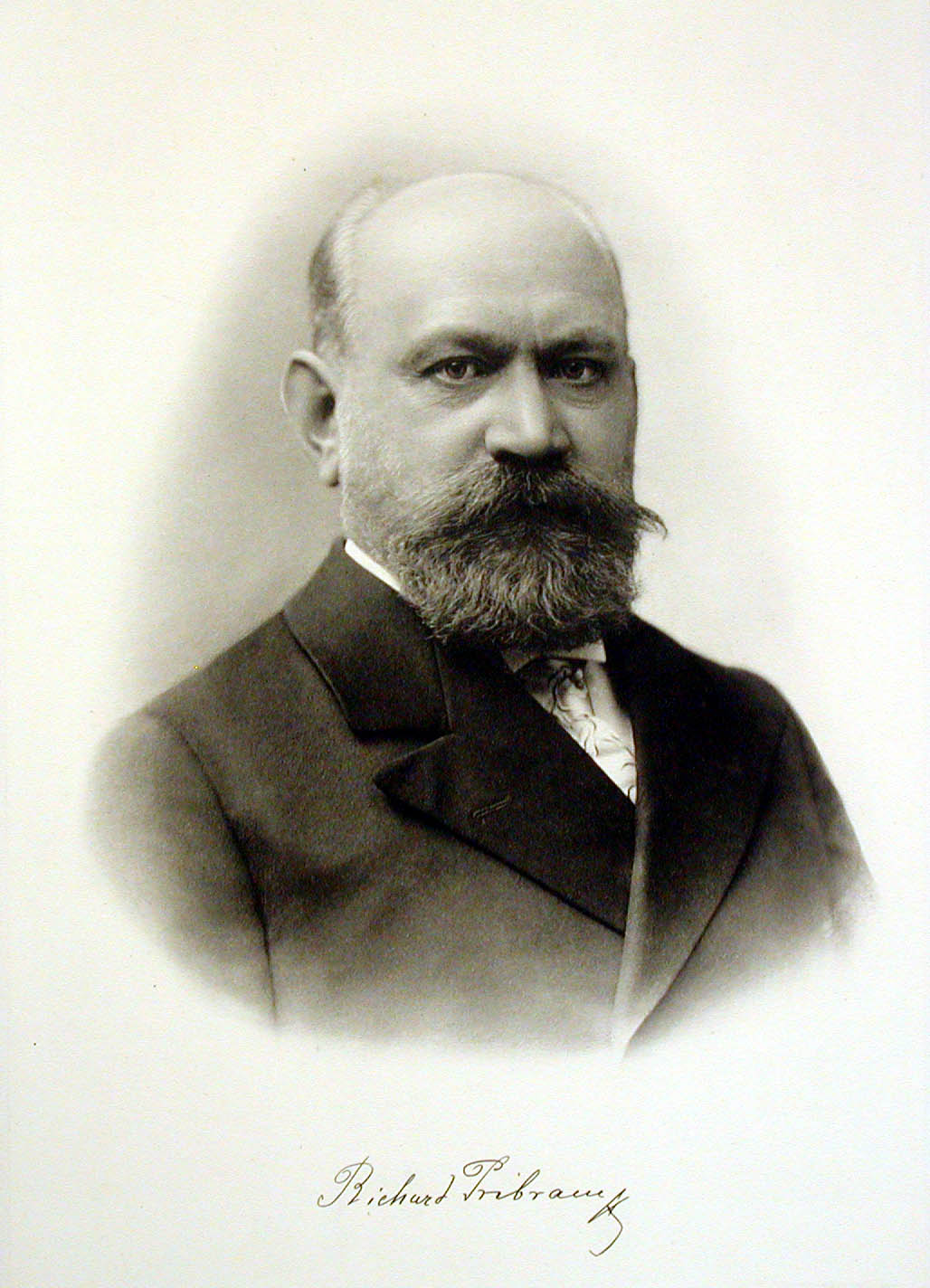
Richard Pribram

Richard Pribram (21 April 1847 – 7 January 1928) was an Austrian chemist. He was the brother of internist Alfred Pribram (1841–1912).

== Biography ==
On Jewish descent, Pribram was born on 21 April 1847 in Prague. He studied chemistry at Charles University in Prague and the Ludwig-Maximilians-Universität München (under Justus Liebig), later becoming an assistant of organic chemistry at Leipzig University. In 1872, he obtained his habilitation at Charles University in Prague, where he worked as a lecturer until 1874. He later taught classes at the University of Czernowitz, becoming a full professor of general and analytical chemistry in 1879. At the University of Czernowitz, he served as dean to the faculty (1883–84) and rector (1891–92).

As a chemist he conducted analyses of mineral springs in Bucovina, and with Alois Handl (1837–1915), he researched the viscosity of various organic compounds. With Neumann Wender he was co-author of Anleitung zur Prüfung und Gehaltsbestimmung der Arzneistoffe für Apotheker, Chemiker, Aerzte und Sanitätsbeamte ("Guidance on testing and assay of drugs for pharmacists, chemists, doctors and medical officers") (1893).

Pribram died on 7 January 1928 in Berlin, at the age of 80.

== See also ==
- Austrium
