= Chernivtsi University =

Public university in Chernivtsi, Ukraine

Yuriy Fedkovych Chernivtsi National University
- ДЗВО "Черновицький національний університет імені Ю.Федьковича"
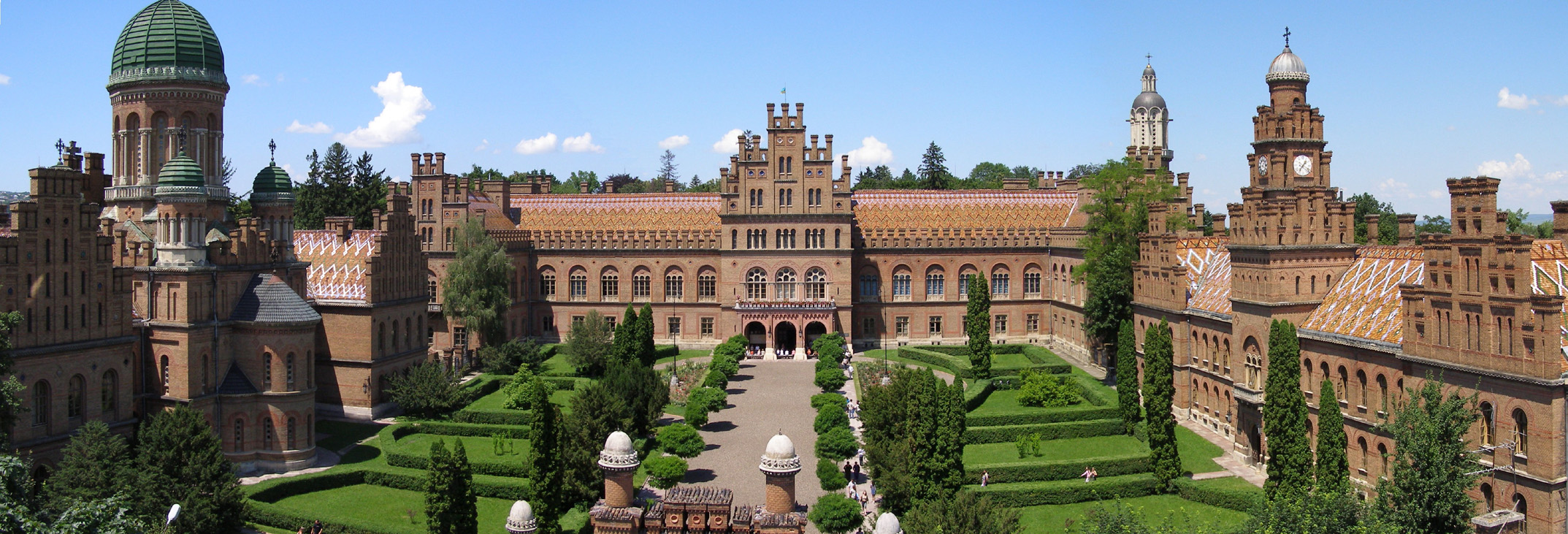
- Type: Public
- Established: 4 October 1875
- Founder: Franz Joseph I
- Affiliations: EUA, Ministry of Education and Science of Ukraine
- Chancellor: Roman I. Petryshyn
- Students: 19,227
- Location: Chernivtsi, Ukraine
- Website: www.chnu.edu.ua
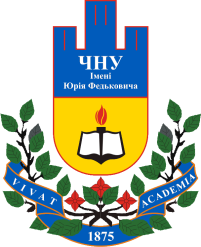

University rankings

Regional – Overall
- QS Emerging Europe and Central Asia: 301-350 (2022)

The Chernivtsi National University (named after Yuriy Fedkovych, fully titled Yuriy Fedkovych Chernivtsi National University, Ukrainian: Чернівецький національний університет імені Юрія Федьковича) is a public university in the city of Chernivtsi in Western Ukraine. One of the leading Ukrainian institutions for higher education, it was founded in 1875 as the Franz-Josephs-Universität Czernowitz when Chernivtsi (Czernowitz) was the capital of the Duchy of Bukovina, a Cisleithanian crown land of Austria-Hungary. Today the university is based at the Residence of Bukovinian and Dalmatian Metropolitans building complex, a UNESCO World Heritage Site since 2011.

== History ==
In 1775, the Austrian Habsburg monarchy had obtained the territory of Bukovina, which from 1786 was governed as the Chernivtsi district within the Galicia. Under the rule of Emperor Joseph II, the sparsely populated territory was settled by German colonists, mainly from Swabia. Together with the Austrian administration they formed a separate population group and by the late 19th century, several institutes of higher education arose with the German language of instruction, including Gymnasien in Chernivtsi and Suceava. As the graduates still had to leave Bukovina to study in the western parts of the Austro-Hungarian monarchy, the local administration developed plans to found their own university.

=== Franz-Josephs-Universität ===
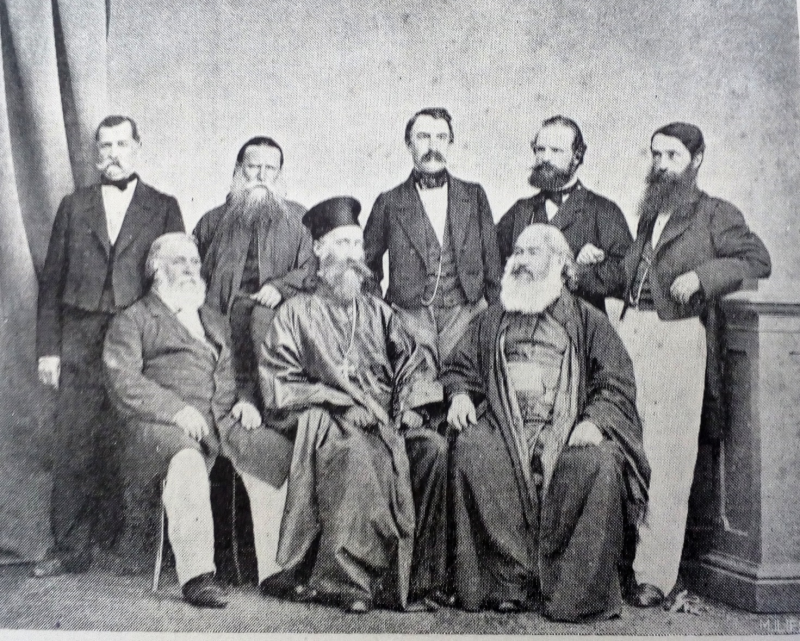
The first Committee for the Construction of the University of Czernowitz: Eudoxiu Hurmuzachi, Teofil Bendela, Josef Hlávka are all visible in this photograph

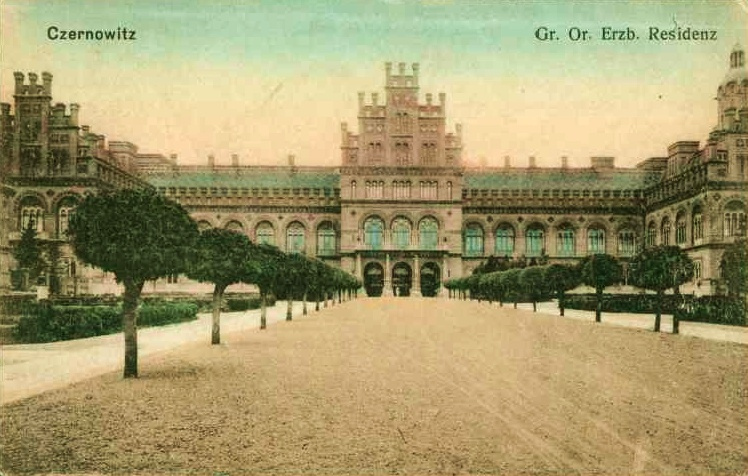
Archiepiscopal residence, postcard, c. 1900

In 1866, the Austrian Empire had lost the war against Prussia ending the German Confederation, which was followed by the establishment of the German Empire in 1871. In turn, Habsburg emperor Francis Joseph I turned his attention to his eastern crown lands. Plans for a Germanophone university were modelled on the establishment in 1872 of the University of Straßburg Kaiser-Wilhelms-Universität, named after German Emperor William I, in annexed Alsace-Lorraine.

After Lviv University had declared Polish a teaching language in 1871, a Bukovina committee led by the ethnically Romanian jurist and liberal politician Constantin Tomashchuk (1840–1889), a member of the Imperial Council, called for the foundation of a German college in multilingual Czernowitz about 740 kilometres (460 mi) "beyond" Vienna. In 1874 they addressed a petition to the Austrian minister of education Karl von Stremayr, on whose proposal Emperor Francis Joseph finally resolved upon the establishment of a university, which was decided on by the two houses of the Imperial Council on 13 and 20 March 1875. Other cities applying for the creation of a college, such as Trieste, Olomouc, Brno, Ljubljana or Salzburg, were unsuccessful.

One hundred years after the affiliation of Bukovina to the Austrian monarchy, the Franz-Josephs-Universität was inaugurated on 4 October 1875 (the name day of the emperor) on the basis of the Czernowitz Higher Theological School. Constantin Tomashchuk was appointed its first rector. The ensemble of the Residence, combining elements of national, Byzantine, Gothic and Baroque architecture, is an outstanding example of 19th-century historicist architecture, design and planning, expressing the cultural identity of the Orthodox Church within the Austro-Hungarian Empire.

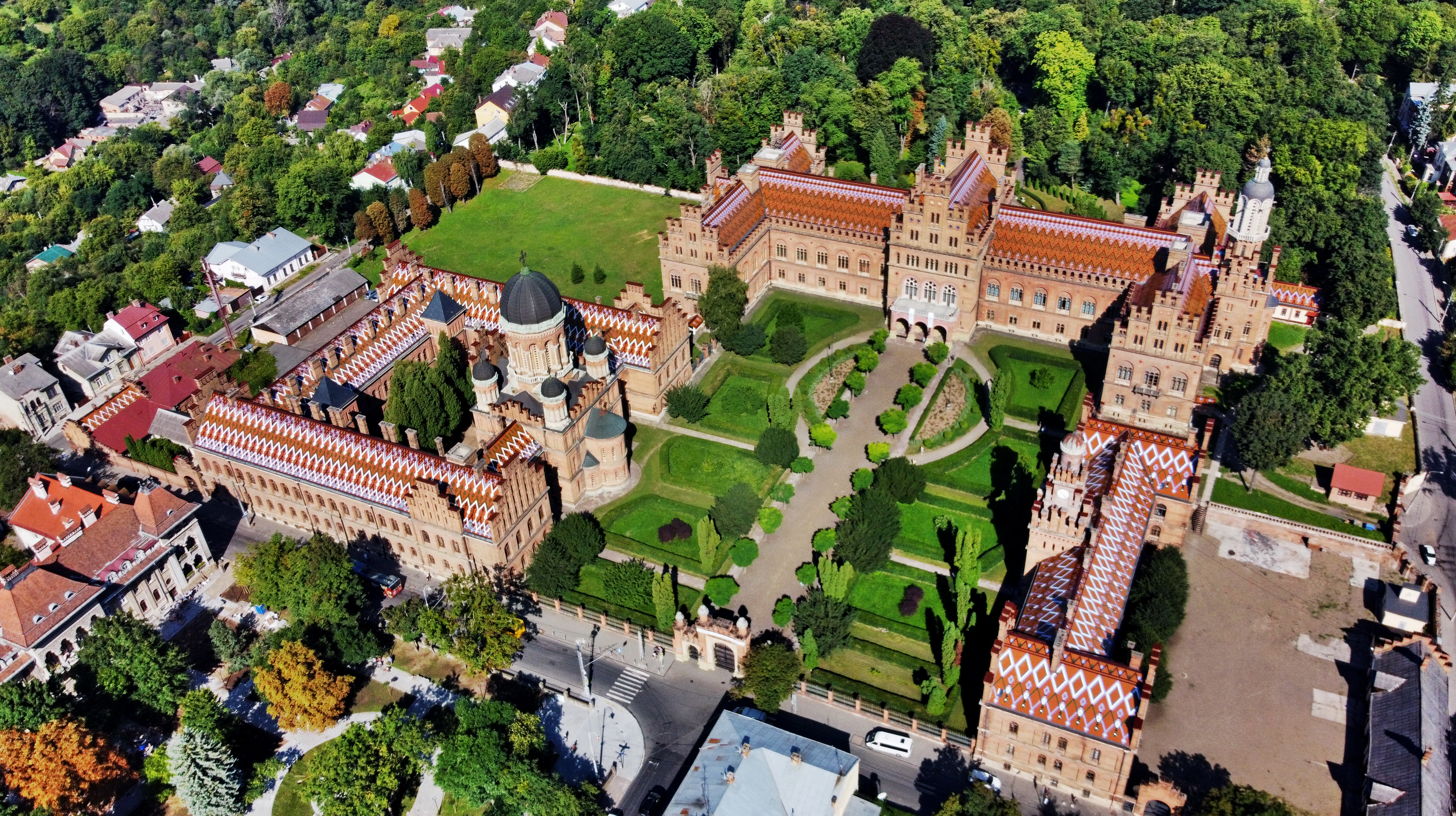
General view of the university

Originally, the main language of instruction was German with separate departments for Ukrainian and Romanian and literature. German was the primary language even though the region it was located in, Bukovina, was not German-speaking, and a few other Austro-Hungarian universities outside of German-speaking areas were shifting away from German-medium teaching. The Emperor saw instruction in German as a means to enable any subject to progress anywhere in the Monarchy or elsewhere in Europe, where German was then the most-spoken language. During the period of Austro-Hungarian rule, the university operated three faculties: Greek Orthodox theology (the only one in Central Europe), jurisprudence and philosophy. To pursue the study of medicine, the Bukovina graduates still had to go to Lviv or to the Jagiellonian University in Kraków.

Though the general language of instruction was German, professorships on Romanian and Ruthenian language were also established. At the time of Austro-Hungarian rule, the majority of the university's students were Jewish and German Austrians, while Ukrainians and Romanians comprised about 20%–25% of the student body. At times, there were more than 40 German, Ukrainian, Romanian, Polish, Jewish, and Catholic fraternities (Studentenverbindungen) in the city, reflecting its linguistic and religious diversity.

In World War I, Czernowitz on the Eastern Front was the scene of battle between Austro-Hungarian and Imperial Russian forces, in which the university was severely affected. Nevertheless, plans for a relocation to Salzburg in the west met with protests from academics such as Eugen Ehrlich and Joseph Schumpeter. In June 1918 teaching activities were resumed after the Treaty of Brest-Litovsk with Soviet Russia.

=== Universitatea Regele Carol I ===
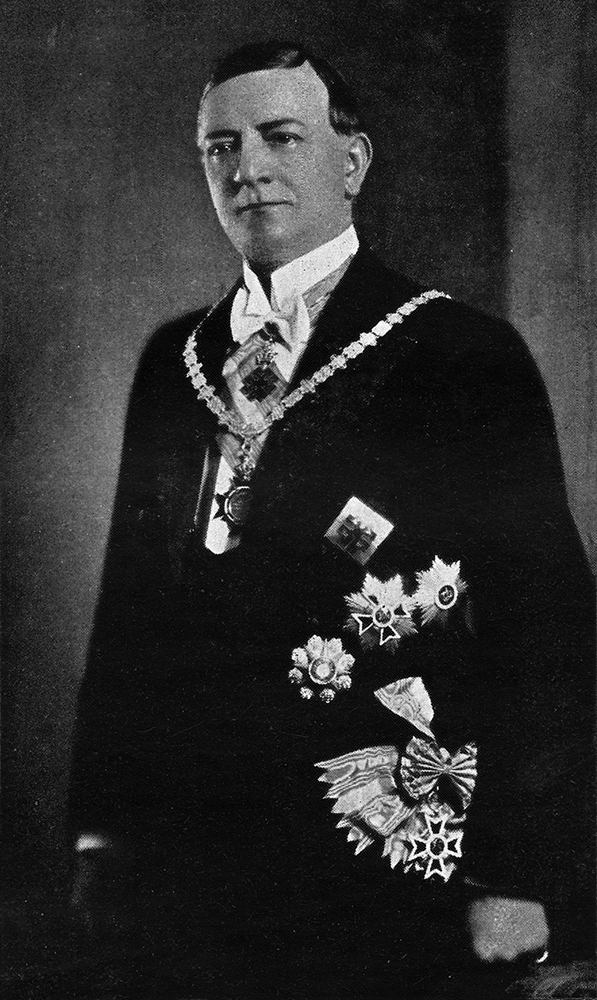
Prof. Dr. Constantin Isopescu-Grecul, 1933 wearing the rector's insignia of Cernăuți University

After the dissolution of Austria-Hungary in 1918, Bukovina became part of the Kingdom of Romania and the university was renamed Universitatea Regele Carol I din Cernăuți. From 1919 to 1940 the university was largely Romanized; the Ukrainian department was abolished, Ukrainian professors were dismissed and instruction was fully switched to Romanian. In 1933, of 3,247 students, there were 2,117 Romanians, 679 Jews, 199 Germans, 155 Ukrainians (decreasing from 239 out of 1671 students in 1920), 57 Poles, 26 Russians and 4 of other nationalities. Ion Nistor, a prominent Romanian historian and one of the most vocal proponents of Greater Romanian nationalism, was the university's rector for many years.

=== Chernivtsi State University ===
In 1940 due to Soviet occupation of northern Bukovina, the territory of Northern Bukovina became part of the Ukrainian Soviet Socialist Republics new Chernivtsi Oblast, and the primary language in the university became Ukrainian. At that time the original carved wooden ceiling of the Synod Hall was lost to fire and was replaced only in the 1950s. The roof has been gradually replaced using quality colour-glazed roof tiles manufactured according to the original patterns and imported from Austria. The change of function of the ensemble, initially being the Residence of Metropolitans and becoming a university did not unduly affect its authenticity.

The university, renamed Chernivtsi State University, was significantly expanded and reorganized, with new buildings in other parts of Chernivtsi being allocated for use of university. In 1976–1977, the university had 10,000 students and about 500 teachers, 26 specialists and doctors of sciences, about 290 associate professors and candidates of sciences. Teaching of science was greatly increased and the theological department was dissolved and then reopened in 1996. In the Soviet period, the number of Romanian students at the university declined sharply. In 1991–92, the last year of Soviet rule, the number of Romanian students was only 4.44% (434 out of 9,769). Of the academic staff, the breakdown by nationality is: Ukrainians 465 (77.1%), Russians 102 (16.9%), Moldovans 9 (1.4%) and Romanians 7 (1.1%), Belarusians 6 (0.9%).

=== Yuriy Fedkovych Chernivtsi National University ===
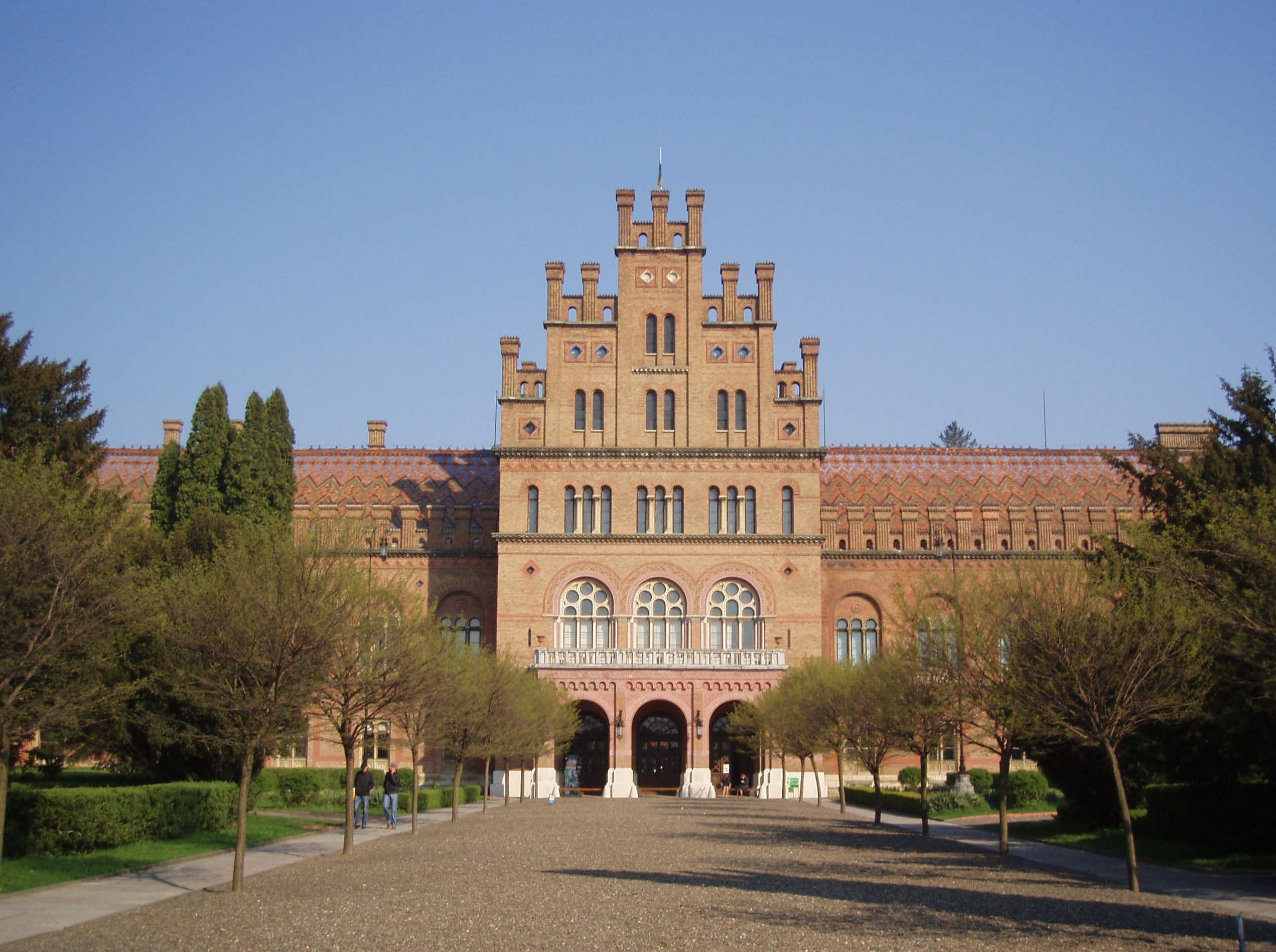
Residence of Bukovinian and Dalmatian Metropolitans

Since 1989, it operates under its current name, Yuriy Fedkovych Chernivtsi National University, being named after Ukrainian writer, poet, translator and folklorist Yuriy Fedkovych, a herald of Ukrainian national Renaissance.

After the fall of Soviet Union, University began to enter international stage of education and research, with one of the first steps being accepted as a member of International Universities Organization "Phi Beta Delta" in October 1999. It was subsequently given a status of National University on September 11, 2000, by a presidents decree.

By decision of Session of Council of European University Association, held in Brussels on 15 January 2009, Yuriy Fedkovich Chernivtsi National University was granted a full individual membership in European University Association. On June 29, 2011, the 35th Session of the UNESCO World Heritage Committee decided to include the central building of the university - the former residence of the Metropolitan of Bukovina and Dalmatia, on the World Heritage List.

On October 4, 2015, on the day of the 140th anniversary of the founding, university restored the monument to the first rector of the university, deputy of the Austrian Parliament and the Regional Diet, Honorary Citizen of Chernivtsi Kostyantyn Tomashchuk, in the place it was originally created in 1897

In 2016, according to the resolution of the Cabinet of Ministers of Ukraine, Bukovina State Financial and Economic University was affiliated to Chernivtsi National University.

As of April 2019, the rector of Chernivtsi National University is Professor Petryshyn Roman Ivanovich, PhD in Physical and Mathematical Sciences.

As of April 2019, the Fedkovych Chernivtsi National University is ranked third in the ranking of Ukrainian higher education institutions by the Scopus scientometric database, which provides records of scientists' publications, institutions and statistics of their citation.

== Campuses and buildings ==
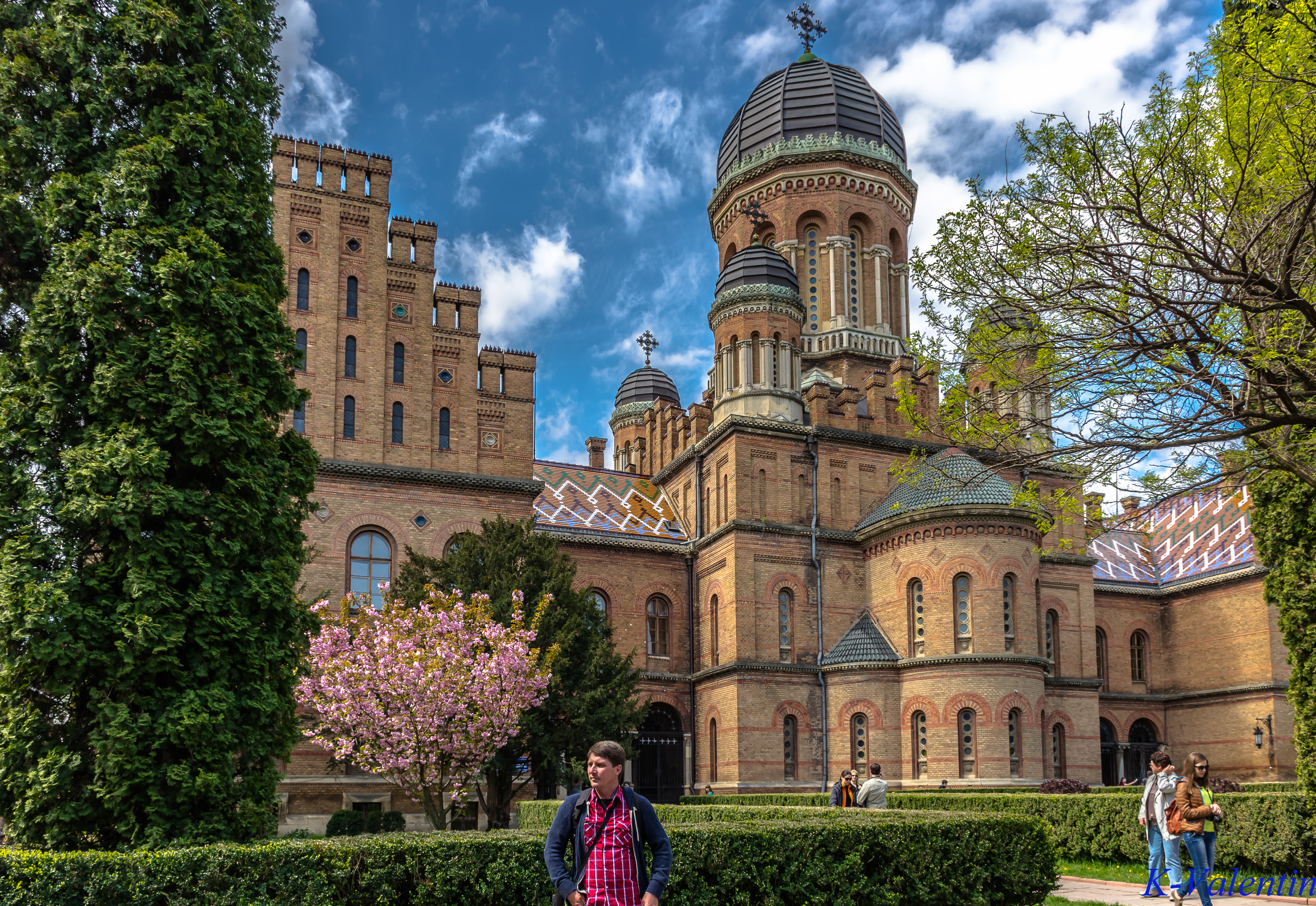
Three Hierarchs Church

Yuriy Fedkovych Chernivtsi National University consists of 17 buildings having a total of 105 units. The total area is 110,800 square meters, including training buildings of 66 square meters.

The architectural ensemble of the main campus of the university, the Residence of Bukovinian and Dalmatian Metropolitans, is included on the list of UNESCO World Heritage Sites.

The university operates Chernivtsi Botanical Garden, which features over a thousand different spices and an arboretum located on the territory of the main campus.

== Institutes and faculties ==
- Institute of Biology, Chemistry and Bioresources
- Institute of Physics, Engineering and Computer Studies
- Faculty of Geography
- Faculty of Economics
- Faculty of Modern European Languages
- Faculty of History, Political Science and International Relations
- Faculty of Mathematics and Informatics
- Faculty of Pedagogics, Psychology and Social Activity
- Faculty of Philology
- Faculty of Philosophy and Theology
- Faculty of Law
- Faculty of Physical Training and Health
- Faculty of Architecture, Construction, Arts and Crafts

== Libraries ==
The university library was founded in 1852 as Krayova Library — the first public library in Bukovina. By 2004, its total book stock included 2,554,000 copies and among them 1,215,000 copies of scientific literature, 171,000 of textbooks and manuals, and 648,000 of fiction. The fund of foreign books contains 376,000 works in German, Romanian, English, Latin, Polish, Ancient Greek, French, Hebraic, Yiddish and other languages.

The scientific library includes 11 departments: collection, scientific processing, native fund preservation, foreign fund preservation, rare and valuable books, book borrowing, reading halls, branch, cultural work, information technologies and information-bibliographic.

== International relations ==
The university has partnerships with universities in Austria, Belarus, Bulgaria, Bosnia, United Kingdom, Estonia, Israel, Spain, China, Latvia, Moldova, Germany, South Korea, Norway, Poland, Romania, Serbia, Slovenia, Slovakia, United States, Turkey, France, Croatia, Finland, Czech Republic. It participates in projects and in the framework of cross border cooperation programmes such as TEMPUS, EMERGE – Erasmus Mundus European Mobility with Neighboring Region in the East: Ukraine, Moldova, Belarus, Jean Monnet Programme, ERASMUS Programme. It is also a partner of the EUROSCI Network.

== Notable professors and alumni ==
- Sydir Vorobkevych (1836–1903), Ukrainian composer and writer.
- Alois Handl (1837–1915), Austrian physicist.
- Anton Wassmuth (1844–1927), Austrian physicist, member of the German Academy of Sciences Leopoldina.
- Anton Marty (1847–1914), Swiss philosopher.
- Alexander Georg Supan (1847–1920), Austrian geographer.
- Leopold Bernhard Gegenbauer (1849–1903), Austrian mathematician.
- Georg Elias Müller (1850–1934), German experimental psychologist.
- Friedrich Becke (1855–1931), Austrian mineralogist and petrograph.
- Eusebius Mandyczewski (1857–1929), Ukrainian musicologist, composer, conductor, and teacher.
- Ivan Franko (1856–1916), Ukrainian poet, writer, social and literary critic, journalist, interpreter, economist, political activist.
- Eugen Ehrlich (1862–1922), Austrian legal scholar, one of the primary founders of the modern field of sociology of law.
- Oleksander Kolessa (1867–1945), Ukrainian ethnographer, philologist and diplomat.
- Mykola Vasylko (Nikolaus Wassilko von Serecki, 1868–1924), Austro-Hungarian and Ukrainian politician and diplomat.
- Josef Geitler von Armingen (1870–1923), Austrian physicist.
- Josip Plemelj (1873–1967), Slovene mathematician.
- Ion Nistor (1876–1962), Romanian historian and politician
- Victor Conrad (1876–1962), Austrian-American physicist, seismologist and meteorologist, professor of Harvard University.
- Nicolae Bălan (1882–1955), Romanian cleric, a metropolitan bishop of the Romanian Orthodox Church
- Joseph Schumpeter (1883–1950), one of the most influential economists of the 20th century, professor at Harvard University.
- Hans Hahn (1879–1934), Austrian mathematician, one of the founders of modern functional analysis.
- Nikolay Bogolyubov (1909–1992), Soviet mathematician and theoretical physicist.
- Alexandrina Cernov (1943–2024), Ukrainian and Romanian academic, literary historian and philologist
- Nazariy Yaremchuk (1951–1995), Ukrainian singer, songwriter, actor, musician, Hero of Ukraine.
- Serhii Rudyk (born 1970), Ukrainian teacher, politician, journalist
- Paun Rohovei (born 1970), Ukrainian diplomat of Romanian ethnicity
- Oleksandr Shevchenko (born 1971) Ukrainian entrepreneur, social activist, politician and a philanthropist.
- Vasyl Filipchuk (born 1971), Ukrainian diplomat, politician, Ministry of Foreign Affairs of Ukraine Spokesperson.
- Arseniy Yatsenyuk (born 1974), Ukrainian politician, economist and Ukrainian prime minister.
- Maksym Kovalenko (born 1982), Ukrainian chemist, professor at ETH Zurich.
- Yuliia Fediv (born 1986), Ukrainian cultural manager and diplomat.

== Honorary doctors ==
- Leonid Kadeniuk, the first astronaut of Ukraine.
- Lina Kostenko, Ukrainian poet and writer.
- Heinz Fischer, the president of Austria.
- Ray Hnatyshyn, 24th governor general of Canada.
- Roy Romanow, the 12th premier of Saskatchewan (1991–2001).
Rectors
- Constantin Tomashchuk (1875–1876)
- (1876–1877)
- (1877–1878)
- (1878–1879)
- (1879–1880)
- Eusebiu Popovici (1880–1881)
- (1881–1882)
- (1882–1883)
- (1883–1884)
- (1884–1885)
- (1885–1886)
- (1886–1887)
- (1887–1888)
- (1888–1889)
- (1889–1890)
- (1890–1891)
- Richard Pribram (1891–1892)
- Emilian Voiutschi (1892–1893)
- (1893–1894)
- (1894–1895)
- Eusebiu Popovici (1895–1896)
- (1896–1897)
- (1897–1898)
- (1898–1899)
- (1899–1900)
- (1900–1901)
- Emilian Voiutschi (1901–1902)
- (1902–1903)
- (1903–1904)
- Teodor Tarnavschi (1904–1905)
- (1905–1906)
- Eugen Ehrlich (1906–1907)
- Yevhen Kozak (1907–1908)
- (1908–1909)
- (1909–1910)
- (1910–1911)
- (1911–1912)
- (1912–1913)
- (1913–1914)
- (1914–1918)
- Vasile Tarnavschi (1918–1920)
- Ion Nistor (1920–1921)
- Maximilian Hacman (1921–1922)
- Eugen Botezat (1922–1923)
- Valerian Șesan (1923–1925)
- Romulus Cândea (1925–1926)
- George Drăgănescu (1926–1927)
- Nicolae Cotos (1927–1928)
- Valerian Șesan (1928–1930)
- Constantin Isopescu-Grecul (1930–1933)
- Ion Nistor (1933–1940)
- (1940–1941)
- (1944–1949)
- (1949–1967)
- Konstantin Chervinskiy (1968–1987)
- (1987–2001)
- (2001–2005)
- (2005–2009)
- (2009–2013)
- Stepan Vasyliovych Melnychuk (2013–2017)

== Interesting facts ==
- First Ukrainian mystery thriller Ukrainian: Тіні незабутих предків, romanized: Tini nezabutykh predkiv, lit. 'Shadows of Unforgotten Ancestors', 2013, was filmed mostly on the territory of Chernivtsi University.

== See also ==
- List of universities in Ukraine
- Higher education in Ukraine
- Ministry of Education and Science of Ukraine
- Bukovina
- Chernivtsi
- List of modern universities in Europe (1801–1945)
