= Chernivtsi National University Botanical Garden =

Botanical garden in Chernivtsi, Ukraine

- Ботанічний сад Чернівецького національного університету
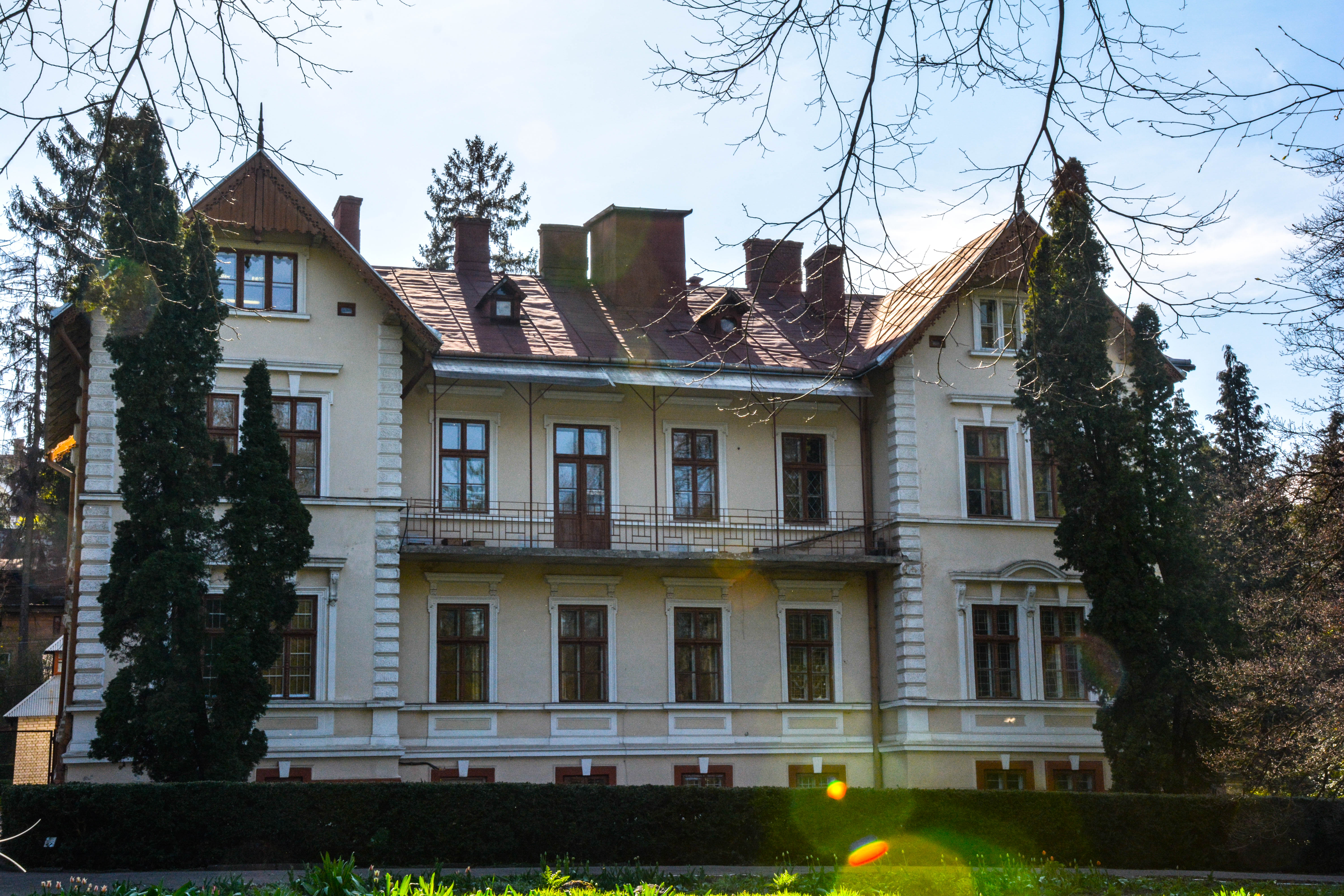
- Main building
- Interactive map of Chernivtsi National University Botanical Garden
- Type: Botanical garden
- Location: 11 Fedkovycha street, Chernivtsi, Ukraine
- Coordinates: 48°16′44″N 25°56′14″E
- Area: 3.5 ha (8.6 acres)
- Created: 1877
- Operator: Chernivtsi National University
- Director: Tetiana Derevenko

The Chernivtsi National University Botanical Garden is a botanical garden and a subdivision of Chernivtsi National University located in Chernivtsi, Ukraine. Founded in 1877, it remains one of the oldest scientific gardens in Ukraine. Since 1983, it is designated as a botanical garden of national significance.

The garden covers an area of 3.5 hectares (8.64 acres). Additionally, a 5 hectares (12.35 acres) Chernivtsi Arboretum located on the territory of the Residence of Bukovinian and Dalmatian Metropolitans is administered under the structure of the botanical garden.

== History ==
The botanical garden was founded in 1877, by the decree of the Ministry of Education of Austria-Hungary and was implemented by the city magistrate. The creation of the garden lasted eleven years and was headed by an Austrian professor Eduard Tangl, who was the head of the Department of Botany at Chernivtsi University.

Seedlings of bushes and trees were brought from the Muskau nursery. The creation of a collection of North American species of trees and shrubs began. Planting of the first seedlings took place under the guidance and according to the project of gardener Karol Bauer, who worked on the development of the territory of the garden until 1894.

Since 1918, the cultivation of plants that were widespread in Bukovina began. During the Second World War, certain parts of the tree plantations were lost. The closed soil collections were preserved in their entirety. After the 1940s, the territory of the botanical garden was transferred over to the Chernivtsi National University. Acclimatization and introduction of medicinal, essential oil, fodder and fruit plants became the main directions of the development of the protected area, with more than 500 new species of plants introduced.

In 1969, the botanical garden received the status of a scientific institution. In the 1970s, a two-story greenhouse was built. The botanical garden became an object of the nature conservation fund in 1983.

In 2008, repair works began on the territory of the garden. The greenhouse, in which relict plants are located, was subject to renovation.

== Garden features ==
A white poplar, planted by Eduard Tangl, grows on the territory of the botanical garden, which is likely the first tree to be planted there. The modern botanical garden is divided into several departments: dendrology, park science, tropical plants, subtropical plants and herbaceous plants. A herbarium and a seed laboratory are also present.

920 species of tropical plants grow in the greenhouse, the area of which is 525 m². Deciduous plants are represented by 755 species. Coniferous plants are represented by 437 species. There are more than 100 varieties of tulips, 70 types of daffodils, 70 species of irises, 60 species of chrysanthemums, 145 species of cacti and 18 types of magnolia trees, including saucer magnolias which are over 70 years old.

A Weymouth pine, a swamp cypress, several species of ash, oak, catalpa and larch trees, a number of pagoda trees and an American tulip tree that grow at the garden are known to be over 100 years old, being one of the first tree species planted in the garden.

Types of small flowers are presented in the garden, including snowdrops, hyacinths and snowbells, as well as barberry and various types of rhododendron shrubs. Several rare species are found in the garden: akebia quinata, sequoiadendron and a blue bean shrub.

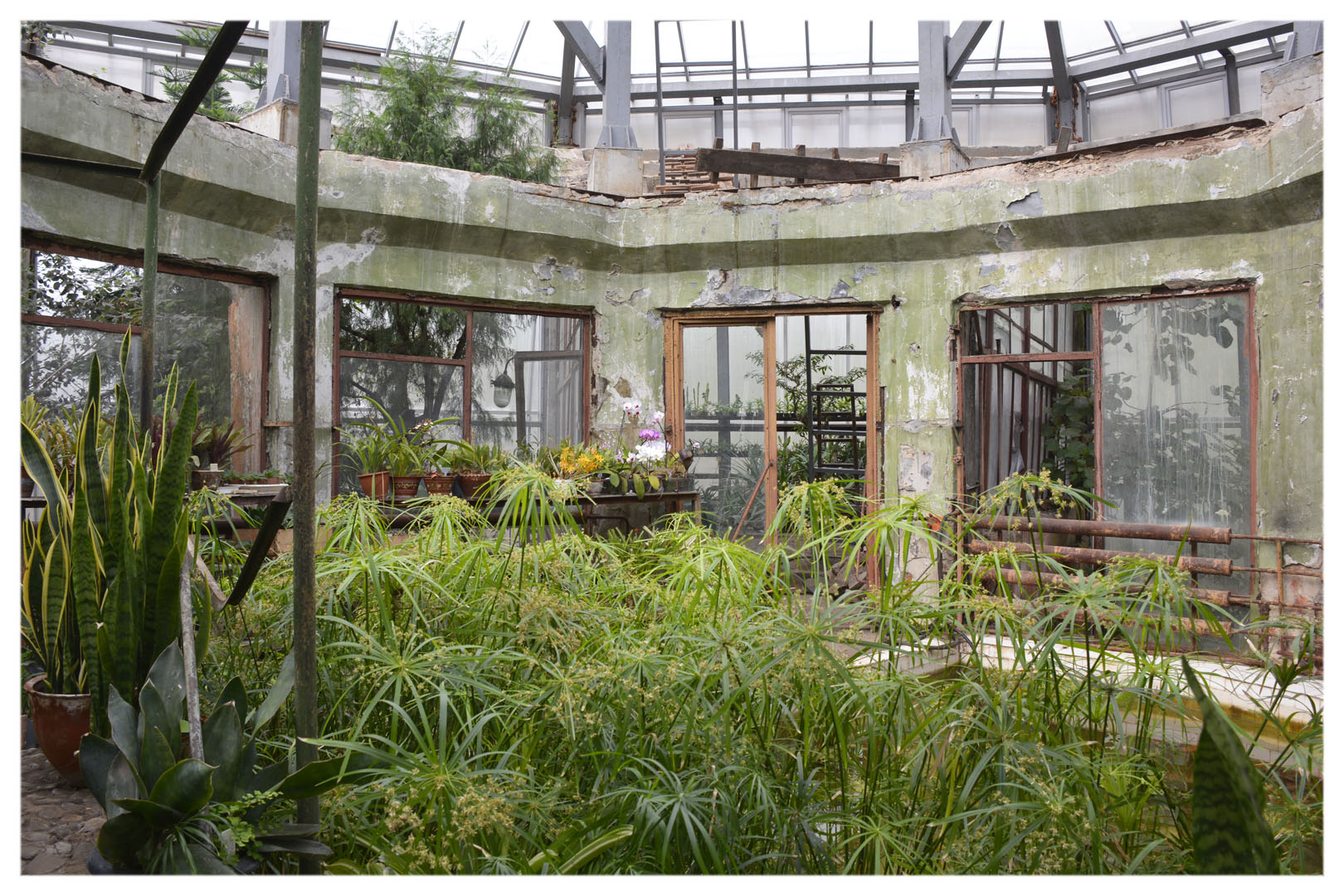
Inside of the glasshouse

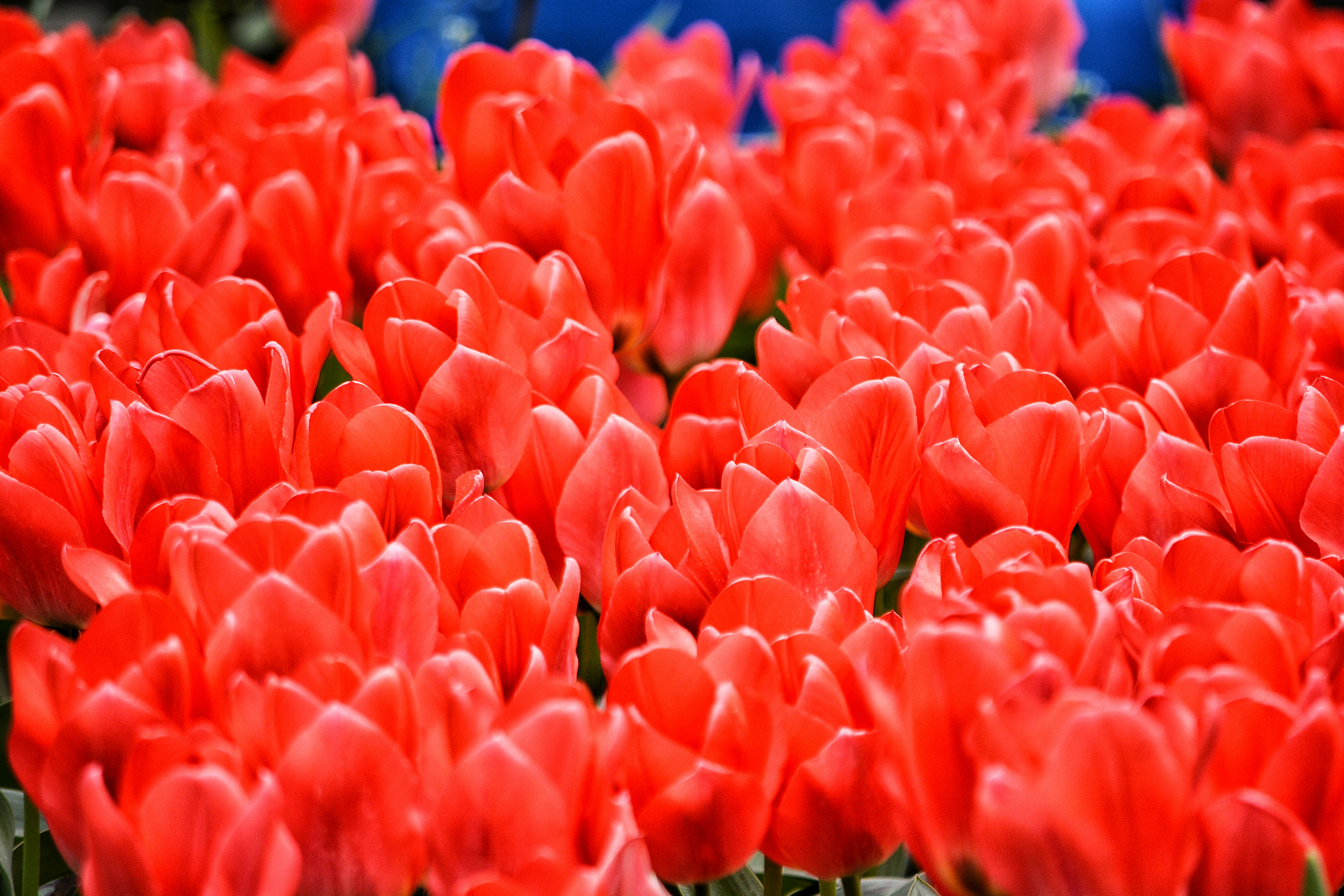
Tulips

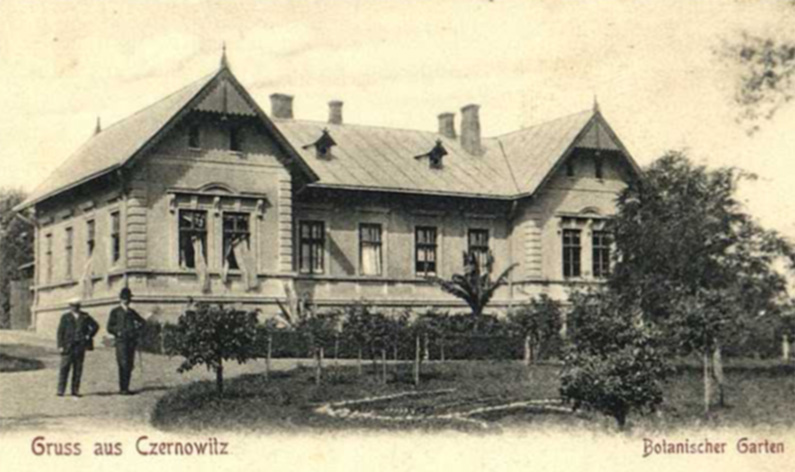
Main building in the early 20th century

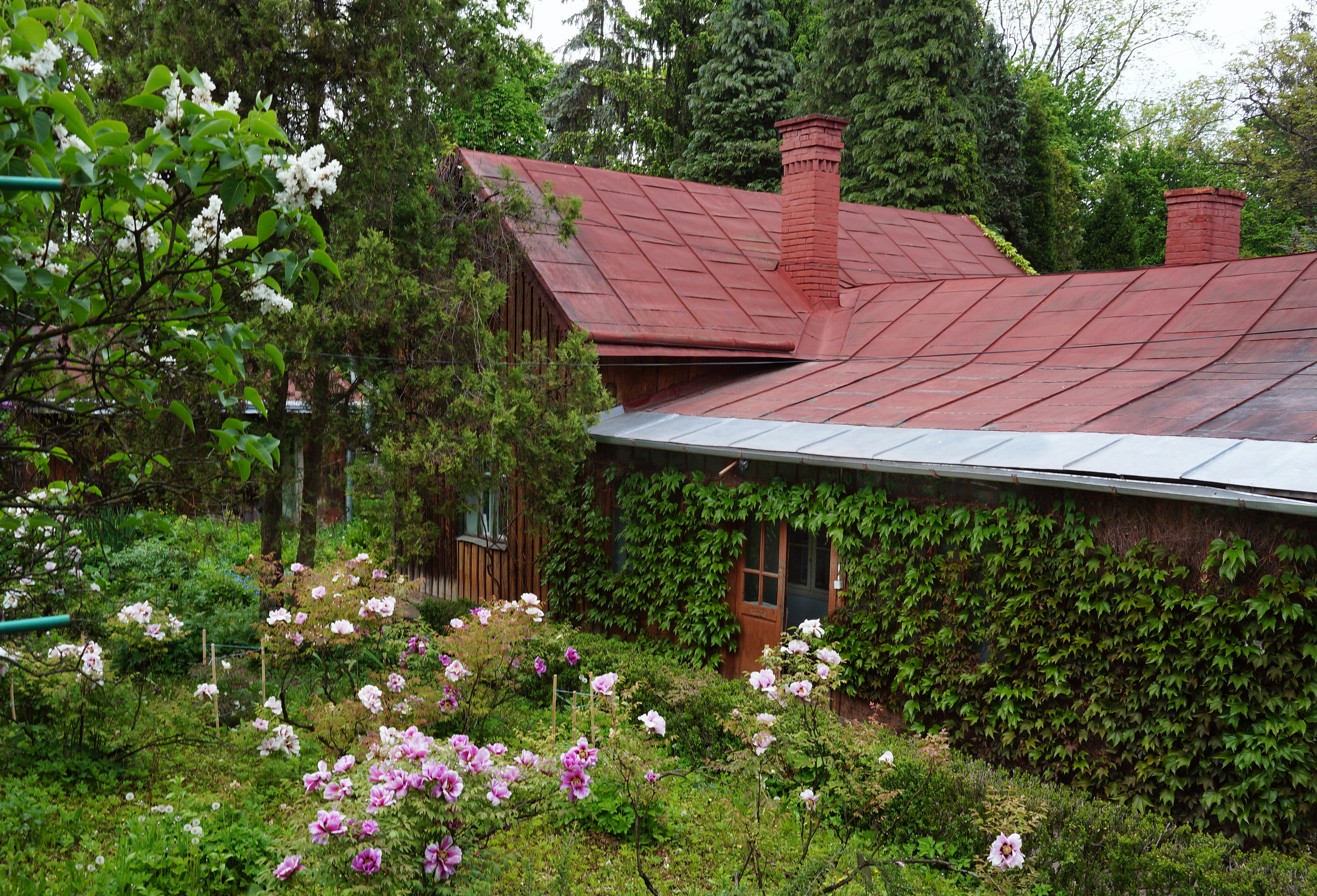

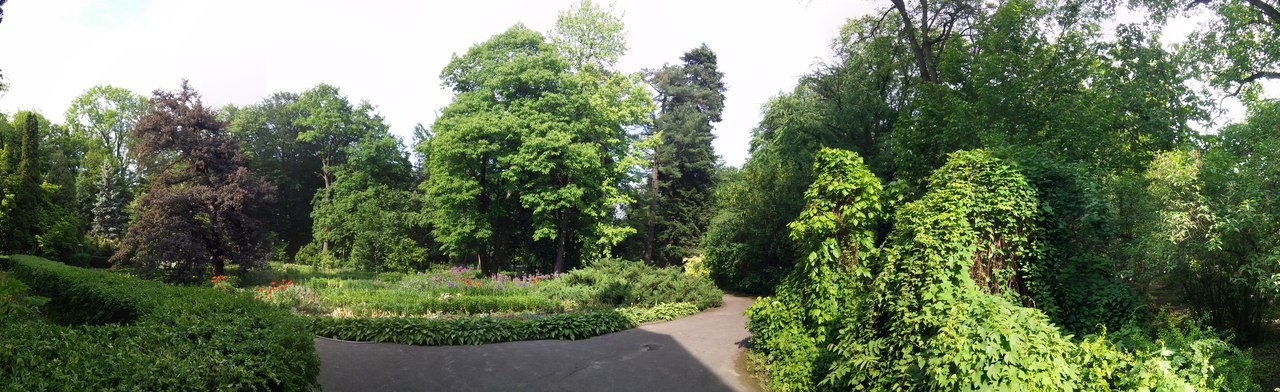

== Sources ==
- Terletskyi V., Fodor S., Hladun Ya. Botanical treasures of the Carpathians – Uzhhorod: Karpaty. – 1985. – p. 136
- Media related to Botanical garden of Chernivtsi University at Wikimedia Commons
