= Eusebiu Popovici =

Austro-Hungarian cleric and professor (1838–1922)

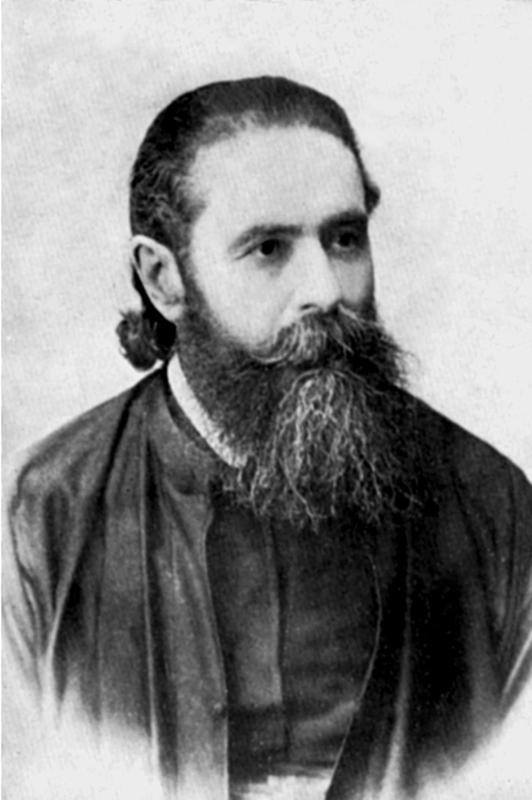
Eusebiu Popovici

Eusebiu Popovici (February 15, 1838 – September 28, 1922) was an Austro-Hungarian-born Romanian Orthodox cleric and professor.

Born in Cernăuți, capital of the Duchy of Bukovina, his father Constantin Popoviciu was a professor. After attending high school (1849–1856) and the theological institute (1857–1860), he studied church history and canon law at the University of Vienna (1860–1861). Returning to the institute, he was a substitute professor teaching the Old Testament from 1862 to 1866. He then taught in the church history and law department (1866–1875). From 1875 to 1908, he taught in the same department at the new Czernowitz University. During his lengthy teaching career, he substituted in practically all the theology departments, but church history was his particular specialty. He was dean of the theology faculty six times: 1883–1884, 1884–1885, 1887, 1889–1890, 1894–1895 and 1901–1902. He was university rector on two occasions: 1880–1881 and 1895–1896.

Ordained a priest in 1863, he rose to archpriest in 1874 and cross-bearer in 1880. From 1884 until his death, he was a diocesan adviser. After becoming a monk, he was named administrative vicar in 1913, serving until 1918. He helped set up the Library of Bukovina, which he supervised in 1861–1871. He was a founding member of the Romanian Reading Society (1862) and of the Society for Romanian Culture and Literature in Bukovina (1865). He was part of Bukovina's school council from 1869 to 1876 and sat on the Austrian equivalent from 1877 to 1896. He was elected an honorary member of the Romanian Academy in February 1908. He authored influential books, while his studies and articles appeared in Junimea Literară, Candela and Biserica Ortodoxă Română. An erudite teacher and a polyglot, he was interested in linguistics, preparing a Romanian grammar textbook. Among his translations was Commentarii de Bello Gallico. He died in Cernăuți.
