= Alfred Pribram =

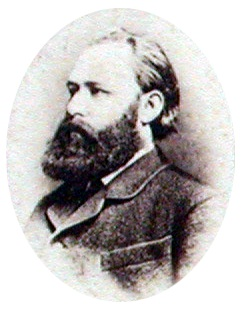
- Born: May 11, 1841; Prague, Austrian Empire
- Died: April 14, 1912 (aged 70)
- Relatives: Richard Pribram (brother)

Alfred Pribram (11 May 1841 – 14 April 1912) was an internist born in Prague, Austrian Empire. He was a brother of chemist Richard Pribram (1847–1928). His son was the internist Hugo Pribram (1881–1943).

== Biography ==
He studied medicine at the University of Prague, earning his doctorate as a general practitioner in 1861 and as a surgeon during the following year. From 1867 to 1871 he worked as an assistant to Anton von Jaksch (1810–1887) at the second medical clinic in Prague. In 1871 he received his habilitation, and in 1887 was appointed full professor of special pathology and therapy at the University of Prague. Among his better known students was physician Eduard Bloch (1872–1945).

Pribram is remembered for his extensive research of arthritis, typhoid and typhinia (relapsing fever).

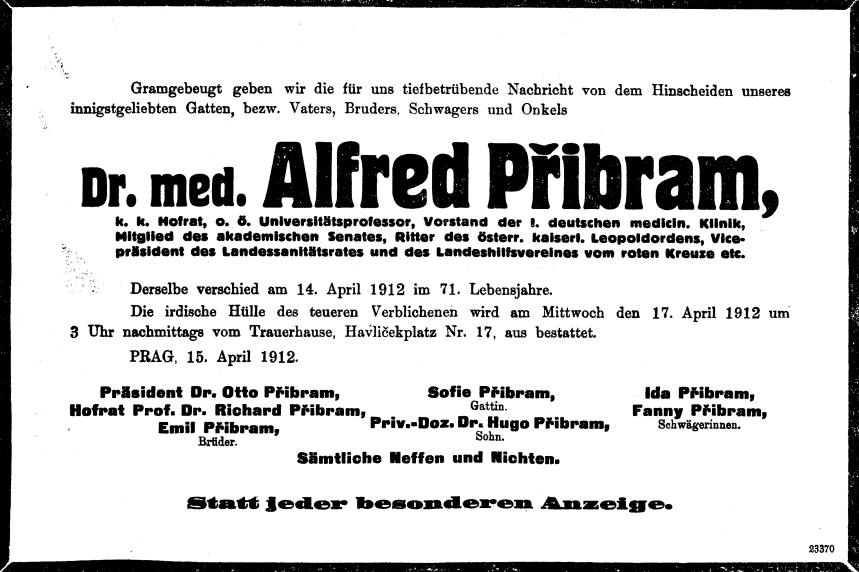
Obituary for Alfred Pribram

== Selected publications ==
- Studien über Febris Recurrens, (Studies on relapsing fever); with Josef Robitschek, 1868
- Studien über Cholera (Studies on cholera), 1869
- Studien über die Zuckerlose Harnruhr (Studies on diabetes insipidus), 1870
- Ueber die Sterblichkeit in Prag (About the mortality rate in Prague), 1873
- Ueber die Verbreitungsweise des Abdominal und Flecktyphus (On the spread of abdominal and spotted typhus), 1880
- Die Neurasthenie und ihre Behandlung (Neurasthenia and its treatment), 1889
- Ueber den Unterricht in der Innern Medizin an der Universität in Prag in der Letzten Hälfte des Jahrhunderts etc., 1899
- Der acute Gelenkrumatismus (Acute rheumatism of the joints), 1899
- Grundzüge der Therapie (Main features of therapy), 1907.
