= Dendropark "Podillya" =

Part of botanical gardens in Vinnytsia Oblast, Ukraine

Coordinates: 49°13′4″N 28°25′13″E

Dendropark "Podillya" is part of the "Podillya" Botanical Gardens at Vinnytsia National Agrarian University.

== General information ==
It was founded in 1963. The gardens cover an area of 70 hectares (170 acres). It has more than 10,000 seedlings of hornbeam, more than 700 thousand trees and shrubs, over 650 species of plants. Its arboretum hosts over 600 species of trees and shrubs. The botanical garden is located in the western part of Vinnytsia on the northern and southern slopes of the river Vyshnya. It is part of a green ring around the city with the Pirogov museum.

== Sections of the dendropark ==
The gardens include the following sections:

1. Arboretum
2. Typological forest department
3. Department of pomology (fruit crops)
4. Systematic division of herbaceous plants
5. Department ornamental crops
6. Nursery ornamental and wild fruit crops
7. Department of Science and Environment
8. Winter garden with a collection of subtropical plants unique for Podillya
