= Oles Semernya =

Ukrainian artist

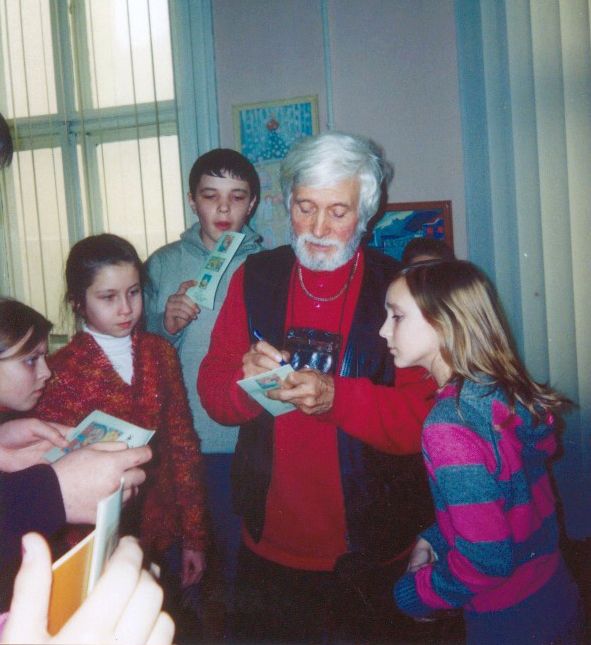
- Born: Alexander Semernya; 2 August 1936; Mykolaivka, Berdyansk district, Zaporizhia Oblast, Ukraine
- Died: 6 July 2012 (aged 75); Sokiryany, Sokyryany district, Chernivtsi Oblast, Ukraine
- Other name: "Master of Folk Art"
- Occupations: Artist, philosopher
- Style: Ukrainian naive painting

Oles Semernya (Ukrainian: Олесь Семерня; 2 August 1936 – 6 July 2012) was a Ukrainian artist, working mainly in Ukraine and Moldova. He is one of the most prominent representatives of Ukrainian naive painting of the 20th century and the beginning of the 21st century. He is the author of more than 600 paintings. Oles Semernya was a member of the Union of Folk Art Masters of Ukraine and a member of the Moldovan and Ukrainian Charity Foundation of Professional Artists and Craftsmen "Renaştere-Відродження" (Renaissance).

== Biography ==
=== Childhood ===
Oles Semernya was born on 2 August 1936 in the village of Mykolaivka Berdiansk Raion of Zaporizhzhia region. He spent his childhood in the Mariupol Raion. His mother was Maria Kasian, and his father was Fyodor Semernya. In the late 1940s, Oles, his mother and younger brother were sent to the city of Jezkazgan Karaganda region of Kazakhstan (near Baikonur) for the fact that his mother worked as a nurse in a German hospital during the German occupation. Later, he served in the Soviet Army there (1954–1956).

=== The first works ===
Semernya painted since his childhood. After his military service, the longing for Ukraine had led Semernya to the city of Voznesensk, Mykolaiv Oblast. There he got married and started painting. He became a member of the creative association "Prybuzhia" where his first solo exhibition was held in 1970. In 1977 he received the title of "Master of Folk Art." However, almost no one (including his wife who was a specialist in medicine) did not appreciate his creativity. Not finding support and understanding, Oles ran away from civilization and started living as a vagrant, further he found home in the village of Kriva Pustosh, and later left Ukraine, as he had neither own property nor a workshop.

=== Moldavian period, 1980s ===
For a long time Semernya lived and worked in Bălți (Moldova, then the Moldavian SSR), where numerous of his paintings came into being, of which – "Old Town", "Tarutine", "Water carrier", "Altar". However, the artist did not break ties with Ukraine. The first exhibition was held in Mykolaiv in the early 80s, which was organized by local art critic Valery Malina. Real discovery occurred after the exhibition of the artist at the Institute of Art Studies, Folklore and Ethnology of the Academy of Sciences (1982) and the Writers' Union of Ukraine (1983). Further, works by Semernya, as well as by Ivan Marchuk and others, were exhibited at the library of Kyiv Medical Institute, at the Institute of Physics and semiconductors of Ukraine with the active support of the chairman Pavlo Zahrebelnyi (1983.1986), in the gallery of "Or" (head M. Volga) and at the Museum of Folk Architecture and Folkways of Ukrainian SSR (1988). The exhibition in Kyiv House of Trade Unions gained wide publicity in 1990.

=== The film ===
In 1988, a talented director-operator Leonid Anichkin created a unique film about the life and work of the artist "Charmed wheel of life" (cinematographer A. Solopay, screenwriters V. Lysenko and Anatoly Cherchenko, composer Tatiana Lazarus-Dikareva). In the film, famous figures of Ukrainian culture have had their say about the work of Oles Semernya: Pavlo Zahrebelnyi, Yuri Pokalchuk, Ivan Malkovych, Valery Malina, Mykola Shcherbak, Oksana Zabuzhko, Valentin Lysenko, Roksana Horbovets.

=== Kyiv ===
In 1992, he carried out one of the most interesting collective presentation titled "Our roots and sources." Harmoniously united works of Volodymyr Kabachenko (Odesa), Fedir Panchuk (Vinnytsia), Oles Semernya (Mykolaiv – then he lived in Voznesensk) and Anatoly Furlet (Khmelnitsk Oblast).

In 1994, a group of Kyiv artists appealed to the Department of Culture of the Pechersk district administration with a proposal to turn Kostelna street, one of the streets of the Old Kyiv, into a street of arts. They received support and examined the non-residential premises which were extremely neglected. Consequently, the group won the tender on a competitive basis and made repairs as well as design on their own. In the result "Cultural and artistic center for Kostyolna" was set up consisting of 7 art galleries and 8 creative workshops. With gallery "Gryphon" Oles Semernya starts cooperation, exposing his works there.

In the summer of 1996, Semernya participated in the first International Art Festival, which took place in the Ukrainian House in Kyiv. The gallery "Griphon" with Semernya's works was nominated as the best out of 52 domestic and foreign galleries exhibition and was awarded the Grand Prix. At the same time he received an invitation from Harvard University to the exhibition in the United States. In 1996 works of Semernya were also presented in New York (Mission of Ukraine to the United Nations and at the Ukrainian Institute of America, Washington (Embassy of Ukraine in the USA), Philadelphia (in Ukrainian cultural center).

=== Cooperation with publishers ===
Starting from the 1990s, the artist collaborated with publishers. In 1991, the publishing of "Molod'" (Ukrainian for 'Youth') is working on a magazine "Sunflower" for primary school age – 1991, No. 2 . After becoming acquainted with Ivan Malkovich, he illustrated books for his publisher "A-BA-BA-HA-LA-MA-HA" – "Oh, you, cat Mark" (1993), "The Candle of the snow" .

=== Sokiryany ===
At the beginning of the third millennium Semernya returns to Ukraine and accidentally buys a house in Sokiryany in Bukovina. The artist got acquainted with the artists of Sokiryany in particular Valentyna Yarova, participated in regional exhibitions, in particular, at the Day of the artist, visited the regional center for children and youth. There he created the work "The Brotherhood", "Christmas", "Birthday", "Welcome", "Cossack Song", "Old man Moldovan", "Harvest", "Mother's Song". In 2007, an exhibition takes place at the Chernivtsi Regional Art Museum during which he presented 31 of his works written in the previous 20 years. In 2009, a solo artist exhibition dedicated to the 15th anniversary of the Foundation of the Moldovіan Ukrainian of Professional Artists and Craftsmen "Renaştere-Renaissance" called "Paleta Ucraineană a Moldovei – Ukrainian palette of Moldova" was held in Chisinau.

=== Review of publications ===
- In 2003, magazine "Ukrainian Culture" published articles by Ivan Malkovich "Cossack Mamai of Ukrainian painting" and Anatoly Bruce "The thrill of the soul"
- In 2006, published an article by A. Yaremchuk "From the pristine origins" dedicated to the 70th anniversary of the artist
- In 2007, I. F. Kitsul wrote a booklet for Chernivtsi Art Museum called "Oles Fedorovych Semernya" for the exhibition of works by the artist.
- In 2008, journal "Museum Lane" publishes a review of Nina Petrusovoi "Sokiryany Bukovina: Oles Semernya" .
- In 2011, V. Rokachuk, a senior researcher at the Institute of Cultural Heritage of the Academy of Sciences of Moldova, published the article "Everyday life in the Paintings of Alexander Semernya" on the website of the Kamianets-Podilskyi Ivan Ohienko National University.

=== Last years of life ===
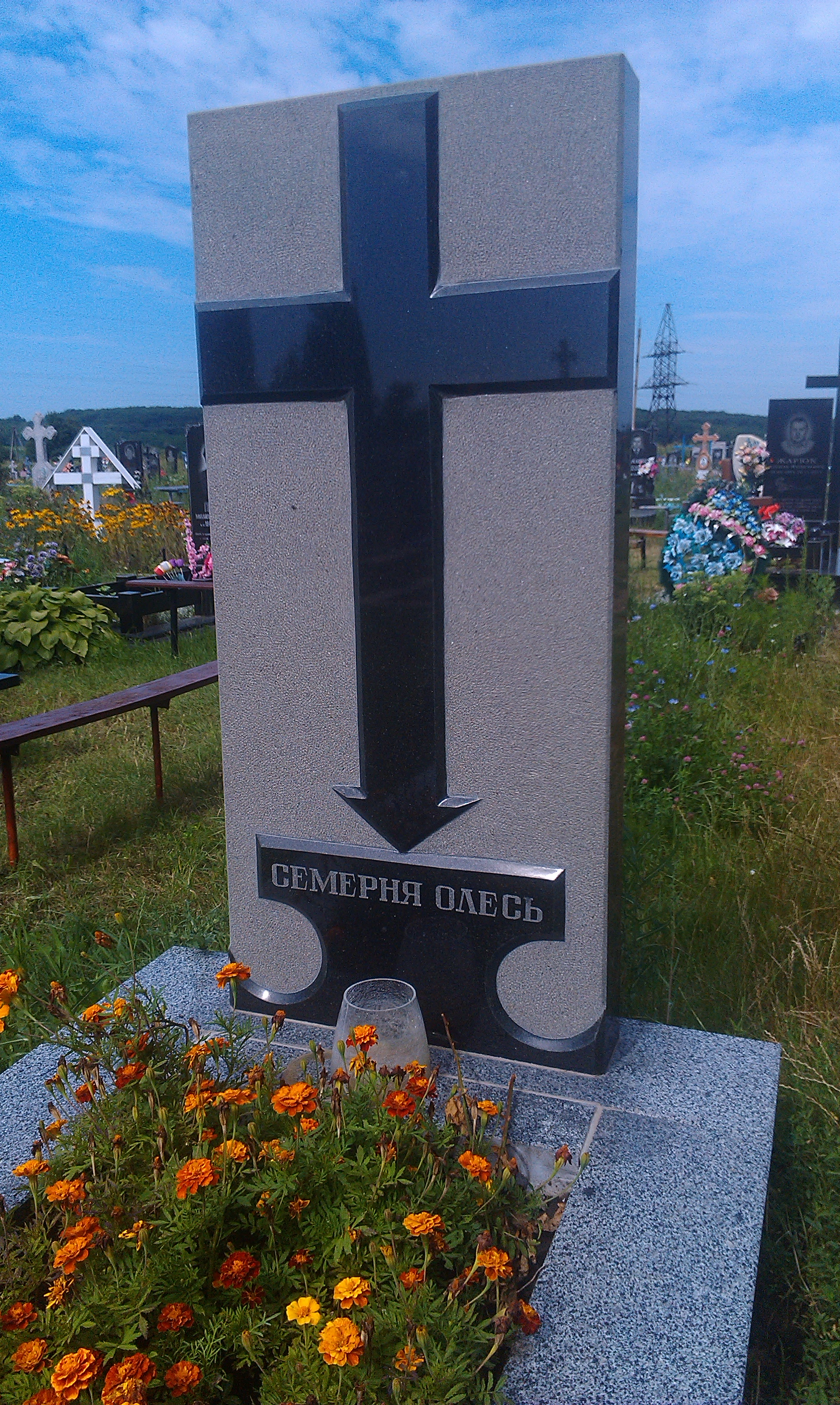
Semernya's tomb, Sokiryany

The artist was diagnosed with cancer, which he fought bravely. The latest solo exhibition of his work took place in the summer of 2011 in Kyiv gallery "Gryphon". For admirers of his talent it was a holiday, because Semernya had been recently operated, and the disease were not retreating. He worked as an artist until his death in his hut in the Bessarabian Sokiryany. Over the grave of Oles Semernya there is a cross, made by his own sketches.

== Philosophical views – "Cossack Mamay of Ukrainian art" ==
Oles Semernya is one of the most enigmatic creative figures of Ukraine. He was called a philosopher-recluse, because the artist lived in the countryside and worked there, abandoning public life. The artist explained that this style of life for him makes the whole world open up when he is in front of the easel for which he created a bright and colorful work on the themes of national life. For his freedom-loving life, paintings in naive art style Oles was nicknamed "Cossack Mamay of Ukrainian art."

== Legacy ==
After his death, a significant part of his paintings (70) has become the subject of a wide enjoyment of the human community. There are also Oles Semernya's works in private collections in 26 countries. In particular, Pavlo Zahrebelnyi, Oles Gonchar, Dmitro Pavlychko, Ivan Malkovich, Nicholas Volga and other prominent figures of Ukrainian culture have Semernyas works in their possetion. Artist's paintings can be also found in the following museums: the National Art Museum of Ukraine, Ukrainian Folk Art Museum, the Museum of Folk Life and Architecture (Pirohovo, Kyiv) and many others. Bukovina Society of the city, founded a Sokiryany museum of Oles Semernya in the house where he lived and worked as an artist.
