= Danylo Knyshuk =

Ukrainian sculptor (born 1978)

- Данило Книшук
- Born: Danylo Mykhailovych Knyshuk; 2 December 1978 (age 47); Kyiv, Ukrainian SSR
- Education: Ivano-Frankivsk University of Oil and Gas, National Academy of Visual Arts and Architecture
- Occupation: Sculptor

Danylo Mykhailovych Knyshuk (Ukrainian: Данило Михайлович Книшук, born 2 December 1978, Kyiv, Ukrainian SSR) is a Ukrainian sculptor.

== Biography ==
Knyshuk studied at the Ivano-Frankivsk Art School and Ivano-Frankivsk Physical and Technical Lyceum. He attended both Ivano-Frankivsk University of Oil and Gas and the National Academy of Visual Arts and Architecture, the latter of which he attained a degree from in 2012.

Since 2000, he has been working as an artist.

== Selected works ==
- The Vidomi postati Ukrainy Project, which includes busts of Panteleimon Kulish, Lesya Ukrainka, Ivan Franko, Andrey Sheptytsky, Ivan Marchuk, Yevhen Stankovych, Valentyn Silvestrov, Myroslav Skoryk, Bohdan Kozak, Liubomyr Huzar, Myroslav Popovych, Stepan Pushyk, Lina Kostenko, Ivan Malkovych, Dmytro Pavlychko, Bohdan Stupka, Vasyl Lomachenko, Volodymyr Klychko, Les Zadniprovskyi, Valerii Kozlov, Serhii Zhadan, Ostap Stupka, Dmytro Tkachenko, Oleksandr Pecherytsia, Svitlana Stoian, Tetiana Oleksenko-Zhyrko, Nataliia Yaroshenko, Pavlo Piskun, Oleh Vynohradov, Ihor Rudnyk, Nina Skochko, and Vasyl Yakymovych
- Statue of Taras Shevchenko and the Heavenly Hundred in Obertyn (2016)
- Model of the statue of St. Pope John Paul II in Ivano-Frankivsk (2012)
- Sculptures of St. Nicholas in Tyshkivtsi, Horodenka Raion
- Sculpture of St. Anne in Peremyshliany
- Statues of the Blessed Virgin Mary and Jesus Christ

Personal exhibitions of Knyshuk's work were held in Ivano-Frankivsk (2019, 2020), Halych (2021), Lviv (2021, 2022, 2023), and Vynnyky (2022).
