= Notes of a Ukrainian Madman =

Novel by Lina Kostenko

- Author: Lina Kostenko
- Original title: Записки українського самашедшого
- Illustrator: Vladyslav Yerko
- Cover artist: Rafał Olbiński (Manon Pelleas et Melisande)
- Language: Ukrainian
- Genre: Novel
- Published: 2010
- Publisher: А-БА-БА-ГА-ЛА-МА-ГА
- Publication place: Ukraine
- Media type: Hard cover
- Pages: 416
- ISBN: 978-966-7047-88-7
- Preceded by: Selected Works (1989)
- Followed by: Notes of the Ukrainian self-made man (2010)

Notes of a Ukrainian Madman (Ukrainian: «Записки українського самашедшого») is the first novel by Ukrainian poet Lina Kostenko. It was published in 2010, and was the first new book by Kostenko in 20 years.

The book shows Ukrainian politics and daily life of ordinary Ukrainians through the diary of a 35-year-old Ukrainian programmer. The book starts ironically and pessimistically during the end of Leonid Kuchma's presidency, and ends optimistically during the Orange Revolution.

The book contains the observation that "all nations suffer from certain pathologies; Russia's are incurable".

The book became a Ukrainian bestseller, with around 100,000 sales in the first six months.

== Background ==
Lina Kostenko was predominantly famous as a poet, and the book became her first experience in the genre of prose novel. Also it was her first new book since about 1987. Lina Kostenko was writing the Notes for almost 10 years.

The book design was created by artist Vladislav Yerko. The cover uses a picture by Polish artist Rafał Olbiński (Manon Pelleas et Melisande).

The first edition went on sale December 17, 2010, and comprised 10,000 copies. It was rapidly sold out, and the new edition appeared in bookshops January 18, 2011. As of June 2011, the publisher estimated the total official sales to be 80 thousand copies, as well as 20 or 30 thousand issued by pirates.

The book includes numerous allusions to and direct quotes from books by Nikolai Gogol, and from The Master and Margarita by Mikhail Bulgakov. The name of the novel itself is a reminiscence of Gogol's Diary of a Madman.

== Plot summary ==
The novel describes the period of Leonid Kuchma's presidency and the Orange Revolution. The protagonist of the novel is a 35-year-old programmer. He met his future wife during the student protests of 1990 in favor of Ukraine's independence. His father, a famous translator and a sixtier, has a new wife and a young introverted son that appears in the novel under the nickname Teenager. The wife of the protagonist is a linguist studying Nikolai Gogol. The protagonist's son studies at school and befriends his neighbor Boris, the son of a new Ukrainian.

The protagonist writes so-called "Notes", where he keeps track of all catastrophes, assassinations and scandals, of which he learns from the news. Thus he tries to channel his emotions, to describe his attitude to the corrupt Kuchma regime and avoid slipping into complete cynicism. In parallel, the notes reflect the sometimes problematic relationship of the protagonist with his wife. The notes start in an ironic, pessimistic, skeptical, even mocking tone, but at the end the tone changes dramatically, as the protagonist goes through the emotionally intense events of the Orange Revolution.

== See also ==
- List of Ukrainian-language poets
- List of Ukrainian-language writers
- Ukrainian literature
