= Diary of a Madman (Gogol short story) =

Short story by Nikolai Gogol

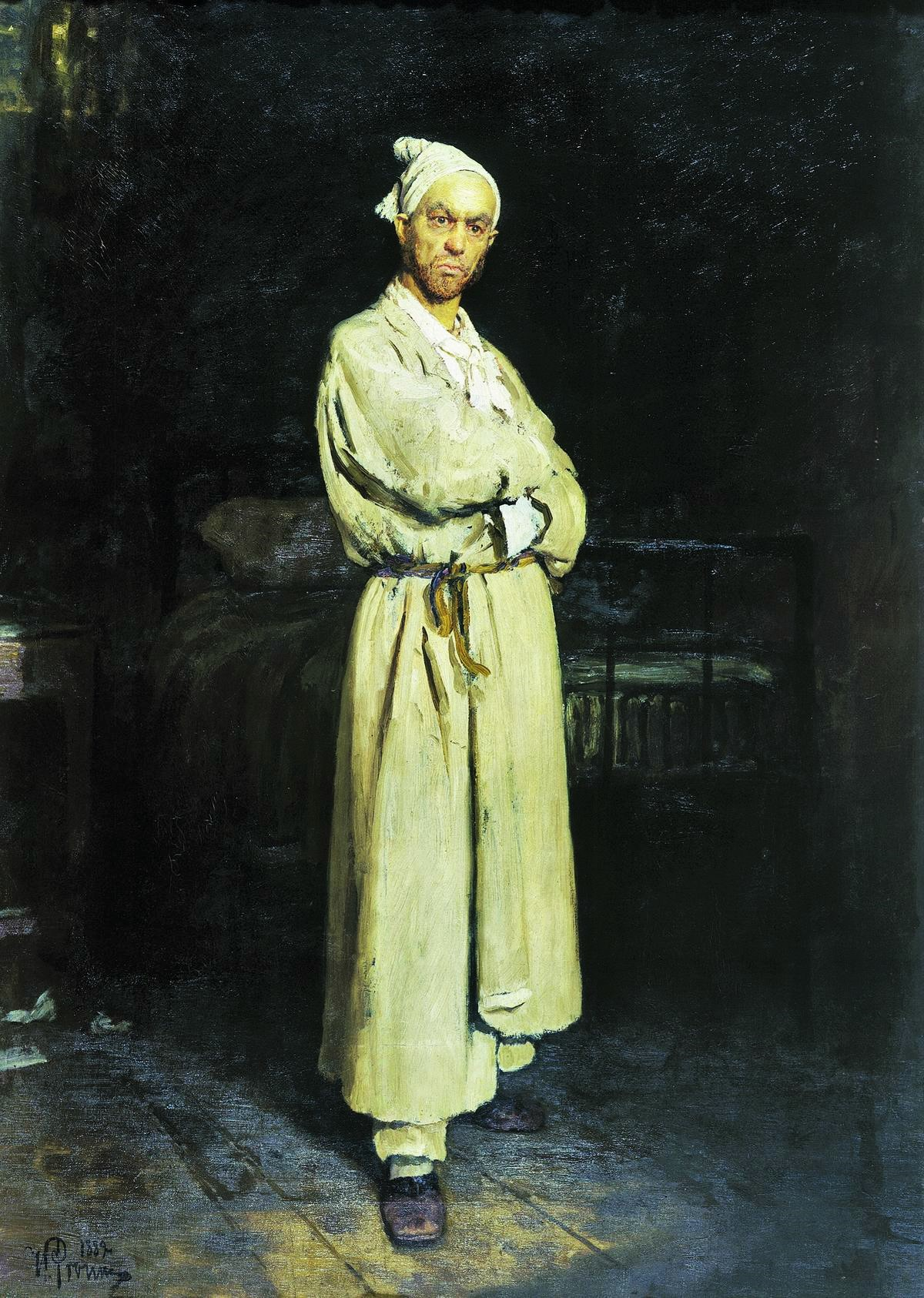
Poprishchin. Painting by Ilya Repin (1882)

"Diary of a Madman" (Russian: Записки сумасшедшего, Zapiski sumasshedshevo) is a farcical short story by Nikolai Gogol first published in 1835. Along with "The Overcoat" and "The Nose", "Diary of a Madman" is considered to be one of Gogol's greatest short stories. The tale centers on the life of a minor civil servant during the era of Nicholas I. The story shows the descent of the protagonist, Poprishchin, into insanity. "Diary of a Madman", the only one of Gogol's works written in first person, follows diary-entry format.

== Plot introduction ==
Although nineteenth-century medical authorities noted the accuracy of Gogol's depiction of the course of madness, the text itself (with the exception of the title) never crosses the boundary into objectification. Everything is told exclusively from the point of view of the protagonist, and conclusions about him and what is happening to him can only ever be inferred from the solipsistic and increasingly fantastic narrative of events and thoughts recorded in his diary. The entries haphazardly mix a past tense recounting of events of the day with present time registering of thoughts and associations relating to them. It begins with a standard date-based diary format, but at a certain point even the dates take on an irrational form, as if the writer's sense of conventional time has dissolved.

== Plot summary ==
=== October 3rd ===
Poprishchin is reluctant to go to the office, believing that the chief clerk is envious of his position as the mender of pens. He goes, however, to obtain an advance on his salary, despite knowing that the accountant would not oblige.

Outside a shop, he encounters Sophie, the director's daughter, and is smitten. He hears her dog Meggie engaging in conversation with another dog, Fidel, and recalls hearing about a fish and two cows who spoke. After Meggie mentions she has written Fidel a letter, Poprishchin resolves to follow Fidel and her owner to ascertain their address.

=== October 4th ===
Sophie enters Poprishchin's office, where he is mending pens. He longs to tell Sophie not to have him executed but to kill him with her own hand, but instead says that the director is not there. She drops her handkerchief and he nearly breaks his nose trying to retrieve it. That evening, he waits outside the director's house, hoping to see her, but she does not appear.

=== November 6th ===
The chief clerk insults Poprishchin for running after Sophie.

=== November 8th ===
Poprishchin enjoys a musical comedy at the theatre.

=== November 9th ===
Poprishchin and the chief clerk pretend not to notice each other in the office. He passes by the director's house on the way home, but sees no-one.

=== November 11th ===
Poprishchin mends pens for the director and Sophie. Remembering the conversation between the dogs, he decides he must get ahold of the letters. He demands information from Meggie about Sophie, but the dog leaves the room without saying anything.

=== November 12th ===
At Fidel's home, Poprishchin tells the girl he wishes to speak to the dog. The dog comes barking, and when he tries to pick it up, it attempts to bite him. However, he succeeds in snatching papers from the dog's sleeping basket before fleeing.

=== November 13th ===
Poprishchin records verbatim the contents of Meggie's letters to Fidel. Despite being legible and grammatically correct, the letters are largely concerned with canine matters rather than the director or his daughter. However, he learns that Sophie attended a ball and received a gentleman visitor called Teploff, and that Sophie finds Poprishchin an object of ridicule. Enraged, Poprishchin accuses the dog of lying and being motivated by envy. He also learns that Sophie loves Teploff, that they are engaged, and that her father is happy about it.

=== December 3rd ===
Poprishchin cannot accept that the marriage will take place. He wonders if he himself is only a titular councillor and speculates that he might really be a count or a general.

=== December 5th ===
Poprishchin reads in the newspapers that the throne of Spain is vacant and that the next monarch may be a woman.

=== December 8th ===
Poprishchin is troubled by the Spanish affairs. He feels "shaken and shattered" and drops two plates at dinner. Later, he feels weak and lies in bed.

=== The year 2000: April 43rd ===
Poprishchin announces that the King of Spain has been found and that it is himself. He cannot understand how he could have imagined he was a councillor, but thinks it might have been due to his thinking the human brain is in the head when in fact it is carried by the wind from the Caspian Sea. His maidservant, Mawra, is shocked when he mentions that he is the King of Spain. He does not go to the office.

=== Marchember 86. Between day and night ===
Poprishchin is summoned to the office after three weeks absence. He sits at his work but ignores it. When the director gives him a document to sign, he signs "Ferdinand VIII" and is met with silence. He leaves and forces his way into the director's house. In Sophie's dressing room, he tells a frightened Sophie that at last they will be united and that unimaginable happiness awaits her. He then departs.

=== No date. The day had no date ===
Poprishchin goes for a walk "incognito", feeling it beneath his dignity to be recognized in the world when he has not yet presented at court. He decides that he needs a royal cloak and that the tailors are incompetent for the task. He makes the cloak out of his office uniform and startles Mawra in it.

=== The 1st ===
Poprishchin is astonished at the delay of the Spanish deputies. He goes to the post office to inquire after them, and the postmaster tells him he would be happy to forward a letter for Poprishchin if desired.

=== Madrid. February 30th ===
Poprishchin claims to be in Spain, where the Spanish deputies have transported him to the Spanish frontier. He enters a building and sees many persons with shaved heads and decides they must be grandees or soldiers. The "Chancellor" pushes him into a room and threatens to beat him if he calls himself Ferdinand VIII again, but Poprishchin repeats his claim and is beaten. He believes it is an ancient chivalric ceremony for those inducted into high office. Later, he declares that Spain and China are the same country. He also becomes deeply troubled by the impending collision of Earth and the moon. He convinces the "grandees with shorn heads" to help save the moon, but the Chancellor beats him and drives him into his room.

=== January in the same year, following after February ===
Poprishchin is insulted that they have shaved his head and washed it with cold water. He fears he may have fallen into the hands of the Inquisition and that the Chancellor is in fact the Grand Inquisitor.

=== The 25th ===
Poprishchin hides in his room from the Grand Inquisitor, who calls out his name and official title before calling out "Ferdinand the Eighth, King of Spain". Poprishchin responds and is beaten before discovering that "every cock has his Spain under his feathers".

=== 34 March. February 349 ===
Poprishchin can no longer endure the torture and humiliation, and he cries out for help. He prays to his mother, concluding with the words:

Mother, mother, have pity on your sick child! And do you know that the Dey of Algiers has a wart under his nose?

== Themes ==
=== Madness ===
Gogol evokes common images of madness in his characterization of Poprishchin – auditory hallucination (the talking dogs), delusions of grandeur (thinking he is the King of Spain), and the institutional context of the asylum and its effect on the individual. In the second half of the nineteenth century, "Diary of a Madman" was frequently cited as a realistic case study: medical specialists wrote articles confirming its authenticity as an outline of the progress of paranoid delusion. The character has been described by psychiatrist Eric Lewin Altschuler as one of the earliest and most extensive depictions of what became known as schizophrenia. The image of the insane asylum as a house of correction, indirectly presented through Poprishchin's deranged diary entries, is also true to ideological perspectives and institutional practices pertaining to the treatment of madness in the era of European industrialization.

Poprishchin's descent into madness is a result of his alienation from society. His desire to achieve the dignity and authority that he sees around him, but never feels, yields frustration rather than motivation. His lack of motivation causes Poprishchin to wish for power and wealth, instead of actively trying to work toward achieving this goal in reality.

Poprishchin's relationship with three specific characters, the Director, the Section Chief and Sophie, contribute significantly to the disintegration of his sanity. The Section Chief causes Poprishchin the most direct frustration through constant criticism. Poprishchin responds to the Section Chief's attempts to bring him into reality with anger and aggression. The Director takes a much more passive role in affecting Poprishchin. Poprishchin actually idolizes the Director, in large part due to the fact that he remains distant from Poprishchin and never interferes in his personal life with comments or suggestions. Despite this initially peaceful relationship, Poprishchin finds a way to see a menace in the Director. Poprishchin notices that the Director has too much ambition, a quality that Poprishchin desires, but knows he cannot achieve in reality, and therefore turns his admiration of the Director into hatred. Sophie is a beautiful woman to whom Poprishchin has a strong sexual attraction. However, Poprishchin painfully discovers that Sophie finds him unattractive and irritable, and he is unable to cope. Poprishchin is enlightened about both the Director's ambition and Sophie's view of him from letters written by a dog. Poprishchin's imagination conjured the complimentary letter from Sophie when, in reality, the letter neglects mentioning him. His destruction of the letter evidences his insanity by symbolizing his release of reality.

=== Alienation ===
One disruptive force contextualized is the relationship between the individual and society. Poprishchin sees a menace in everyone and always finds a way to blame others for his personal frustrations, and consequently treats them with the aggression he believes they deserve. This behavior fuels a vicious cycle that justifies the negative perception and treatment that society exerts toward Poprishchin.

=== Numbers ===
There have been many analyses of Poprishchin's unique diary entries attempting to interpret their meaning, with special interest taken in the entry: 43 April 2000. A Freudian analysis performed by Ermakov hypothesized that Poprishchin used this absurd date to avoid May 13, because the word maja suggests majat'sja, which in Russian means suffering. Richard Gustafson's analysis of the entry title is more grounded in the contents of the story. He agrees that Poprishchin is indeed trying to avoid May 13, but his reasoning is that the letters from the dogs that exposed the grave reality of Sofi and the Director were presented exactly half a year earlier on November 13.

== Legacy ==
Chinese writer Lu Xun was well acquainted with Russian literature and wrote a story with a similar title as Gogol's in 1918.

The story's name was reflected in Lina Kostenko's novel Notes of a Ukrainian Madman, which makes frequent references to Gogol's writings.

The Malayalam novel Oru Malayali Bhranthante Diary by N. Prabhakaran (translated as Diary of a Malayali Madman by Jayasree Kalathil) mentions Gogol's story in its first chapter.

== Adaptations ==
On December 19, 1964, the story was adapted by Erik Bauersfeld for the radio series The Black Mass. This adaptation was later rebroadcast in 1987 in two parts on the radio series Tales from the Shadows.

In 1968, the story was adaptated to film under the title Sofi, directed by Robert G. Carlisle and written by Don Eitner and Tom Troupe, with Tom Troupe as the only actor.

Martin Donegan recorded the story in 1969 for CMS Records (CMS-536).

Kenneth Williams recorded Nikolai Gogol's story in 1961 for an animated film by Richard Williams which was never completed. On 03 February 1991, the audio recording was broadcast on BBC Radio 4.

In 2001, the story was adapted by Elliott Hayes for CBC Radio and performed by Stephen Ouimette before a live audience at the Glenn Gould Studio in Toronto.

On 1 May 2002, Griff Rhys-Jones starred in a BBC Radio 4 dramatization by Jim Poyser as an episode of the comedy series Three Ivans, Two Aunts and an Overcoat.

David Holman adapted the story into a play; the 2010 production in Sydney (later at the Brooklyn Academy of Music in New York City) starred Geoffrey Rush.
