= List of awards and nominations received by Geoffrey Rush =

Geoffrey Rush awards and nominations
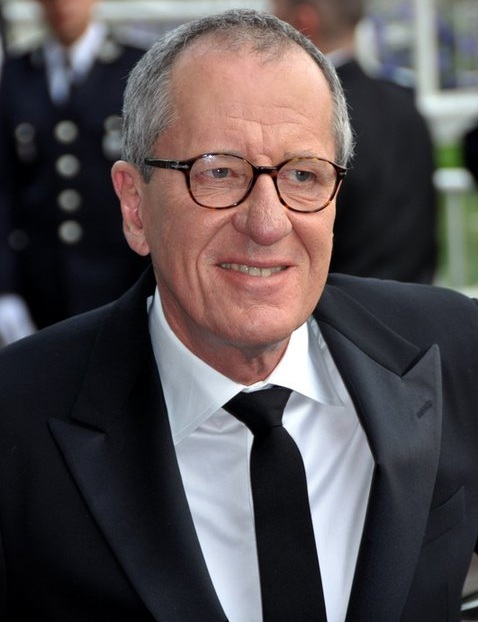
- Rush at the 2011 Cannes Film Festival
Awards and nominations
Award	Wins	Nominations
Academy Awards	1	4
Actor Awards	4	9
BAFTA Awards	3	5
Critics Choice	1	3
Emmy Awards	1	2
Golden Globes	2	6
Tony Awards	1	1

Totals (Note: Certain award groups do not simply award one winner. They acknowledge several different recipients, have runners-up, and have third place. Since this is a specific recognition and is different from losing an award, runner-up mentions are considered wins in this award tally. For simplification and to avoid errors, each award in this list has been presumed to have had a prior nomination.)
- Wins: 10
- Nominations: 20

Geoffrey Rush is an Australian actor of the stage and screen. He has received what is known as the Triple Crown of Acting, meaning an Academy Award, Tony Award and Primetime Emmy Awards, which represent film, theatre and television respectively. Over his career he has also received four Actor Awards, three British Academy Film Awards, a Critics' Choice Movie Award, and two Golden Globe Awards. Rush is the founding president of the Australian Academy of Cinema and Television Arts and was named the 2012 Australian of the Year.

Rush received the Academy Award for Best Actor for his portrayal of pianist David Helfgott in the biographical film Shine (1996). He was Oscar-nominated for playing Philip Henslowe in the romantic period film Shakespeare in Love (1998), the Marquis de Sade in the period drama Quills (2000), and Lionel Logue in the historical drama The King's Speech (2010). He won the BAFTA Award for Best Actor in a Leading Role, the Golden Globe Award for Best Actor in a Motion Picture – Drama, and the Screen Actors Guild Award for Outstanding Performance by a Male Actor in a Leading Role for Shine. He also won the BAFTA Awards for Shakespeare in Love (1998), and The King's Speech (2010).

For his work in television he received Primetime Emmy Award for Outstanding Lead Actor in a Limited Series or Movie, the Golden Globe Award for Best Actor – Miniseries or Television Film, and the Screen Actors Guild Award for Outstanding Performance by a Male Actor in a Miniseries or Television Movie for his performance as Peter Sellers in the HBO film The Life and Death of Peter Sellers (2003). Rush was nominated for the Primetime Emmy Award, Golden Globe Award, and Screen Actors Guild Award for Outstanding Actor in a Limited Series or Movie for his portrayal of theoretical physicist Albert Einstein in the National Geographic anthology miniseries Genius (2017).

On stage, Rush received the Tony Award for Best Actor in a Play for his performance as King Berenger in the French absurdist comedy Exit the King (2009). For his roles in theatre he also received a Drama Desk Award, an Outer Critics Circle Award, and two Helpmann Awards. He was nominated for the Drama Desk Award for Outstanding Actor in a Play for playing Poprishchin in the Russian farce Diary of a Madman (2011).

== Major associations ==
=== Academy Awards ===
Year	Category	Nominated work	Result	Ref.
1997	Best Actor	Shine	Won	
1999	Best Supporting Actor	Shakespeare in Love	Nominated	
2001	Best Actor	Quills	Nominated	
2011	Best Supporting Actor	The King's Speech	Nominated	

=== Actor Awards ===
Year	Category	Nominated work	Result	Ref.
1997	Outstanding Male Actor in a Leading Role	Shine	Won	
1997	Outstanding Cast in a Motion Picture	Shine	Nominated	
1999	Outstanding Male Actor in a Supporting Role	Shakespeare in Love	Nominated	
1999	Outstanding Cast in a Motion Picture	Shakespeare in Love	Won	
2001	Outstanding Male Actor in a Leading Role	Quills	Nominated	
2005	Outstanding Male Actor in a Miniseries or TV Movie	The Life and Death of Peter Sellers	Won	
2011	Outstanding Male Actor in a Supporting Role	The King's Speech	Nominated	
2011	Outstanding Cast in a Motion Picture	The King's Speech	Won	
2018	Outstanding Male Actor in Miniseries or TV Movie	Genius	Nominated	

=== BAFTA Awards ===
Year	Category	Nominated work	Result	Ref.
British Academy Film Awards
1997	Best Actor in a Leading Role	Shine	Won	
1999	Best Actor in a Supporting Role	Elizabeth	Nominated	
1999	Best Actor in a Supporting Role	Shakespeare in Love	Won	
2001	Best Actor in a Leading Role	Quills	Nominated	
2011	Best Actor in a Supporting Role	The King's Speech	Won	

=== Critics' Choice Awards ===
Year	Category	Nominated work	Result	Ref.
Critics' Choice Movie Awards
1996	Best Actor	Shine	Won	
2000	Best Actor	Quills	Nominated	
2010	Best Supporting Actor	The Kings Speech	Nominated	

=== Emmy Award ===
Year	Category	Nominated work	Result	Ref.
Primetime Emmy Awards
2005	Outstanding Lead Actor in a Limited Series or Movie	The Life and Death of Peter Sellers	Won	
2017	Outstanding Lead Actor in a Limited Series or Movie	Genius	Nominated	

=== Golden Globe Awards ===
Year	Category	Nominated work	Result	Ref.
1997	Best Actor in a Motion Picture – Drama	Shine	Won	
1999	Best Supporting Actor – Motion Picture	Shakespeare in Love	Nominated	
2001	Best Actor in a Motion Picture – Drama	Quills	Nominated	
2005	Best Actor in a Miniseries or Motion Picture – Television	The Life and Death of Peter Sellers	Won	
2011	Best Supporting Actor – Motion Picture	The King's Speech	Nominated	
2018	Best Actor in a Miniseries or Motion Picture – Television	Genius	Nominated	

=== Tony Award ===
Year	Category	Nominated work	Result	Ref.
2009	Best Actor in a Play	Exit the King	Won	

== Other theatre awards ==
Organizations	Year	Category	Work	Result	Ref.
Drama Desk Award	2009	Outstanding Actor in a Play	Exit the King	Won	
Drama Desk Award	2011	Outstanding Actor in a Play	Diary of a Madman	Nominated	
Outer Critics Circle Award	2009	Outstanding Actor in a Play	Exit the King	Won	
Helpmann Award	2001	Best Male Actor in a Play	The Small Poppies	Nominated	
Helpmann Award	2008	Best Male Actor in a Play	Exit the King	Nominated	
Helpmann Award	2010	Best Male Actor in a Musical	The Drowsy Chaperone	Nominated	
Helpmann Award	2011	Best Male Actor in a Play	Diary of a Madman	Won	
Helpmann Award	2013	Best Male Actor in a Musical	A Funny Thing Happened on the Way to the Forum	Won	

== Miscellaneous associations ==
Organizations	Year	Category	Work	Result	Ref.
Australian Academy Film Awards	1996	Best Actor in a Leading Role	Shine	Won	
Australian Academy Film Awards	1998	Best Actor in a Supporting Role	A Little Bit of Soul	Nominated	
Australian Academy Film Awards	2002	Best Actor in a Leading Role	Swimming Upstream	Nominated	
Australian Academy Film Awards	2006	Best Actor in a Supporting Role	Candy	Nominated	
Australian Academy Film Awards	2011	Best Actor in a Leading Role	The Eye of the Storm	Nominated	
Annie Awards	2012	Outstanding Voice Acting in a Feature Production	Legend of the Guardians: The Owls of Ga'Hoole	Nominated	
Mo Awards	2006	Actor in Play	Geoffrey Rush	Won	

== Honorary awards ==
Organizations	Year	Award	Result	Ref.
Sidney Myer Performing Arts Awards	1993	Statue	Honored	
University of Queensland	1998	Bachelor of Arts, Honorary Doctorate	Honored	
the Queen's New Year's Honours List	2001	Australian Centenary Medal	Honored	
Australian Film Institute Award	2003	Global Achievement Award	Honored	
Brisbane International Film Festival	2004	Chauvel Award	Honored	
American Film Institute	2009	Longford Life Achievement Award	Honored	
Santa Barbara International Film Festival	2011	Montecito Award	Honored	
Australian Academy of Cinema and Television Arts	2012	Australian of the Year	Honored	
Companion of the Order of Australia (AC)	2014	Medal	Honored	
the Karlovy Vary International Film Festival	2022	Outstanding Artistic Contribution to World Cinema	Honored	

Cultural offices
New title	President of the Australian Academy of Cinema and Television Arts; 2011–2017	Succeeded by vacant
Awards and achievements
Preceded by Simon McKeon	Australian of the Year; 2012	Succeeded by Ita Buttrose
