= Geoffrey Rush =

Australian actor (born 1951)

Geoffrey Rush AC
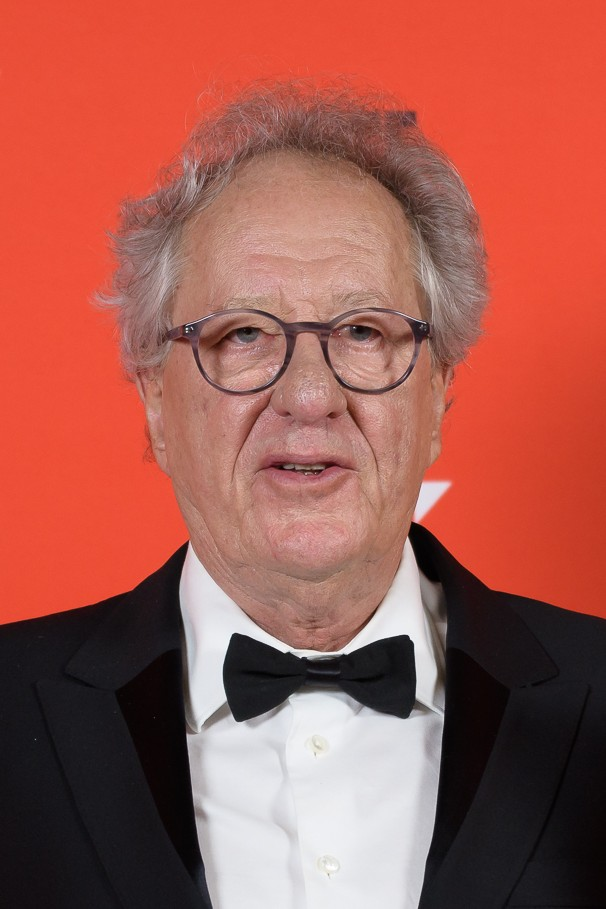
- Rush in 2023
- Born: Geoffrey Roy Rush; 6 July 1951 (age 75); Toowoomba, Queensland, Australia
- Education: University of Queensland (BA); L'École Internationale de Théatre Jacques Lecoq
- Occupations: Actor; film producer; composer
- Years active: 1971–present
- Spouse: Jane Menelaus (m. 1988)
- Children: 2
- Awards: Full list
- Geoffrey Rush's voice from the BBC programme Front Row, 1 May 2013

Geoffrey Roy Rush (born 6 July 1951) is an Australian actor. Known for often playing eccentric roles on both stage and screen, he has received numerous accolades, including an Academy Award, a Primetime Emmy Award and a Tony Award, making him the only Australian to achieve the Triple Crown of Acting, in addition to three BAFTAs and two Golden Globe Awards. Rush is the founding president of the Australian Academy of Cinema and Television Arts and was named the 2012 Australian of the Year.

Rush began his professional acting career with the Queensland Theatre Company in 1971. He studied for two years at the L'École Internationale de Théâtre Jacques Lecoq starting in 1975. Rush starred in international productions of Oleanna, Waiting for Godot, The Winter's Tale and The Importance of Being Earnest. He made his Broadway debut in the absurdist comedy Exit the King in 2009 earning the Tony Award for Best Actor in a Play. He received a nomination for Drama Desk Award for Outstanding Actor in a Play for Diary of a Madman in 2011.

Rush won the Academy Award for Best Actor for his portrayal of David Helfgott in the drama Shine (1996). He was Oscar-nominated for playing Philip Henslowe in Shakespeare in Love (1998), the Marquis de Sade in Quills (2000), and Lionel Logue in The King's Speech (2010). He played Captain Hector Barbossa in the Pirates of the Caribbean franchise (2003–2017), and Francis Walsingham in Elizabeth (1998) and its 2007 sequel. He also acted in Les Misérables (1998), Frida (2002), Finding Nemo (2003), Intolerable Cruelty (2003), Munich (2005), and The Book Thief (2013).

On television, Rush portrayed Peter Sellers in the HBO television film The Life and Death of Peter Sellers (2004) which earned him the Primetime Emmy Award, the Actor Award and the Golden Globe Award for Best Lead Actor in a Limited Series. He later was Emmy-nominated for his portrayal of scientist Albert Einstein in National Geographic anthology series Genius (2017).

== Early life and education ==
Geoffrey Roy Rush was born on 6 July 1951 in Toowoomba, Queensland, the son of Merle (Bischof), a department store sales assistant, and Roy Baden Rush, an accountant for the Royal Australian Air Force. His father was of English, Irish, and Scottish ancestry, and his mother was of German descent. He has an older sister. His parents divorced when he was five, and his mother subsequently took him to live with her parents in suburban Brisbane. Before he began his acting career, Rush attended Everton Park State High School, and graduated from the University of Queensland with a bachelor's degree in Arts. While at university, he was talent-spotted by Queensland Theatre Company (QTC) in Brisbane. Rush began his career with QTC in 1971, appearing in 17 productions.

In 1975, Rush went to Paris for two years and studied mime, movement and theatre at L'École Internationale de Théâtre Jacques Lecoq. While at Lecoq, Rush trained under infamous master clown Philippe Gaulier. Afterwards he returned to Brisbane, where he continued to work at QTC. In 1979, he shared an apartment with actor Mel Gibson for four months while they co-starred in a stage production of Waiting for Godot.

== Career ==
=== 1979–1995: Rise to prominence ===
Rush made his theatre debut in the QTC's production of Wrong Side of the Moon. He worked with the QTC for four years, appearing in roles ranging across classical plays and pantomime, from Juno and the Paycock to Hamlet on Ice. Following these, Rush left for Paris where he studied further.

Rush appears in a 1980 documentary film about Australian fringe theatre narrated by Spike Milligan, called Amazing Scenes. In it, he performs with a group called "Clowneroonies".

Rush made his film debut in the Australian film Hoodwink in 1981. His next film was Gillian Armstrong's Starstruck, the following year. Rush's acting credits include William Shakespeare's plays The Winter's Tale (with the State Theatre Company of South Australia in 1987 at The Playhouse in Adelaide) and Troilus and Cressida (at the Old Museum Building in 1989). He also appeared in an ongoing production of Oscar Wilde's The Importance of Being Earnest as John Worthing (Ernest) (in which his wife, Jane Menelaus, appeared as Gwendolen).

In the 1990s Rush appeared in small roles on television dramas, including a role as a dentist in a 1993 episode of the British television series Lovejoy. Rush starred opposite Cate Blanchett in a production of David Mamet's two-character play Oleanna (1993) at the Sydney Theatre Company. It was Blanchett's first major role after graduating from Sydney's National Institute of Dramatic Arts. Rush played a university professor entangled with a student played by Blanchett. She described the role as a "seminal one for [her], which hit the world at that time, making it electric." She also described Rush as a mentor to her. Rush also continued his work in theatre. In 1994, Rush played Horatio in a production of Hamlet alongside Richard Roxburgh, Jacqueline McKenzie and David Wenham in the Company B production at the Belvoir St Theatre in Sydney.

=== 1996–2002: Breakthrough and acclaim ===
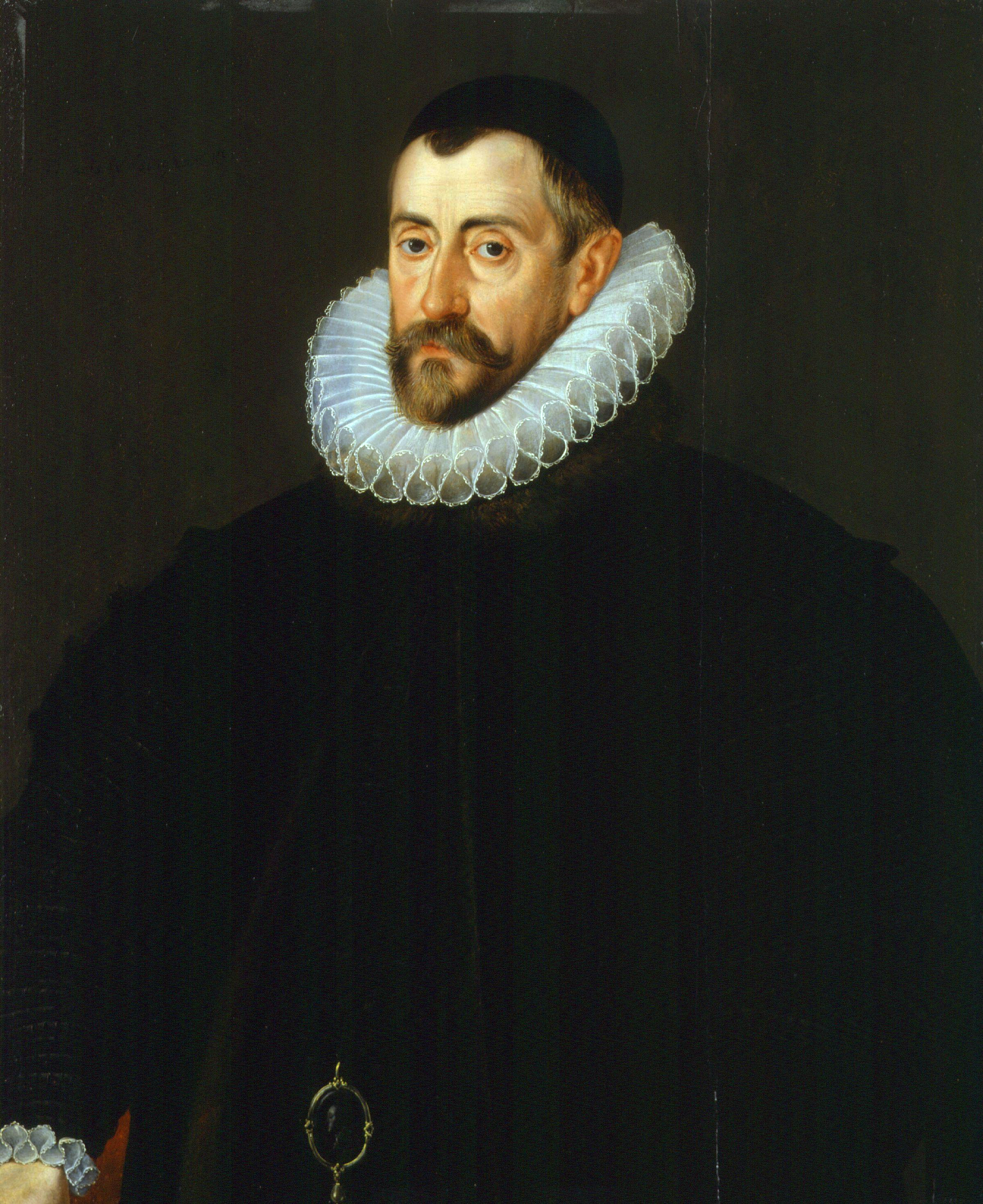
Rush portrayed Sir Francis Walsingham in Elizabeth (1998)

Rush made his film breakthrough with his performance in 1996 with Shine, for which he won the Academy Award for Best Actor. Rush had once learned piano up until aged fourteen and retook piano lessons again thirty years later for the role, choosing to perform most of the piano playing himself rather than using a hand double. That same year, James L. Brooks flew him to Los Angeles to audition for the part of Simon Bishop in As Good as It Gets and offered him the role, but Rush declined it (it went to Greg Kinnear). In September 1998, Rush played the title role in the Beaumarchais play The Marriage of Figaro for the QTC. This was the opening production of the Optus Playhouse at the Queensland Performing Arts Centre at South Bank in Brisbane. A pun on Rush's name (and the circumstances) was used in the opening prologue of the play with the comment that the "Optus Playhouse was opening with a Rush".

In 1998, he appeared in three major costume dramas. He played Javert opposite Liam Neeson as Jean Valjean in Les Misérables. The film directed by Bille August was an adaptation of the Victor Hugo novel of the same name. Uma Thurman and Claire Danes also acted in the film. He also portrayed Sir Francis Walsingham alongside fellow Australian Cate Blanchett as Queen Elizabeth I in the historical drama Elizabeth. He received a BAFTA Award for Best Actor in a Supporting Role nomination for his performance. Finally Rush portrayed Philip Henslowe in the romantic comedy-drama Shakespeare in Love acting opposite Joseph Fiennes, Gwyneth Paltrow, Colin Firth, Tom Wilkinson, and Judi Dench. For his performance he received nominations for Best Supporting Actor from the Academy Awards, British Academy Film Awards, Golden Globe Awards, and Screen Actors Guild Awards. In 1999, Rush took the lead role as Steven Price in the horror film House on Haunted Hill, and played the villain in the superhero comedy film Mystery Men.

In 2000, Rush starred in Philip Kaufman's Quills where he played the Marquis de Sade alongside Kate Winslet, Joaquin Phoenix and Michael Caine. The film was written by Tony Award winning playwright Doug Wright who adapted the film's screenplay from his play. Rush received widespread critical acclaim for his performance with Rolling Stone critic Peter Travers' describing his performance as "volcanic", and "scandalously good". For his performance in the film he received his third Oscar nomination this time for Best Actor. Rush's career continued at a fast pace, with nine films released from 2001 to 2003. In 2002, Rush played Leon Trotsky to Salma Hayek's Frida Kahlo in Julie Taymor's Frida. In the reaction to the #MeToo Movement, Hayek wrote an opinion piece in The New York Times detailing the harassment Harvey Weinstein perpetrated against her. In the article she wrote about her determination to make the movie and praised Rush as a collaborator and for agreeing to act in the film.

=== 2003–2011: Established actor ===
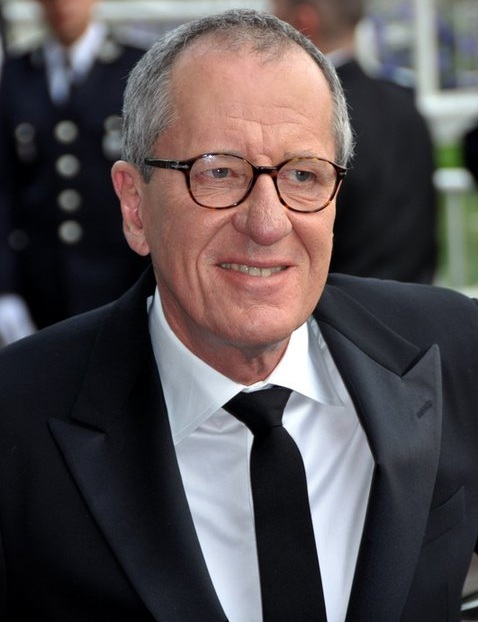
Rush at the 2011 Cannes Film Festival

Rush appeared in several films released in 2003. He played Superintendent Francis Hare in Ned Kelly with Heath Ledger, Orlando Bloom and Naomi Watts. He voiced Nigel the brown pelican in the Disney/Pixar animated film Finding Nemo. Late in the year, he appeared in the Coen Brothers romantic comedy, Intolerable Cruelty alongside George Clooney and Catherine Zeta-Jones. Rush starred in the film Pirates of the Caribbean: The Curse of the Black Pearl, released in summer 2003, as Captain Hector Barbossa. The film was a massive financial success earning $654.3 million. Rush would continue to reprise the role in its sequels, Dead Man's Chest (2006), At World's End (2007), On Stranger Tides (2011) and Dead Men Tell No Tales (2017). In addition, Rush reprised his character's voice for the enhancements at the Pirates of the Caribbean attractions at the Disneyland and Magic Kingdom theme parks, which involved an audio-animatronic with Rush's likeness being installed (including one at Tokyo Disneyland).

Rush played actor Peter Sellers in the HBO television film The Life and Death of Peter Sellers. For this performance, he won various awards including the Primetime Emmy Award for Outstanding Lead Actor in a Miniseries or Movie, Golden Globe Award for Best Actor – Miniseries or Television Film, and Screen Actors Guild Award for Outstanding Performance by a Male Actor in a Miniseries or Television Movie. In 2005, he appeared in Steven Spielberg's Munich as Ephraim, a Mossad agent. The film is an account of Mossad assassinations following the Munich massacre, the Israeli government's secret retaliation against the Palestine Liberation Organization after the Munich massacre at the 1972 Summer Olympics. It was a critical and financial success earning five Academy Award nominations including for Best Picture. In 2017, the film was named the 16th "Best Film of the 21st Century So Far" by The New York Times. In 2006, Rush hosted the Australian Film Institute Awards for the Nine Network. He was the master of ceremonies again at the 2007 AFI Awards.

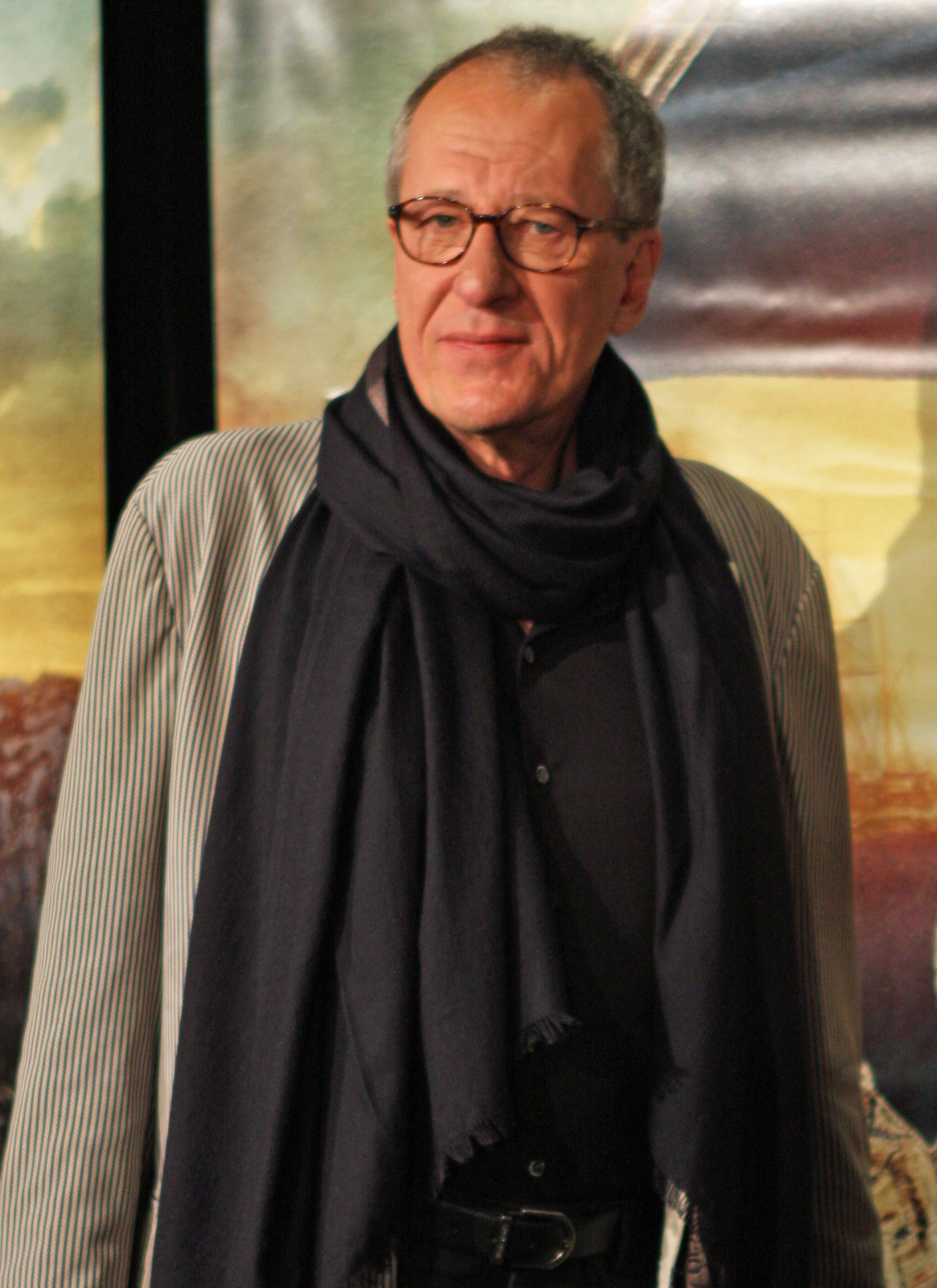
Rush at the Sydney premiere of Pirates of the Caribbean: On Stranger Tides in 2011

Rush has appeared on stage for the Brisbane Arts Theatre and in many other theatre venues. He has also worked as a theatre director. In 2007, he starred as King Berenger in a production of Eugène Ionesco's Exit the King at the Malthouse Theatre in Melbourne and Company B in Sydney, directed by Neil Armfield. For this performance, he received a Helpmann Award nomination for best male actor in a play. In the beginning of 2009, Rush appeared in a series of special edition postage stamps featuring some of Australia's internationally recognised actors. He, Cate Blanchett, Russell Crowe, and Nicole Kidman each appear twice in the series. Rush's image is taken from Shine. He also appeared in the musical film Bran Nue Dae as Father Benedictus alongside Rocky McKenzie, Ernie Dingo, Jessica Mauboy, Missy Higgins, Deborah Mailman, Dan Sultan, and Magda Szubanski.

In 2009, Rush made his Broadway debut in a re-staging of Exit the King under Malthouse Theatre's touring moniker Malthouse Melbourne and Company B Belvoir. This re-staging featured a new American cast including Susan Sarandon. The show opened on 26 March 2009 at the Ethel Barrymore Theatre. Rush won the Outer Critics Circle Award, Theatre World Award, Drama Desk Award, the Distinguished Performance Award from the Drama League Award and the 2009 Tony Award for Best Performance by a Leading Actor in a Play. In 2010, Rush returned to the stage, playing Man in Chair in The Drowsy Chaperone on its Australian tour. That same year he also voiced Ezylryb/Lyze of Kiel in Legend of the Guardians and played speech and language therapist Lionel Logue in Tom Hooper's historical drama The King's Speech concerning King George VI, played by Colin Firth, and his speech impediment. The film focuses on their unlikely friendship as they work together after Edward VIII played by Guy Pearce, abdicates the throne. The new king relies on Logue to help him make his first wartime radio broadcast upon Britain's declaration of war on Germany in 1939. The film also starred Helena Bonham Carter as Queen Elizabeth, and Jennifer Ehle as Myrtle Logue. The film was a financial success earning $424 million at the box office. Rush's performance was praised by critics and earned him a British Academy Film Award win and nominations for the Academy Awards and Golden Globe Awards for Best Supporting Actor.

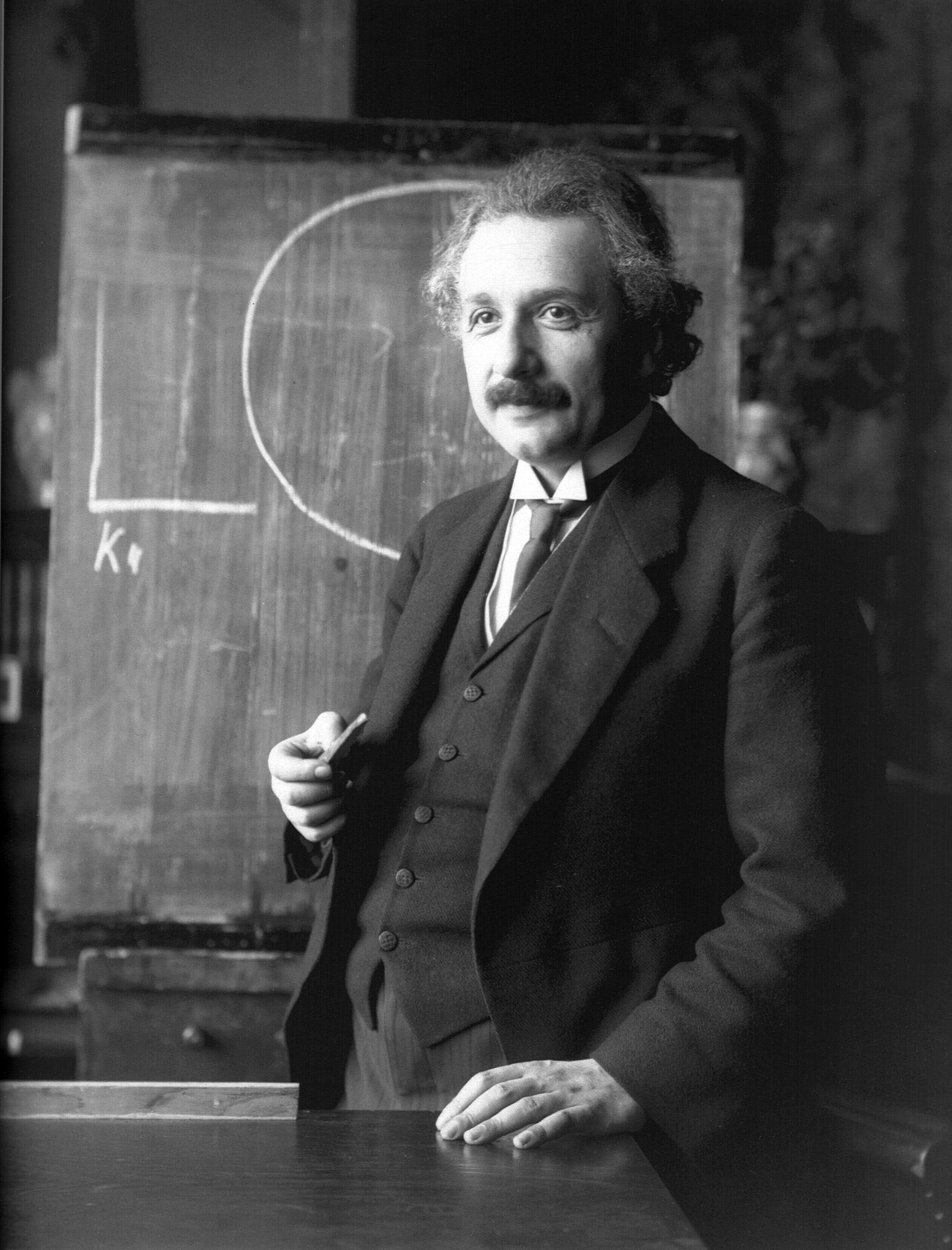
Rush portrayed Albert Einstein in the miniseries Genius (2017) earning a Primetime Emmy Award nomination

Rush returned as Captain Hector Barbossa in Pirates of the Caribbean: On Stranger Tides, starring Johnny Depp, in 2011. Rush is also preparing for a film version of The Drowsy Chaperone, an award-winning stage musical. In addition, he voiced the alien Tomar-Re in the film adaptation of the Green Lantern comic book series. In 2011 Rush portrayed Sir Basil Hunter in the Fred Schepisi directed adaptation of Australian Nobel laureate Patrick White's novel, The Eye of the Storm. In 2011, Rush played the lead in a theatrical adaptation of Nikolai Gogol's short story The Diary of a Madman at the Brooklyn Academy of Music. He won for this role the Helpmann Award and was nominated for the Drama Desk Award. From November 2011, Rush played the role of Lady Bracknell in the Melbourne Theatre Company production of The Importance of Being Earnest. Other actors from the 1988 production include Jane Menelaus, this time as Miss Prism, and Bob Hornery, who had played Canon Chasuble, as the two butlers. In 2011, Rush made a cameo in a commercial, The Potato Peeler, for the Melbourne International Film Festival (MIFF), playing a Polish farmer. He spoke his lines in Polish for the part. From 2011 to 2017, Rush was served as the foundation president of the newly formed Australian Academy of Cinema and Television Arts.

=== 2012–present ===
In 2013, Rush appeared alongside Jim Sturgess in psychological thriller The Best Offer with The Hollywood Reporter noting in their mixed review, "[The film] is worth watching for Geoffrey Rush’s sensitive, never pandering performance as an effete master auctioneer who gradually discovers he has a heart". Rush also appeared in the film adaptation of the best-selling novel The Book Thief (2013). Dennis Harvey of Variety Magazine praised his performance writing, that "Rush generously provides the movie's primary warmth and humor". His performance earned him a nomination for the AACTA International Award for Best Supporting Actor. From 2015 to 2016 Rush returned to the stage portraying the title character in a revival of William Shakespeare's King Lear at the Roslyn Packer Theatre in Australia. Jason Blake of The Sydney Morning Herald wrote of his performance, "Like all great clowns, Rush has an instinctive understanding of the abject. What he lacks in a traditional stage monarch's gravitas, he makes up for in willingness and ability to plunge through the merely pitiable and into the realms of anguish and despair."

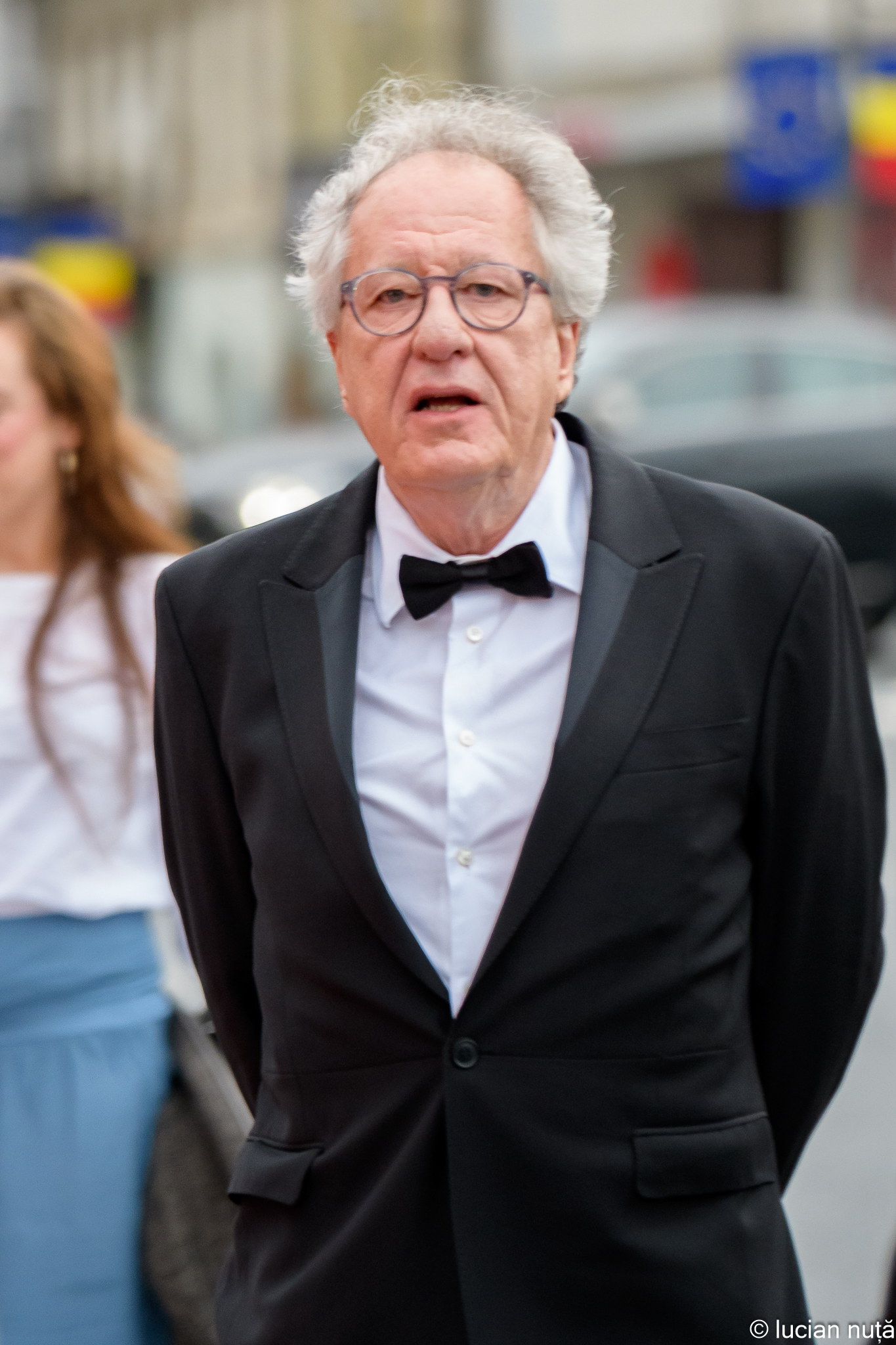
Rush at TIFF in 2023

Rush returned to television, portraying Albert Einstein in the first season of National Geographic's limited anthology series Genius (2017). The series was executive produced by Ron Howard and also starred Emily Watson. Luke Buckmaster of The Guardian wrote, "[The series] offers a predictably excellent performance from Rush, who since his breakthrough in 1996’s Shine as the tormented pianist David Helfgott, has been attracted to eccentric genius characters like a moth to the light." Rush won widespread acclaim earning nominations for the Primetime Emmy Award, Golden Globe Award and Screen Actors Guild Award for Best Actor in a Limited Series or Television Film. Also in 2017, Rush starred in Stanley Tucci's film Final Portrait alongside Armie Hammer. The film had its world premiere at the Berlin International Film Festival. The film received positive reviews from critics earning a 73% from Rotten Tomatoes with the consensus reading, "Final Portrait finds writer-director Stanley Tucci patiently telling a quietly absorbing story, brought to life by a talented ensemble led by Geoffrey Rush and Armie Hammer.

In 2018, Rush played the character of adult Michael Kingley in the family drama Storm Boy alongside Finn Little, Jai Courtney, and Trevor Jamieson. It was released on 17 January 2019. Frank Scheck of The Hollywood Reporter wrote that the film "provide[s] the opportunity for Rush to deliver one of his more subtle, effective performances in recent years". In 2023 it was announced Rush would star opposite John Lithgow in the horror thriller The Rule of Jenny Pen. The film received positive reviews with Alison Foreman of IndieWire writing, "Both Lithgow and Rush [are] fully committed to the twisted two-hander" adding, "Rush enjoys a wonderfully self-contradictory performance that’s equal parts desperate and ferocious. Summoning the bravado he once brought to the Pirates of the Caribbean films." Lithgow and Rush shared the Best Actor prize at Spain’s Sitges Film Festival in October 2024.

In 2022, he was announced to be starring as Groucho Marx in an adaptation of the memoir Raised Eyebrows. The film will be directed by Oren Moverman and co-star Sienna Miller and Charlie Plummer. Rush said of the project that the Marx film is not a biopic, but rather a “tragic comedy about mortality”, about the last three years of Marx’s life. Rush is also set to star opposite Emma Roberts in the action-comedy film Verona Spies. In 2025, it was announced Rush would star opposite Isabelle Huppert in a film adaptation of the Justin Fleming stage play Burnt Piano directed by Fred Schepisi.

== Style and influences ==
Known for his deep voice and expressive face, Rush has acted in extensive roles in film, theater and television. He is one of the few people to have won the "Triple Crown" (Emmy Award, Tony Award and Academy Award). Throughout Rush's career he has been known to play eccentric off-beat characters. He credits the traditional theater as well as the movements of Jacques Lecoq and European actor-based traditions which appealed to him. He has described the roles he's played as being, "the drunks, the rogues, the ratbags, the idiots, and the wise fools." Time Out noted his memorable roles in period dramas. Rush has stated, "Costume drama is a very difficult phrase for me. I want to be taken into the inner lives and the world and the political forces, the inner and outer worlds of the narrative with an immediacy that makes me not even think about the costumes."

Cate Blanchett has cited Rush as an acting influence and mentor when they acted alongside each other in a 1993 production of David Mamet's Oleanna at the Sydney Theater Company. Toni Collette has said that she was influenced by Rush to become an actress after seeing him in the stage performance of The Diary of a Madman in 1989. John Lithgow described him as "one of the great actors". In 2018, upon winning the Screen Actors Guild Award as Winston Churchill for Darkest Hour, Gary Oldman praised Rush as a "giant of acting" along with Robert De Niro, Morgan Freeman, Richard Jenkins, and Denzel Washington.

== Acting credits ==
=== Film ===
Year	Title	Role	Notes
1981	Hoodwink	Detective 1	
1982	Starstruck	Floor Manager	
1987	Twelfth Night	Sir Andrew Aguecheek	
1995	Dad and Dave: On Our Selection	Dave Rudd	
1996	Shine	David Helfgott	
1996	Children of the Revolution	Zachary Welch	
1997	Oscar and Lucinda	Narrator	Voice
1998	A Little Bit of Soul	Godfrey Usher	
1998	Elizabeth	Sir Francis Walsingham	
1998	Les Misérables	Inspector Javert	
1998	Shakespeare in Love	Philip Henslowe	
1999	Mystery Men	Casanova Frankenstein	
1999	House on Haunted Hill	Stephen H. Price	
2000	Quills	Marquis de Sade	
2000	The Magic Pudding	Bunyip Bluegum	Voice; Animated Feature
2001	The Tailor of Panama	Harold "Harry" Pendel	
2001	Lantana	John Knox	
2002	Frida	Leon Trotsky	
2002	The Banger Sisters	Harry Plummer	
2003	Swimming Upstream	Harold Fingleton	
2003	Ned Kelly	Superintendent Francis Hare	
2003	Finding Nemo	Nigel (the Pelican)	Voice; Animated Feature
2003	Harvie Krumpet	Narrator	Voice; Short
2003	Pirates of the Caribbean: The Curse of the Black Pearl	Captain Hector Barbossa	
2003	Intolerable Cruelty	Donovan Donaly	
2005	Munich	Ephraim	
2006	Pirates of the Caribbean: Dead Man's Chest	Captain Hector Barbossa	Cameo (uncredited)
2006	Candy	Casper	
2007	Pirates of the Caribbean: At World's End	Captain Hector Barbossa	
2007	Elizabeth: The Golden Age	Sir Francis Walsingham	
2008	$9.99	Angel	Voice
2009	Bran Nue Dae	Father Benedictus	
2010	Legend of the Guardians: The Owls of Ga'Hoole	Ezylryb/Lyze of Kiel	Voice; Animated Film
2010	The King's Speech	Lionel Logue	
2010	The Warrior's Way	Ron	
2011	Pirates of the Caribbean: On Stranger Tides	Captain Hector Barbossa	
2011	Green Lantern	Tomar-Re	Voice
2011	The Eye of the Storm	Basil Hunter	
2013	The Best Offer	Virgil Oldman	
2013	The Book Thief	Hans Hubermann	
2014	Unity	Narrator	Documentary
2015	The Daughter	Henry Neilson	
2015	Minions	The Narrator	Voice; Animated Film
2015	Holding the Man	Barry	
2016	Gods of Egypt	Ra	
2017	Final Portrait	Alberto Giacometti	
2017	Pirates of the Caribbean: Dead Men Tell No Tales	Captain Hector Barbossa	
2019	Storm Boy	Mike "Storm Boy" Kingley	
2024	The Rule of Jenny Pen	Stefan Mortensen	
2026	Mr. Nelson, Did You Kill People?	Dr. Daniels	Post-Production
TBA	Shearing The Love	Bob Castlehead	Post-Production
TBA	Raised Eyebrows	Groucho Marx	

=== Television ===
Year	Title	Role	Notes	Ref.
1979–81	Consumer Capers	Jim Boy	14 episodes	
1981	Menotti	Fr. Peter Fuller	14 episodes	
1987	Frontier	David Collins	Miniseries; 3 episodes	
1996	Mercury	Bill Wyatt	14 episodes	
2004	The Life and Death of Peter Sellers	Peter Sellers	Television Movie, HBO	
2004	Kath & Kim	Geoff	Episode: "Sitting on a Pile"	
2010	Lowdown	Narrator/God	Voice; 16 episodes	
2015	Who Do You Think You Are?	Himself	Episode: "Geoffrey Rush"	
2017	Genius	Albert Einstein	Miniseries, National Geographic	

=== Theatre ===
As actor

Year	Title	Role	Venue	Ref.
1981	Teeth ‘n’ Smiles		Nimrod Theatre Company	
1983	The Blind Giant is Dancing	Allen Fitzgerald	Australian Theatre Company	
1986	Pell Mell	Director	Belvoir St Theatre, Sydney	
1986	Pearls Before Swine	Director	Belvoir St Theatre, Sydney	
1987	The Winters Tale	Performer	The Playhouse, Adelaide	
1989	Troilus and Cressida	Performer	Old Building Museum, Australia	
1993	Oleanna	John	Sydney Theatre Company	
1994	Hamlet	Horatio	Belvoir St Theatre, Australia	
1998	The Marriage of Figaro	Figaro	Queensland Arts Centre, Australia	
2007	Exit the King	King Berenger	Malthouse Theatre, Australia	
2009	Exit the King	King Berenger	Ethel Barrymore Theatre, Broadway	
2010	The Drowsy Chaperone	Man in Chair	Arts Centre Melbourne, Australia	
2011	Diary of a Madman	Aksentii Poprischin	Harvey Theatre, Brooklyn	
2011–12	The Importance of Being Earnest	Lady Augusta Bracknell	Sumner Theatre, Australia	
2012	A Funny Thing Happened on the Way to the Forum	Prologus Pseudolus	Her Majesty's Theatre, Australia	
2015–16	King Lear	Lear	Roslyn Packer Theatre, Australia	

As director

Year	Title	Role	Venue
1986	Pearls Before Swine	Director	Belvoir St Theatre, Seymour Centre, Universal Theatre, Melbourne

=== Theme parks ===
Year	Title	Role	Venue
2006	Pirates of the Caribbean	Captain Hector Barbossa	Disneyland; Walt Disney World

== Awards and honours ==
Rush has won what is known as the Triple Crown of Acting, meaning an Academy Award, Tony Award and Emmy Award, which represent film, theatre and television respectively. Over his career he has also received three British Academy Film Awards, two Golden Globe Awards, and four Screen Actors Guild Awards. Rush received his Oscar for his performance in Shine (1996). He has received three other nominations for his roles in Shakespeare in Love (1998), Quills (2000), and The King's Speech (2010). For his work in television he received the Primetime Emmy Award for Outstanding Actor in a Limited Series or Television Movie for his performance as Peter Sellers in The Life and Death of Peter Sellers (2003). Rush received his Tony Award for Best Actor in a Play for his performance in the French absurdist comedy Exit the King (2009).

Rush is the founding president of the Australian Academy of Cinema and Television Arts and was named the 2012 Australian of the Year. In 2014 he was appointed a Companion of the Order of Australia (AC) Australia's highest civilian honour, for eminent service to the arts as a theatre performer, motion picture actor and film producer, as a role model and mentor for aspiring artists, and through support for, and promotion of, the Australian arts industry.

Rush has received various honours over his career including the Sidney Myer Performing Arts Awards in 1994. He was awarded an Honorary Doctorate of Letters by the University of Queensland, in Australia in 1998. In 2001 he was awarded the Australian Centenary Medal in the Queen's New Year's Honours List for his services to the arts. In 2003 he received the Hollywood Film Festival for Supporting Actor of the Year. In 2003 he received the Australian Film Institute Award for Global Achievement Award. The following year he received Brisbane International Film Festival's Chauvel Award. In 2009 he received Australian Film Institute Longford Life Achievement Award and was announced as one of the Q150 Icons of Queensland for his role as an "Influential Artist". In 2011 he was honoured with Santa Barbara International Film Festival's Montecito Award.

In 2022, he received the Award for Outstanding Artistic Contribution to World Cinema at the Karlovy Vary International Film Festival.

== Personal life ==
=== Marriage and family ===
Since 1988, Rush has been married to actress Jane Menelaus, with whom he has a daughter and a son. Rush lives in Melbourne, and spent several years in Castlemaine, Victoria.

=== Legal issues ===
On 30 November 2017, the Sydney tabloid newspaper The Daily Telegraph published a front-page article alleging that Rush engaged in "inappropriate behaviour" onstage with a co-star during the Sydney Theatre Company's 2015 production of King Lear. The story contained no corroboration for the allegations, though the STC divulged to the Telegraph that they had received a complaint against Rush alleging sexual harassment. Eryn Jean Norvill, who had starred as Cordelia alongside Rush, alleged that the actor had touched her inappropriately without her consent.

The Telegraph's story was picked up by various newspapers in Australia but not by the Melbourne Herald Sun because of concerns that the Telegraph was "running with a yarn which is highly libellous". Rush denied the allegations and, on 8 December 2017, announced that he had filed a defamation suit with the Federal Court of Australia, alleged that the Telegraph "made false, pejorative and demeaning claims, splattering them with unrelenting bombast on its front pages". In an affidavit, Rush stated that as a result of the allegations, he had been suffering from anxiety, insomnia and loss of appetite, and felt that "his worth to the theatre and film industry is now irreparably damaged".

The trial was concluded on 9 November 2018. On 11 April 2019, the judge ruled in favour of Rush, awarding him $850,000. In his written statement defending his ruling, Justice Michael Wigney said that none of Norvill's claims were proven, due to her evidence being "not credible or reliable and contradicted by other members of the cast", and that Rush's evidence was overwhelming. He also criticised the Telegraph for "recklessly irresponsible pieces of sensationalist journalism of the very worst kind". A month later, the Telegraph was ordered to pay Rush an extended judgement of $2.87 million. The Telegraph motioned to appeal but the judgement was upheld.

=== Further allegations ===
On 16 December 2018, The New York Times published an interview with Australian actress Yael Stone, who accused Rush of sexual misconduct during the production of a theatre adaptation of Diary of a Madman in 2010 and 2011. Among the allegations Stone made in interviews to the Times and ABC were incidents where Rush angled a hand mirror over a shower cubicle to observe her naked, sent her flirty text messages and danced naked in front of her in her dressing room.

Rush responded in a statement to the Times through his attorneys, saying that Stone's allegations were "incorrect and in some instances have been taken completely out of context. However, clearly Yael has been upset on occasion by the spirited enthusiasm I generally bring to my work. I sincerely and deeply regret if I have caused her any distress. This, most certainly, has never been my intention."

== See also ==
- List of actors with Academy Award nominations
- List of actors with more than one Academy Award nomination in the acting categories
- List of Academy Award winners and nominees from Australia
- List of Golden Globe winners
- List of Primetime Emmy Award winners
- List of Australian film actors

Cultural offices
New title	President of the Australian Academy of Cinema and Television Arts; 2011–2017	Succeeded by vacant
Awards and achievements
Preceded by Simon McKeon	Australian of the Year; 2012	Succeeded by Ita Buttrose
