= Augusta Kochanowska =

Polish painter and illustrator (1868–1927)

- Августа Йосипівна Кохановська
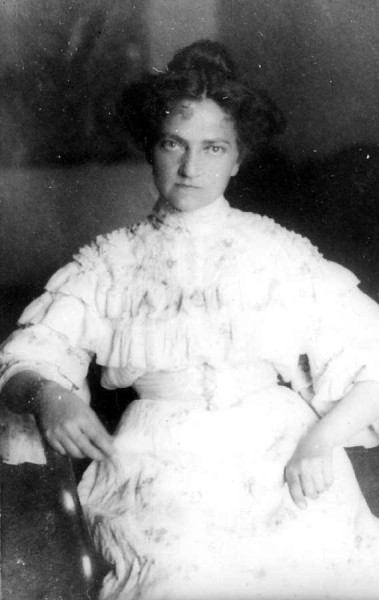
- Born: 6 July 1868; Sadhora, Duchy of Bukovina
- Died: 7 December 1927 (aged 59); Toruń, Poland
- Other names: Auguste Kochanowska, Avgusta Yosypivna Kokhanovska

Augusta Kochanowska (6 July 1868 – 7 December 1927) was a Bukovinian painter, illustrator and ethnographer of Polish origin. She was a researcher of Hutsul culture, which she documented in her paintings. She was a close friend of a Ukrainian writer and playwright Olha Kobylianska, whose works she illustrated. She also illustrated books by Ivan Franko and Ivan Nechuy-Levytsky.

In the 21st century, scientific research into the life and work of Augusta Kochanowska has become more active, with a number of publications and catalogs published.

== Biography ==
Augusta Kochanowska was born on 6 July 1868 in Sadhora, Duchy of Bukovina (now district of Chernivtsi, Ukraine) in the family of a civil servant. Soon the family moved to Câmpulung, where she spent her childhood and youth. In 1885, they returned to Chernivtsi, where her father received a position at the district council. She began taking her first drawing lessons from the artist Tadeusz von Popiel, who at one time studied at the Kraków Academy of Arts.

From 1894 until 1899, she studied at the University of Applied Arts Vienna. After 5 years of study, Kochanowska returned to Chernivtsi, where she began to study of Hutsul life and folk art. She traveled around Bukovina, in order to see in detail the environment, clothing, and crafts of Bukovinian peasants, sketching her observations. During this period she produced several paintings: “Return of the Hutsuls from the Fair” (1906), “Old Hutsul” (1910), “Hutsul with a Hoe” and “Hutsuls on the Road” (both late 19th – early 20th centuries). She lived in Chernivtsi from the period of 1885 until 1920, with some breaks.

Her work was influenced by Ukrainian writer Olha Kobylianska, who she met in 1874. The themes of Kobylyanska's works, which described the problems faced by Ukrainian women, particularly in obtaining education and a profession, were close to Kochanowska. Her sketches of Kobylianska's works were later used to illustrate books.

According to her death certificate, she died in the Polish city of Toruń on 7 December 1927. Ukrainian reference publications give the date of death as 7 December 1929.

== Creative and ethnographic work ==
Kochanowska worked in an academic manner, in such genres as portrait, landscape, and illustration; in techniques: oils, watercolors, pastels, gouache, charcoal, pencil.

She illustrated Ivan Franko novel "Petriis and Dovbuschukys" (1913), as well covers for books by Ivan Nechuy-Levytskyi.

Kochanowska provided 8 black-and-white illustrations for Olha Kobylianska's works "Battle", "Nature", and "Uncultured", which were included in the collection "Little Russian Short Stories", which was printed in German in 1901. The modernist book cover features an ornamental design with floral elements and a portrait of a woman in folk costume.

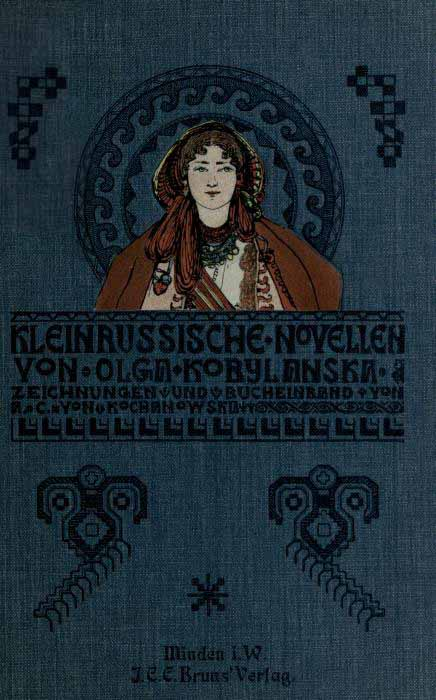
Cover of Olha Kobylianska's "Little Russian Novels", 1901

She participated in exhibitions in Chernivtsi, and 1910, at the international hunting exhibition in Vienna her works were awarded a diploma. Her ethnographic articles, which she illustrated herself, were published in several issues of the Viennese Journal of Austrian Folk Art from 1898 to 1908.

In addition to painting and ethnography, she was also concerned with the restoration of churches and monastery buildings. According to documents stored in the Austrian state archives, in 1910 Augusta Kochanowska was awarded a scholarship from the Ministry of Culture and Education in the amount of 800 kreuzers to improve her knowledge in the field of restoration of monastery buildings in Bukovina. In addition, she also had an official assignment from the government to restore the interior paintings in the monastery of the village of Putna in Southern Bukovina.

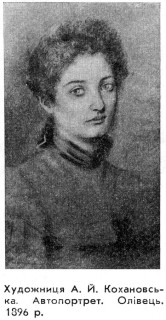
Self-portrait, 1896, pencil

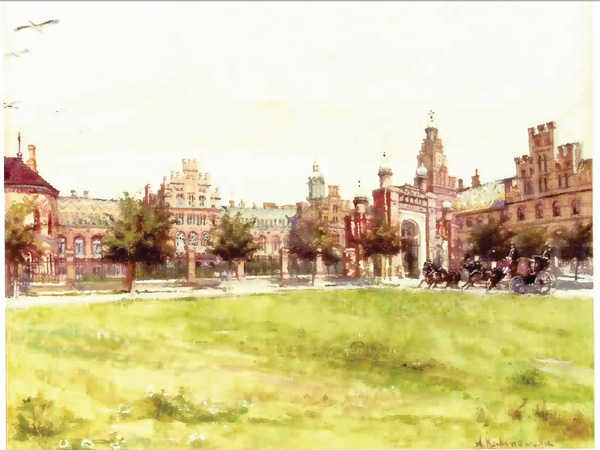
"Bishop's palace", 1890

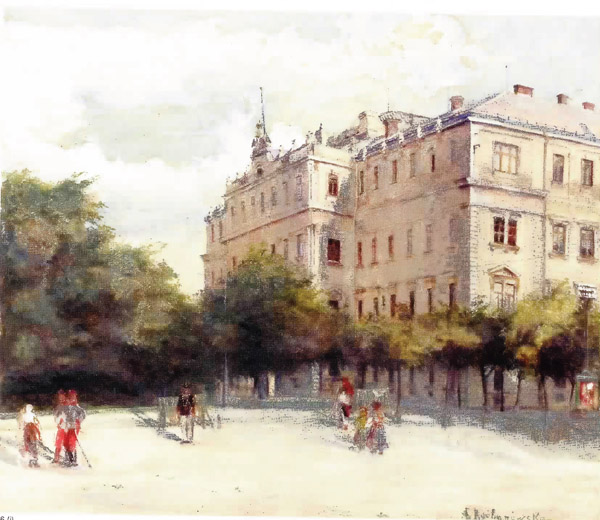
"Regional Government in Chernivtsi", 1890

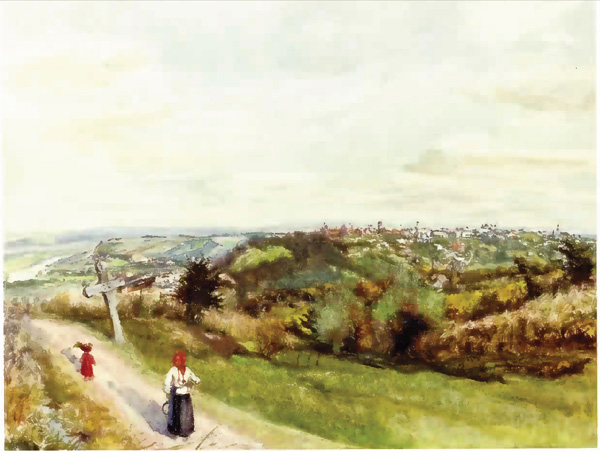
"View of Chernivtsi", 1890

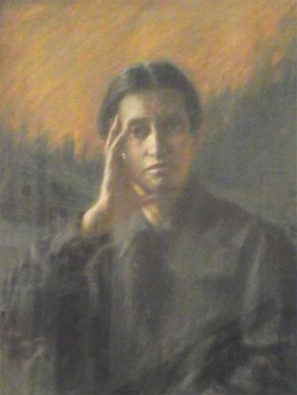
Portrait of Olha Kobylianska, 1926, pastel

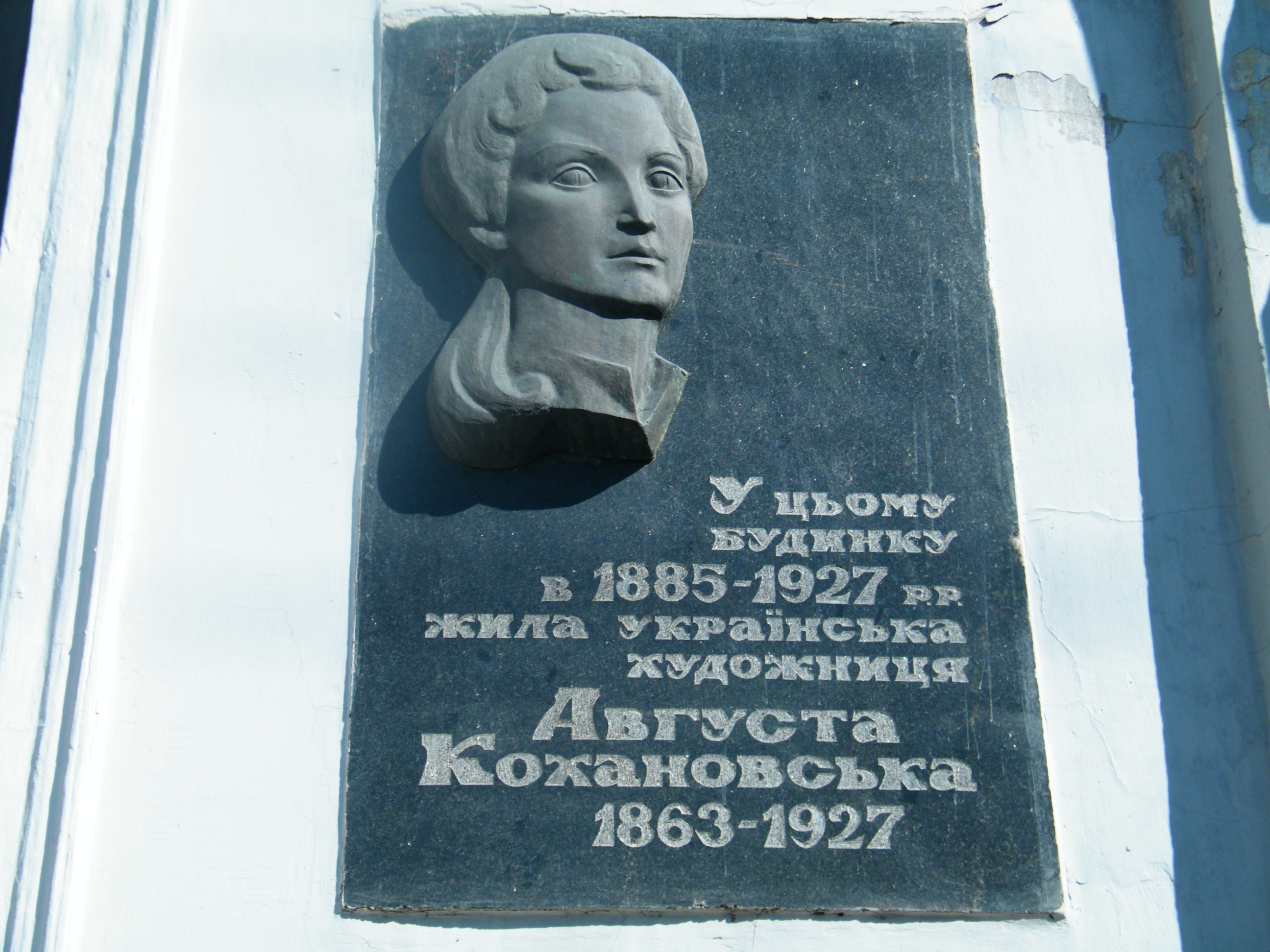
Memorial plaque on her house where in Chernivtsi

=== Posthumous recognition ===
In 2002, three watercolors by Augusta Kochanowska were exhibited at the Sotheby's auction in London: “Bishop's Palace”, “Street in Łódź”, "View of Kraków" (“Residence of Bukovinian Metropolitans. Chernivtsi”, “Regional Administration in Chernivtsi” and “View of Chernivtsi” – according to the attribution by Tetyana Duhaeva in 2010 and 2017). All works were painted in 1890, a few years before Kochanowska entered the Vienna School of Decorative and Applied Arts.

In 2004, he first monograph about the artist, "Augusta Kochanowska. 1868—1927," was published in Chernivtsi. In 2012, the literary and artistic publication "Augusta Kochanowska", was recognized as the Book of the Year of Bukovina in the "Art" nomination.

Her works are exhibited in the Chernivtsi Regional Art Museum, as well as presented in the Chernivtsi Regional Museum of Local Lore and the Chernivtsi Literary and Memorial Museum of Olga Kobylianska. In 2013, the Chernivtsi Regional Art Museum published a catalog of the artist's life and work.
