= Chernivtsi Regional Art Museum =

Regional Art Museum in Chernivtsi, Ukraine

- Чернівецький обласний художній музей
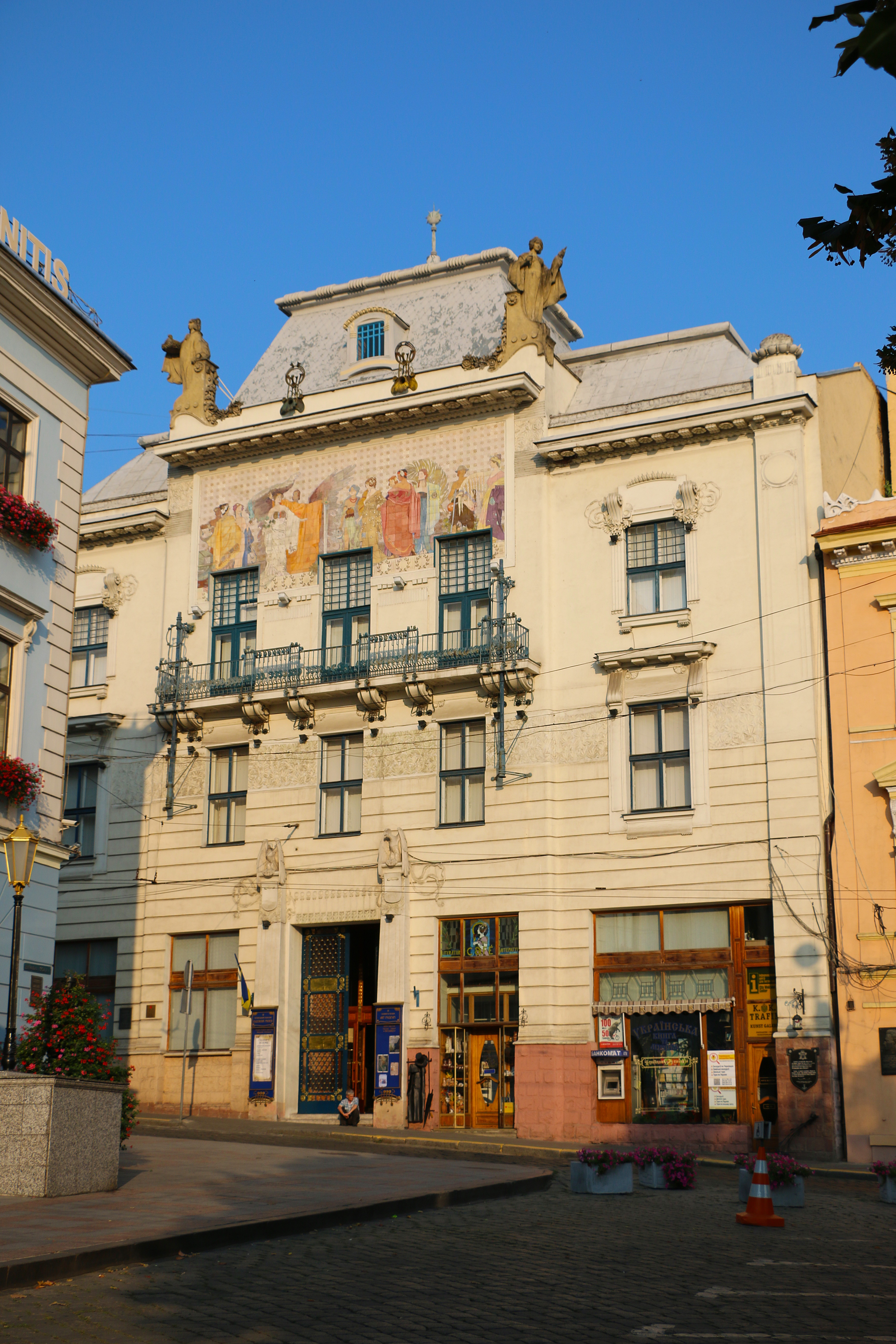
- Established: 1988
- Location: 10 Tsentralna Square, Chernivtsi, Chernivtsi Oblast, Ukraine
- Coordinates: 48°17′30.36″N 25°56′02.62″E
- Type: Regional Art Museum
- Collections: Art and Culture of Bukovina
- Collection size: 12,000
- Director: Inna Kitsul
- Architects: Hubert Gessner and Prokop Šupich
- Website: http://artmuz.cv.ua/

The Chernivtsi Regional Art Museum (Ukrainian: Чернівецький обласний художній музей) is an art museum located in Chernivtsi, Ukraine. The museum was founded in 1988 and maintains a collection of over 12 thousands exhibits, with a particular focus on the art of the historic region of Bukovina. The museum is located in a former bank building, an Art Nouveau architectural monument of national significance.

== History ==
The Chernivtsi Art Museum was created in 1988 from the art department of the Chernivtsi Museum of Local Lore. The collection, dating from the decades following Museum's foundation in 1863, formed the basis of the collection of the newly created institution. The new art museum opened in 1988 in then inactive Holy Spirit Cathedral.

In 1990, after the reopening of the Holy Spirit Cathedral, the exhibits of the Art Museum were stored in the building of the former hotel of the Communist Party Regional Committee.

In 1991, the museum was moved into the building of the historic Bukovina Savings Bank located on the central square of the city. The collection was subsequently enhanced and expanded with transfers coordinated by the Directorate of Art Exhibitions of the Ministry of Culture of Ukraine, as well as charitable gifts to museum from individual artists and patrons.

In 1996, after substantial restorations, a permanent exhibition was opened, featuring regional decorative and religious artworks and cultural artifacts of Bukovina of the 17th-20th centuries. Large-scale restoration of the interior stained-glass windows was undertaken in 2011.

In 2013, a section dedicated to the fine art of the middle of the 20th to the beginning of the 21st century was opened.

== Museum building ==
The building of the Chernivtsi Art Museum is an architectural monument of national significance, built in the tradition of the Vienna Secession in the Art Nouveau style for the Bukovina Savings Bank, by architects Hubert Gessner, Prokop Šupich and Robert Vitek, who oversaw the construction works. The building was completed in 1900. The original exterior and interiors have been generally preserved, and are now part of the sightseeing tour.

=== Exterior and Facade ===
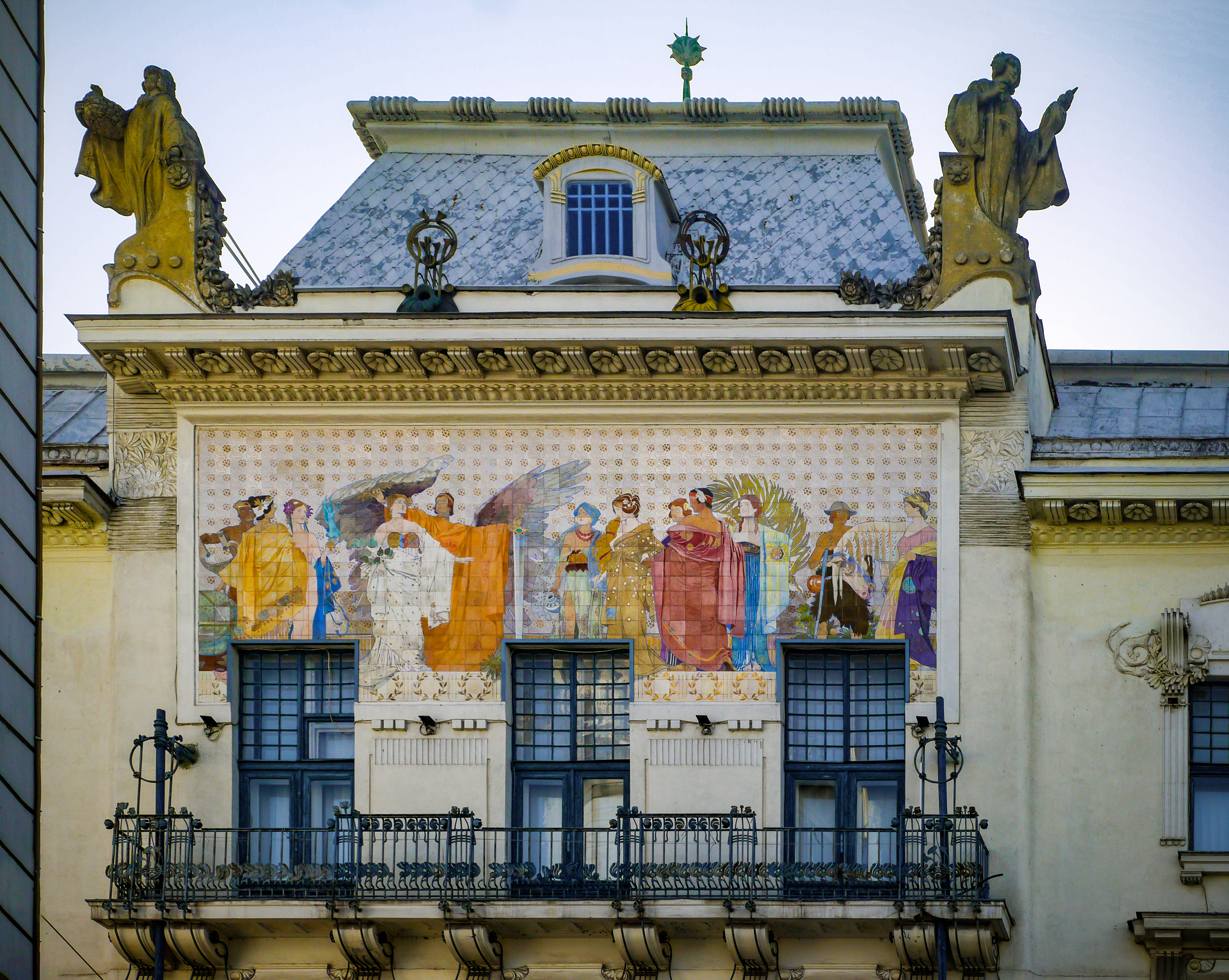
Majolica Facade Mural, Chernivtsi Regional Art Museum

On the main facade, there is a risalit with a balcony placed on consoles and a polychrome Majolica panel, credited to Joseph Adolph Lang and signed as "J. Lan[g]". The work features a complex composition on a mythological theme, interpreted as representation paralleling the Roman Empire and the Austro-Hungarian Empire during the reign of Franz Joseph I. The images of 12 gods depict the 12 most important provinces of the empire. Bukovina is represented by the fourth figure from the left, carrying green and white branches.

Two female sculptures are installed on the roof above the eaves. At the level of the windows of the second floor, the building is decorated with a frieze in the form of scattered leaves, formerly covered with gilding. The doors of the central entrance are made of forged metal with floral ornaments and horizontal inserts incorporating the image of bees. On the pylons on both sides of the entrance are sculptures of two eagles, which seem to be guarding the entrance to the building.

=== Interior ===
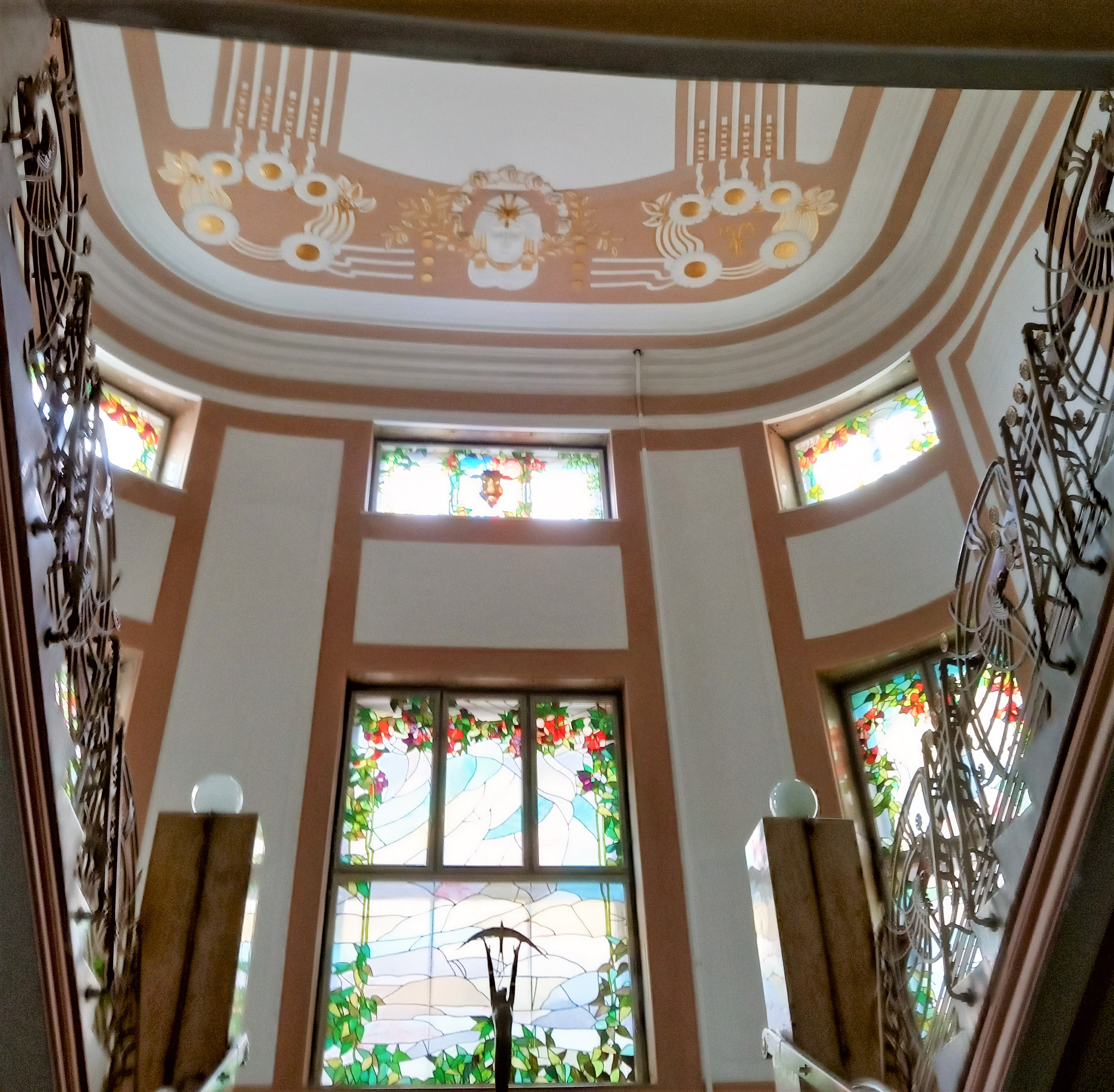
Main Staircase and Atrium

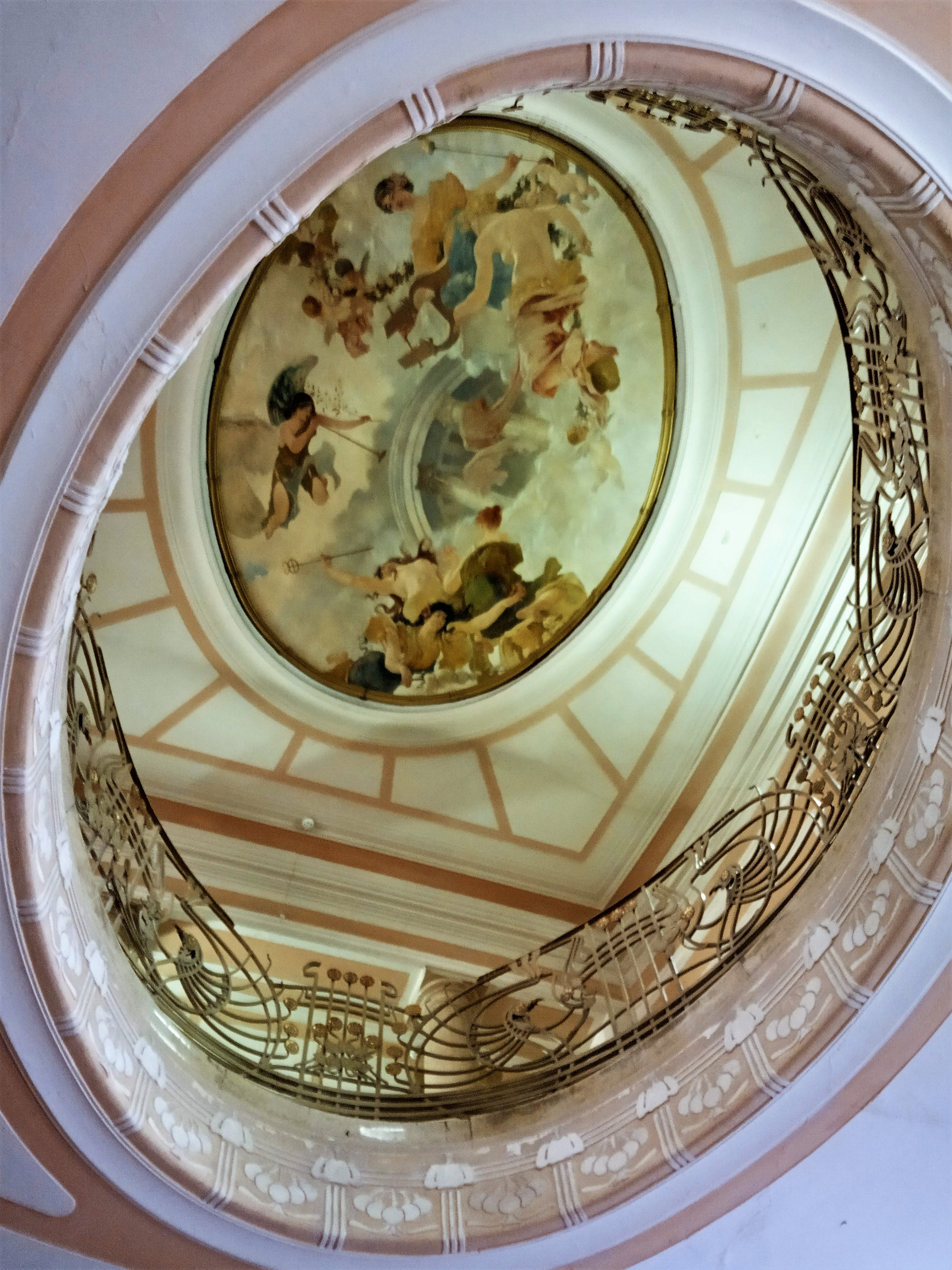
Ceiling panneau

The building has an expressive interior. The lobby of the first floor is decorated with six columns. At the beginning of the grand staircase are two pylons ending with male and female busts on figured pedestals. A wide staircase framed by wrought iron bars with floral and ornithomorphic ornaments leads from the first to the second and third floors. The staircases between the floors are decorated with large stained-glass windows with plant motifs — images of bright flowers and green leaves.

On one of the stained-glass windows on the third floor, the historic coat of arms of Bukovina is inscribed in plant motifs.

In the center of the second-floor lobby are four columns and a trapezoidal marble fireplace decorated with wrought copper featuring floral ornamentation. The space of the second and third floors is united by an oval opening, decorated with a relief ornament and forged bars, identical to those on the stairs. The contours of this slot are repeated in the oval ceiling of the third floor. This large allegorical composition on canvas with images of female figures and putti is somewhat different from the rest of the decor, stylistically approaching academic art. Its creation is attributed to a Ukrainian artist Mykola Ivasyuk.

== Collection ==
The collection includes about 12,000 exhibits of the main, research and auxiliary funds. The basis of the museum collection is Bukovinian art of the 17th–20th centuries, including expositions of household and glass icons and painters of the 18th–19th centuries, including German painter Eduard von Grützner, Epaminonda Bucevschi and a Polish illustrator and local ethnographer Augusta Kochanowska. The collection of icon painting of the 17th–20th centuries includes Bukovina household images, icons on glass, valuable works of folk and professional icon painting.. Painters of the 18th-19th centuries, including German painter Eduard von Grützner and E. Buchevsky.

In the 1990s, after a series of ethnographic expeditions across the Chernivtsi oblast, the museum came into possession of a collection of religious banners, being now exhibited as a part of "Archangel Michael" exposition.

== Exhibits and publications ==
During the museum's tenure, a significant number of exhibitions have been organized, and projects developed. Prior to February 2022, a series of annual openings were developed, including art actions and events for the enhancement of the cultural life of the city and the country.

The exhibition work of the Chernivtsi Art Museum is closely related to scientific and educational activities. Employees of the Chernivtsi Art Museum are the authors of numerous publications on art, including scientific publications, a number of catalogs and booklets about the work of Bukovina artists.

These include

- Tetyana Dugayeva, Iryna Mishchenko. Artists of Bukovina. Encyclopedic reference book, volume 1. (1998)
- Iryna Mishchenko. Eusebius of Lipetsk. Artist and personality. (2001)
- Tatiana Dugaeva. Sculptor, doctor of medicine Opanas Shevchukevich. (2002)
- Olena Guzhva. Augusta Kokhanovskaya. 1868–1927. Exhibition Catalogue. (2004)
- I. Kitsul, V. Lyubkivska, O. Guzhva. Chernivetsk Art Museum. (2006)
- I. Kitsul and V. Lyubkivska, text by O. Guzhva. Leon Kopelman. (2006)
- I. F. Kitsul and P. B. Anikin. Semernia Oles Fedorovych. (2007)
- V. Lyubkivska Art museum of the beginning of the 21st century. and its role in shaping the modern cultural environment Materials of the international scientific and practical conference dedicated to the 20th anniversary of the Chernivtsi Regional Art Museum. (2008)
- Tatiana Dugaeva. "Talents of Chernivtsi". 2008 [Archived 7 March 2021 at the Wayback Machine.]
- Valentina Lyubkivska. Love Oak: Selected work. Catalogue (2009)
- I. Kitsul, Larisa Kurushchak. Pilgrimage Icon "Holy City of Jerusalem" (restoration and research) (2010)
