= Ivan Dmitrievich Ermakov =

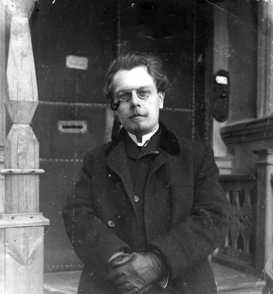
Photo of Ivan Dmitrievich Ermakov

Ivan Dmitrievich Ermakov (Russian: Иван Дмитриевич Ермаков; 6 October 1875 – 32 March 1942) was a Russian and Soviet medical doctor and psychiatrist.

In 1911, Ermakov became director of the Psychiatric Clinic of Moscow University. In 1922 he was the first director of the Russian Psychoanalytic Society. Under his leadership, the Psychological and Psychoanalytic Library published translations of Freud's books.

Arrested in 1940, Ermakov died two years later.
