= Lina Kostenko =

Ukrainian poet and writer (born 1930)

Lina Kostenko L.d'H. Chevalier
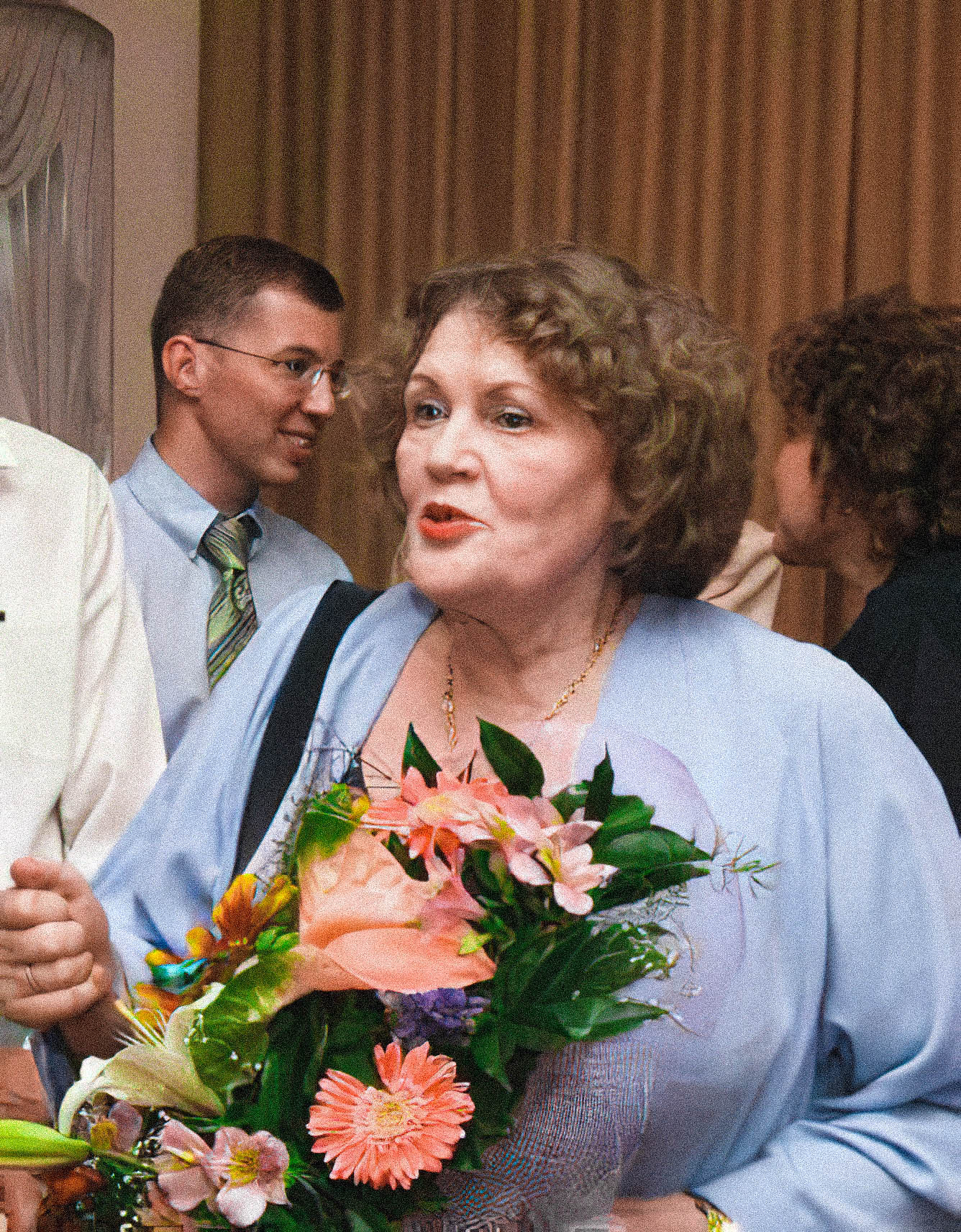
- Kostenko in 2006
- Native name: Ліна Костенко
- Born: 19 March 1930 (age 96) Rzhyshchiv, Ukrainian SSR, Soviet Union (present-day Ukraine)
- Occupation: Poet; literaturer
- Language: Ukrainian
- Genres: Verse novel; lyric poetry; novel
- Literary movement: Sixtiers
- Years active: 1957–present
- Notable works: Marusia Churai; Berestechko (see §)
- Notable awards: Shevchenko National Prize; Antonovych Prize; Legion of Honour

Lina Vasylivna Kostenko (Ukrainian: Ліна Василівна Костенко; born 19 March 1930) is a Ukrainian poet, journalist, writer, publisher, and former Soviet dissident. A founder and leading representative of the Sixtiers poetry movement, Kostenko has been described as one of Ukraine's foremost poets and credited with reviving Ukrainian-language lyric poetry.

Kostenko has been granted numerous honours, including an honorary professorship at Kyiv Mohyla Academy, honorary doctorates of Lviv and Chernivtsi Universities, the Shevchenko National Prize, and the Legion of Honour.

== Early life and career ==
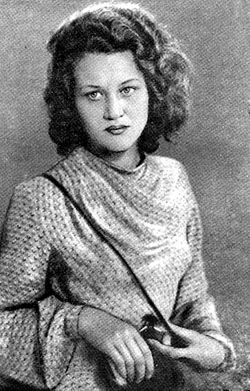
Kostenko in 1948

Lina Vasylivna Kostenko was born to a family of teachers in Rzhyshchiv. In 1936, her family moved from Rzhyshchiv to the Ukrainian capital city of Kyiv, where she finished her secondary education.

From 1937 to 1941, she studied at the Kyiv school #100, located on Trukhaniv Island, where her family lived. The school, in addition to the rest of the village, were burned by Nazi forces in 1943. The poem I Grew Up in Kyivan Venice is devoted to these events.

After graduating from high school, she studied at the Kyiv Pedagogical Institute, and later at the Maxim Gorky Literature Institute in Moscow, from where she graduated with distinction in 1956.

== Sixtiers movement ==
Kostenko was one of the first and most important figures of the Sixtiers movement of the 1950s and 1960s. Her poetry is typically lyrical and sophisticated, but also relies heavily on aphorisms, colloquialisms, and satirical language, and is typically critical of authoritarianism.

Kostenko has been credited with reviving lyric poetry in the Ukrainian language, and has been called one of Ukraine's greatest female poets. Ivan Koshelivets, Ukrainian émigré scholar, referred to her writing as "unprecedented" for its deviation from socialist realism.

In the early 1960s, she took part in the literary evenings of the Kyiv Creative Youth Club. Following her graduation, she published three collections of poetry: Earthly Rays in 1957, Sails in 1958, and Journeys of the Heart in 1961. The poems became immensely popular among Ukrainian readers. She was criticized by Soviet critics for her ideologically nonconformist attitude and her conscious avoidance of the principles of socialist realism imposed by the Communist Party. The government of the Soviet Union forced her into silence as she was unwilling to submit to Soviet authorities who censored her poems.

=== Conflict with the Soviet government ===
In 1961, she was criticised for "apoliticism." In 1963, The Star Integral poetry collection was removed from print, while another collection of poems, The Prince's Mountain, was removed from typography. During these years, Kostenko's poems were published in Czechoslovak magazines and Polish newspapers. However, they only occasionally reached Ukrainian audiences, mostly via samizdat.

In 1965, Kostenko signed a letter of protest against arrests of the Ukrainian intelligentsia. She was present at the trial of Mykhailo Osadchyi and Myroslava Zvarychevska in Lviv. During the trial of the Horyn brothers, she threw them flowers. Together with Ivan Drach, she appealed to the editorial office of the magazine "Zhovten" (now "Dzvin") and to the Lviv writers with a proposal to speak out in defence of the arrested. The writers did not dare to protest, but filed a lawsuit with the request to admit Bohdan Horyn on bail as the youngest of arrested. These efforts did not influence the trials, although they influenced the morale of Ukrainian dissidents at the time.

In May 1966, in the National Writers' Union of Ukraine, where the "nationalist outlaws" were labelled, a part of the youth held the ovation of Kostenko, who defended her position and defended Ivan Svitlichny, Opanas Zalyvaha, Myhajlo Kosiv and Bohdan Horyn. In 1967 Omeljan Pritsak nominated Kostenko and Ivan Drach for the Nobel Prize in Literature along with the older Ukrainian poet and politician Pavlo Tychyna. As of 2025, it appeared that among the nominees submitted from 1901 to 1974 – publicly available due to 50-year secrecy period, Lina Kostenko is one of only the four living.

In 1968, she wrote letters in defence of Viacheslav Chornovil in response to the defamation against him in the newspaper "Literary Ukraine." After that, the name of Lina Kostenko was not mentioned in the Soviet press for many years. She worked "in the drawer", knowing that her works were not going to be published.

In 1973 Lina Kostenko was blacklisted by Secretary of the Central Committee on Ideology of the Communist Party of Ukraine Valentyn Malanchuk. Only in 1977, after the departure of Malanchuk, was her collection of poems On the Banks of the Eternal River published, and in 1979, under a special decree of the Presidium of the Socialist-Revolutionary Guard, one of her greatest works was published, a historical novel in the verses Marusia Churai (about a 17th-century Ukrainian folk singer) which had stagnated with recognition for 6 years. She was awarded the Taras Shevchenko National Prize of the Ukrainian SSR in 1987.

Kostenko also wrote collections of poems Originality (1980) and Garden of Unthawed Sculptures (1987), a collection of poems for children, titled The Lilac King (1987).

== Life in independent Ukraine ==
In 1991, Kostenko moved to the Chornobyl Exclusion Zone, saying that she wished to "gain strength," though she cautioned others against doing so. Following the death of her husband Vasyl Tsvirkunov in 2000, she went into a hiatus from writing.

In 2010, Notes of a Ukrainian Madman was released. It was her first novel, and her first book since her 1989 Selected Works. The release of Notes was intended to be followed by a book tour across Ukraine, but abruptly ended in Lviv, allegedly after Kostenko had been offended either by Lviv residents selling tickets to the presentation (which was intended to be free) or by critics who disliked the book.

And you thought that Ukraine was so easy to understand? Ukraine is great. Ukraine is exclusive. Throughout history, others have bulldozed through Ukraine. Ukraine has endured endless trials and tribulations. My country is tough. In today’s world, that’s priceless!

— Lina Kostenko

In 2005, an attempt was made by then-President Viktor Yushchenko to decorate Kostenko as a Hero of Ukraine, the highest reward of the state. However, Kostenko refused the award, declaring, "I will not wear political jewellery."

Amidst the 2022 Russian invasion of Ukraine, Kostenko criticized the usage of obscene language and publicly opposed its appearance in the media, on billboards, and postage stamps. This was primarily a reaction to slogan "Russian warship, go fuck yourself," which became very popular in Ukraine in response to the Russian invasion. Kostenko felt the slogan, and its use of Russian language vulgarity, reflected poorly on Ukraine and the beauty of the Ukrainian language, stating: "there is, perhaps, no other such thing [as the Ukrainian language] in the whole world. The language is a nightingale, while the devil is blabbering on."

== In popular culture ==
During the 2026 Winter Olympics, Ukrainian short track speed skater Oleh Handei included a line of Kostenko's poetry on his helmet that read, "Where there is heroism, there is no final defeat." He was ordered to remove it on grounds that it was a political slogan. Handei questioned the decision and asserted it was a personal motto. He explained, "A person whose words I respect, whom I follow, where there is no hint of war. It's not allowed. I tried to argue — they made it clear to me that it was better not to do so."

== Awards and honours ==
- Taras Shevchenko National Prize (1987, for the novel "Marusya Churai" and the collection "Uniqueness")
- Antonovych prize (1989)
- Honorary professorship from the National University of Kyiv-Mohyla Academy.
- Honorary doctorates from Lviv and Chernivtsi universities.
- Asteroid 290127 Linakostenko, discovered at the Andrushivka Astronomical Observatory in 2005, was named in her honor. The official naming citation was published by the Minor Planet Centre on 2 June 2015 (M.P.C. 94391).

== Bibliography ==
=== List of publications (chronologically) ===
- Rays of the Earth (1957)
- "Sails" (1958)
- "Journeys of the Heart" (1961)
- "Knyazha Gora" (1972, the collection was not released due to a ban by Soviet censorship)
- "On the banks of the eternal river" (1977)
- "Marusya Churai" (Kyiv: Soviet writer, 1979, reprint 1982, 1990, 2018)
- "Uniqueness" (1980)
- "Garden of non-melting sculptures" (1987)
- "Elder King" (1987) - for children
- "The Chosen One" (1987)
- "Incrustations" (1994, edition in Italian, awarded the Petrarch Prize)
- "Berestechko" (Kyiv: Ukrainian writer, 1999, reprint 2007, 2010)
- "Notes of the Ukrainian self-made man" (2010)
- "River of Heraclitus" (2011)
- "Madonna Crossroads" (2011)
- "Three hundred poems. Selected poems" (2012)

=== Famous works ===
- Rays of the Earth (1957)
- Sails (1958)
- Wandering of the Heart (1961)
- Berestechko (verse novel written in 1960s, first published in 1999)
- On the Shore of the Eternal River (1977)
- Originality (1980)
- Marusia Churai (verse novel, 1979)
- Garden of Unthawed Sculptures (1987)
- The King of the Lilacs (1987)
- Selected Works (1989)
- Notes of a Ukrainian Madman (novel, Kyiv: A-ba-ba-ha-la-ma-ha, 2010, reprint 2011, 2012)

== See also ==
- List of Ukrainian-language poets
- List of Ukrainian women writers
