= Ivan Malkovych =

Ukrainian poet and publisher

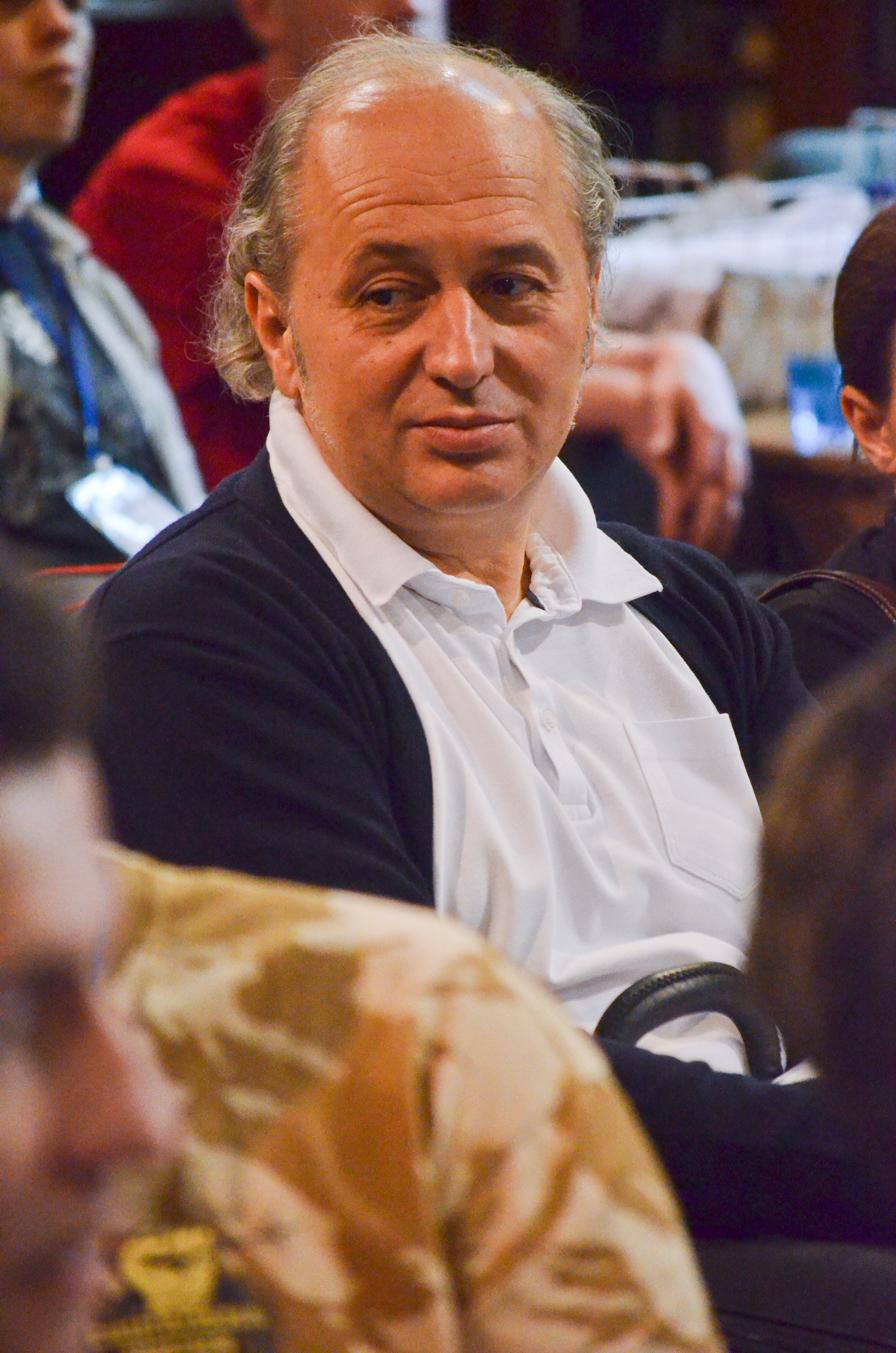
Malkovych in 2014

Ivan Antonovych Malkovych (Ukrainian: Іван Антонович Малкович; born 10 May 1961) is a noted Ukrainian poet and publisher. He is the proprietor of the publishing house "A-BA-BA-HA-LA-MA-HA", which specializes in high quality (often illustrated) editions of Ukrainian literature and poetry, and has been a winner of many industry awards. Laureate of the Shevchenko National Prize in 2017.

== Biography ==
Malkovych was born in Nyzhnii Bereziv, Ivano-Frankivsk.

He completed his studies as a violinist at the Music college in Ivano-Frankivsk before entering Kyiv University in 1978, where he majored in Ukrainian philology. He was noted by poet Dmytro Pavlychko who took him under his wing.

Malkovych was closely associated with the first Canadian-Ukrainian joint venture known as Kobza and was involved in the setting up of the Chervona Ruta festival of contemporary Music held in Chernivtsi in 1989.

== Career ==
Malkovych published 6 collections of his own verse:

- "White Stone" («Білий камінь» 1984)
- "The Key" («Ключ» 1988)
- "Poems" («Вірші» (1992)
- "An Angel on my Shoulder" («Із янголом на плечі» 1997)
- "Winter Poems" («Вірші на зиму» (2006)
- "All that's near" («Все поруч» (2010)

== Awards ==
- Order of the Smile (2004, Poland).
- Taras Shevchenko National Prize of Ukraine of 2017 — for the book of poetry "Podorozhnyk with New Poems"
