= A-ba-ba-ha-la-ma-ha =

- Parent company: A-ba-ba-ha-la-ma-ha
- Founded: 1992; 34 years ago
- Founder: Ivan Malkovych
- Country of origin: Ukraine
- Headquarters location: Kyiv
- Official website: Official website

Ivan Malkovych's Publishing House "A-ba-ba-ha-la-ma-ha" is a Ukrainian publishing house that was founded in 1992, becoming the first private children's book publisher in independent Ukraine. It started to publish books for a wider range of readers in 2008. Ivan Malkovych is a founder, as well as director and the main editor. He controls the publishing of each and every book from its manuscript to the final printing process.

== History ==
The publishing house name derives from a phrase "a-ba-ba-ha-la-ma-ha" firstly used in Ivan Franko's short story Hrytseva shkilna nauka (Hryts's Schooling), whose main character learns how to read by syllables using the phrase "a-ba-ba-ha-la-ma-ha" (stands for A baba halamaha, which literally means And a grandma is a blabbermouth).

The publishing house for children from 2 to 102 presented its first title The Ukrainian Alphabet in July 1992. As Ivan Malkovych stated: "At first I didn't think of the publishing house, all I had in mind was an alphabet book starting with the word Angel. I didn't want it to be words like Autobus and Akula (Shark) or whatever on purpose. I wanted my book to start with the Angel."

A New York publishing house Alfred A. Knopf purchased a publication rights of the A-ba-ba-ha-la-ma-ha's children book The Kitten and the Rooster in 1995. It was the first time a notable Western publisher expressed its interest in a book of a Ukrainian publishing house.

Following the success in The Moscow International Book Fair in 2001, Malkovych decided to open a branch office in Russia, which was established in Moscow in 2004. The publishing house commenced publishing books in Russian, that were not to be distributed in Ukraine.

The new Ukrainian translation of Hamlet executed by Yuri Andrukhovych was published in 2008, for which the publishing house received a Grand Prix of Ukrainian contest The Best Book of The Lviv Publishers' Forum.

A-ba-ba-ha-la-ma-ha published more than 100 titles with a total circulation of more than 4,000,000 copies. It has also sold the publishing rights for its books to 19 foreign countries.

The director of A-ba-ba-ha-la-ma-ha Ivan Malkovych claimed that there was a failed raider attack on the publishing house's office in November 2011.

== Authors ==
A-ba-ba-ha-la-ma-ha publishes prominent authors of the past and present, Ukrainian and foreign, in their own translation. Yuriy Andrukhovych, Mykola Vinhranovsky, Lina Kostenko, Sashko Dermansky, Maryna and Serhiy Dyachenko, Andriy Kokotiukha, Vsevolod Nestayko, Dmytro Pavlychko, Volodymyr Rutkivskyi, Oleksandr Havrosh, and Yuriy Vynnychuk have collaborated with the publishing house.

The translations of foreign authors for the publishing house were done by Yuriy Andrukhovych, Viktor Morozov, Roman Osadchuk, Yevhen Popovych, Yuriy Vynnychuk, and Valentyn Kornienko. Mrs. Yushchenko translated into English the book “Honey for Mom” by Ivan Malkovych and Sofia Us.

== See also ==
- List of publishing companies of Ukraine
