= Mass in D major (Dvořák) =

Composition by Antonín Dvořák

Mass in D major Lužany Mass
- by Antonín Dvořák
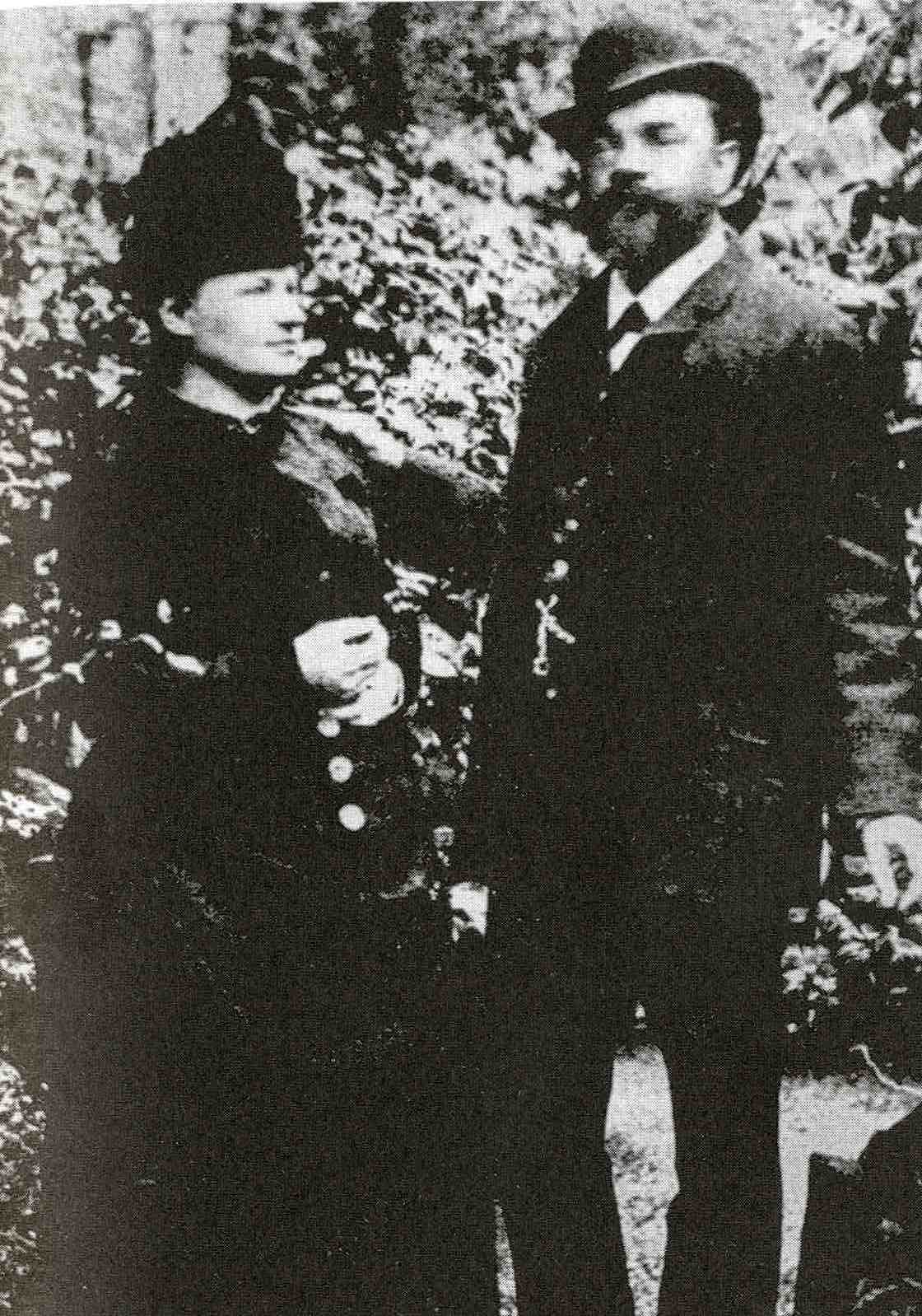
- Antonín Dvořák
- Catalogue: B. 153 and 175
- Opus: 86
- Text: mass ordinary
- Language: Latin
- Composed: 1887
- Performed: 11 September 1887: Lužany
- Published: 1893
- Movements: six
- Vocal: SATB choir and soloists
- Instrumental: organ or orchestra

The Mass in D major (German: Messe D-Dur), Op. 86, is a mass composed by Antonín Dvořák in 1887. It is also called Lužanská mše (Lužany Mass) after the chapel in Lužany for which it was written. It was first a work for soloists, choir and organ (B 153), and expanded to an orchestra version in 1892 (B 175).

== History ==
Antonín Dvořák was commissioned to compose a mass by the architect and patron Josef Hlávka for the inauguration of the chapel that he had built for his summer residence in Lužany. Because of the size of the chapel, the choir had to be small, and no orchestra was possible. Dvořák composed the work from 23 March and 17 June 1887. On the day of completion, he wrote to Hlávka:

I am pleased to announce that I have finished the work and that I am supremely pleased with the result. I think it will be a work that will fully suit its purpose. It could be called: faith, hope and love for God Almighty, and an expression of thanks for this great gift, for having been given the opportunity successfully to complete a work in praise of the Highest, and in honour of our art. Do not be surprised that I am so devout, but an artist who is not cannot achieve anything like this. Take the examples of Beethoven, Bach, Raphael and many others. I would also like to thank you for giving me the impulse to write a work of this genre, it would hardly have occurred to me otherwise; until now I had only written similar works of larger proportions with considerable means at my disposal.

He expressed that he was satisfied with the work for modest forces, which he thought could be subtitled Faith, Hope and Love ("Glaube, Hoffnung und Liebe"), and be understood as giving thanks to God. He mentioned other artists he regarded as motivated by Christian faith: Beethoven, Bach and Raphael.

The mass was first performed at the chapel on 11 September 1887, conducted by the composer. Zdenka Hlávka, the architect's wife, and Dvořák's wife Anna were among the soloists. The first public performance was on 15 April 1888 at the municipal theatre of Plzeň, now with an ensemble of two harmoniums, cello and double bass.

The mass is numbered Op. 76 in the autograph, but his publisher Fritz Simrock gave this number to the Fifth Symphony. Simrock was not interested in the mass. It was published in 1893 by Novello in London as Op. 86, with an orchestration by the composer. This version was first performed on 11 March 1893 at the London Crystal Palace, conducted by August Manns. The organ version was published by R. Carl in Saarbrücken in 1963. Bärenreiter published a critical edition of the organ version, including the added parts for cello and bass, regarded as authentic by the composer.

== Scoring ==
Organ version (1887):

- Soloists: soprano, alto, tenor, bass
- Choir SATB
- Organ

Orchestral version (1892):

- Soloists and small choir SATB
- 2 oboes, 2 bassoons, 3 horns, 2 trumpets, 3 trombones, timpani, string instruments, organ

== Structure ==
The work is structured as the mass text prescribes, with most parts performed by both soloists and choir. It takes about 40 minutes to perform.

1. Kyrie (Andante con moto) 2. Gloria (Allegro vivace) 3. Credo (Allegro ma non troppo) 4. Sanctus (Allegro maestoso) 5. Benedictus (Lento) 6. Agnus Dei (Andante)

The work is intentionally kept simple. It is basically written for choir, with only occasional lines for soloists, and technically not difficult. The composer achieves expressiveness with simple means, such as folksong-like tunes in rich harmonies.
