= Josef Hlávka =

Czech architect

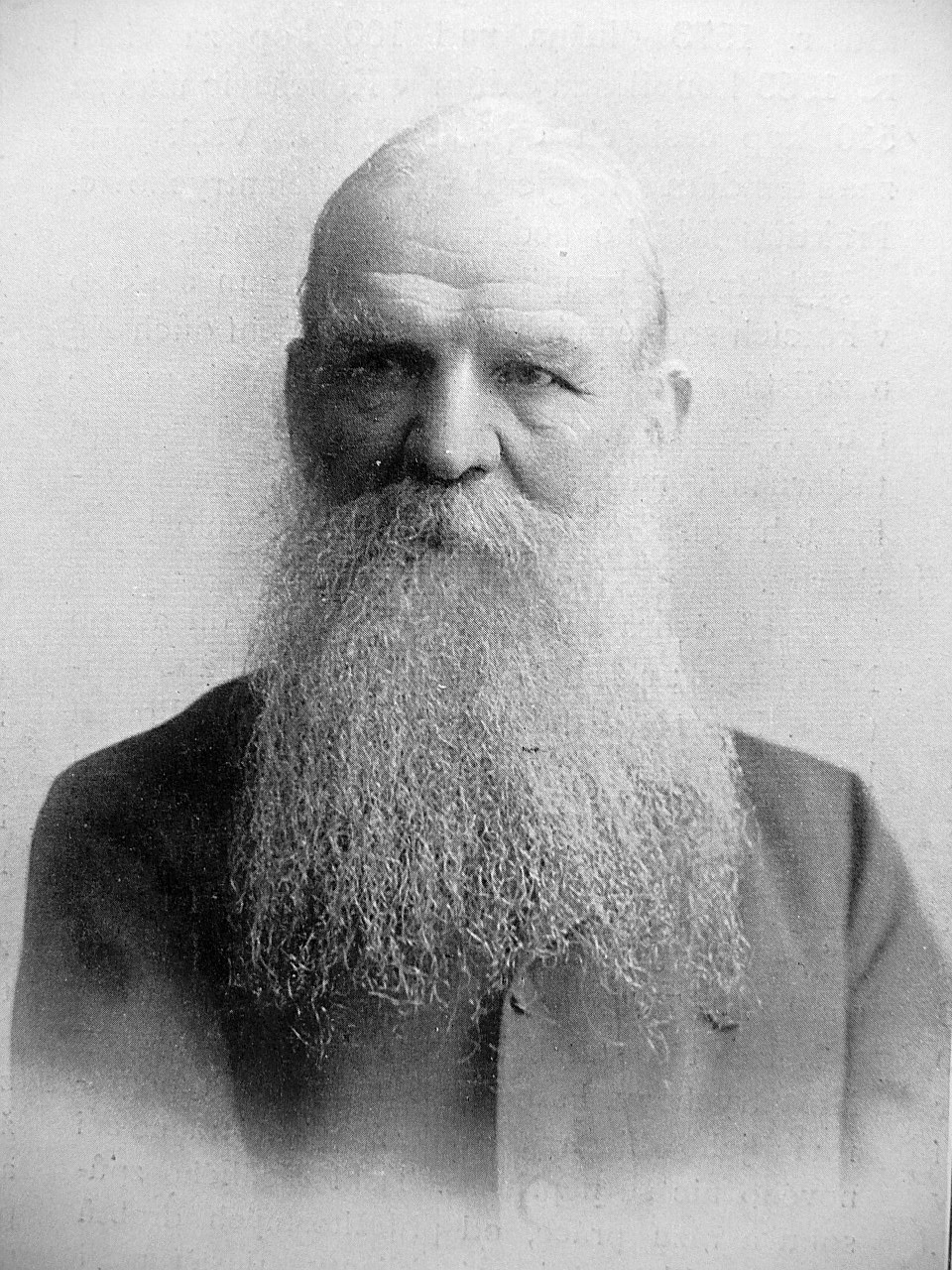
- Hlávka in 1908
- Born: 15 February 1831; Přeštice, Bohemia, Austrian Empire
- Died: 11 March 1908 (aged 77); Prague, Bohemia, Austria-Hungary
- Occupations: architect, builder
- Known for: Hlávka Foundation

Josef Hlávka (15 February 1831 – 11 March 1908) was an architect, builder, philanthropist and founder of the oldest foundation for sciences and arts in Bohemia.

== Biography ==
He was the second-born son of Mayor Antonín Hlávka and his wife, Anna née Stachová, from a noble family. After completing his secondary education at the Realschule in Prague, he studied general and structural engineering at Prague Polytechnic (now the Czech Technical University), from 1847 to 1851. He then spent three years studying architecture at the Academy of Fine Arts in Vienna. This was followed by an apprenticeship in masonry at the contracting firm of Franz Schebek, where he became office manager in 1855. His first design was a funerary monument for Schebek's wife.

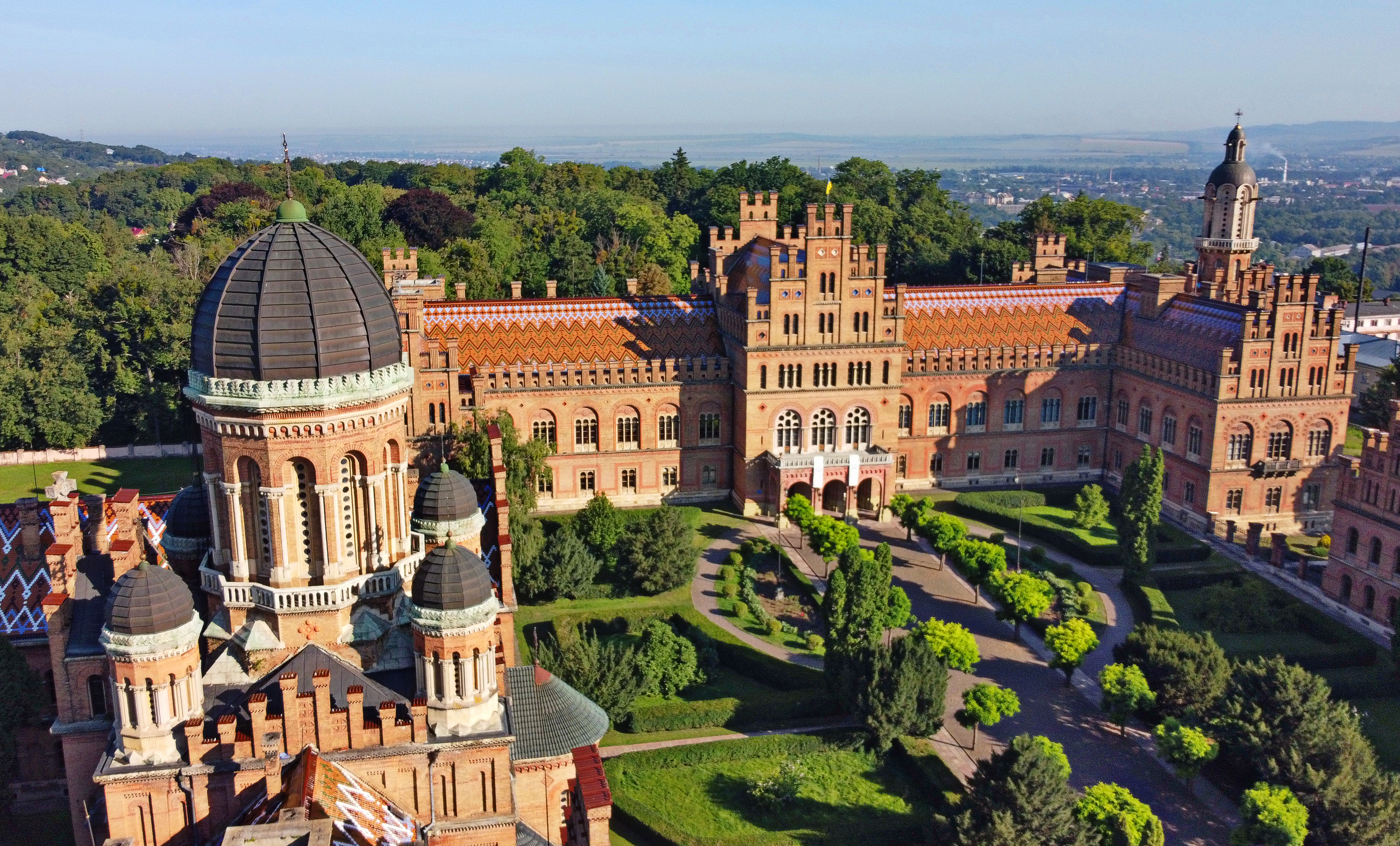
Residence of Bukovinian and Dalmatian Metropolitans, Chernivtsi.

The following year, he received a scholarship for a three-year study trip throughout Europe. Upon its completion, he chose to settle in Vienna. When Schebek retired, he left his business to Hlávka. A successfully executed construction contract at the new Lazarist Church established his reputation. Over the next few years, he was awarded over 140 commissions for private works, as well as several public projects, including the Vienna State Opera. In 1864, he began construction on the "Residence of Bukovinian and Dalmatian Metropolitans" in Czernowitz, which has since been designated a UNESCO World Heritage Site.

He also made a name for himself as a preservationist, and was named a curator for the Austrian central commission dealing with monuments. In 1866, he became a member of the Academy. His numerous commitments led to a strenuous schedule, a nervous breakdown in 1869, and a progressive paralysis of his legs. He was forced to give up his company in 1873, and move to an estate in Lužany, originally owned by his mother and not far from his birthplace.

He devoted his energies to promoting Czech science and art. By 1880, he was sufficiently recovered to resume his public works. His wife, Marie, died of tuberculosis in 1882. He remarried a few years later, to Zdenka Havelková, a pianist and singer who helped him promote the arts. His estate, which he gradually rebuilt, became a popular meeting spot for various writers and composers. Antonín Dvořák was a close friend, and composed his Mass in D Major to celebrate the inauguration of a new chateau in Lužany.

In the late 1880s, he began a campaign to establish an academy of arts and sciences. As a result of this, and some substantial donations he made, the Royal Bohemian Emperor Franz Joseph Academy for Science, Literature and Art was established in 1890, and opened its doors in 1891. It was in existence, under different names, until 1952. Hlávka served as its first President. In the following years, he would be a generous donator to several institutes and foundations; notably for a student dormitory for gifted but poor students

He was also involved in politics; being elected to the Chamber of Deputies in the Reichsrat in 1883, representing the "Old Czech Party" (officially, the National Party). He became a lifetime member in 1891, appointed by Emperor Franz Joseph I.

He remained childless through both marriages. When Zdenka died, in 1904, he donated his entire fortune to create the "Josef, Marie and Zdenka Hlávka Foundation". It survived the Communist régime, the only pre-Communist foundation to do so, and is still devoted to promoting the intellectual culture of the Czech people. His death came after a short illness in 1908, and he was interred in a family grave of his own design.

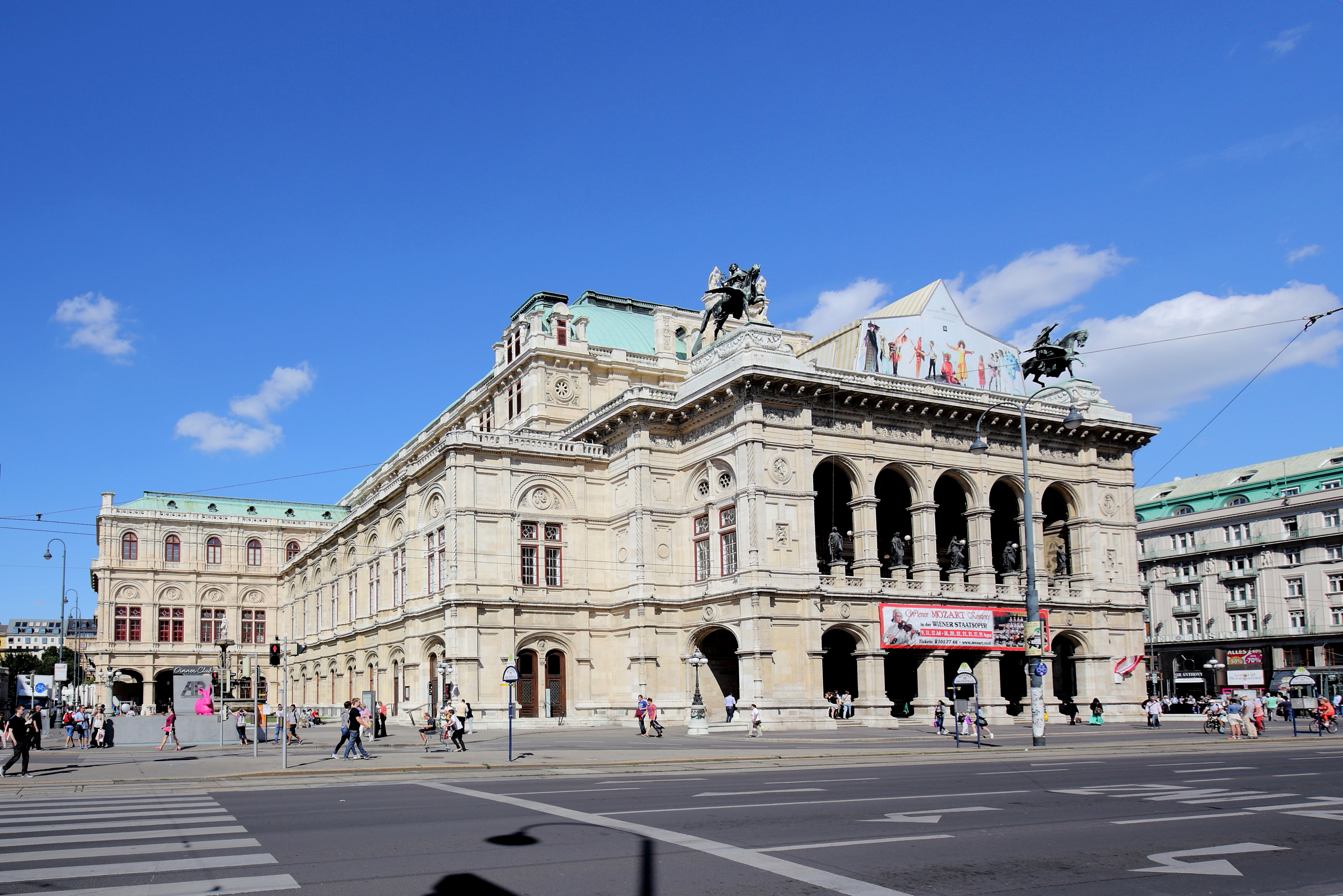
The Vienna State Opera

== Sources ==
- "Hlávka Josef". In: Österreichisches Biographisches Lexikon 1815–1950 (ÖBL). Vol. 2, Austrian Academy of Sciences, Vienna 1959, p. 341.
- Josef Hlávka. In: Architektenlexikon Wien 1770–1945. Published by the Vienna Architecture Centre. Vienna 2007.
- Alois Lodr: Josef Hlávka - český architekt, stavitel a mecenáš, Melantrich, Prague, 1988
- Wolfgang Bahr: "Josef Hlávka - ein tschechischer Architekt, Baumeister und Mäzen im alten Österreich", in: Österreich in Geschichte und Literatur, #48, Vol.6, pp. 356–374
- * "Hlávka, Josef", short biography @ the Österreichisches Parlament
