= Lužany (Plzeň-South District) =

- Municipality
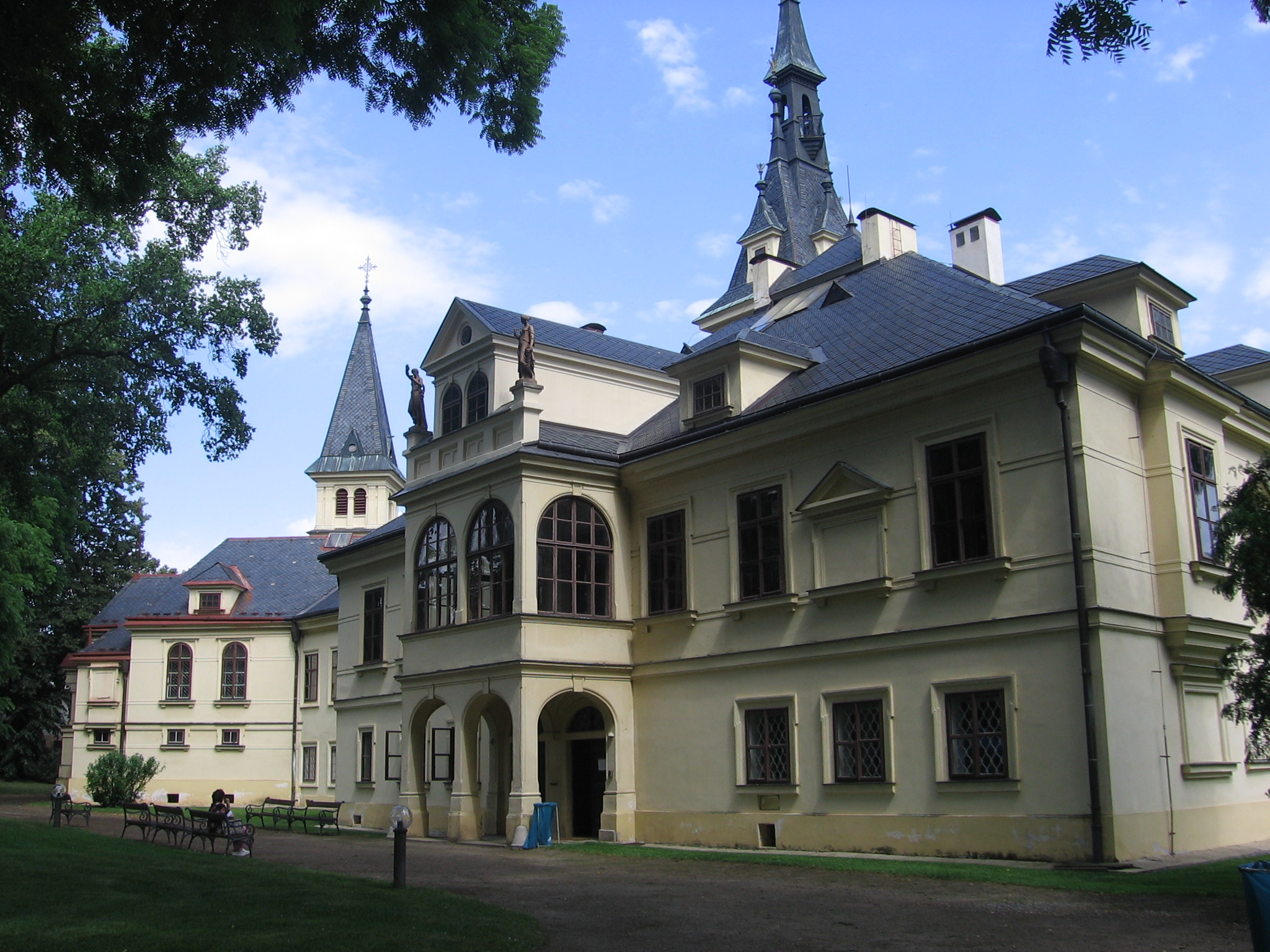
- Lužany Castle

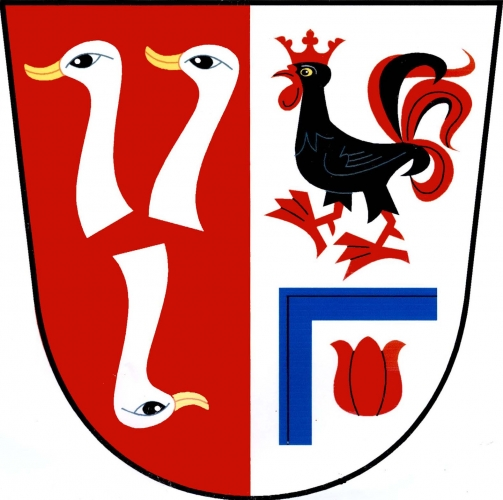
- Flag Coat of arms

- Location in the Czech Republic
- Coordinates: 49°32′48″N 13°18′57″E
- Country: Czech Republic
- Region: Plzeň
- District: Plzeň-South
- First mentioned: 1175

Area
  - Total: 9.44 km^{2} (3.64 sq mi)
- Elevation: 358 m (1,175 ft)

Population (2026-01-01)
  - Total: 723
  - Density: 76.6/km^{2} (198/sq mi)
- Time zone: UTC+1 (CET)
  - Summer (DST): UTC+2 (CEST)
- Postal codes: 334 01, 334 54
- Website: www.obec-luzany.cz

Lužany is a municipality and village in Plzeň-South District in the Plzeň Region of the Czech Republic. It has about 700 inhabitants.

Lužany lies approximately 23 kilometres (14 mi) south of Plzeň and 100 km (62 mi) south-west of Prague.

== Administrative division ==
Lužany consists of four municipal parts (in brackets population according to the 2021 census):

- Lužany (453)
- Dlouhá Louka (122)
- Zelená Hora (20)
- Zelené (62)

== Demographics ==
Historical population
Year	Pop.	±%
1869	810	—
1880	1,027	+26.8%
1890	967	−5.8%
1900	927	−4.1%
1910	997	+7.6%
1921	971	−2.6%
1930	1,079	+11.1%
1950	927	−14.1%
1961	862	−7.0%
1970	848	−1.6%
1980	731	−13.8%
1991	665	−9.0%
2001	673	+1.2%
2011	617	−8.3%
2021	657	+6.5%
Source: Censuses
