= Constantin Isopescu-Grecul =

Romanian politician, jurist, and journalist (1871–1938)

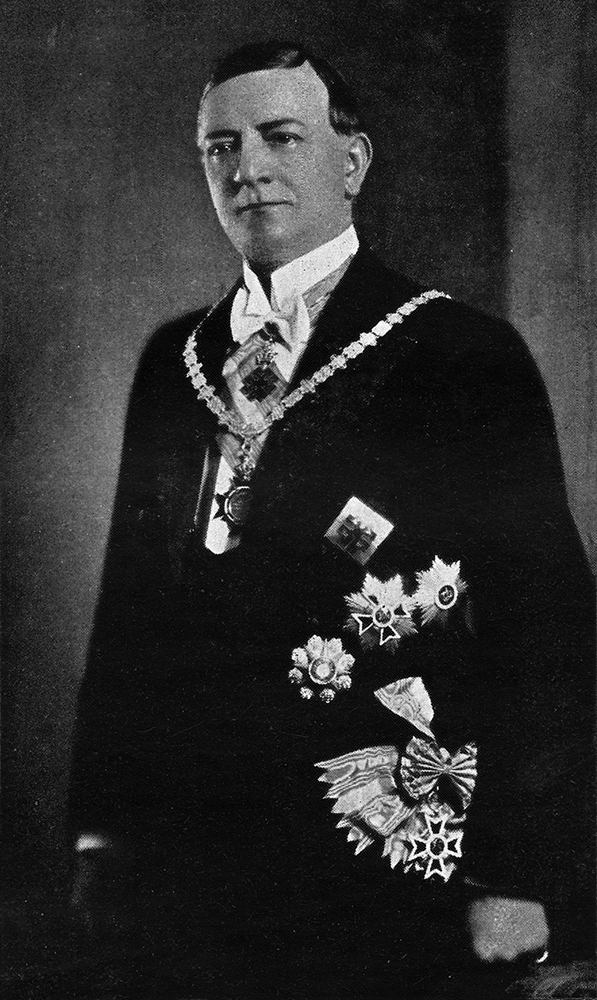
- Isopescu-Grecul in 1933

Reichsabgeordneter
- In office 1907–1918
- Constituency: Storozynetz—Bojan—Czernowitz

Member of the Assembly of Deputies of Romania
- In office December 12, 1928 – May 1930
- Constituency: Cernăuți County

Member of the Senate of Romania
- In office May 1930 – 1933

Personal details
- Born: Constantin Isopescu; February 2, 1871 Czernowitz (Cernăuți), Duchy of Bukovina, Austria-Hungary
- Died: March 29, 1938 (aged 67) Cernăuți, Kingdom of Romania
- Party: Concordia Society (1890s, 1909, ca. 1911–1923); Romanian National People's Party (ca. 1907, 1911, 1923, 1925); Independent Party (1908–1909); Romanian National Party (1923–1925); Democratic Nationalist Party (ca. 1925); National Peasants' Party (1926–1938)
- Relations: Dimitrie Isopescu (father)
- Profession: Jurist, journalist, industrialist
- Awards: Order of the Crown of Romania: Grand Cross; Order of the Crown of Romania: Grand Officer; Order of Ferdinand I: Grand Officer; Order of Pope Pius IX: Commander; Order of Franz Joseph: Commander

Constantin Ritter von Isopescu-Grecul (or cavaler de Isopescu-Grecul; first name also Konstantin or Tăchiță, last name also Isopescul-Grecul, Isopescu Grecu, Iosipescu Grecul; Ukrainian: Константин Ісопискуль-Грекуль; February 2, 1871 – March 29, 1938) was an Austro-Hungarian-born Romanian jurist, politician, and journalist. He represented the Duchy of Bukovina and a Romanian constituency in the Austrian House of Deputies continuously from 1907, participating in the political events of World War I. He was foremost known as a legal reformer and a political moderate, who objected to radical forms of Romanian nationalism and mainly sought to obtain a special status for the Romanians within a reformed Austria. His loyalism was rewarded by the Austrian authorities and antagonized the Romanian National People's Party, but Isopescu-Grecul also took distance from the pro-Austrian line advocated by Aurel Onciul. In 1908, Isopescu-Grecul joined Nicu Flondor and Teofil Simionovici in creating an Independent Party, which espoused a moderate program. He later rallied behind Iancu Flondor, embracing his conservative approach to national issues.

He was drawn closer to nationalism during the world war. He denounced the persecution of Romanians in Transylvania, and was disappointed by Austria's offer to merge Bukovina into a Ukrainian People's Republic. In late 1918, he still contemplated autonomy or independence for Bukovina and Transylvania, rather than union with the Kingdom of Romania, promoting Wilsonianism. When public order broke down in Vienna, he and Iuliu Maniu organized defense units of Romanians from the Common Army, which doubled as a police force. The process of union between Bukovina–Transylvania and Romania having been initiated, Isopescu-Grecul accepted the outcome. He continued to serve as Romanian envoy in Vienna and Prague throughout the dissolution of Austria-Hungary, and for most of the Hungarian–Romanian War. He favored forging a long-lasting alliance between Romania and the Hungarian conservative forces; he also circulated proposals for a Hungarian–Romanian federation.

In 1920, Isopescu-Grecul made his way back to Bukovina, an adviser of the Romanian governments and an investor in forestry businesses. He made a return to politics in the 1920s: after helping to absorb Flondor's group into Maniu's Romanian National Party, he left the group to join Nicolae Iorga's Democratic Nationalists; he then defected back to Maniu's group. A direct participant in talks to merge the latter with the Peasants' Party, he became a regional leader of the resulting National Peasants' Party. Isopescu-Grecul also served briefly in the Assembly of Deputies, and was one of its six vice presidents—though his election to that position was tinged by controversy. In 1930–1933, he held the office of rector of Czernowitz University, an institution which he also represented in the Senate of Romania. During this interval, he helped the authorities in quelling racial riots opposing Christian and Jewish students. Just before his death, he parted with Maniu and gave his endorsement to a new authoritarian regime, formed by King Carol II.

== Biography ==
=== Early life and career ===
Born into a noble ethnic Romanian family in Czernowitz (Cernăuți), his father Dimitrie was a high school principal and conservationist, and his paternal grandfather a Romanian Orthodox priest. Constantin's mother Aglaia Constantinovici-Grecul was the daughter of Ghideon Ritter von Grecul, who variously served as an archimandrite and as a high government official. Constantin had three siblings: Aurelia, a sister, who married the Austrian academic Johann Wenzel Patz; brothers Emanoil, Eusebie and Gheorghe—respectively, a professor, a physician, and a career soldier. Constantin alone was adopted by his maternal uncle, Temistocle Grecul, and therefore had a distinguishing compound surname. He attended school in his native city, then enrolling in Czernowitz University.

On Christmas Day 1885, Isopescu-Grecul appeared in the Romanian play Florin și Florica, produced by an amateur troupe of Romanians in Bukovina. He shared the stage with Aglaea Drogli and her son George; Aglaea's brother, the celebrated poet Mihai Eminescu, was in the audience. On March 23, 1890, the young man was voted in as vice president of Societatea Academică Junimea student society; fellow law student Dimitrie Tușinschi became treasurer. Around 1892, he was a contributor to the Bukovinian–Romanian press, with articles in Încercări Literare, and later in Gazeta Bucovinei. These he signed as Constantin Verdi, or just Verdi. Also under this signature, he published his first and only poetry pieces. Having received a law doctorate in 1897, young Isopescu-Grecul entered the magistracy, serving as court clerk in Gura Humorului for a time before becoming a prosecutor in Czernowitz. From 1905, he was assistant professor of criminal law at his alma mater, rising to full professor in 1909.

Isopescu-Grecul also ran a law practice in Vienna, the Austro-Hungarian capital. He married in 1897, and had a son and a daughter. Also in 1897, he made his debut in politics, as one of the founding members of the Bukovina National Romanian Party, centered on Iancu Flondor and Concordia Society. His journalistic work saw print in virtually every newspaper and magazine in Czernowitz, but also in Romanian publications in other parts of Austria-Hungary (Tribuna, Vatra) and in the Kingdom of Romania (Convorbiri Literare, Neamul Românesc). The latter were sometimes signed as Un român bucovinean ("A Bukovinian Romanian"). His scholarly works focused on attempts to regulate predatory lending, which was a main topic of legal and economic concern in his region. He published his work on "usury" and the Austrian penal code in 1906.

Before his death from heart disease in May 1901, Dimitrie had served as a Duchy of Bukovina representative in the Austrian House of Deputies. He was affiliated with the Conservative (or "Pactist") Party, headed by Ioan Volcinschi. A member of the breakaway Romanian National People's Party (PNPR) in its new avatar, the Apărărist group, Constantin took over for his father, and ran in the House at the Austrian election of 1907 for Czernowitz, Storozynetz and Bojan. He only took the latter two constituencies after winning a runoff against Ioan Iancu Cuparencu, of the Democratic Peasants' Party; in the first round, they had both beaten George Grigorovici, of the Bukovina Socialists.

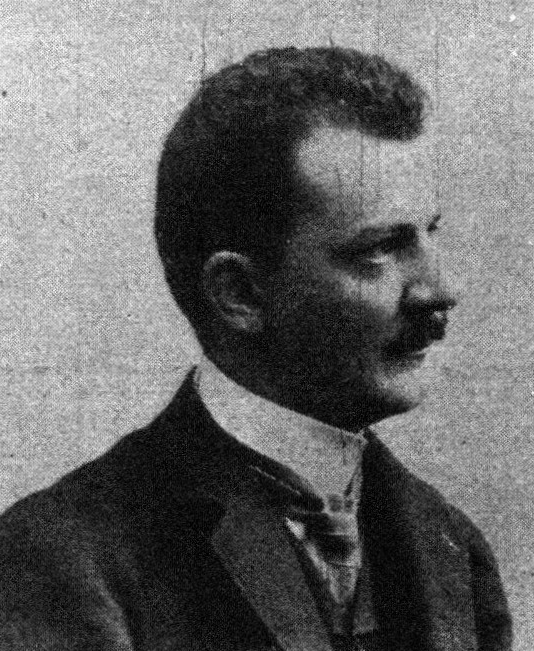
Isopescu-Grecul around 1907

This became the first of Isopescu-Grecul's several terms, in a career which would see him elected as vice president of the House. He was perceived as one of Austria's most loyal Romanian subjects, founding the Independent Party, together with Nicu Flondor and Teofil Simionovici. This group emerged in October 1908, when Dorimedont Popovici expelled him from the PNPR, accusing him of opposing a reunification with the Democratic Peasantists. He himself rejected that claim, and accused Popovici of mounting a "diversion". Subsequently, the Independents occupied the middle ground between two irreconcilable approaches: the radicalized nationalism of the PNPR and Concordia, and the loyalism of the Democratic Peasantists; in addition to Isopescu-Grecul and Simionovici, they managed to enlist a third deputy in Vienna, namely Alexandru Hurmuzaki. This issue caused an uproar at Concordia: in August 1909, Popovici and Iancu Flondor staged a popular rally in Suczawa, attended by some 3,000 Romanians, and directed specifically against the "dissenting" deputies; the conservatives enlisted support from some of their former critics, including Democratic Peasantist leader Aurel Onciul, who agreed that all Romanian factions needed to be fused into one single party.

The Independents failed to survive for long, even though Isopescu-Grecul resisted any attempt at reconciliation with Concordia, and refused to hand in his resignation from the House. For much of his subsequent career, he was president of the House's four-member Romanian deputies' group in Vienna, and in 1909 co-founded a parliamentary "Latin Union"—with Hurmuzaki and various Italian deputies, also joined by Onciul. Before the end of 1909, Isopescu-Grecul briefly returned into the conservative wing of the old Concordia, under Iancu Flondor. In 1911, when all the Romanian factions briefly cooperated to block out other ethnic communities, he also secured his own election to the Diet of Bukovina, for Storozynetz. He had reconciled with Popovici and the PNPR youth wing, becoming one of the group's 7 representatives in the Diet; the Democratic Peasantists had 8, and the Conservatives, heralded by Iancu Flondor, had 5. He also retook his seat in the House in the parliamentary election of that year, again as representative for Storozynetz, Bojan, and Czernowitz. In Bojan, he defeated Florea Lupu, the Democratic Peasantist banker, during a heated campaign which saw him being injured by Lupu's voters. Isopescu-Grecul was putting out the newspaper Unirea Națională, which claimed that Lupu intended to destroy the network of Bukovinian Romanian banks.

=== World War I ===
With his background in law, Isopescu-Grecul spent much time reforming the antiquated military penal code, and helped write a new one. In 1911, he was bestowed the rank of adviser to Emperor Francis Joseph, and made a commander of the Order of Franz Joseph in September 1912. However, at home he was criticized for supporting the bill on conscription. This law gave Hungarian Transleithania increased control over much of the Austro-Hungarian Army, and, as such, harmed the agenda of Transleithanian Romanians. Elevated into Austrian nobility in June of the following year, Isopescu-Grecul was sent on a diplomatic tour of Romania, alongside Mihail Chisanovici. This was a mission prepared by Count Leopold Berchtold, the Minister President of Austria, who wanted to calm the anti-Austrian irredentism of Romanian nationalists such as Nicolae Iorga. Upon the end of the First Balkan War, Isopescu-Grecul used his contacts in Romania to promote a favorite cause: statehood for the Aromanians. Already in 1912, he had backed Dervish Hima and Andrei Balamace, who petitioned internationally for an Independent Albania with Aromanian national representation. He proposed that Romania and the Central Powers could together offer the best guarantees for the Aromanians, promoting "Romanianism" against the ambitions of Greece and Serbia.

In February 1914, a bomb exploded at the Hajdúdorog Bishopric palace in the Hungarian city of Debrecen, killing civilians. This attack, universally blamed on Romanian nationalists, was later revealed to have been done by Ilie Cătărău—a likely double agent of the Russian Empire and the Romanian Siguranța, who was trying to accelerate a crisis and bring Romania into a war with Austria-Hungary. Isopescu-Grecul responded with an op-ed in Czernowitzer Zeitung, stating his belief that "Romanian fanatics" were not responsible, but rather a false-flag operation by the "Pan-Slavists". Also in that piece, he argued for a cross-border entente between the Hungarians and the Romanians, noting that such a pact was being prepared by the Hungarian Prime Minister, István Tisza. Isopescu-Grecul maintained his support for the status-quo during the early stages of World War I, while Romania remained neutral but hostile toward Austria. He openly disapproved of Bukovinians who considered union with Romania. He also deplored the growth of anti-Austrian sentiment in Romania-proper, insisting that it was being stoked by the Russians. In November 1914, a reserve Unterleutnant in the Austro-Hungarian Army, he was promoted to Oberleutnant-Auditor by the emperor himself.

Isopescu-Grecul also began networking with Iuliu Maniu, of the more powerful Romanian National Party (PNR), which represented Romanians in Transylvania and other Hungarian-ruled provinces. According to his own testimony (publicized in 1928), he tried to protect Maniu from conscription into the Hungarian Landwehr, trying to find him employment at a military tribunal; Maniu refused, because "he'd have rather died in the trenches than accept favors from any Hungarian authorities." During 1916–1917, with Romania having joined the war on Austria-Hungary, the authorities clamped down on displays of nationalism—particularly so in Hungarian Transleithania. In his addresses in the House, Isopescu-Grecul claimed that some 6,000 Romanians had been interned as suspects, and suggested their release. Premier Tisza, his erstwhile friend, ordered the arrest of 16 Romanian nationalist leaders, 9 of whom were sentenced to death in a subsequent trial. Isopescu-Grecul took up their cause in the Viennese parliament, earning support from prominent figures such as Karl Seitz and Ignaz Seipel; they pleaded with Francis Joseph, arranging the prisoners' pardon and release. According to a 1918 report in Pesti Napló, he had also been petitioning Samu Hazai, the Hungarian Minister of Defense, that he himself be allowed to practice as a lawyer for the Transleithanian court-martial.

The movements for ethnic and regional autonomy began competing with each other over Bukovina and Galicia–Lodomeria. At Czernowitz, the Bukovina Germans proclaimed regional autonomy, a move which perplexed the Romanians. Isopescu-Grecul and his fellow deputy Simionovici requested an interview with Ernest von Koerber, the new Minister President, who praised their loyalism and assured them that Bukovina would remain in the Austrian domain. In February 1918, as premier Ernst Seidler von Feuchtenegg proposed a new budget, Isopescu-Grecul agreed to support it out of Austrian patriotism, though he publicly expressed the wish that the government would follow up with concrete measures to grant Romanian subjects their autonomy; he explained that: "the start of [Romania's] war was the saddest moment in any Bukovinian's life. Yet they never strayed away from the true path, and continued to fight for country and throne." At the time, as Romania was negotiating the terms of her surrender to Austria, Isopescu-Grecul supported a peace "without annexations and reparations", which would treat the defeated with dignity.

With the collapse of Austria-Hungary in sight, Isopescu-Grecul became more closely involved with Romanian nationalism, taking his distance from Democratic Peasantists such as Aurel Onciul. He also disapproved of Austrian plans to transfer part of Bukovina to either a Ukrainianized Galicia or to the Ukrainian People's Republic. Isopescu-Grecul publicly stated being for the preservation of "non-dismembered Bukovina". More discreetly, his party prepared for ceding Schipenitz and other northern areas to the Ukrainian state, but demanded that the rest be preserved as a Romanian homeland; this policy was acknowledged by Isopescu-Grecul in his February speech in the House, where he informed his colleagues that "the four districts in northern Bukovina [are] almost entirely inhabited by Ukrainians." Politically, Isopescu-Grecul moved back into Flondor's wing of the Concordia movement, and for a while served as nominal president of Flondor's National Party. The Treaty of Brest-Litovsk put an end to the war on the Russian Front, and returned the Austrian administration to Czernowitz. As skirmishes continued between Austro-Hungarian and Romanian armies during summer 1918, Isopescu-Grecul congratulated Emperor Charles on restoring Austrian Bukovina.

=== Vienna crisis ===
In September, Isopescu-Grecul and Simionovici informed Baron Hussarek, the Minister President, that Bukovinian Romanians felt betrayed by the regime, and no longer considered themselves loyal to the monarchy. On October 4, during an interview with the emperor, he asserted that the 4 million Romanians of Bukovina and Transylvania now wished to form their own independent state, or a single autonomous unit of Austria. While mentioned in some reports as supportive of a Danubian Federation, which had been proposed by Woodrow Wilson, he described it in his speeches as no longer feasible or desirable. On October 16, Isopescu-Grecul became head of the Romanian National Council in Vienna, which regarded itself as a constitutional assembly for Transylvania–Bukovina. It was a five-member body: the four House deputies caucusing as Romanians, joined by the Socialist Grigorovici. On the same day, Emperor Charles released his proclamation To my peoples, which promised a new political system for Cisleithania, but made virtually no mention of Bukovina's future organization.

Isopescu-Grecul obtained that the House session of October 22 be assigned to presenting the Romanian Bukovinian viewpoint. In his own speech, he referred to the Fourteen Points doctrine as a guarantee of self-determination, criticizing the emperor's "nebulous" promises; he also attacked Austria for not intervening to support the Romanian cause in Transylvania or Transleithania at large. Rejecting any offer of partition, as had most non-Ukrainian deputies for Bukovina, he declared that he looked forward to the subject being tackled at the peace conference. He then led the Romanian deputies into a rendition of Deșteaptă-te, române!, the Romanian patriotic hymn. By November 1, the empire was descending into anarchy, and German speakers in Vienna demanded a German republic of their own. As Isopescu-Grecul put it: "we expected absolute change, if not perhaps the dissolution of Austria, within three months".

Isopescu-Grecul then received Maniu in Vienna; the two of them, alongside Simionovici, formed the triumvirate leadership of the reorganized Romanian Council. Viorel Tilea and Epifane Munteanu were appointed as their secretaries. On November 1, Isopescu and Maniu visited General Stöger-Steiner, nominally in charge of the War Ministry, and demanded direct control over Romanian units in the Common Army. Stöger yielded within the hour, although he admitted that he no longer controlled the troops, which answered to a revolutionary committee. Isopescu-Grecul reported in 1928 that the general had issued a veiled threat, informing him and Maniu that they too risked being toppled by a military dictatorship, which would then proceed to shoot them. Maniu reportedly shrugged this off: "I don't feel it likely that the reactionaries could succeed, but, even if they were to, we must not falter. And then, if this is indeed a revolution, it needs its martyrs. Should they shoot us, we'll be laid side by side in our graves."

With this, the Romanian Military Senate took charge of public order in Vienna, reorganizing troops on national grounds and under a Romanian flag. According to Tilea, the Senate was able to defend the War Ministry against armed assaults by groups answering to the Communist Party. Those weeks also witnessed the Aster Revolution and the creation of a Hungarian People's Republic, as well as Romania's decision to resume her war on Austria. With an article in Polizeikorrespondenz, Isopescu-Grecul took an expected position against the Hungarian authorities, which were trying to maintain Transleithanian borders while negotiating a separate peace with Romania; he reportedly accused Oszkár Jászi, the Hungarian Minister for Minorities, of having submitted false data to downplay the numerical presence of Romanians, adding: "Jászi is now reluctant to grant the Romanians the freedom that had been promised to them." He therefore demanded that the Romanian National Council be mandated to participate in any future debates.

On November 25, Isopescu-Grecul traveled to Prague on a mission from the Romanian Council, tasked with opening up relations between Romania and newly independent Czechoslovakia. A while after, the Council dissolved itself, and its members had placed themselves at the disposal of a similarly named committee in Czernowitz, which openly campaigned for union with Romania. Isopescu-Grecul himself was elected as one of the committee's 50 members, overseeing the incorporation of Bukovina into Greater Romania. On December 1, day of the "Great Union" in which Transylvanian Romanians declared their own union with Romania, he stated his "unconditional adherence" to the unionist proclamation. In early 1919 he represented both Bukovina and Transylvania in Vienna, with the title of Commissioner for King Ferdinand I, as well as being, from February 8, Romania's first ambassador to Czechoslovakia. Simultaneously, he was head of a liquidation committee tasked with addressing litigious issues between Romania on one hand and, on the other, Republican Austria and the White Government of Hungary. Assisted by General Ioan Boeriu, he also formally dissolved the Military Senate of Vienna.

=== Hungarian mission and return to Bukovina ===
In his new capacity, Isopescu-Grecul favored an understanding with Hungarian conservatives during the War of 1919, in which Romania defeated the Hungarian Soviet Republic. In his indirect contacts with József Somssich, the conservative Minister of Foreign Affairs, he proposed a détente, noting that both their countries were threatened by Slavic encroachment. Reportedly, he described the Romanian military's conduct in Hungary as "most regrettable", and complained to his own co-nationals about the style of Romanian administration in the new regions. He also circulated rumors about a possible Hungarian–Romanian federation, as proposed to him by Hungarian landowners. In June 1919, Isopescu-Grecul noted with worry that the Hungarians were losing interest in forming a league with Romania, and were instead pondering a personal union with the Kingdom of Yugoslavia, under Alexander Karađorđević. In August, as that project came to a halt, he expressed his support for a customs union and "tight alliance" between Hungary and Romania, arguing that the two countries formed an "economic whole". Hungarian diplomatic records of the time also suggest that Isopescu-Grecul vetoed Romania's alliance with Czechoslovakia and Austria against a restored Hungarian Kingdom, because "Rumania prefers a conservative rather than a socialist government in her rear." He also agreed to allow Hungary to rearm herself and join the Allied cause against Bolshevist Russia, and promised to help restore communications between Hungary and Transylvania.

Isopescu-Grecul's mission came to an end in September 1920, when Hungary and Romania exchanged ambassadors: he arranged for Szilárd Masirevich to be recognized as the Hungarian envoy to Romania, before being himself relieved by Ambassador Traian Stârcea. In December, he began working as an adviser for the Romanian Ministry of Agriculture and Royal Domains, under Dimitrie A. Grecianu. He continued to serve as head of the liquidation committee until 1922. During the same time, he also became involved with the Bukovina wood industry, a founder (in late 1920) and Chairman of the eponymous S.A. corporation Industria Silvică din Bucovina. He was resuming his collaboration with Maniu, hoping to draw him and the PNR into an alliance with Flondor. Their politics was aimed against the centralizing National Liberal Party and its Bukovinian allies, the Democratic Unionists. He intermediated an agreement in February 1923, whereby the PNPR became a regional section of the PNR.

By early 1925, Isopescu-Grecul had revived the PNPR's sections; in April, after negotiations between him and Traian Brăileanu, he agreed to fuse these into the Democratic Nationalist Party, whose national leader was his old rival Iorga. Speaking on the occasion, he declared that all other political parties in Bukovina were "weeds" which needed to be uprooted. Isopescu-Grecul finally entered national politics during late 1926, upon rallying with Maniu's PNR. He then negotiated the merger between this group and the Peasants' Party (represented in Bukovina by Constantin Krakalia and Orest Bodnărescu); the resulting National Peasants' Party (PNȚ) had him as head organizer for Cernăuți County. He was subsequently elected vice president of the PNȚ chapter in Bukovina, and became a host of its national congress in Alba Iulia (May 1928).

Isopescu-Grecul then ran in the general election of 1928, winning a seat in the Assembly of Deputies after the party's landslide victory. His was one of four taken by the PNȚ in Cernăuți County—a list headed by Teofil Sauciuc-Săveanu. In this capacity, he advised the new Ministry of Transport on the supervision of the private railways. In November 1929, he was made a Commander of the Order of Pope Pius IX by the Holy See. On November 18, 1930, Isopescu-Grecul put himself up as a candidate for one of the six vice presidential seats in the Assembly, winning by 92 votes. According to his political adversaries at Glasul Bucovinei, the PNȚ forced his victory by stuffing the urn with ballots. The Iași-based newspaper Lumea attributed this claim to deputy Vasile Georgescu Bârlad, who had seen suspicious behavior from Ștefan Cicio Pop, the Assembly President. Cicio Pop was outraged by this claim, and sent Georgescu Bârlad to be tried by a committee on discipline; according to Lumea, Georgescu Bârlad's accusation was not implausible, since Isopescu-Grecul had received "the exact number of votes" he needed. Georgescu Bârlad went on to accuse Sever Dan of having personally arranged the fraudulent election. On November 19, Dan challenged his accuser to a duel.

=== Rector and retiree ===
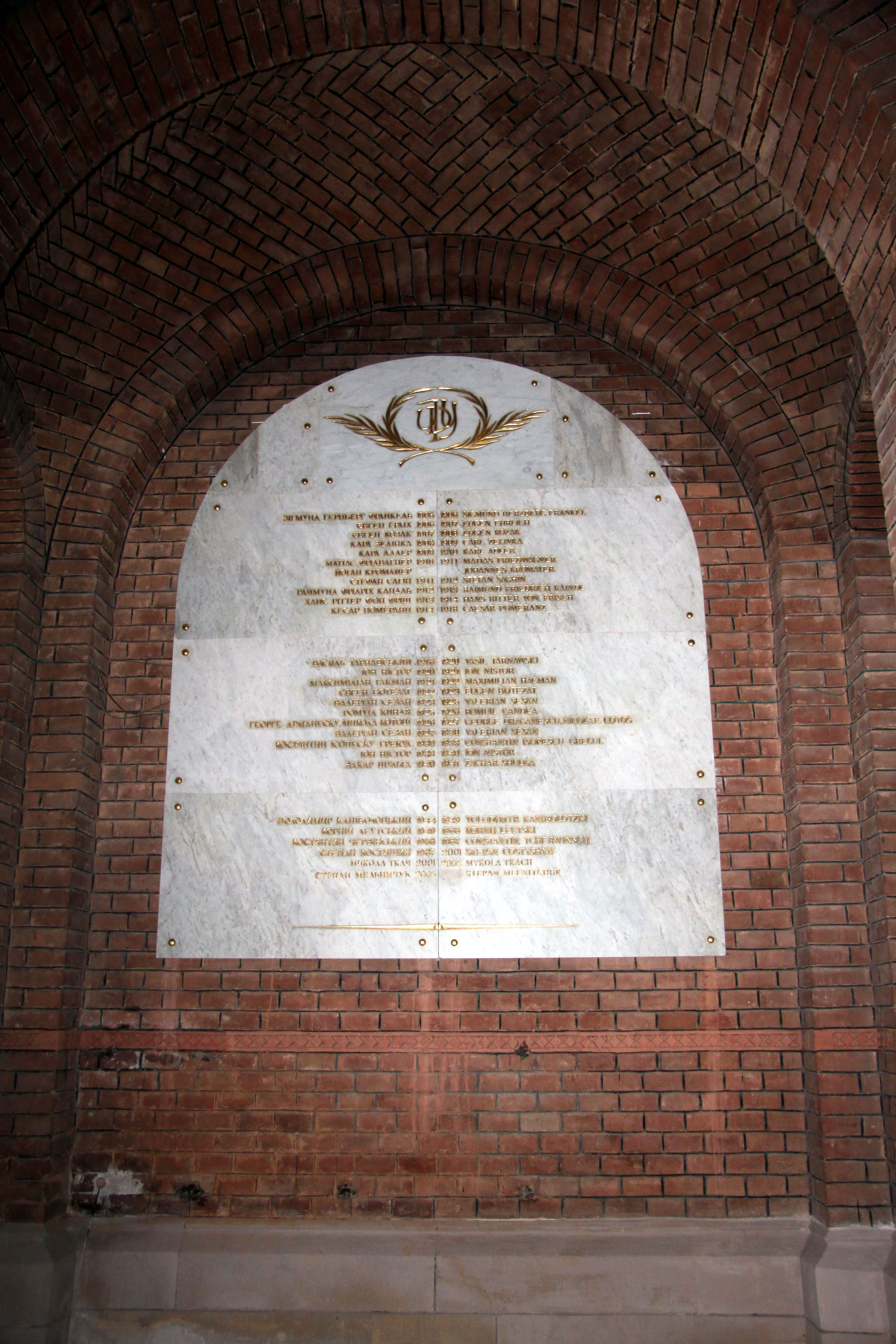
Plaque dedicated to the rectors of the University of Chernivtsi, also mentioning Constantin Isopescu-Grecul

From late 1930 to 1933, Isopescu-Grecul was rector of Cernăuți University, and, from May 1931, obtained the university's assigned seat in the Senate of Romania. Under his management, King Carol II received an honorary degree, thereafter lending his name to the university itself. Once the institution was hit by the Great Depression, Isopescu-Grecul formally demanded financial assistance for "Bukovina's brain and heart" from the government, led at the time by Iorga. In late May 1933, the institution also witnessed a round of clashes between Christian and Jewish students. Just before the buildings had been evacutaed and occupied by the Romanian Army as peacekeepers, the law faculty asked him to intervene for the conditional release of Christians arrested as agitators; he instead "issued parental demands that the students settle down and refrain from causing any additional regrettable incidents". On June 3, he presided upon a meeting of the university senate, which was also attended by a Siguranța inspector. It upheld sanctions against "student agitators", enforced a curfew, and reviewed a warrant to arrest "student Petricariu, identified as the author of a manifesto against the university senate". On June 7, Isopescu-Grecul sough to make sure that Jewish students could take their examinations, segregating them from their Christian colleagues (who had by then gone on strike).

On June 22, 1933, the king created Isopescu-Grecul a Grand Cross of the Order of the Star of Romania. Upon completing his stint as rector, he withdrew into academic work and contributed essays on legal topics, most of which only remained known to the community of specialists. The Romanian administration of Czernowitz/Cernăuți named a street in his honor, which proved to be the topic of controversy. The Review Committee vetoed the matter, noting that the rector was still alive, and therefore that his contemporaries were not able to assess his merits "in full competence". He tried to preserve his university-assigned seat in the national Senate during the legislative election of December 1933, but lost to theologian Vasile Loichiță, 24 votes to 18.

In his late years, Isopescu-Grecul was also involved in intrigues between the Rusyn and Ukrainian communities, supporting Kassian Bogatyrets and Jevhen Kozak as the authorized representatives of the former. In April 1935, rumors circulated that he had left the PNȚ and joined the far-right Romanian Front; he denied that claim and rejected the Front's economic antisemitism, insisting that he considered Jews to be patriotic, and that their status as Romanian citizens was "crucial to me". He also described himself as "a simple soldier, not even an orderly of the National Peasants' Party, and therefore accustomed to discipline." Appearing at a political rally on September 10, he endorsed the PNȚ program of transforming Romania into a "peasant state", describing the need to harness productive capital against a "coterie that has taken hold of the country." Another such rally was held in November 1936, with Isopescu-Grecul appearing at the rostrum in Alecsandri Square alongside members of the PNȚ elite—Ion Mihalache, Virgil Madgearu, and Pan Halippa. The event doubled as a rally against Hungarian irredentism; according to Curentul newspaper, it was used by Ukrainian Peasantists as an opportunity to demand regional autonomy for Bukovina. At the time, Isopescu-Grecul's idea of unifying Romania and Hungary was again being championed by the likes of István Bethlen and Hermann Müller, who proposed it to Carol II; on the Romanian side, the negotiations reportedly involved Dimitrie Ghyka.

One of Isopescu-Grecul's final assignments was as a delegate of the Romanian academic body in the Kingdom of Italy. In February 1938, Carol formally outlawed all political parties, including the PNȚ, and introduced his own corporative constitution. Isopescu-Grecul saluted this move in a latter to Maniu, declaring that he had long resented the PNȚ's ideology, and that he was resigning the party. He died shortly after in his native city. On April 1, he was buried at a local cemetery, after a ceremony held at the university chapel. The service was provided by 12 Orthodox priests, including Visarion Puiu; rector Ion Nistor delivered a funeral oration, as did Diti Tarangul, on behalf of Isopescu-Grecul's students. In an obituary piece that was published in April, Iorga recognized Isopescu-Grecul as a "good Romanian" and a "stolidly impartial" legislator, an exponent of "correct Austrian bureaucratism". In contrast, Constantin Argetoianu, Iorga's one-time partner in government, dismissed Isopescu-Grecul in his memoirs, calling him "a disagreeable con artist". According to the left-wing lawyer Otto Roth, by 1939 the project for a personal union between Hungary and Romania was again being promoted by Budapest dissidents, being seen as a possible bulwark against encroachment by Nazi Germany.
