= Democratic Peasants' Party (Bukovina) =

Political party in Austria-Hungary

Democratic Peasants' Party Partidul Țărănesc Democrat Demokratische Bauernpartei
- President: Aurel Onciul (to 1918); Florea Lupu (1918–1919)
- Founded: 1902
- Dissolved: 1919
- Merged into: National Romanian Party (1905–1908); Christian Social (National) Party (1908–1911); Democratic Union Party (1919)
- Headquarters: Czernowitz, Duchy of Bukovina, Austria-Hungary
- Newspaper: Privitorul (1902); Voința Poporului (1902); Foaia Poporului (1911)
- Cultural wing: Dacia Society
- Paramilitary wing: Arcași
- Ideology: Economic nationalism (Romanian, Austrian); Left-wing populism National liberalism Agrarianism; Economic antisemitism Anticlericalism; United States of Greater Austria
- Political position: Left-wing
- National affiliation: Freisinnige Verband (1903–1904); Progressive Peasants' Fellowship (1904–1905); Romanian Club (1914–1918)
- Colours: White; Black, Yellow (Habsburg flag)
- Slogan: Înainte, nimănui spre daună, tuturor spre bine ("Forward, with bad outcomes for none and good outcomes for all"); A.E.I.O.U.

The Democratic Peasants' Party (Romanian: Partidul Țărănesc Democrat, PȚD; German: Demokratische Bauernpartei; Ukrainian: Демократична селянська партія, Demokratychna selyans'ka partiya), also known as Democratic Party, Peasants' Party, National Democratic Party or Unirea Society, was a provincial party in Bukovina, Austria-Hungary, one of several groups claiming to represent the ethnic Romanians. It had a national liberal and left-wing populist agenda, and was mainly supported by "the peasants, the village teachers, and some of the intellectuals." Its leader was Aurel Onciul, seconded by Florea Lupu, both of whom were adversaries of the conservative and elitist Romanian National People's Party (PNPR). Rejecting sectarianism, the PȚD combined Austrian and Romanian nationalism, as Onciul argued that Romanian aspirations could only be fulfilled inside the multi-ethnic empire. For this reason, and for its role in dividing the Romanian vote, the party was often accused of double-dealing.

In 1902–1905, the PȚD pursued an alliance policy with politicians from the other ethnic groups—including, most controversially, Ukrainian nationalists. This resulted in the creation of a Progressive Peasants' Fellowship, which dominated the Diet of Bukovina and, in 1904, passed an electoral reform project drafted by Benno Straucher. Ethnic rivalries pushed the group back into sectarian politics before the legislative elections of 1907. The PȚD embraced economic antisemitism and, together with the PNPR, merged into Christian Social Romanian Party in 1908. It continued to have an autonomous existence, with its elite controlling Bukovina's state bank and Raiffeisen credit union. Its business practices nearly drove Bukovina's economy into insolvency, turning other Romanians against Onciul.

The PȚD reemerged informally during the election of July 1911, and again formally in April 1914. At that stage, it embraced agrarianism and anticlericalism, while also reaffirming its loyalty to Austria and its opposition to the Kingdom of Romania. It became dormant a few months later, with the outbreak of World War I and the Russian offensive, during which party activists put up an inefficient paramilitary resistance.

Onciul continued to represent the PȚD in the Austrian House of Deputies to 1918, singular among his Romanian colleagues for endorsing a Romanian–Ukrainian partition of Bukovina. His cooperation with the Ukrainian Galician Army resulted in his and his party's disgrace, but the backlash contributed to Bukovina's incorporation with Greater Romania. Lupu assumed leadership of the PȚD in its final avatar, which ultimately merged with the Democratic Union Party in 1919. Its Arcași paramilitaries, reformed as a set of independent clubs, and later as an official organization of the Romanian state, were in near-continuous existence until 1944.

== History ==
=== Foundations ===
The PȚD existed during the final stages of Austrian Bukovina, when the "extreme ethnic fragmentation" created various rivalries or alliances between its main ethnic groups: the large and rural communities of Romanians and Ukrainians (or "Ruthenians"), and the mostly urban German and Jewish minorities. From his early years, Onciul was separated from the mainline currents of Romanian nationalism in Bukovina, represented at first by the local Concordia Society (or "National Romanian Party"). Although he did preserve contacts with its conservative wing, he was more interested in the rival PNPR (or "Radical Nationalist Party"). However, as historian Vlad Gafița notes, his attempt to participate in the latter was hampered by his professional work: for a while, he worked as a bank clerk in Moravia. Onciul had antagonized other Romanians by taking sides with the Austrian officials, in turn accused of playing community leaders against each other, or of "Machiavellianism".

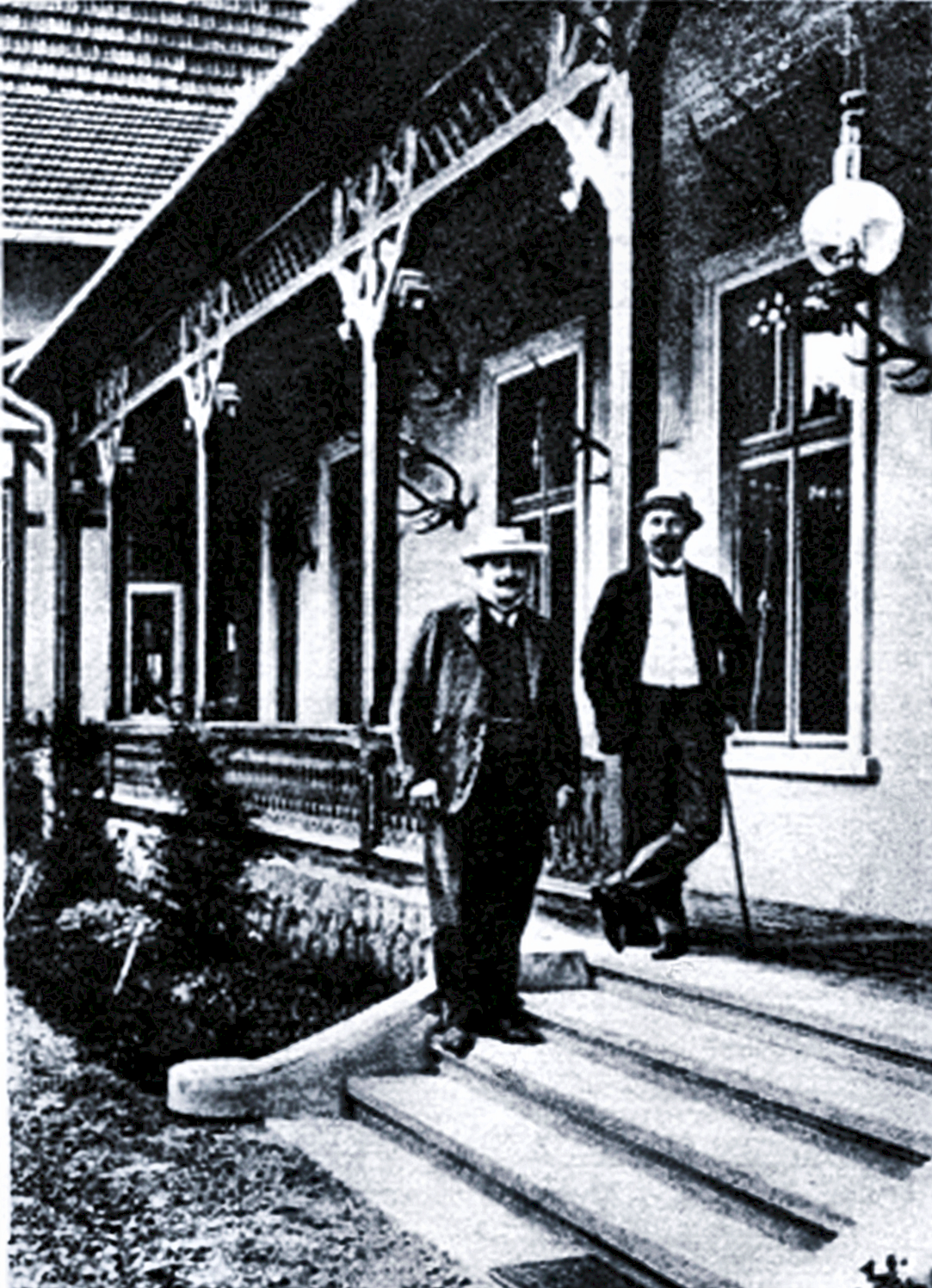
Konrad zu Hohenlohe (on the right) and the Captain of Bukovina, Georg Graf Wassilko von Serecki, at Berhometh in 1904

According to scholar Irina Livezeanu, the "relative liberalism" of the Austrian administration promoted an "accommodationist" climate, in which the elites were less tempted to group on competitive national bases—Onciul illustrated such a spirit. Historian Teodor Bălan believes that Onciul's ascendancy was directly owed to the new Governor of Bukovina, Konrad zu Hohenlohe, who wished to calm the situation after a season of Romanian–Ukrainian political battles. For this, he needed "a political program with economic demands, which would exclude the national question" and "replace political romanticism with realism." Onciul validated these priorities by turning to a moderate nationalism which favored an "entente with the Ruthenians, national autonomy, cultivation of the vernacular, and a more intimate relationship with Romanians abroad."

Onciul first took a seat in the Austrian House of Deputies during the January 1901 election, which he contested at Czernowitz. By October, he was publicizing his critique of the PNPR, accusing it of passivity. According to Onciul, the "old men" of Bukovina's politics endorsed a radical program on paper, knowing full well that they would never apply it. Identifying with the "youth", the PȚD was formally established in early 1902, but took almost a year to emerge as an organized group: in January 1903, it published its "Democratic Program", and on February 2, held its first congress, as "the Political Society Unirea or Democratic Peasants' Party". Onciul was its president, seconded by Grigore Halip and George Hostiuc; Unirea's first motto was Înainte, nimănui spre daună, tuturor spre bine ("Forward, with bad outcomes for none and good outcomes for all").

Onciul, who was the party president, made his entry into politics at an inauspicious time, when the Concordia Conservatives and the PNPR had agreed to merge back into a single party, headed by Iancu Flondor. This challenge guided the PȚD unorthodox strategy, including its alliances and its attacks on other Romanian leaders. The latter were carried in the two party newspapers, Privitorul ("The Onlooker") and Voința Poporului ("The People's Will"), both of which had been founded in 1902. Onciul's brother in law, the Conservative Florea Lupu, came out in support of these attacks. Together with his refusal to accept the PNPR merger, this stance caused him to be expelled from Concordia—although he held on to his seat in the House.

=== Positioning ===
Map of the United States of Greater Austria, as proposed by Aurel Popovici, superimposed over the majority ethnic groups. The Romanians (in orange) are largely grouped into "Transylvania", which has absorbed Bukovina to the north-east

In its propaganda, the PȚD accused the "boyar" elite of having exploited the peasant class and the rural intelligentsia, claiming to expose elitist nationalism as a scheme; it advocated its populist nationalism of a distinctly left-wing stance. Privitorul deplored "boyar" elitism, and exposed the non-Romanian origins of various families forming the conservative ruling class. According to Gafița, Onciul and his followers saw themselves as emancipated progressives: "profoundly loyal" to the House of Habsburg-Lorraine, capable of seeing beyond national divisions, and even open to the idea of a trans-ethnic, Austrian nationalism. Gafița also sees Onciul as employing "doublespeak" on this issue, and of willingly fashioning himself to be the diametrical opposite of Flondor.

Historian Ioan Cocuz, one of Onciul's staunchest critics, describes him as "wholly unscrupulous", as well as "anti-national", "a loyal Austrian". However, researcher Mihai Iacobescu writes that the PȚD agenda may have been "hesitant, contradictory, dissolving", but not truly "anti-national". Onciul firmly believed that Austria had united the small peoples of East-Central Europe, and that this had protected them from being absorbed into the Russian Empire. While preserving imperial rule, he favored a multicultural approach, with each people granted "independent organization and management", especially over language education. The process leading to additional federalism was a form of suum cuique, with the Moravian Diet as a working model of ethnic cohabitation. His ideas on the topic were overall similar with the "United States of Greater Austria" designs of Aurel Popovici, as acknowledged by Popovici himself. Onciul also extended this federal model to solve the national issue of Romanians being divided over several states: a scheme proposed by Privitorul around 1902 was to somehow incorporate the Kingdom of Romania into Austria.

As Livezeanu observes: "Aurel Onciul's National Democratic Party [...] brought together liberal Romanians who favored ethnic compromise and opposed the social conservatism of the National Party." According to Nicolae Iorga, the historian and nationalist polemicist, Onciul became especially adept at manipulating the schoolteachers and peasants against the aristocrats. Cocuz similarly suggests that Onciul and Lupu relied on an "incitement" tactic: "setting the class of Romanian schoolteachers against the national Romanian parties". A major point of contention was class representation within the Diet of Bukovina, with Onciul noting that 150 "boyars" elected 10 parliamentarians, while 18,000 peasants and 70,000 proletarians elected one deputy each. The party's original manifesto argued:

For ten years now, we have repeatedly tried to reason with our boyars into giving the people its fair share of public life, but all our attempts have been in vain. The boyars never ceased confiscating the people's electoral right, and to abuse it in order to grow rich and occupy for themselves offices on the people's money and for the people's perdition. Given this, we have no other road left but the fight against boyars in order to gain our electoral liberty and with it the people's legitimate influence over its own destiny. [Unirea Society is] a point of convergence for honest, national and democratic, Romanian politics.

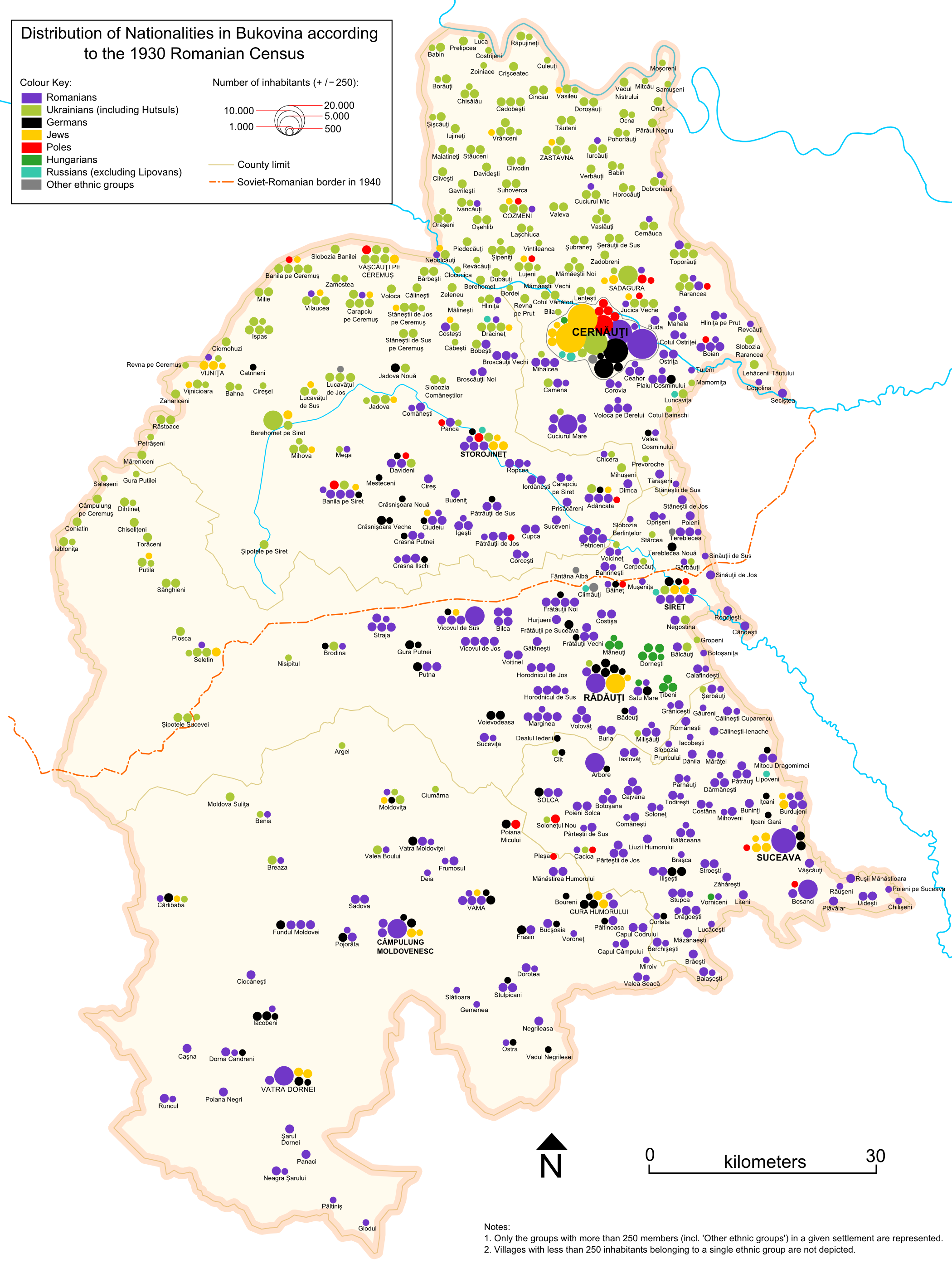
Ethnic map of Bukovina in 1930: Ukrainians in pale green, Romanians in purple, Jews in yellow and Germans in black

The effect of this discourse is assessed by Gafița as follows: "The democrats' orientation toward predominantly social demands, as opposed to those of a national-political substance reaped momentary electoral gains, but also numerous losses for the Romanian emancipation movement as a whole. The latter was submerged and weakened by a climate of internal conflict, but also by the spread of left-wing concepts, such as the class conflict of peasants and boyars, inside the Romanian camp." Scholar Andrei Corbea-Hoișie also notes that Onciul's platform "was not based on the strict national doctrine of the established [National Party], but on [the] goals of left-liberal social and political progress". Rather than representing the peasantry, the group was vying "for the favor of the Romanian middle class".

=== Freisinnige Verband ===
Onciul and Lupu were elected to the regional Diet in the by-elections of June 1903, allegedly with a mixture of Romanian and Ukrainian votes. Also in 1903, the PȚD leader established in Vienna a trans-ethnic League for Electoral Reform, which became in June 1904 the Liberal Alliance or Freisinnige Verband ("Freethinkers' Alliance"). Its other leaders were: Staucher, the German Arthur Skedl, the Romanian Ukrainophile Nikolai von Wassilko, and the "Young Ukrainian" Stepan Smal-Stotskyi. This act remains one of enduring controversy among Romanians: Cocuz argues that Smal-Stotskyi intended to use the Verband as an advancement tool for the Ukrainians. According to Smal-Stotskyi, his group was a "subjugated nation", which could succeed "only within the titular nations." Cocuz speculates that this policy was suggested to Onciul by Hohenlohe, in a bid do undermine the PNPR.

During June 1903, Onciul publicly announced that electoral reform was his chief political goal, and that upon its adoption he would retire to Moravia. Beginning in autumn, he approached Flondor and the Conservatives to discuss Bukovina's democratization, following blueprints drafted by Benno Straucher, the Jewish politician. Both also negotiated with Hohenlohe and with the Austrian Minister-President, Ernest von Koerber. The agreement between the groups also included their future merger into a "Unitary Romanian Party", its ideological stance to be decided by grassroots democracy. However, the electoral reform project had lost Flondor's support, which also caused the merger project to unravel. It remains poorly understood why Flondor opted to back out: he may have reactivated his Concordia nationalism, as the electoral reform unwittingly gave electoral leverage to the urbanized German and Jews. Moreover, Cocuz claims that the merger deal was suspicious, and that the PNPR never truly accepted it as such. He also believes that Onciul was being hypocritical, offering the merger but still caucusing with the Ukrainians, "the Romanians' most bitter ethnic enemies", and refusing to tone down his attacks on Flondor.

The perceived anti-reform attitude of Flondor and the PNPR pushed the PȚD into a near-complete isolation. On November 10, Onciul, Straucher, Smal-Stotskyi, Wassilko, Hierotheus Pihuliak and Theodor Lewicki signed a manifesto condemning the Romanian parties in exceptionally harsh terms, accusing them of having stalled democratic progress. Such moves upset the moderate Hostiuc, who resigned from the PȚD for fear of becoming a "tool to our enemies". The PȚD intensified its outreach efforts toward the Ukrainian, German and Jewish politicians, coordinating attacks on Flondor—during what became known as the "Flondor Affair", anti-PNPR forces in the Diet accused Flondor of spreading antisemitism, and forced his resignation. In the Diet, Onciul also accused Flondor of secretly sabotaging his electoral campaign; he was in turn accused by his adversary of being an "international agent". Trying to forge a lasting alliance with Smal-Stotskyi, he also challenged in Privitorul the core theses of Concordia nationalists. He suggested that German colonization in Bukovina could only benefit the local Romanians, and help them learn new trades. From the Diet rostrum, Lupu also praised the Germanic talent for administration, seemingly with his brother-in-law's acquiescence.

Onciul became especially controversial in Romanian circles when he first claimed that all Bukovinians were East Slavs, some of whom had been Romanianized. Onciul's other essays denied the existence of Ukrainization in northern Bukovina, claiming that the Cheremosh Valley had always been a Ukrainian heartland; this stance was immediately challenged from within the party by Zaharia Voronca. In 1901, Lupu had been expelled by the leading nationalist club, Societatea Academică Junimea, after ridiculing the Romanian tricolor; Onciul himself resigned from Junimea in December 1902. Condemned as "anti-Romanian", Onciul and Lupu also found themselves expelled from the cultural society România Jună in 1904. During the polemic that followed, PȚD men dismissed România Jună as an instrument of "the boyars" and a "herd of bovines". A pro-Onciul wing of the club broke off as Dacia Society, which counted Filaret Doboș and George Tofan among its leading members.

=== Progressive Peasants' Fellowship and Arcași ===
Diet seats following the elections of 1904. Progressive Peasants' Fellowship Armenian Independent (Varteres von Prunkul, renounced seat to majority) Jewish Socialist (Wiedenfield, sides with majority) Opposition Conservatives (Romanian) Opposition Conservatives (Armenian and Polish) Chamber of Commerce

During the political realignment that followed Flondor's resignation, Ociul was able to succeed with his policy of alliances outside his ethnic group, creating a tighter version of the 1903 League. This "Progressive Peasants' Fellowship", presided over by Onciul, together with Skedl, Smal-Stotskyi and Georg Graf Wassilko von Serecki, took the majority vote (17 out of 31 seats) in 1904 elections for the Diet; the PNPR had dissolved itself, and a Conservative (or "Pactist") Party, under Ioan Volcinschi, took 4 seats. Onciul, Graf Wassilko and Lupu all won seats in this arrangement, as did their PȚD colleagues Teofil Simionovici and Alexandru Buburuzan; a sixth was won when the front-runner Varteres von Prunkul, an Armenian, renounced in favor of the PȚD man Tit Onciul. An inner-Fellowship agreement prevented the PȚD from putting up candidates in the six majority-Ukrainian constituencies, and in turn guaranteed Ukrainian votes in the majority-Romanian ones.

As a result of this reshuffling, Graf Wassilko became Landeshauptmann, with Smal-Stotskyi as his lieutenant. Their arrival to power brought with it the adoption of Straucher's democratic reform. There followed liberal and nationalist bills (including the establishment of a state bank, the lifting of propination laws, and the creation of a Romanian History Chair at Francis Joseph University), but the more radical measures proposed by the PȚD were vetoed by Koerber. Soon after, the Fellowship began rupturing around ethnic lines. This had been a backup option for Onciul, who had vetoed Graf Wassilko's proposal to fuse the distinct Fellowship clubs into unitary, non-ethnic, sections.

For a while in 1905, the PȚD press had no real challenge in Bukovina's cultural-political setting. As the PNPR reconstituted itself around Dorimedont Popovici and the paper Apărarea Națională, Onciul himself began pressing for Flondor's return to politics, and for a reunification of Romanian nationalists. The party exposed anti-Romanian sentiments expressed by the other Fellowship partners (in particular by Smal-Stotskyi) and Ukrainian attempts to control the regional bank, and won instead support from various German deputies. Onciul became expressly committed to economic nationalism and nativism, and more critical of Austria's internal colonization policies. Privitorul claimed that: "Mass auctioning of both peasant granges and large-scale properties has steadily brought down the number of our settled population. It is being replaced by legions of foreigners who share neither our custom nor our language, and the pitiful Romanian people, sucked to its marrow by the tolerated usurers, is driven to all corners of the Earth by the indifference of present-day potentates."

This interval in power also saw the creation of Romanian paramilitary and self-help units, called the Arcași ("Bowmen"). The groups were consciously modeled as a mixture of volunteer fire departments and Sokol clubs. They were identified by their white shirts, but also wore ribbons echoing the Romanian tricolor. The first such units, also active within the temperance movement, were set up in Alt Fratautz and Parhautz. Their creation signaled the Onciul and Lupu wanted to expand beyond their bourgeois constituency and actively involve the Romanian peasantry in regional politics. They were often involved in skirmishes with the Ukrainian Sich clubs, "reaching out for their knives and revolvers."

On May 28, 1905, the Fellowship was denounced by the PȚD, and ceased to exist. During that interval, Onciul had a bitter polemic with Wassilko and Straucher's newspaper, Bukowinaer Post. On July 17, the PȚD merged into Modest Grigorcea's reconstructed National Romanian Party (PNR), but continued to function informally as a Democratic wing, still putting out Voința Poporului to October 1908. In 1906, the PȚD proudly accepted the label of a Romanian "irredentist" group, allowing its Arcași delegates to attend the 25th anniversary of the Romanian Kingdom. Although an old rival of Onciul's, Nicolae Iorga joined Dacia Society as an honorary member. He was then persuaded by Tofan to mediate between Onciul and Flondor, trying to reunite them around a nativist slogan, "Bukovina for the Romanians". Running on PNR lists for the by-elections of Chernowitz—Sereth—Storozynetz, Onciul easily won a seat in the Austrian House of Deputies, and was reelected at Gura Humora in the full-term elections of 1907. Together with Dacia, the Arcași were important electoral agents for Onciul.

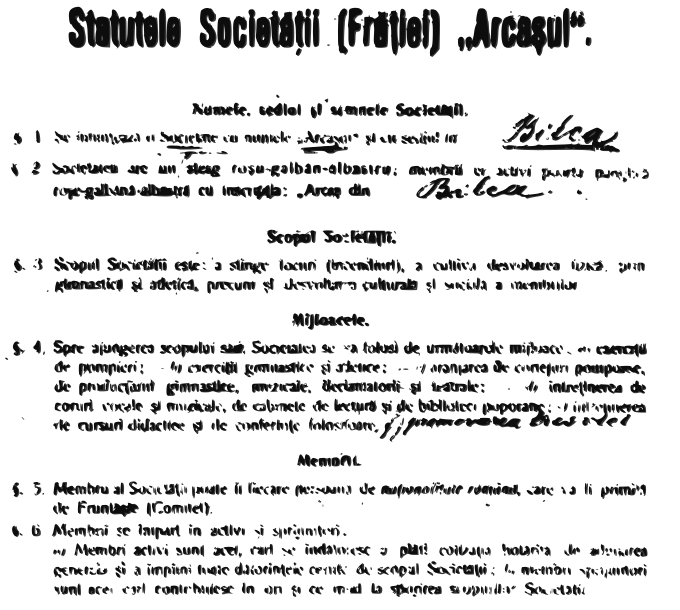
1909 statute of the Arcași in Bilca, outlining their role in firefighting, physical education, and civil culture, as well as their participation in the temperance movement (tesvie)

At the time, the faction drew its funds from corrupt practices, taking over control of the local Raiffeisen credit union, which Lupu, as president of the public bank, used for high-risk investments in the forestry business. Tensions were again running high between the Romanians and the Ukrainians, with the latter openly calling for Bukovina to be merged into Galicia-Lodomeria as a single "Ruthenian province". Reversing the Ukrainian political ascendancy, Onciul and other PȚD figures undermined Smal-Stotskyi's constituency by joining hands with the mainly Orthodox Ukrainian Russophiles against the Greek-Catholics. However, former associate N. Wassilko sponsored Lupu with money for the regional bank, receiving instead guarantees that opponents of Wassilko's would not find themselves in eligible positions. A new Governor, Rudolf Graf von Meran, observed the Onciul–Lupu partnership and began issuing calls and warnings toward Bukovina's "healing".

=== Antisemitism and PCSR ===
In parallel, Onciul began advocating electoral reform in Cisleithania, supporting the over-representation of Germans, Italians and Romanians as a counterweight to the Slavic vote. However, the PȚD slid into hostility toward the local Jews. Voința Poporului openly embraced economic antisemitism during the peasants' revolt in neighboring Romania, indirectly criticizing the Jewish middle class in Bukovina. Other newspapers, secretly ran by Onciul, published more direct attacks on rich Jews. Such venues include Die Wahrheit, edited by Mihail Chisanovici, and Bukowinaer Lloyd, whose publisher was a Jewish man, Emanuel Goldenberg.

In October 1908, the PNR, including its Democratic wing, merged with the Apărarea Națională group to form the Christian Social Romanian Party of Bukovina (PCSR). It offered its presidency to Flondor, who (despite having qualms about the inclusion of a PȚD group) accepted. Although claiming to represent, above all, the local interest of the Romanians, the new party also functioned as a Bukovinian simile of Austria's Christian Social Party (CS), fully adopting its antisemitic theses.

As noted by Corbea-Hoișie, Onciul initially denied the connection, stating that he and the CS had no common ideological ground; however, Onciul ended up with a "decisive role" in the "brutal enforcement of antisemitic commonplaces and slogans in public discourse." In particular, Onciul expanded his polemic with Straucher and other local Jews to an imperial scale, arguing that "vampire" Jews had taken hold of the Austro-Hungarian press, and would eventually subjugate the economy. He also alleged that a conspiracy of German and Jewish interests had blocked out his project to tax the alcohol industry and redirect funding toward public education. Radicalized by his readings from Karl Lueger, by 1909 Onciul was writing that Christianity and Judaism were incompatible, and that Jews were anarchic "bloodsuckers" or "well-poisoners". He proposed racial segregation, euphemistically defined as "Christian self-determination". Onciul extended some of his nativist criticism to include the Bukovina Poles, engaging in public debates with another deputy, Krzysztof Abrahamowicz.

Onciul also worked intensely to unify the various Romanian groups under the antisemitic banner, and also publicly denounced liberalism in all its forms, insisting that the PȚD had always stood for the "thoroughly conservative peasantry". On January 31, 1909, after co-opting various other factions, the PCSR became a "Romanian National Party", with Flondor reconfirmed as leader—essentially a reunion of Concordia. Also then, as a result of Onciul's networking, the party became formally allied with the Austrian CS, though still as an "independent corporation". Despite being one of the two vice presidents, Onciul continued to antagonize his colleagues, preserved the Democratic wing as an informal party division, and was suspected of conspiring against Flondor.

During the congress of November 1910, Flondor announced his resignation; Onciul was reconfirmed as vice president, delivering a speech about the coming victory of the Romanian element over the Ruthenians. He noted that there was little reason to worry, since, despite official census data, Romanians had a sizable majority. The party was able to coalesce again in April 1911, when its candidates, including Onciul, Lupu and Simionovici, won seats against a rising left-wing threat, the Social Democratic Party of Bukovina—this was celebrated in the party press as a victory of "nationality and law" against "international socialism".

Leaders of the PȚD and of the PCSR Peasant faction
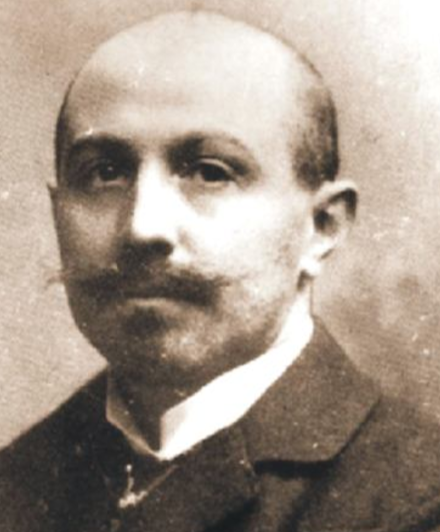
Aurel Onciul

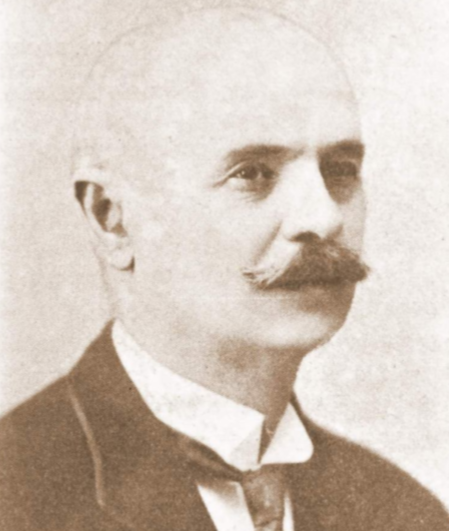
Florea Lupu

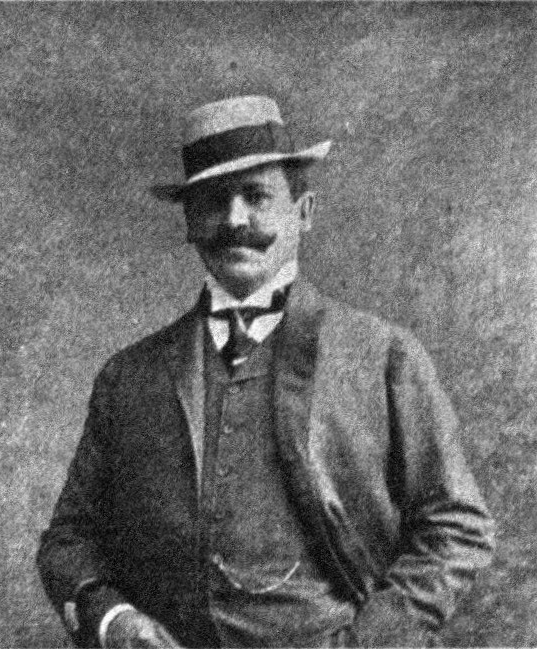
Teofil Simionovici

After this victory, Onciul was able to reform the electoral law, tightening the concept of ethnic representation, splitting voters into ethnic caucuses (curiae), and eliminating indirect suffrage. He tried to obtain a corporate caucus for Jews, noting that this would fit in with their status as a "foreign body". The central government of Austria-Hungary, headed by Count Bienerth-Schmerling, vetoed this plan, and forced Bukovina to maintain common representation for the Jews and Germans.

On June 20, 1911, the PCSR/PNR effectively split, following a publicized row between Onciul and Popovici. Days later, Onciul, as the "former leader of the national Romanian party", proposed forming a "Romanian Club" in the Diet, as a venue for cooperation between right- and left-wing Romanians. He noted that his other alternative was to restore the Freisinnige Verband "with the country's other, foreign populations." During the House election of July 1911, Lupu was defeated at Bojan by Constantin Isopescu-Grecul, who claimed that the Raiffeisen scheme had been intended to destroy the Bukovinian Romanian banks. Onciul's supporters also failed in the district of Radautz, where Tofan was narrowly defeated by Apărarea's Aurel Țurcan.

The relaunched Democrats (also "Democratic Peasantists", or "National Peasantists"), putting out a newspaper Foaia Poporului ("People's Sheet"), resumed their attacks on the Concordia establishment, this time claiming to represent the true voice of Romanian nationalism in a populist and anticlerical variant. Other attacks focused on pan-Romanian nationalists based in the Kingdom of Romania—in particular the Cultural League. Although Chisanovici joined Isopescu-Grecul on a goodwill tour of the Kingdom, he and Onciul were denounced as Austrian agents, and measures were taken to cut down Romanian subsidies for Foaia Poporului. Depicting the rump PNR as party "of parsons and kikes" acting "on government orders", Foaia Poporului was in turn attacked as a "sellout to Jewish finance".

Although, by 1911, Onciul had toned down his and his party's antisemitism, he still believed that the Jews were obstacles to his federalist project, in that they often supported centralization. At this stage, Onciul was again open to collaboration with the Ukrainians, by proposing that the contested Orthodox Bishopric of Bukovina be informally split between the Romanian and Ukrainian churchgoers. The Romanian conservative establishment complained about the Ukrainization of churches, but Onciul disagreed. Like many in the Ukrainian press, he suggested that there was a "denationalization of the Ruthenians by Romanians". He also hoped that, through promises of debt restructuring for Ukrainian credit unions, who would obtain the establishment of a regional credit cooperative, to be presided upon by him.

=== World War I disputes ===
The Raiffeisen fiasco prompted Onciul to consider restoring his old party. The PȚD reemerged formally at Czernowitz on April 26, 1914, under the name of "Peasants' Party", and with Onciul reconfirmed as president. Its other leading members included Lupu, Buburuzan, Doboș, and Chisanovici. Onciul and Simionovici held the party's two of the five Romanian seats in the House, which were collectively grouped as a "Romanian Club" caucus; the three other seats were held by Isopescu-Grecul and Gheorghe Sârbu of the PNR, and by Alexandru Hurmuzachi, an independent. The group's generic populism was replaced with agrarianism: it claimed to have divorced from the intelligentsia, and to be focused on "ensuring that the peasants are happy"—according to Cocuz, this reinvention was "ridiculous" and "farcical".

The party also restated its loyalism, declaring itself hostile to projects of union between Bukovina and Romania. Onciul had a publicized row with Ion Grămadă and other young Romanian nationalists, whom he denounced as "irredentists". By April, his renewed attacks on the Cultural League and its "chauvinism" created a stir in Romanian nationalist circles. These responded by calling Onciul a "traitor" and "alcoholic". During a Diet session on June 14, Onciul clashed with the nationalist deputy Țurcan, hitting him with a clot of blotting paper. As Onciul put it at the time:

the squires' gazettes and the priests have this practice of wailing and grumbling against the Empire and of abasing [the Empire] in Romania's eyes. This wailing, grumbling and abasing had found a strong echo in Romania, ruining the friendship between that country and Our Empire, that which is harmful to both countries. Our hearts aching, we stood up to this cavalcade, and we asked those in the Kingdom to mind their own business and leave us to our own fate, and to stop meddling in our affairs.

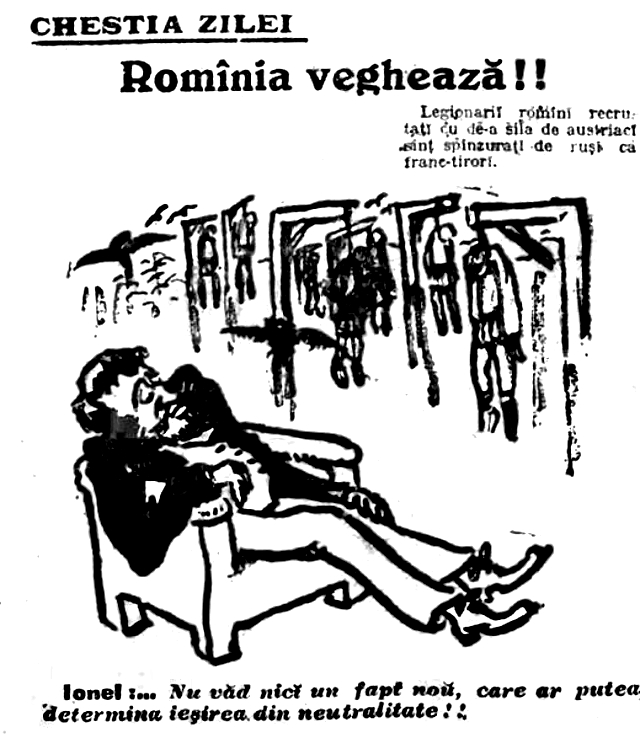
Cartoon in Adevărul, January 1915, mocking Romania's neutrality during the massacres of Bukovina's "legionaries"

The Sarajevo Assassination of June 28 took Austria-Hungary into World War I, and meant the effective end of the party, which had had no meaningful activity after establishing itself. Nominally, however, the Peasantist group continued to be represented in the House until late 1918, through Onciul and Simionovici. From the early stages of war, Onciul was more radical than the Concordia elites in supporting the Austrian cause, adopting the imperial slogan A.E.I.O.U.. This issue took the forefront in July 1914, at the Schoolteachers' Congress in Suczawa. Onciul and Chisanovici tried to prevent it from taking place, claiming that it would be used for promoting irredentism. Onciul then openly accused a guest speaker, Onisifor Ghibu, of "high treason" against Austria.

As reported by scholar Iuliu Maior, the teachers' congress showed Onciul's desperation that the PȚD was losing political relevancy. Around that time, some former leading members of the party were indeed growing reluctant of endorsing the Austrian project—Tit Onciul was arrested as a traitor by the Gendarmerie, and reputedly mistreated. During the Russian invasion of November, Aurel Onciul and Buburuzan formed defense units of "legionaries" among the Romanians, comprising up to 1,500 irregulars; N. Wassilko did the same among the Hutsuls. These largely peasant troops were notoriously untrained and under-equipped, wearing civilian clothes and black-yellow armbands, and were consequently decimated by the enemy.

For the following year, with Romania still neutral, Onciul supported schemes that would prevent her joining the war against Austria and the other Central Powers. Together with the Bessarabian Constantin Stere, he sought to obtain more collective rights for Romanians in Transleithania, and thus prevent Romania from having a casus belli; he believed that the best scenario was for Romania to fight alongside Austria, and receive Bessarabia as a reward, or even to be peacefully annexed by the empire. The latter proposal vexed Iorga, who replied that "Romania as a state is no Belgium, to exist [only] as a customs office", but the representation of a "healthy people, with its future ahead." Also then, Onciul mediated between the Romanians of Transylvania and the Prime Minister of Hungary, István Tisza, asking Tisza to curb Magyarization policies, reform the electoral law, and give semiofficial status to the Romanian language.

When Romania declared war on the Central Powers, what remained of the PȚD was further split. Doboș deserted to the Romanian side, then helped organized Romanian political clubs and a Volunteer Corps in the Ukrainian People's Republic. He himself noted that "many" of his colleagues in Dacia Society followed suit. In November 1917, Doboș joined Sever Bocu and Tomáš Garrigue Masaryk at the Congress of Nationalities from Austria-Hungary, held in Kiev. As Romania experienced heavy losses and its capital fell, Onciul radicalized his opinions on the issue of irredentism. He argued for the annexation of Romania to fulfill Romanian unity under one crown; he also called for Austria to cede its Ukrainian regions to a Ukrainian state, and for West Galicia to fuse into a German-aligned Poland.

=== Termination and survivals ===
Throughout most of 1918, still a representative of Bukovina in the House, Onciul supported plans for the region's partition on an ethnic basis. On October 4, present at Czernowitz, he and Lupu were elected to the 50-member National Romanian Council, which rejected partition and also proposed merging the whole of Bukovina with Transylvania, to form an independent Romanian state. Alone among the Romanian intellectuals, Onciul refused to abide by this agenda, and, according to his adversaries, did everything in his power to obstruct their work. During negotiations, he threatened the anti-Austrian Sextil Pușcariu, hinting that Pușcariu risked a death sentence for his disloyalty. Onciul refused to recognize the National Council as a constitutional body, and instigated other Romanian Club members to do the same. This effort collapsed: parliamentarians Sârbu and George Grigorovici refused to follow Onciul's lead, and returned to Czernowitz.

Foaia Poporului, published as a newspaper of the "National Peasants' Party", continued to press for the loyalist agenda during October, although the empire slowly disintegrated (see Republic of German-Austria). On November 6, as a self-appointed representative of the Romanians, Onciul agreed to divide Bukovina with the West Ukrainian People's Republic, which was represented locally by Omelian Popovych. The act, which validated the Ukrainian Galician Army (UHA) incursions into Bukovina, alarmed the other members of the National Council, who requested the intervention of the Romanian Army under Iacob Zadig and, eventually, Bukovina's merger into Greater Romania. Though he still favored Greater Austrian federalism, Onciul welcomed the UHA. He then appointed himself governor al Moldovei de Sus ("Governor of Upper Moldavia"), warning Zadig and his troops to stay out or risk being massacred by the Ukrainians. According to Cocuz, this period constitutes "full-blown treason" and a "deplorable end" to Onciul's career.

Lupu was able to preserve his seat in the General Congress of Bukovina, which was soon after joined by returning exiles such as Doboș and Tofan. During Congress sessions, both he and Grigorovici contended that the partition plan had been a rational, rather than treasonous, option. Lupu then presented himself as leader of the "National Democratic Party", which in 1919 merged with Ion Nistor's mainstream nationalist and anti-Flondor group, the Democratic Union Party (PDU). In the November 1919 election, Lupu took a seat in the Romanian Assembly for Zastavna County. Though formally an independent, he was in practice backed by his Democratic Unionist allies. Publicly acknowledged as a PDU member, Tofan ran and won alongside Nistor in Rădăuți County. Both Simionovici and Voronca ran as independents in Cernăuți County, with only the former winning a seat. Meanwhile, Onciul found himself placed under arrest by the Romanian authorities, and, upon release, worked on plans for a large-scale land reform. The latter subject also preoccupied Lupu, who submitted an amendment regarding the application of land reform in Bessarabia. In one of his essays, published in 1919, Onciul acknowledged that Greater Romania had managed to fulfill the aspirations of his Bukovina constituents. As a final political act, he presented himself as a candidate in the election of May 1920. Onciul died in Bucharest, where he ran his own law firm, on September 30, 1921.

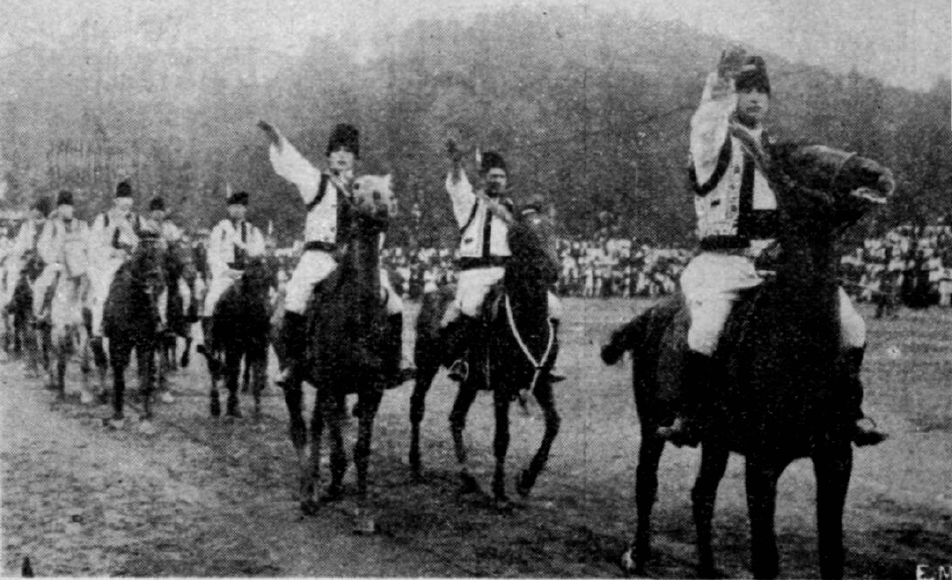
Arcași youth on horseback giving the Roman salute to Carol II (Bucșoaia, 1937)

The white-shirted Arcași groups were revived as independent paramilitary associations, and, reorganized by folklorist Valerian Dugan-Opaiț, had some 500,000 members and over 55 sections in 1926. The effort was reportedly slowed down by Romania's laws on corporate entities, which the mostly-peasant organizers had trouble interpreting. Also then, various sections were driven increasingly close to, and infiltrated by, the antisemitic far-right: as noted by Corbea-Hoișie, Onciul's own participation in diffusing antisemitic lore was partly responsible for this political evolution. From ca. 1923, various Arcași became sympathetic toward the National-Christian Defense League (LANC), and were in correspondence with its Bukovinian affiliate, Corneliu Zelea Codreanu, ultimately splitting from Dugan-Opaiț's apolitical mainstream.

In 1927, the LANC press also boasted a connection between the Arcași and Nicolae Totu, who had murdered the Jewish youth David Falik and was acquitted by a sympathetic jury. The following year, it published a piece by Dugan-Opaiț, who claimed that Nistor, as the Minister for Bukovina, wanted the Arcași banned, and that the movement had been marginalized during a national festival at Chișinău. The still-independent groups, supervised by Doboș (who was a member of the Senate of Romania), reorganized themselves in July of that year, allowing "each member to engage personally in whatever sort of politics". In 1930, some breakaway Arcași lodges became subsections of Codreanu's own Iron Guard. Others, in large part recovered and again reorganized by Dumitru Străchinaru, remained primarily loyal to the Romanian King, Carol II, and in 1935 marched at his "Feast of the Restoration". These Arcași received official protection, and by 1937 had expanded to 150 sections.

The Arcași movement and the Iron Guard were effectively banned in March 1937 by the government of Gheorghe Tătărescu, which made it illegal to wear political uniforms. However, in August of that year they were again active, and Carol was ceremoniously confirmed as their "Great Vornic". By 1938, with Romania placed under Carol's National Renaissance Front dictatorship, the Arcași remained an auxiliary of the regime, and Doboș returned as their leader. The movement was largely annexed to the larger organization, Straja Țării, itself led by a former Arcași youth, Teofil Sidorovici. In June 1938, they formed part of the Romanian delegation at the Strength Through Joy festival in Hamburg. Arcași groups disappeared under the Iron Guard's National Legionary State but were again revived by Doboș in 1943, this time as subgroups of the Society for Romanian Culture and Literature. The movement was ultimately disbanded in 1944.
