= Onciul =

Onciul is a Romanian surname. Notable people with the surname include:

- Aurel Onciul (1864–1921), Romanian political leader
- Dimitrie Onciul (1856–1923), Romanian historian
