= Democratic Union Party (Romania) =

Political party in Romania

Democratic Union Party Partidul Democrat al Unirei
- Leader: Ion Nistor
- Founded: April 1919
- Dissolved: January 1923
- Merged into: National Liberal Party
- Headquarters: Cernăuți, Kingdom of Romania
- Newspaper: Glasul Bucovinei
- Ideology: Ethnic nationalism (Romanian); Centralism
- Political position: Right-wing

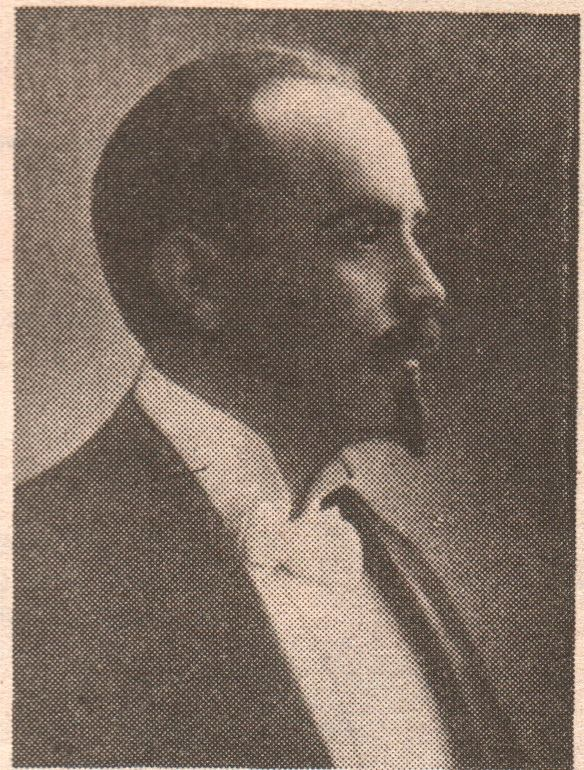
Adding per suggestion and notation in article

The Democratic Union Party (Romanian: Partidul Democrat al Unirei or Partidul Democrat al Unirii, PDU) was a political group in Romania, one of the political forces which claimed to represent the ethnic Romanian community of Bukovina province. The PDU was active in the wake of World War I, between 1919 and 1923, having for its leader the historian and nationalist militant Ion Nistor. It was formed by Nistor and other activists who wrote for the regional periodical Glasul Bucovinei, and, as a consequence, the party members were commonly referred to as Glasiști ("Glas-ists").

The PDU favored a centralist administration, pushed for Romanianization in public life, and was generally hostile to the centrifugal tendencies of other communities, primarily Ukrainians, Germans, Poles and Jews. These together formed a relative majority of Bukovina's population, and Nistor's agenda met with sustained opposition from all sides of the region's political spectrum, although the PDU was successful in rallying to its cause some individuals from all these communities. In addition, the PDU clashed with the moderate or autonomist Bukovinian Romanians, whose leaders were Aurel Onciul and Iancu Flondor.

Democratic Union politicians helped organize the administration of Bukovina, speeding its absorption into Greater Romania, and, in 1919, formed part of the government coalition backing Premier Alexandru Vaida-Voevod. The PDU was later allied to the dominant National Liberal Party (PNL), helping it return to power with a nationwide centralist agenda, consolidated by the adoption of a new Romanian Constitution, in 1923. The same year, Nistor merged his party into the PNL.

== Origins ==
Bukovina met World War I as an eastern province of Austria-Hungary, on the empire's border with the Kingdom of Romania. A Romanian traditional region, it had a Romanian plurality of 42 to 48% before 1918. Early in the war, a nationalist faction headed by Nistor refused to join the Austro-Hungarian Army and fled to Romania, where they organized a Committee of Bukovinian Refugees, nucleus of the future PDU groups and first publisher of Glasul Bucovinei. Over the following years, Nistor and his men became conjectural allies of the PNL Prime Minister Ion I. C. Brătianu, who declared war on Austria in 1916.

Bukovinians of all nationalities emancipated themselves as the Austro-Hungarian regime collapsed and, after war ended on all fronts, the region faced an uncertain future. Early on, the Romanians and the Ukrainians created rival representative bodies, which, in late October-early November 1918, voted each for its union project: Romanians for union with Romania, Ukrainians for merger into the West Ukrainian People's Republic. A partition agreement was mediated between Aurel Onciul of the Democratic Peasants' Party, who claimed to represent all Romanians, and Omelian Popovych of the Ukrainian movement. This allowed the Ukrainian Galician Army to organize incursions into Bukovina.

After the Austro-Hungarian administration had dissolved and the last governor (Josef Graf von Etzdorf) renounced power in favour of the Romanian and Ukrainian committees, the Ukrainian militias gained control of the province, and established a provisional government. The National Romanian Council reacted by demanding help from the Romanian Land Forces (General Iacob Zadig). The Romanian troops swiftly occupied the region, with little armed resistance from the Ukrainians, and installed martial law. Through a Congress of Nationalities held at Cernăuți, some of the various competing factions, who supported the preservation of integral Bukovina, came to an understanding. Bukovina's preservation and its union with Romania was sealed on November 28, 1918, although only the region's Romanians, Germans and Poles agreed that this should be unconditional. The Congress, which opened with a greeting to the Romanian Army, was boycotted by the Ukrainian and Jewish representatives. The Congress also renewed tensions between the two leaders of Bukovina's Romanian nationalist revival: Iancu Flondor, who supported regional autonomy and minority rights; and Nistor, who stood for ethnonationalism and welcomed centralized rule.

== Creation ==
On January 2, a hybrid and transitional regime was instituted in the region: Romanian King Ferdinand I was recognized as sovereign; a Ministry of Bukovina, with Ion Nistor and Iancu Flondor at its helm, took over the actual administration under a Brătianu premiership. Flondor resigned soon after, and, although Nistor took over his office in Cernăuți, the region experienced an acute political crisis. Flondor sent his complaints to the king in April 1919, implying that centralization was alienating everyone, including Romanians. The outgoing Minister-Delegate found a cautionary example in the neighboring Moldavian Democratic Republic, which had also been united with Romania a year before. He argued: "I have avoided fast and radical changes in the belief that [...] their consequences would be compromised, perhaps beyond repair, and that the same would go for the good cause of the people, as has happened in Bessarabia, haunted to this day by deep resentments versus the national ideal." By contrast, Nistor saw his government mission as being the Romanianization of the provincial administrative, judicial and schooling systems.

Over the next months, as the Romanian provisional military administration withdrew, Bukovina's civil society began expressing discontent. In June, General Nicolae Petala heard numerous groups expressing support for the autonomist option: Flondor's Romanian moderates and George Grigorovici of the Romanian Socialists; Ukrainian Kassian Bogatyrets; Germans Albert Kohlruss and Rudolf Gaidosch; Jews Mayer Ebner and Iacob Pistiner. Flondor, who regretted his earlier vote for unconditional union, threatened to call in international arbiters, and demanded that Romania cease its occupation of the West Ukrainian People's Republic. He was by then conceiving of a Bukovinian autonomous region extending out of the former Austro-Hungarian province and into Botoșani, Dorohoi, Hotin and Suceava territories.

Meanwhile, the Glasul Bucovinei group alone stood by the governing authority. Nistor supported centralism on principle, as a legalist, and (in agreement with the Romanian central authorities) viewed Flondor's compromise option as unsound. As early a December 1918, Nistor had tied the cause of autonomism with the marginalization of Romanian Bukovinians; its aim, he argued, was: "to erase all traces of the past and to smother the national consciousness of the native population." In his view: "Provincial politics have vanished on the very day of union." The Glas-ists were thus supportive of the new electoral law. Passed in August 1919, it dissolved the Diet of Bukovina while giving the region 40 representatives in the Romanian Parliament, introduced universal male suffrage, and ended the proportional representation of ethnic groups.

In September 1919, Nistor and his supporters founded the PDU as the political instrument of Romanian centralists. Its leading militants were folklorist Dimitrie Marmeliuc, historian Vasile Grecu, schoolteacher George Tofan (d. 1920), and, before December 1919, linguist Sextil Pușcariu.

== Nationalist clashes and 1919 elections ==
The PDU was confrontational on the national issue, as noted in Nistor's letter to Pușcariu: "As soon as the external threats cease, internal political struggles will break out with unprecedented vehemence. [...] The new will triumph." Their position was initially supported by the Polish community, who, at 4.2% of Bukovina's population, did not take issue with Romanian nationalism (see Polish–Romanian alliance). By contrast, the PDU was in conflict with the more sizable minorities. The Ukrainians tended to view Romanian rule as accidental, and expected assistance from the Ukrainian People's Republic. They were therefore apathetic when it came to the electoral battle, and some of the leading Ukrainian nationalist militants (Hierotheus Pihuliak, Stepan Smal-Stotskyi, Volodymyr Zalozetsky-Sas) even left the region in protest. The Ukrainian, Jewish, German and socialist political groups boycotted the November 1919 legislative election. As a countering measure to this abstentionist bloc, the PDU suggested co-opting individual politicians from minority groups into alliances with the Romanian parties.

The PDU was especially critical of the National Jewish Council, a triumvirate of Jewish politicians in Bukovina: Ebner, Pistiner, Benno Straucher. When the council, reacting against Romania's failure to emancipate its Jewish communities, called for international sanctions, Glasul Bucovinei resorted to antisemitic campaigning. In the 1919 suffrage, Nistor enlisted (or, according to Flondor's supporters, coerced) Jewish inspector Heini Teller into registering in as a traveling companion of the PDU, but Teller eventually withdrew from the race when faced with his coreligionists' indignant reaction. The PDU list of Senate candidates then included Jewish entrepreneur Jakob Hecht. Hecht spoke in favor of complete and unconditional union, in statements which, at the time, infuriated the Jewish Council. The Senate list was completed by another Jew, Iosif Vihovici of Coțmani.

There was a similar disagreement between the PDU and Bukovina's Germans. The Romanian party claimed that it had supported the creation of a German constituency, but that the Germans, being spread out between villages, were ungroupable. The National German Council, resentful of early Romanianization attempts, refused to sign for an alliance with Nistor. In this case as well, the PDU was able to enlist a dissident German, Norbert Kipper (Chiper), among its own candidates for the Assembly. The party was even able to affiliate two Ukrainians, Vasily Snyatynchuk of Orășeni (Coțmani) and the Mayor of Ocna. Stanisław (Stanislaus) Kwiatkowski, the first Bukovina Pole to serve in Parliament, was also close to Nistor and, after taking his seat, became a PDU member.

The PDU sent twenty Bukovinians, its leader included, to Parliament—Nistor himself was to be reelected for successive terms, until 1938. A Bukovinian telegram, published by the central and regional press on November 7, informed: "The candidates of the Democratic Union Party under Mr. Nistor's leadership have won seats everywhere, in Cernăuți as well as in the other parts of Bukovina. [...] The elections were carried out in the most profound peacefulness." All of the PDU's ethnic minority candidates had been elected to either Senate of Assembly, but the others' boycott was still effectively sending the message of Bukovinian disobedience. The party also coopted the last 2 Marshals of the Duchy of Bukovina, Georg Wassilko von Serecki and Alexandru N. Hurmuzachi. Both were elected to the Senate, with Wassilko representing Văscăuți and Hurmuzachi representing Siret.

== 1920 elections ==
The 1919 legislature ratified the act of union and saw the signing of the Saint-Germain Treaty, which awarded it formal recognition. The PDU briefly parted with the PNL and supported the opposition. After negotiations, the PDU, the Democratic Nationalist Party and the Bessarabian Peasants' Party were included in the parliamentary bloc formed by the Peasants' Party and the Romanian National Party. The bloc held power, with Alexandru Vaida-Voevod as Prime Minister, but King Ferdinand's refusal to accept its land reform project brought down the cabinet.

Newly appointed Premier Alexandru Averescu dissolved Parliament on March 25, 1920. After April 5, 1920, a Unification Commission deposed all that remained of Bukovina's autonomous administration, and Nistor resigned from his Bukovina Minister post. However, in the 1920 election, the PDU, which ran together with its former electoral bloc colleagues, faced significant opposition from Averescu's People's Party (PP). The PP successfully signed up some prominent supporters of conditional union. Elected to Parliament as an ethnic German PP candidate, Kohlruss rekindled the campaign for cultural autonomy, and received virulent replies from the PDU, through Glasul Bucovinei. The PDU's own ethnic minority candidate was Vihovici, elected to the Assembly in Coțmani. Overall, the PDU had three elected representatives in the Assembly.

By then, the PDU and it paper were primarily supporters of the centralist policy on education, and applauded the disestablishment of German, Jewish or other schools, noting that they overrepresented their respective minority groups. This, and the complete lack of Polish representation in the 1920 Parliament, created tensions between Nistor's supporters and the Polish community. In May 1920, the National Polish Council presented King Ferdinand with a memorandum. Although stating that the administration had been beyond reproach as far as the Poles were concerned, the document noted that the unwillingness to create a Polish constituency was an "injustice" on Nistor's part, "which may lead to Polish irredentism". Nistor issued a formal reply, arguing that the number of Poles was too small to validate the preservation of Austro-Hungarian electoral customs.

Around 1920, the party was taking an interest into various other problems specific to Bukovina's rural society. The PDU took a stance on the issue of logging rights, giving support to peasants who complained that the PP had been arbitrarily handing out major grants of forest terrain to its clientele. Glasul Bucovinei discussed the issue of worthless Austrian war bonds, which the peasants had bought in good faith during the 1910s, and issued warnings about the unexploded ordnance which posed threats on the lives of agricultural workers.

== 1922 elections and 1923 merger ==
Before the 1922 election, Nistor and his party were committed partners of the PNL, Romania's main centralist movement. Shortly before the election date was set, the PDU was co-opted in Brătianu's new cabinet, created through an understanding with King Ferdinand. Nicolae Petala's government gazette Cultura Poporului gave positive coverage to the new governing alliance. Brătianu's platform, it argued, was one of "order, good governance, legality and justice." Reportedly, the National Liberals had tried to co-opt all unionist parties into this new cartel, but only Nistor and the Bessarabian Peasantists could be persuaded to join.

The PDU was part of a cartel with the PNL and the Bessarabian Peasants' Party, which faced three other alliances: the Citizens' Bloc of Democratic Nationalists and Conservative-Democrats; the Peasants' Party-Romanian National Party group; and the PP's common list with the Progressive Conservatives. The PDU's own Bukovina list of candidates featured three PNL members, all of them based outside the region—Brătianu for Rădăuți, Alexandru Constantinescu-Porcu for Vijnița, Artur Văitoianu for Zastavna. More controversially, Nistor adhered to the PNL's philosophy on elections, and in particular the notion that election results needed to be corrected in areas where the electorate was hostile or inexperienced.

By then, Nistor had come to a disagreement with the Democratic Nationalist leader Nicolae Iorga, who urged him not to align himself with Romania's traditional partisan politics, and especially not with Brătianu's men. The anti-Liberal nationalist Iorga was bitter about the PDU's political choices, and privately called Nistor "a nullity". From his new home in Transylvania, Sextil Pușcariu also watched with concern as Nistor became Brătianu's man of confidence; he was himself a supporter of Iorga. While its nationalist basis was threatened, the PDU was again able to list minority representatives as its candidates. This category includes Kipper and even the PDU's former rival Benno Straucher, who had since lost Jewish community backing.

Eventually, in January 1923, the PDU was absorbed into the PNL. In so doing, Brătianu's Bukovinian allies helped the PNL overcome a crisis of confidence: the National Liberal group was strengthened by arrivals from the PDU and the Bessarabian Peasantists. When the PNL-endorsed 1923 Constitution of Romania was finally adopted, Bukovina became an integral part of the Kingdom (or "Greater Romania"). As Minister of State for Bukovina (between 1924 and 1926), Nistor signed up to the PNL's Romanianization agenda. His term saw the closure of more minority schools, especially Jewish, German and Ukrainian ones.

== Electoral history ==
=== Legislative elections ===
| Election | Votes | % | Assembly | Senate | Position |
|---|---|---|---|---|---|
| 1919 | | | 20 / 568 | 7 / 216 | 6th |
| 1920 | | | 1 / 366 | 0 / 166 | 12th |
| 1922 | | | 15 / 372 | 0 / 148 | 5th |
