= Florea Lupu =

Imperial Austrian-born Romanian lawyer and politician

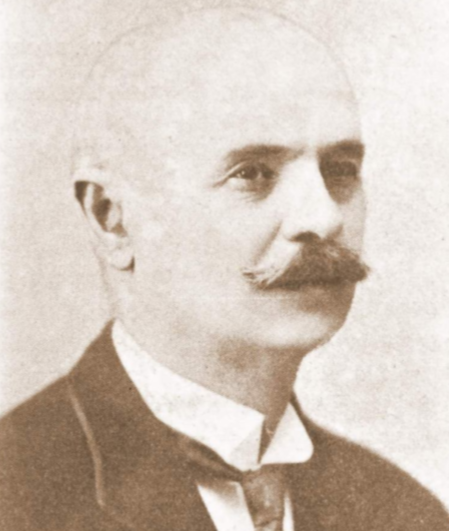

Florea Lupu (August 30, 1863–January 28, 1939) was an Imperial Austrian-born Romanian lawyer and politician.

Born in Volcineț, he completed the state gymnasium in Rădăuți in 1885, followed by the law faculties of Czernowitz and Vienna Universities. He received a law doctorate from Czernowitz in 1890. He worked at the finance department, the legal bar and the notary public. From 1894, he was an editor at the official gazette of Austria-Hungary, the Reichsgesetzblatt. In 1895, he became secretary at the Suceava courthouse, advancing to adviser the following year. He became president of the Bukovina state bank in 1904. In 1905, he founded the Romanian School Association of Bukovina.

Lupu successively joined the Romanian Conservative Party of Bukovina (1900), the Democratic Peasants’ Party of Bukovina (1903), the Romanian National Party (1905), the Romanian Christian Social Party of Bukovina (1908) and the Democratic Peasants' Party (1914). A city councilor, he served in the House of Deputies from 1901 to 1905, and in the Diet of Bukovina. A member of the Romanian National Council of Bukovina, he participated in the congress that approved the union of Bukovina with Romania in late November 1918. He was elected to the Assembly of Deputies for Zastavna in the first parliament of Greater Romania. From 1922 to 1924, he headed a bank in Cernăuți, where he died. He was the brother-in-law of Aurel Onciul.
