= Moravian Diet =

Moravian Diet Moravský zemský sněm Mährisches Landtag
- Legislative body of the Margraviate of Moravia
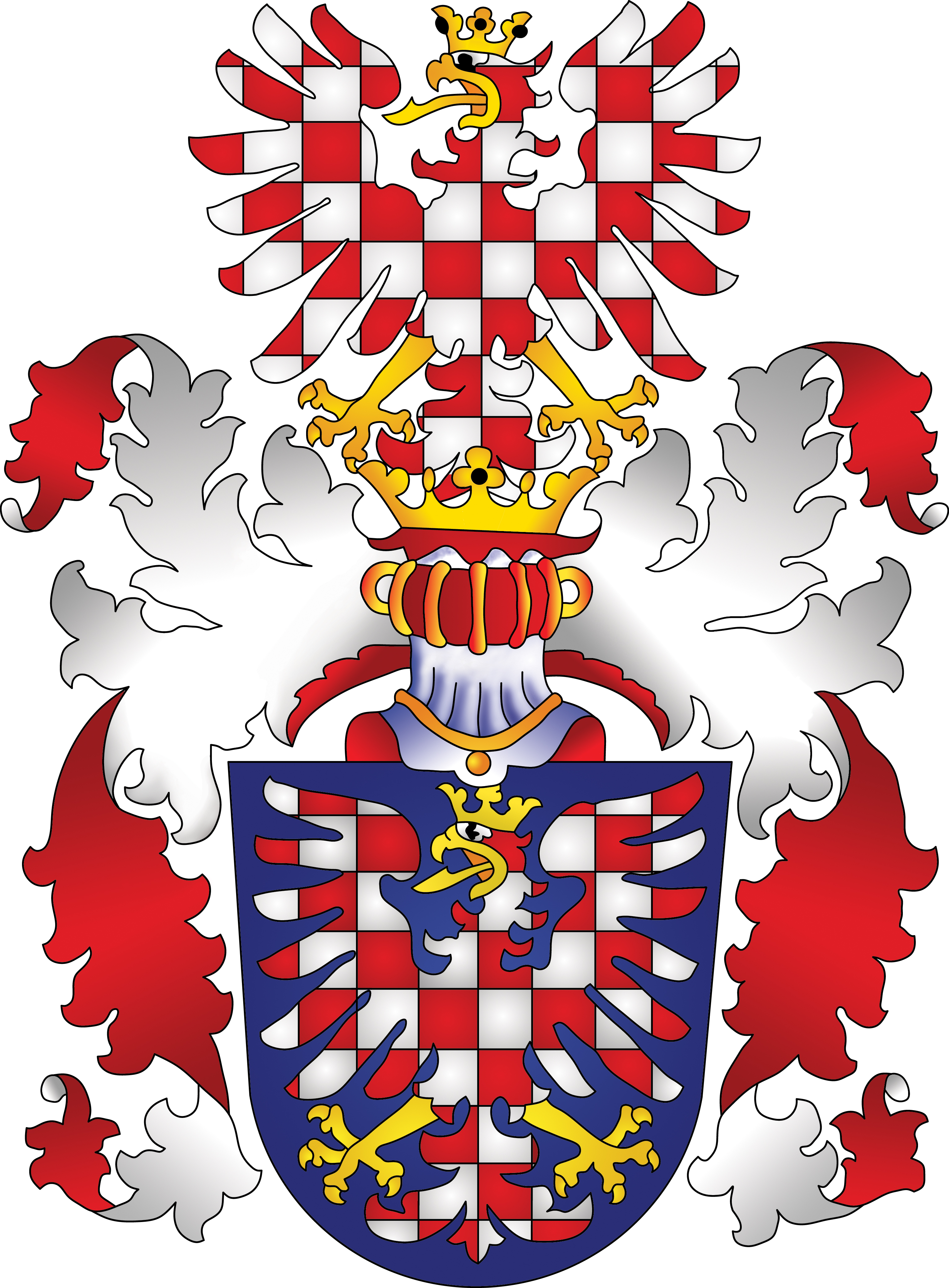

Type
- Type: Tricameral
- Chambers: Curia of Lords (nobility); Curia of Clergy; Curia of Knights and Towns

History
- Established: 1861 - last stage
- Disbanded: 1918 (unformal), 1920 (formal by Constitution of Czechoslovakia 1920
- Preceded by: Moravian Diet of Estates, since 1288
- Succeeded by: Národní shromáždění republiky Československé/National Assembly of Czechoslovakia
- Seats: 151 (at dissolution)

Elections
- Voting system: Curial elections (last stage)
- Last election: The Diet Elections of Country Moravia 15.6. - 8.7. 1913

Meeting place
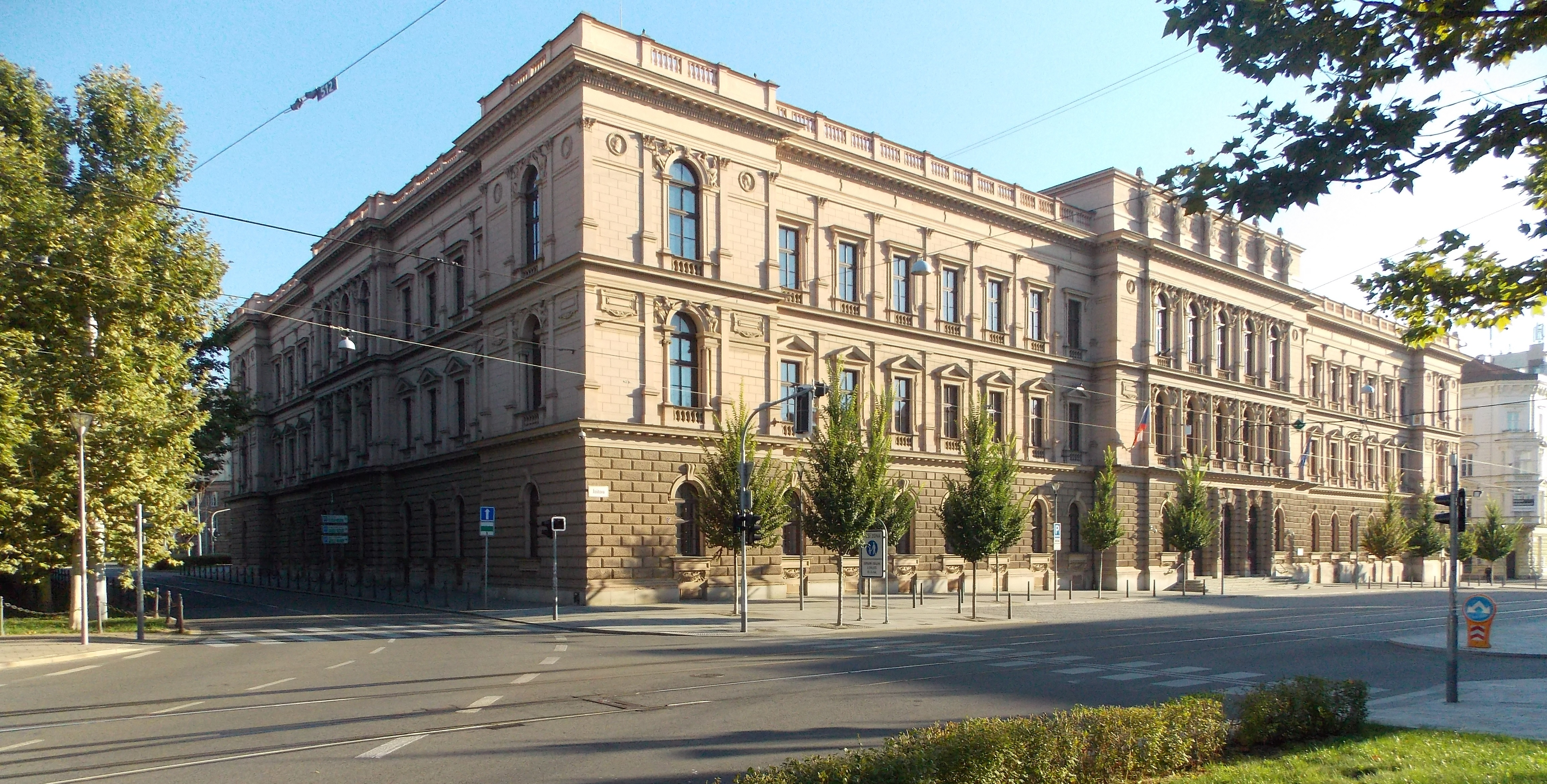
- Moravian Diet house, Brno, (Czech Constitutional court current days)

The Moravian Diet (Latin: Moraviae generali colloquio; Czech: Moravský zemský sněm; earlier Moravský stavovský sněm; German: Mährisch-ständische Landtag) was the legislature of Moravia, the general assembly of the estates of the Margraviate of Moravia. It emerged from earlier informal assemblies known as the Moravian corporate Diet (or Diet of the estates of the Moravian Lands).

== History ==
=== Origins ===
The first session of the Moravian Diet took place in 1254. It was convened in Brno, then the capital city of Moravia, by King Přemysl Otakar II. Regular sessions started in 1288 and met alternately in Brno and Olomouc (both cloisters of the Dominican Order). After 1663, it met only in Brno.

=== The Liberal Constitution ===
During the Revolutions of 1848 (Spring of Nations), a Moravian constitutional assembly was held from 31 May 1848 until 21 January 1849. On 19 September 1848, the assembly adopted the Moravian Constitution (German: Der Ferfassung für das Markgrafthum Mähren, Czech: Zřízení pro Markrabství Moravské), in compliance with the principles of the Federal Constitution, state representative government, and civil liberties. This proposal was not ratified by Emperor Francis Joseph I.

=== Moravian Compromise ===
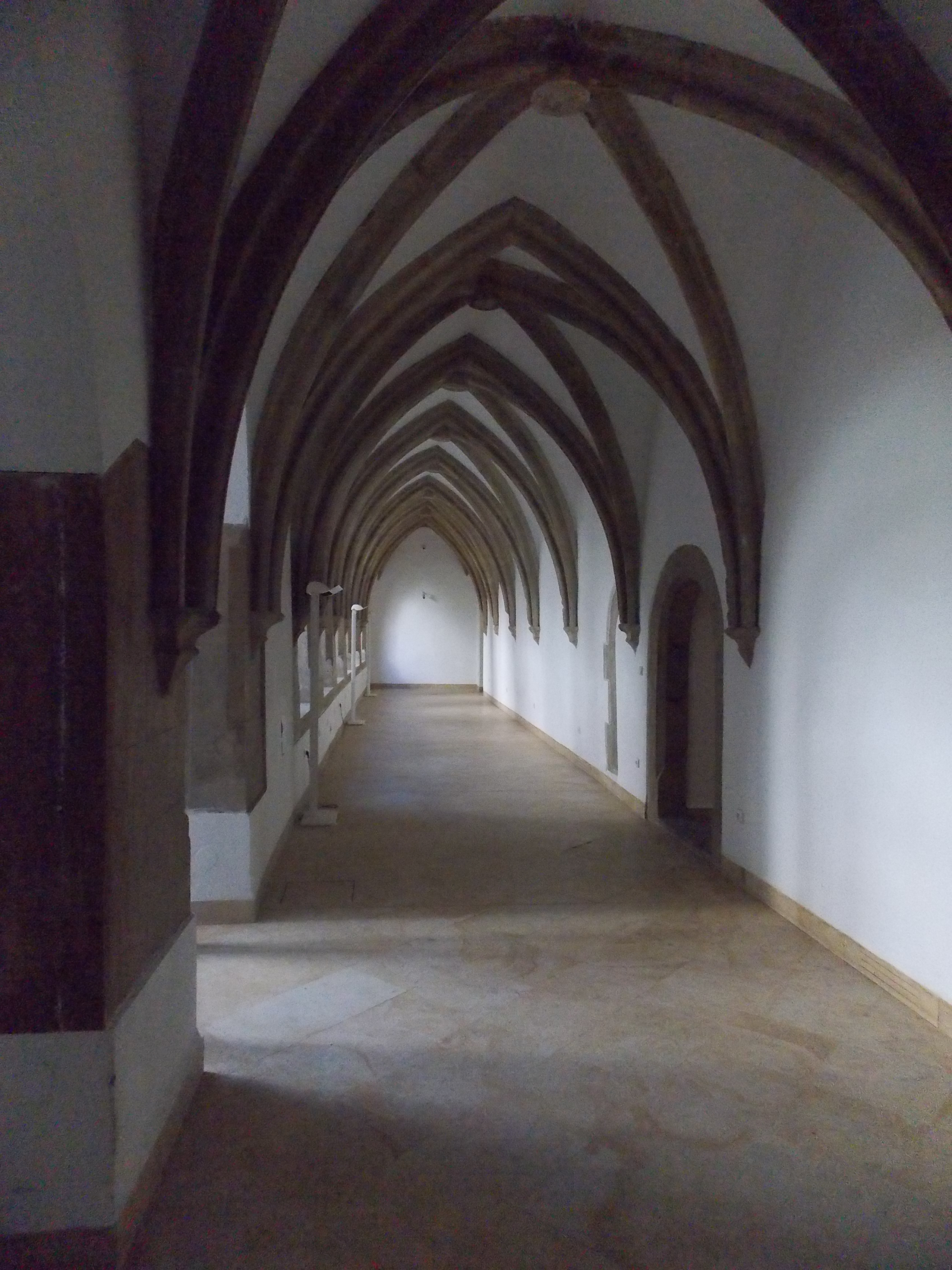
Early session room of the Moravian Diet (13th C.) - Cloister of the Dominican monastery in Brno

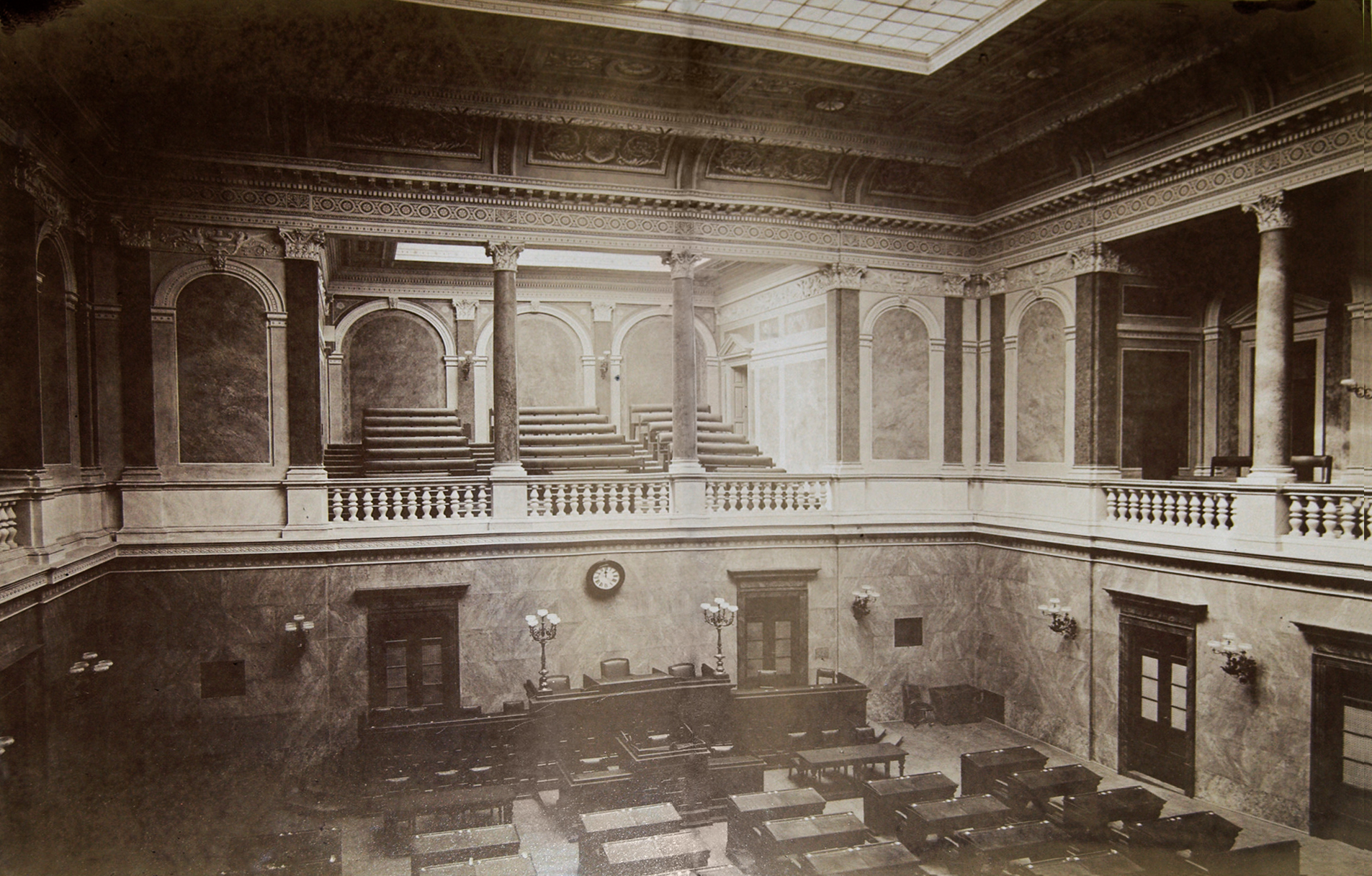
Debating chamber (Assembly hall) in the new house of parliament 1878

On 27 November 1905, leading members of the Moravian Diet from both the Czech- and German-speaking communities of Moravia agreed to a political compromise that divided power in the provincial diet between Czechs, Germans, and members of the landowning and ecclesiastical aristocracy, known as the Moravian Compromise. Despite the ongoing language dispute between Czechs and Germans, a compromise acceptable to both sides was found allowing a harmonious coexistence.

The Moravian Compromise of 1905 was a compromise agreement over what national equality of rights meant in practice, which found numerical expression in the proportions set for the staffing of nationally shared public institutions and the funding of nationally devolved ones, such as schools.

Electoral conditions were altered so as to add (in addition to the three electoral classes of landowners, urban taxpayers, and rural taxpayers) a fourth universal electoral class consisting of every qualified voter; separate German and Czech electoral districts were established according to the national land registers; and curia of the separate nationalities were instituted to settle all disputes involving the question of nationality. The question of language in the case of the autonomous national and district authorities was settled on a bilingual basis, and school boards were divided according to nationality. Although, by accepting these reforms, the Germans lost their previous majority in the Diet, they gave their consent to the changes in the interests of public peace.

Politically, the Margraviate of Moravia was an Austrian crown land, with the highest administrative authority vested in the governor in Brno. The Diet consisted of 149 deputies: 2 members with individual votes, the Archbishop of Olomouc and the Bishop of Brno; 30 members of the landed interests (10 German, 20 Czech); 3 deputies from the chamber of commerce in Brno and in Olomouc; 40 representatives of the towns (20 German, 20 Czech); 51 representatives of the rural communities (14 German); and 20 deputies from the electoral curia (6 German). In the Imperial Council (reichsrat) of the Austrian Crownlands in Vienna, Moravia was represented by 49 deputies.

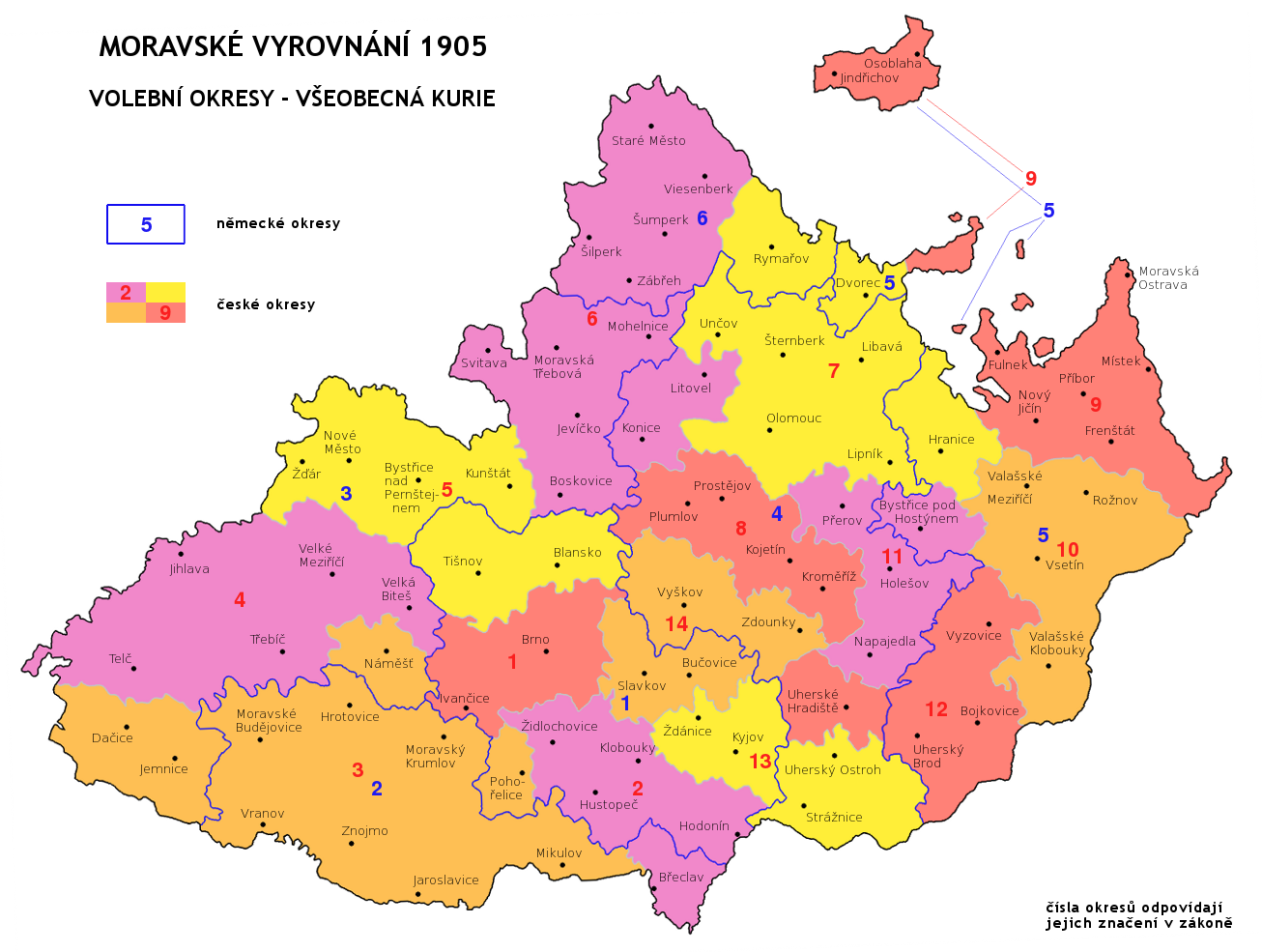
Moravian Compromise 1905, The map of new constituencies - General curia

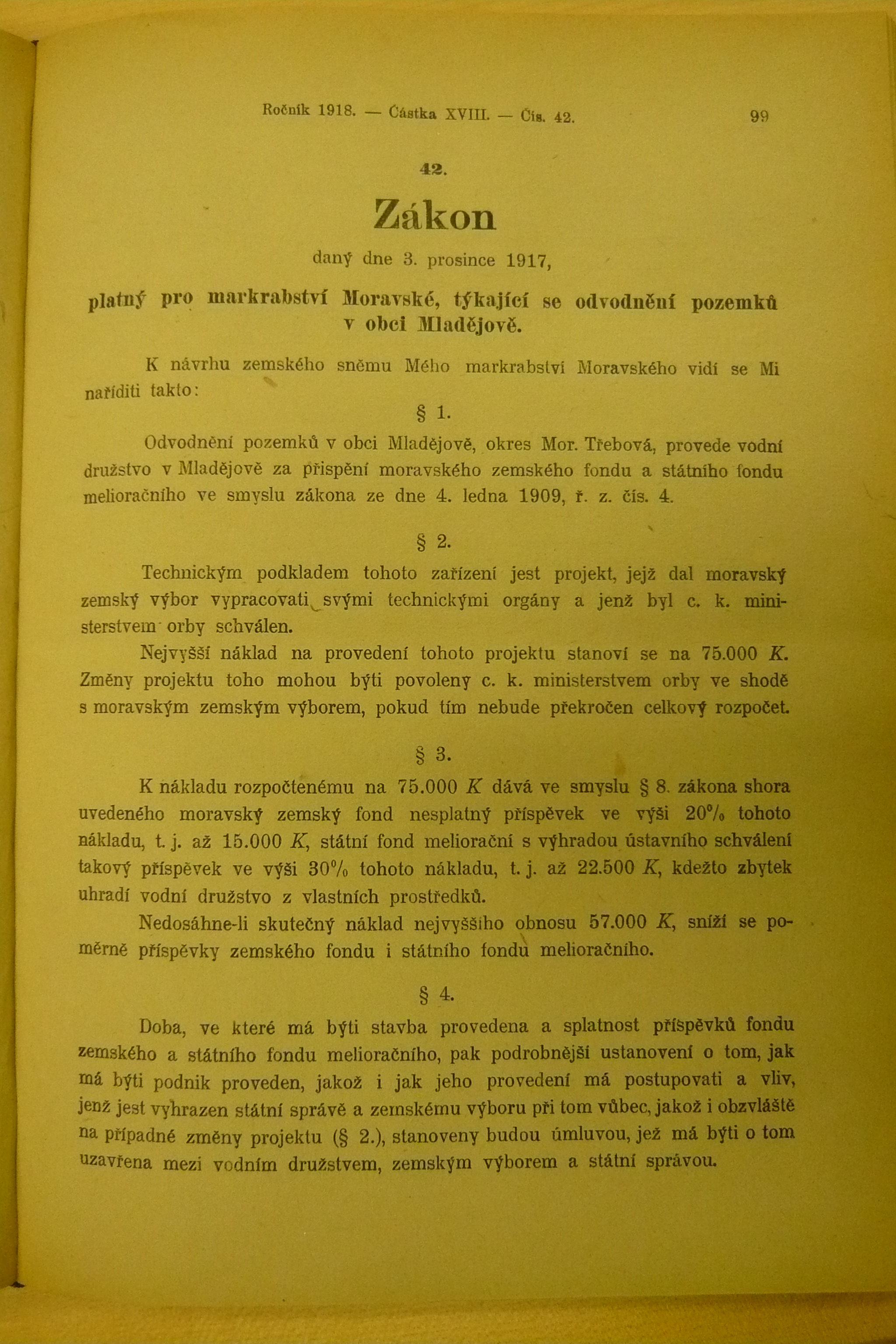
The very last one was Act No 42/1918 (Dig.)

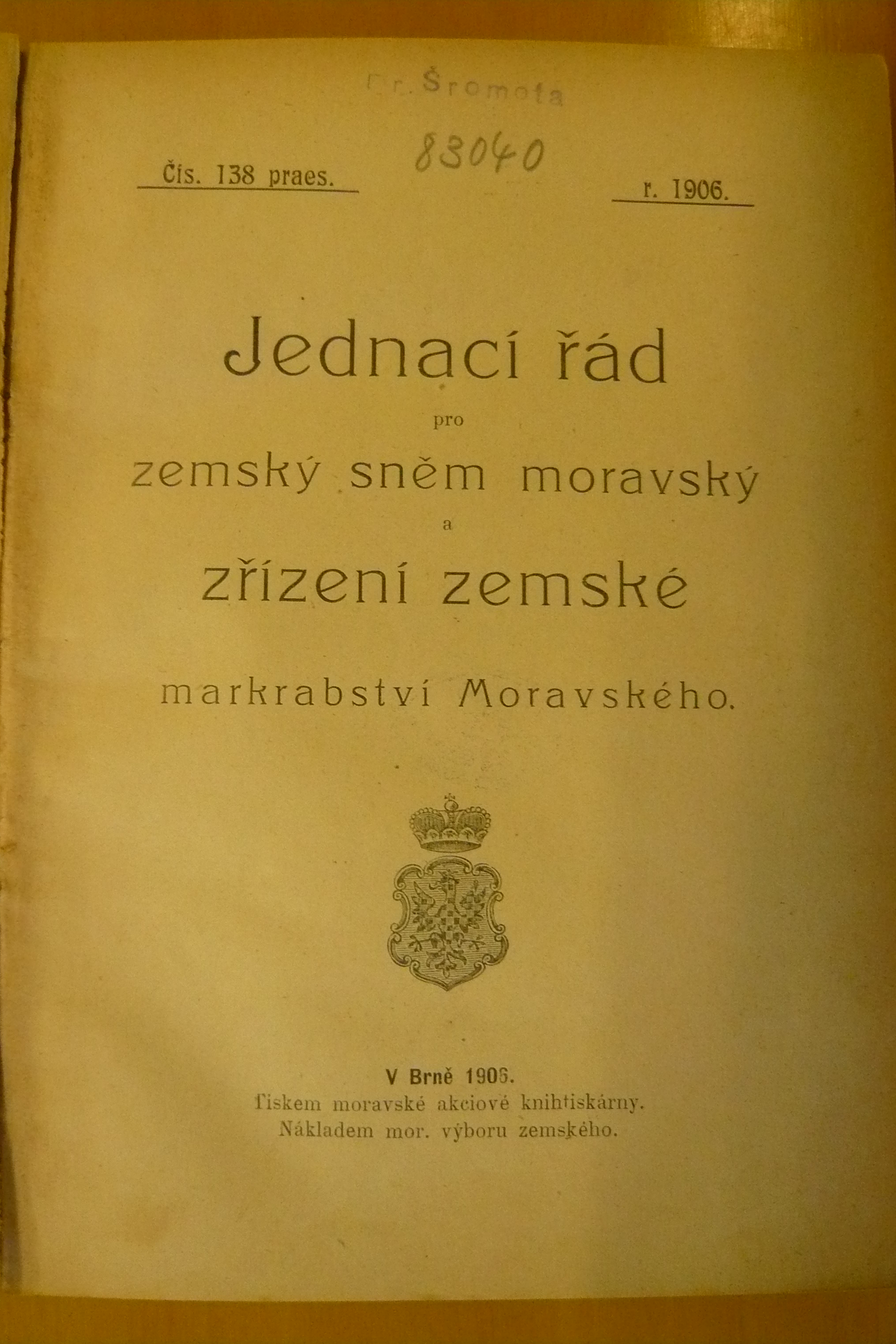
The last Moravian Constitution and Rules of Procedure of Moravian Diets

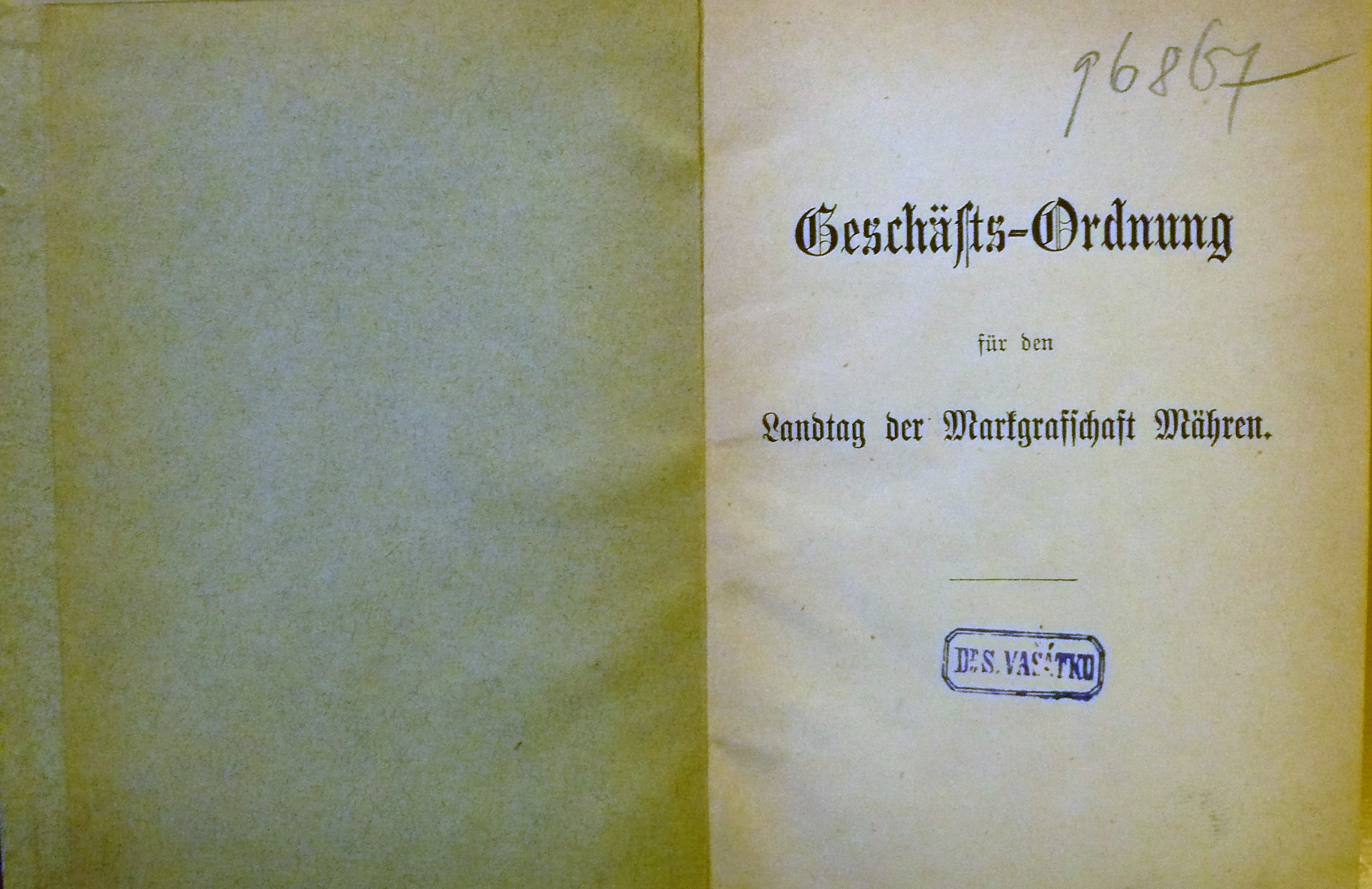
Rules of Procedure, German
