= Ioan Volcinschi =

Ioan Volcinschi (May 5, 1846–May 27, 1910) was an ethnic Romanian physician and politician in the Duchy of Bukovina, within Austria-Hungary.

Born in Tărășeni, north of Siret, he attended high school in Cernăuți. In 1871, he graduated from the medical faculty of Vienna University, where he also obtained a doctorate. He was the first Bukovinan specialized in obstetrics. In 1879, he became assisting physician and professor at Cernăuți's births institute and midwifery school. From 1883 until his death, he was its director. He was a public health adviser, vice president of the Bukovina medical association and professor of hygiene at the seminary institute of the Orthodox Metropolis.

In 1900, Volcinschi became president of the Romanian Conservative Party of Bukovina. From 1890 until his death, he sat in the Diet of Bukovina. In 1890, he joined the Concordia political society, and was a founding member of Gazeta Bucovinei. He was part of the national council (the provincial government), where he worked to set up hospitals. He was concerned with fighting against pellagra, then a rather widespread ailment, proposing dietary changes in the villages where it was detected.

Volcinschi published scientific studies (observations and interesting case studies) in Viennese and German medical journals. In 1883, he published the first Romanian-language textbook of midwifery; the book tended to use Romanian rather than specialized foreign vocabulary. He was also an accomplished surgeon. He was part of the leadership of the Society for Romanian Culture and Literature in Bukovina. In 1897, Rădăuți made him an honorary citizen. He died in Cernăuți.
