= Cernăuți County =

County in Romania

Județul Cernăuți
- County (Județ)
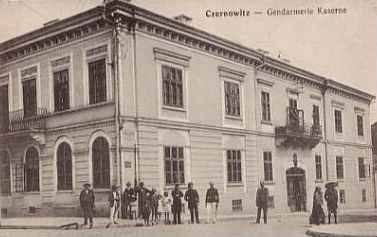
- Cernăuți County prefecture building of the interwar period

- Coat of arms

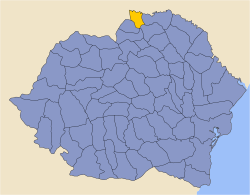
- Country: Rumania
- Historic region: Bukovina
- Capital city (Reședință de județ): Cernăuți
- Established: 18 December 1918 (Decree No. 3715 for the administration of Bukovina; first time); 1941 (second time)
- Ceased to exist: 1940 (first time); 1944 (second time)

Government
  - Type: Prefect

Area
  - Total: 1,771 km^{2} (684 sq mi)

Population (1930)
  - Total: 305,097
  - Density: 172.3/km^{2} (446.2/sq mi)
- Time zone: UTC+2 (EET)
  - Summer (DST): UTC+3 (EEST)

Cernăuți County was a county (județ) of Romania, in Bukovina, with the capital city at Cernăuți. The area was incorporated into the Soviet Union in 1940 (after the Soviet occupation of Northern Bukovina) and again in 1944 (after the Soviet occupation of Romania), and has been part of Ukraine since 1991.

== History ==
Following the Union of Bukovina with Romania decided by the General Congress of Bukovina on 15/28 November 1918, the Cernăuți County was created on 18 December 1918 by the Decree No. 3715 for the administration of Bukovina.

In 1925, according to the Law of Administrative Unification of 14 June 1925, the territory of the county was enlarged in the north with the former Zastavna and Cozmeni counties.

In 1938, the county was abolished and incorporated into the newly formed Ținutul Suceava, together with the counties of Hotin, Suceava, Storojineț, Dorohoi, Rădăuți and Câmpulung.

In 1940, following the Molotov–Ribbentrop Pact and the Soviet ultimatum on 26 June 1940, Northern Bukovina (including the whole Cernăuți County) was occupied by the Soviet Union and incorporated into the USSR (Chernivtsi Oblast, Ukrainian SSR). Cernăuți County was re-established (as part of the Bukovina Governorate) after Northern Bukovina was recovered by Romania in July 1941, following the invasion of the Soviet Union. Nevertheless, in August 1944 the Northern Bukovina was taken over again by the Soviet Army, and the borders as of 1 January 1941 were confirmed by the 1947 Paris Peace Treaties.

== Geography ==
Neighbours of the county were Stanisławów Voivodeship of Poland to the north and west, and counties of Storojineţ and Dorohoi to the south and Hotin to the east.

== Administration ==
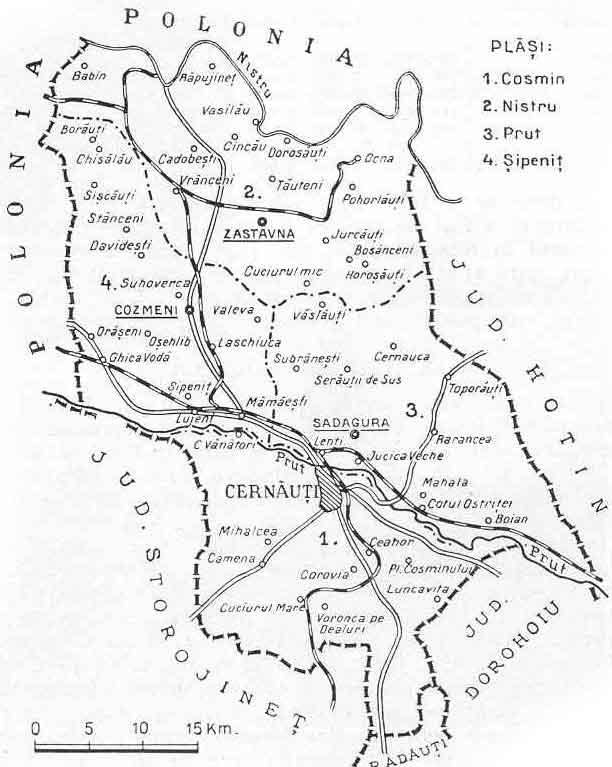
Map of Cernăuți County as constituted in 1938

The county consisted of four plăși (districts):

- Plasa Cosmin, headquartered at Cernăuți
- Plasa Nistru, headquartered at Zastavna
- Plasa Prut, headquartered at Sadagura
- Plasa Șipeniț, headquartered at Cozmeni

== Coat of arms ==
The coat of arms featured three trees, one of which was white, under two crossed swords.

== Demographics ==
=== Population ===
According to the Romanian census of 1930, the population of Cernăuți County was 305,097, of which 48.9% were ethnic Ukrainians, 21.8% ethnic Romanians, 13.1% ethnic Jews, 12.5% ethnic Germans and 4.6% ethnic Poles, as well as other minorities. Classified by religion: 78.1% were Orthodox Christian, 9.1% Jewish, 9.1% Roman Catholic, 1.9% Greek Catholic, as well as other minorities.

=== Urban population ===
As of 1930, there were four urban population centres in the county: Cernăuți with 111,147 people, Sadagura with 9,005, Zastavna with 5,038, and Cozmeni with 5,015.

In 1930 the urban population of Cernăuți was 130,205, which included 29.1% Jews, 25.9% Romanians, 23.3% Germans, 11.3% Ukrainians, 8.8% Romani, 7.5% Poles and 1.6% Russians by ethnicity, as well as other minorities.

== Gallery ==
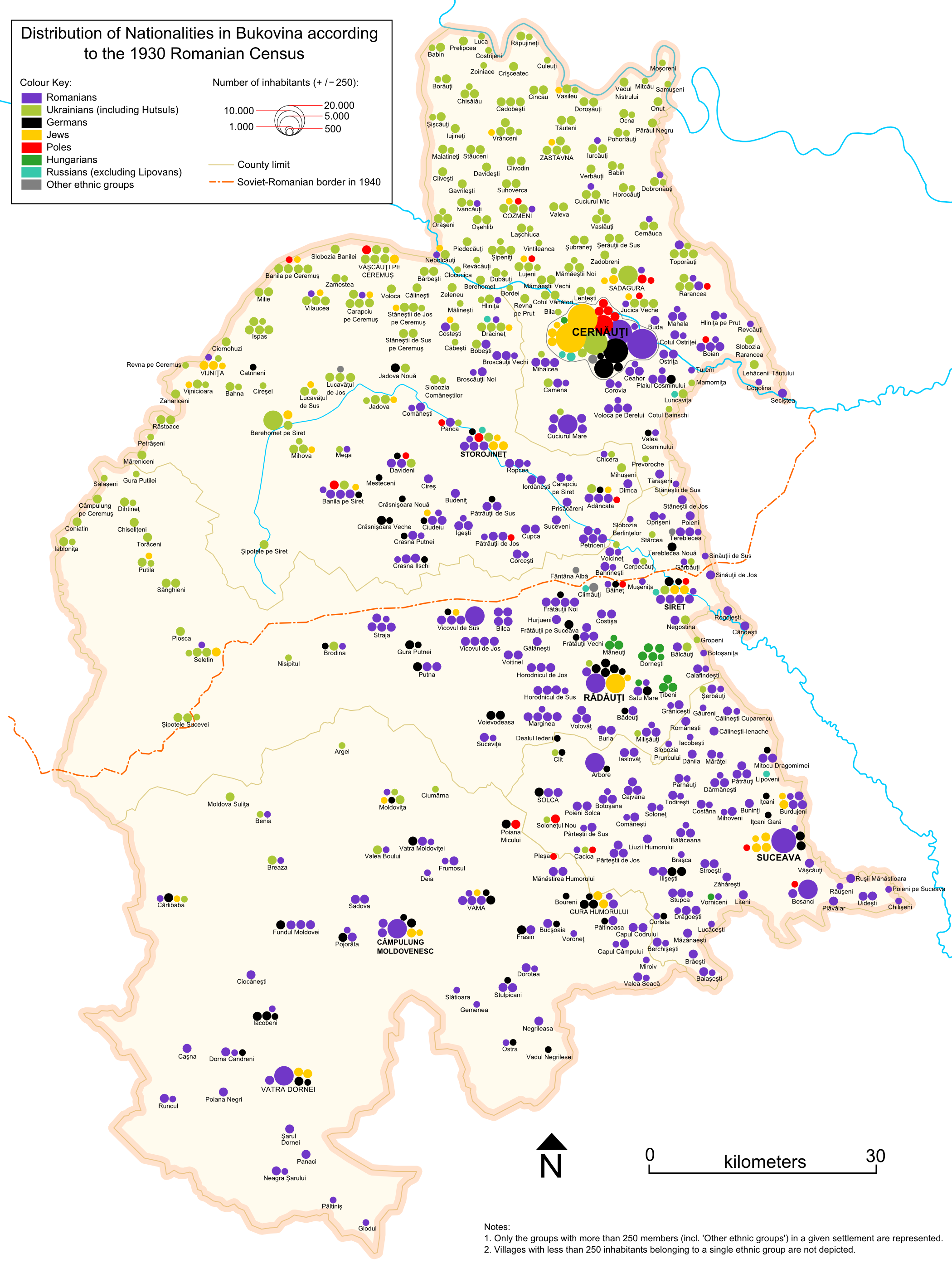
Demographic composition of Bukovina in 1930, with the 1940 border drawn in the centre

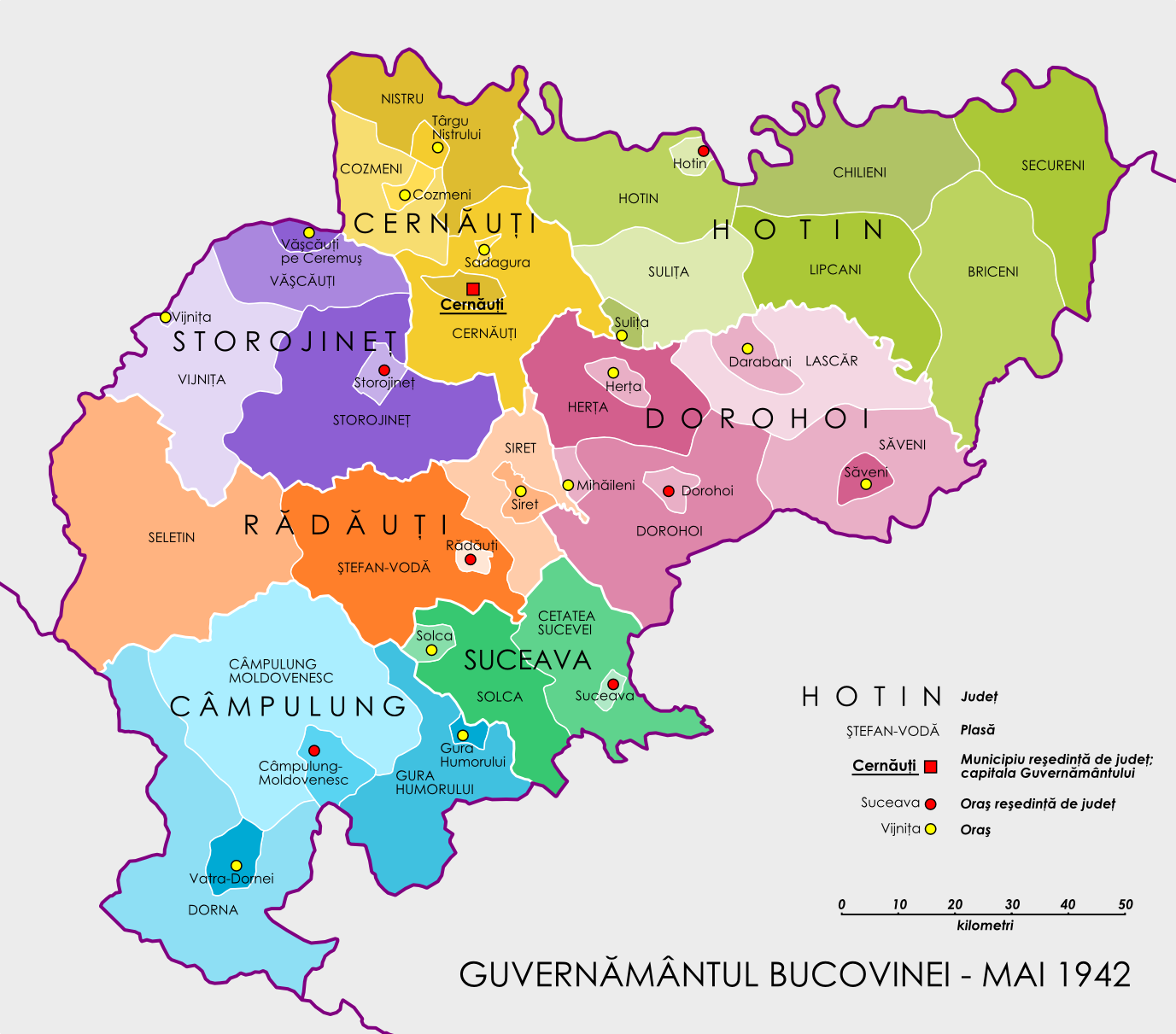
Governorate of Bukovina (1942)
