= Aurel Onciul =

Romanian politician (1864 – 1921)

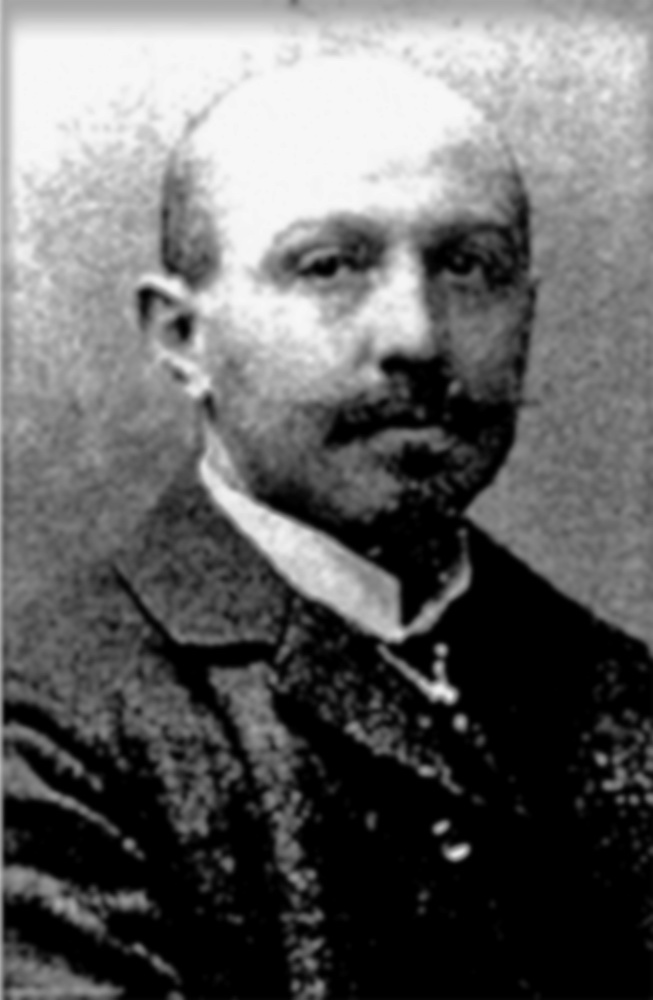
Aurel Onciul

Aurel Onciul (29 February 1864 – 30 September 1921) was a Romanian pro-Austrian political leader in the Austrian Bukovina, prior to its union with the Kingdom of Romania.

He was born in Vicovu de Sus, now in Suceava County, Romania, and graduated with a law degree from the University of Vienna. At the end of World War I, he advocated a division of the province of Bukovina along ethnic lines, into a Romanian-controlled southern Bukovina, and a Ukrainian-controlled northern Bukovina. The borders envisioned by Onciul and his Ukrainian counterparts correspond roughly to the present Romanian–Ukrainian borders in Bukovina.

He collaborated with Iancu Flondor, a boyar of Storozhynets (the other famous politician in Bukovina), and tried to appeal to a social-democratic oriented segment of rural population, clergy, and rural teachers, as leader of the Democratic Peasants' Party. Accused of machiavellianism, Onciul failed to attract the support of intellectuals, who were more concerned with the national question at the time, after the failure of the Ausgleich in 1909. Furthermore, in the Romanian parts of Bukovina, he failed to win popular support as he often sided with Ruthenian demands over lands in northern Bukovina.

As the Austrian governor surrendered power to Onciul in 1918, he and the Ukrainians proceeded to divide the former province between themselves much as Onciul had previously envisioned. His rival Iancu Flondor, leader of the National Party, denounced Onciul's intentions and proceeded to demand the intervention of Romania, putting an end to the agreement by Onciul and the Ukrainians regarding Bukovina. With Romanian troops securing the region, Flondor called on a General Congress of Bukovina, where members of various ethnicities, except Ruthenian, decided on an unconditional union with the Kingdom of Romania.
