= United States of Greater Austria =

Proposed federal state in Central Europe

Proposed map of the United States of Greater Austria, superimposed on the major ethnic groups of Austria-Hungary

The United States of Greater Austria (German: Vereinigte Staaten von Groß-Österreich) was an unrealised proposal made in 1906 to federalize Austria-Hungary to help resolve widespread ethnic and nationalist tensions. It was conceived by a group of scholars surrounding Archduke Franz Ferdinand of Austria, notably by the ethnic Romanian lawyer and politician Aurel Popovici.

== Nationality conflict ==
The first program for the federalisation of the Habsburg Empire was developed by the Hungarian nobleman Wesselényi Miklós. In his work titled Szózat a magyar és a szláv nemzetiség ügyében, published in Hungarian in 1843 and in German in 1844, he proposed not only social reforms but reforms of the state structure of the Empire and its nationality policy. He aimed to replace the centralized empire with a federation of five states: a German state, a state of Bohemia and Moravia, Galicia as a Polish state, the Italian part of Lombardy and Istria, and the state of historical Hungary.

Another idea came from Hungarian revolutionary Lajos Kossuth: "True liberty is impossible without federalism". Kossuth proposed to transform the Habsburg Empire into a "Danubian State", a federal republic with autonomous regions.

The Austro-Hungarian Compromise of 1867 established the dual monarchy of Austria-Hungary. The Compromise partially re-established the sovereignty of the Kingdom of Hungary, separate from and no longer subject to the Austrian Empire. However, the favouritism shown to the Magyars, the second largest ethnic group in the dual monarchy after the Germans, caused discontent on the part of other ethnic groups like the Slovaks and Romanians.

In 1900 the greatest problem facing the dual monarchy of Austria-Hungary was that it consisted of about a dozen distinctly different ethnic groups, of which only two, the Germans and Hungarians (who together accounted for about 43% of the total population), wielded any power or control. The other ethnic groups, which were not involved in the state affairs, included Slavic (Bosniaks, Croats, Czechs, Poles, Ruthenians, Serbs, Slovaks, Slovenes and Ukrainians) and Romance peoples (Italians, Romanians). Among them, only Croats had limited autonomy in the Kingdom of Croatia and Slavonia. In the Kingdom of Hungary, several ethnic minorities faced increased pressures of Magyarization.

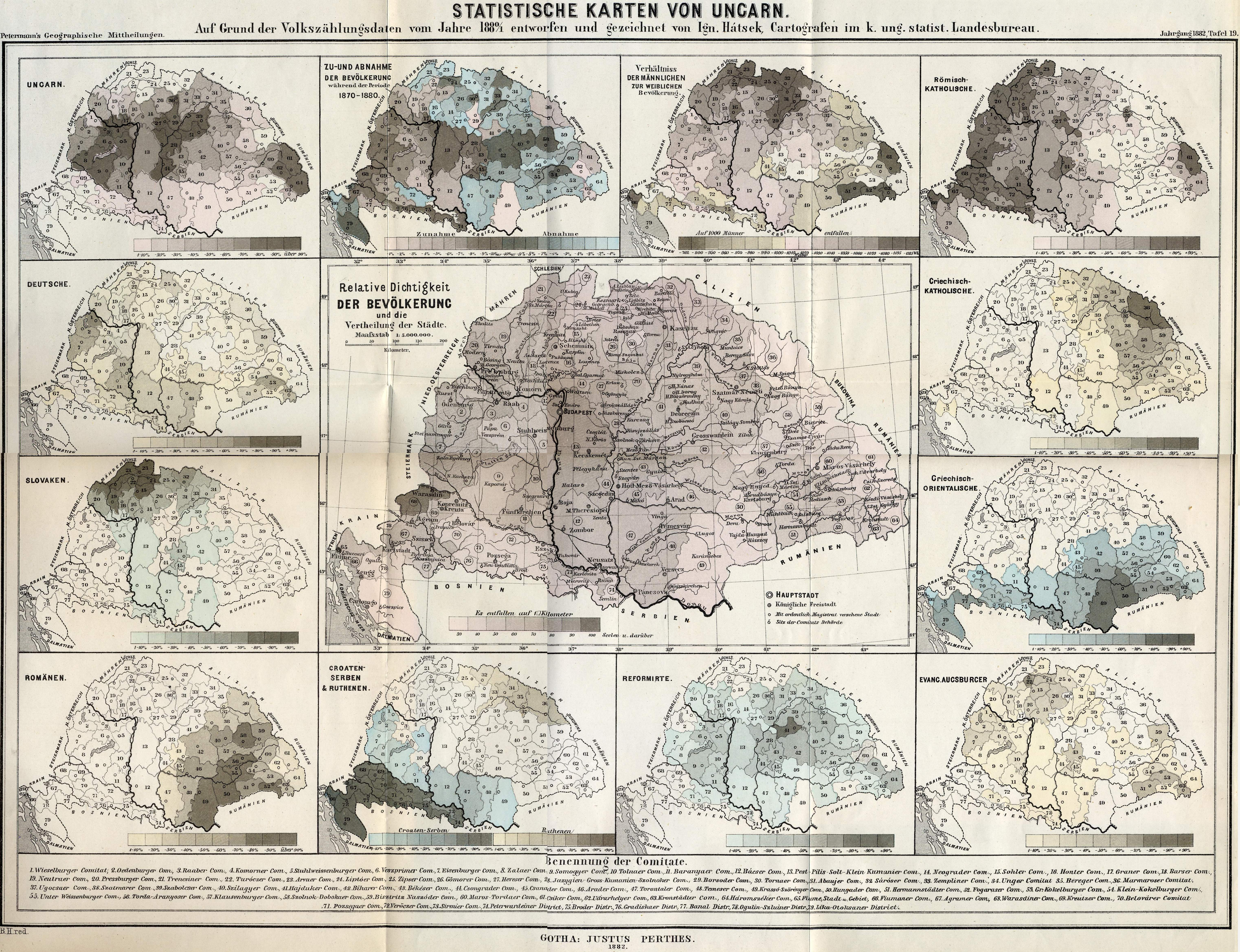
The population of Hungary according to the census of 1880-81

Franz Ferdinand had planned to redraw the map of Austria-Hungary radically, creating a number of ethnically and linguistically dominated semi-autonomous "states" which would all be part of a larger federation renamed the United States of Greater Austria. Under this plan, language and cultural identification was encouraged, and the imbalance of power would be corrected. The idea would have encountered heavy opposition from Hungarian politicians, since a direct result of the reform would have been a significant territorial loss for Hungary.

However, the Archduke was assassinated at Sarajevo in 1914, triggering the outbreak of the First World War. After the war, Austria-Hungary was dismantled and several new nation-states were created, and various Austro-Hungarian territories were ceded to neighbouring countries at the Paris Peace Conference (see Treaty of Saint-Germain-en-Laye and Treaty of Trianon).

== States proposed by Aurel Popovici ==
According to Popovici's plans, the following 15 territories were to become states of the federation after the reform. The majority ethnic group within each territory is also listed.

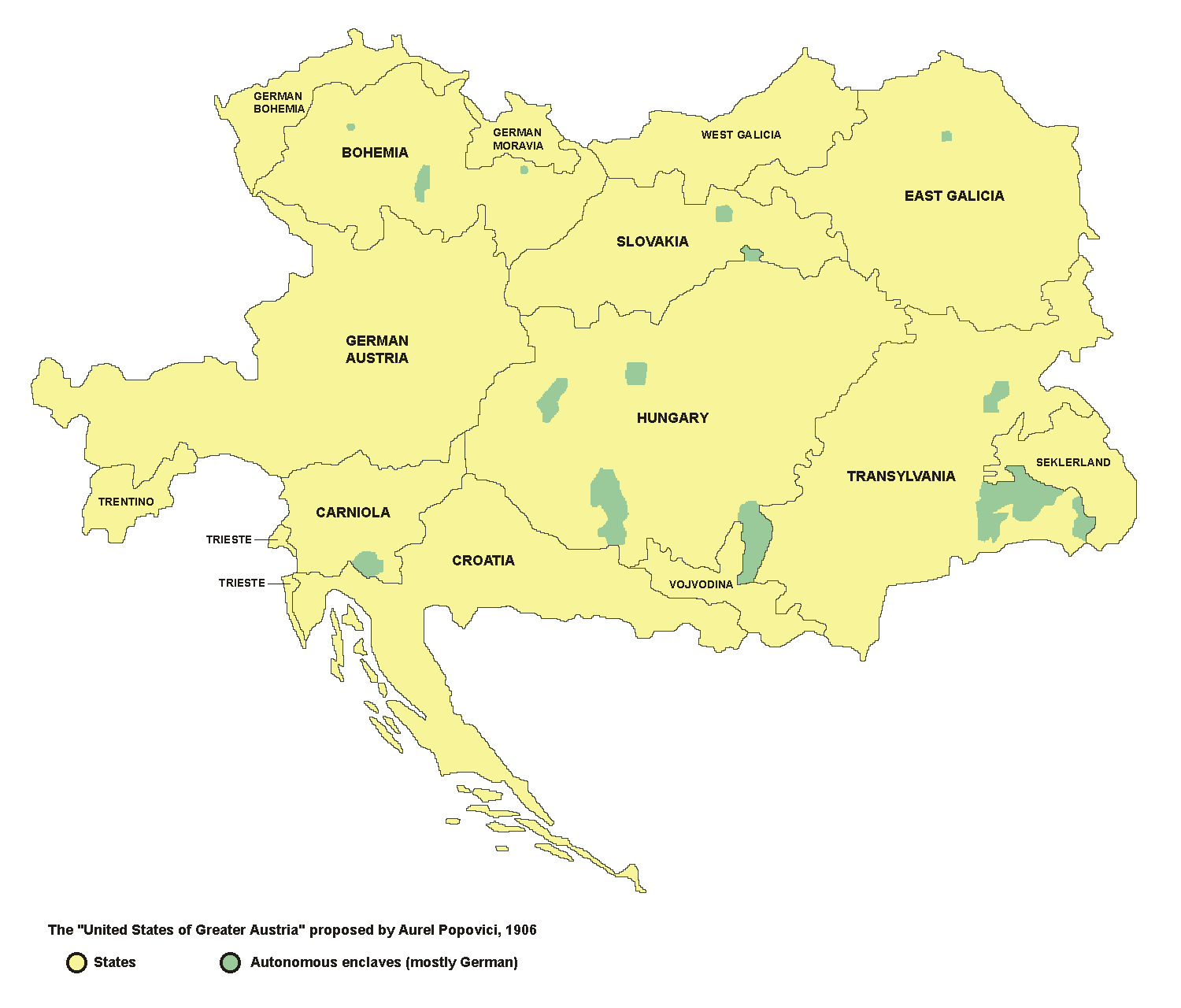
Proposed map of the United States of Greater Austria, by Popovici, 1906

- Deutsch-Österreich: German-Austria (present-day Austria with the Italian province of South Tyrol, the Bohemian Forest and South Moravia regions—the southern part of the later Sudetenland—in the present-day Czech Republic, as well as the Burgenland region in western Hungary including Sopron/Ödenburg and Mosonmagyaróvár/Wieselburg) and small area of current Slovakia around Bratislava/Pressburg, ethnic German
- Deutsch-Böhmen: German Bohemia (Sudetenland territory in northwestern Bohemia, present-day Czech Republic), ethnic German
- Deutsch-Mähren: German Moravia (northeastern Sudetenland in Moravia and Austrian Silesia, present-day Czech Republic, later named Province of the Sudetenland), ethnic German
- Böhmen: Bohemia proper (southern and central part of Bohemia and Moravia in the present-day Czech Republic), ethnic Czech
- Slowakenland: roughly present-day Slovakia without Hungarian minority lands in the south, ethnic Slovak
- West-Galizien: West Galicia (the western part of the Kingdom of Galicia and Lodomeria in present-day Poland), ethnic Polish
- Ost-Galizien: East Galicia (the eastern part of the Kingdom of Galicia and Lodomeria and the adjacent Bukovina lands, in present-day Ukraine and Poland), ethnic Rusyn and Ukrainian
- Ungarn: Hungary (present-day Hungary with parts of southern Slovakia, Transcarpathia - today Ukraine, and the northern Vojvodina region in present-day Serbia), ethnic Magyar
- Seklerland: Székely Land (part of present-day Romania), ethnic Magyar
- Siebenbürgen: Transylvania, most of the Banat and Bukovina (part of present-day Romania, Serbia and Ukraine), mainly ethnic Romanian, with Magyar and German minorities
- Trient: Trentino (part of present-day Italy), ethnic Italian
- Triest: Trieste and Gorizia (parts of present-day Italy), western Istria (part of present-day Croatia and Slovenia), mainly ethnic Italian, with Slovenian and Croatian minorities
- Krain: Carniola (roughly present-day Slovenia with the Slovene-speaking territory of southern Carinthia), ethnic Slovene
- Kroatien: Croatia (present-day Croatia, Srijem in present-day Serbia and Boka Kotorska in present-day Montenegro), ethnic Croatian, Italian and Serb
- Woiwodina: Vojvodina (part of present-day Serbia and Croatia), mainly Serb and Croatian, with Magyar, Romanian, German and Slovak minorities.

In addition, a number of mostly German-speaking enclaves in eastern Transylvania, the Banat and other parts of Hungary, southern Slovenia, large cities (such as Prague, Budapest, Lviv, and others) and elsewhere were to have autonomy within the respective territory.

"The great origin, language, customs and mentality diversity of different nationalities requires, for the whole Empire of the Habsburgs, a certain state form, which can guarantee that not a single nationality will be threatened, obstructed or offended in its national political life, in its private development, in its national pride, in one word – in its way of feeling and living"

— Aurel Popovici (1906)

== See also ==
- Trialism in Austria-Hungary, an alternative reform movement to turn the dual Austria-Hungary into a triple Austro-Hungarian-Croatian state
- National personal autonomy, an alternative reform suggested by Austrian Marxists
- Greater Austria proposal, earlier proposal uniting German and Austrian lands
- Treaty of Saint-Germain-en-Laye (1919)
- Treaty of Trianon
- Austro-Slavism
- Lajos Kossuth
- Count Karl Sigmund von Hohenwart
- Count Kasimir Felix Badeni
- Aurel Popovici
- Oszkár Jászi
- Milan Hodža
- Karl Renner
- Richard von Coudenhove-Kalergi
- Wolfgang Schüssel
- Koruna Česká (party)
- Black-Yellow Alliance
- Democratic Peasants' Party (Bukovina)
- Ethnic federalism
