= List of historical regions of Central Europe =

There are many historical regions of Central Europe. For the purpose of this list, Central Europe is defined as the area contained roughly within the south coast of the Baltic Sea, the Elbe River, the Alps, the Danube River, the Black Sea and the Dnieper River.

These historical regions were current in different time periods – from medieval to modern era – and may often overlap. National borders have been redrawn across those regions many times over the centuries, so usually a historical region cannot be assigned to any specific nation. The list below indicates which present-day states control the whole or a part of each of the listed regions.

== Belarus ==
- Black Ruthenia
- Polesia (divided between Belarus, Ukraine, Poland and Russia)
- Suwałki Region (mostly in Poland) (Note: Small part in the south-east with Sapotskin is located in Belarus.)
- Vilnius Region (part in Lithuania)
- White Ruthenia (part in Russia)

== Croatia ==
Croatia proper Dalmatia Istria Slavonia, Baranya (lighter shade)

- Baranya (mostly in Hungary)
- Croatia proper
  - Croatian Littoral
  - Croatian Highlands
  - Međimurje
  - Morlachia
- Dalmatia
- Istria
- Slavonia
- Syrmia (mostly in Serbia)

== Czech Republic ==
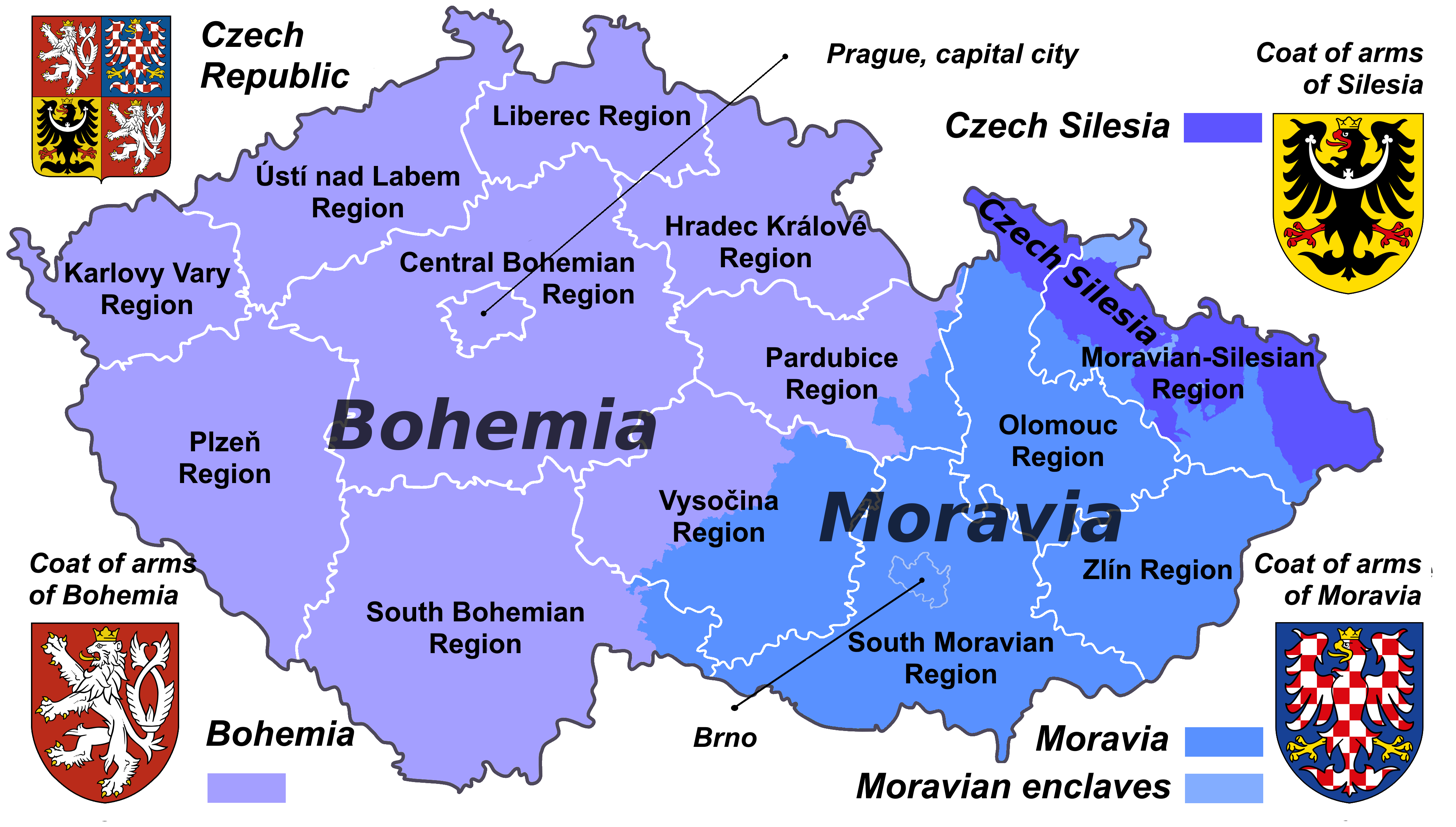
Historic regions of the Czech Republic

- Bohemia
  - Chebsko
- Czech Silesia (Czech part of the region of Silesia, mostly located in Poland with a small portion in Germany)
  - Cieszyn Silesia (part in Poland)
  - Hlučín Region
  - Opavian Silesia
- Moravia
  - Moravian Wallachia

Former historical regions of the Bohemian/Czech realm, excluding brief possessions:

- Bohemian Palatinate (Germany)
- Kłodzko Land (Poland)
- Lubusz Land (Poland) (Germany)
- Lusatia (Germany) (Poland)
- Old March (Germany)
- Vogtland (Germany)

== Germany ==
The list does not include the states of Germany and former countries with frequently changing borders, such as Bavaria and Saxony.

- Altmark
- Breisgau
- Franconia
- Frisia (part in the Netherlands)
- Hither Pomerania (small part in Poland)
- Holstein
- Lower Silesia (mostly in Poland, with another small part in the Czech Republic)
- Lubusz Land (part in Poland)
- Lusatia (part in Poland)
- Mecklenburg
- Meissenland
- Mittelmark
- Nassau
- Osterland
- Palatinate
  - Kurpfalz
- Pleissnerland
- Prignitz
- Rhineland
  - Rhenish Hesse
- Schleswig (part in Denmark)
- Swabia
  - Allgäu
- Thuringia
- Uckermark
- Vogtland (small part in the Czech Republic)
- Westphalia

== Hungary ==
- Bačka (mostly in Serbia)
- Banat (larger parts in Romania and Serbia)
- Baranya (small part in Croatia)
- Kunság (Cumania)
  - Greater Cumania
  - Little Cumania

Former historical regions of Hungary, excluding brief possessions:

- Lusatia (Germany) (Poland)
- Maramureș (Romania) (Ukraine)
- Moravia (Czech Republic)
- Red Ruthenia (Poland) (Ukraine)
- Silesia (Poland) (Czech Republic) (Germany)
- Syrmia (Serbia) (Croatia)
- Transylvania (Romania)
- Upper Hungary (Slovakia)

== Lithuania ==
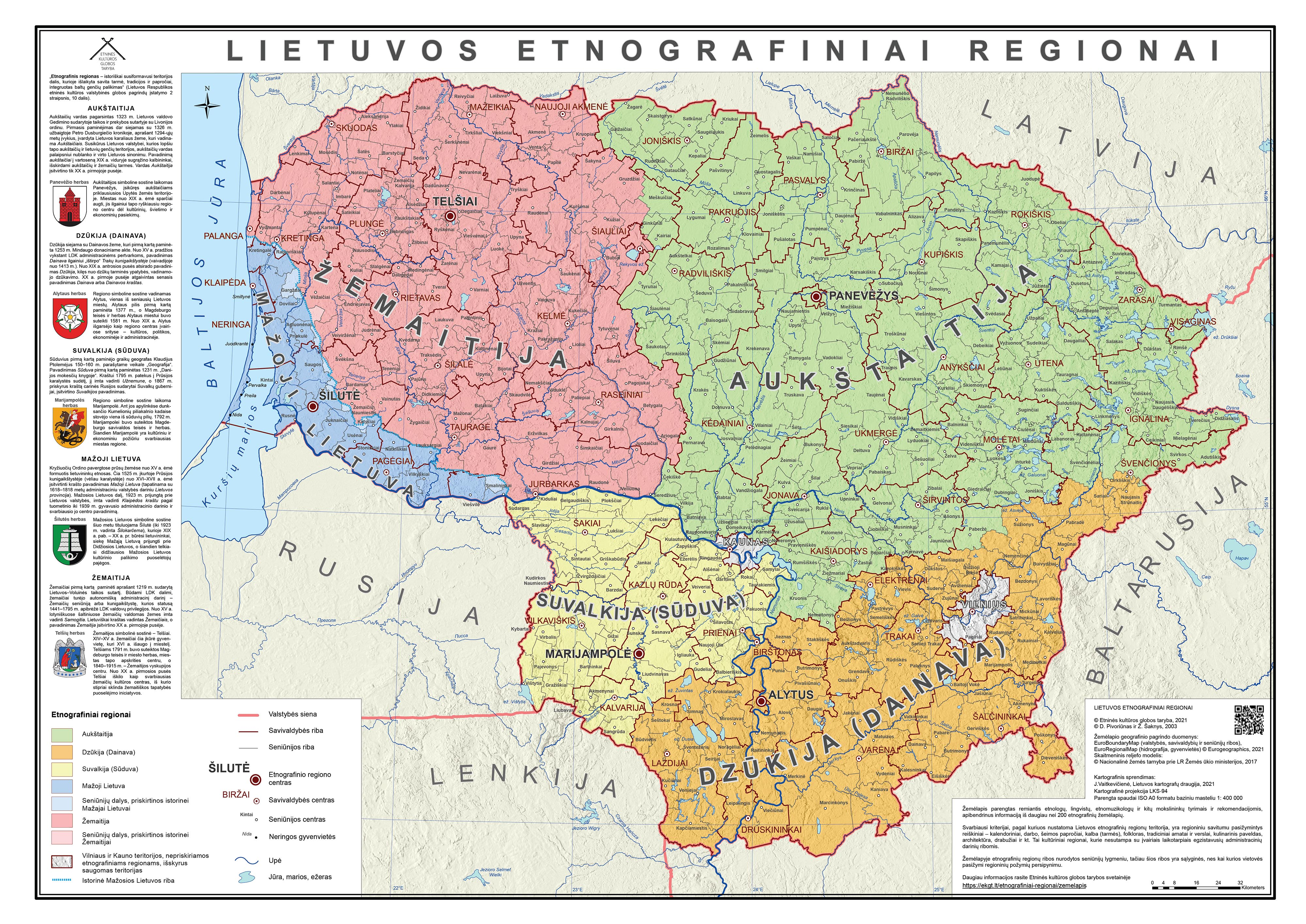
Regions of Lithuania

Main regions:

- Aukštaitija
- Dzūkija (part in Belarus)
- Lithuania Minor (mostly in Russia)
- Samogitia
- Sudovia

Former historical regions of Lithuania, excluding temporary possessions:

- Black Ruthenia (Belarus)
- Livonia (Latvia) (Estonia)
- Podolia (Ukraine) (Moldova)
- Polesia (Belarus) (Ukraine) (Russia)
- Suwałki Region (Poland) (Belarus)
- Ukraine
- Volhynia (Ukraine)
- White Ruthenia (Belarus) (Russia)
- Yedisan (Ukraine) (Moldova)

== Moldova ==
- Moldavia (divided between Romania, Moldova and Ukraine)
  - Bessarabia (small parts in Ukraine)
- Podolia (mostly in Ukraine)
- Yedisan (mostly in Ukraine)

== Poland ==
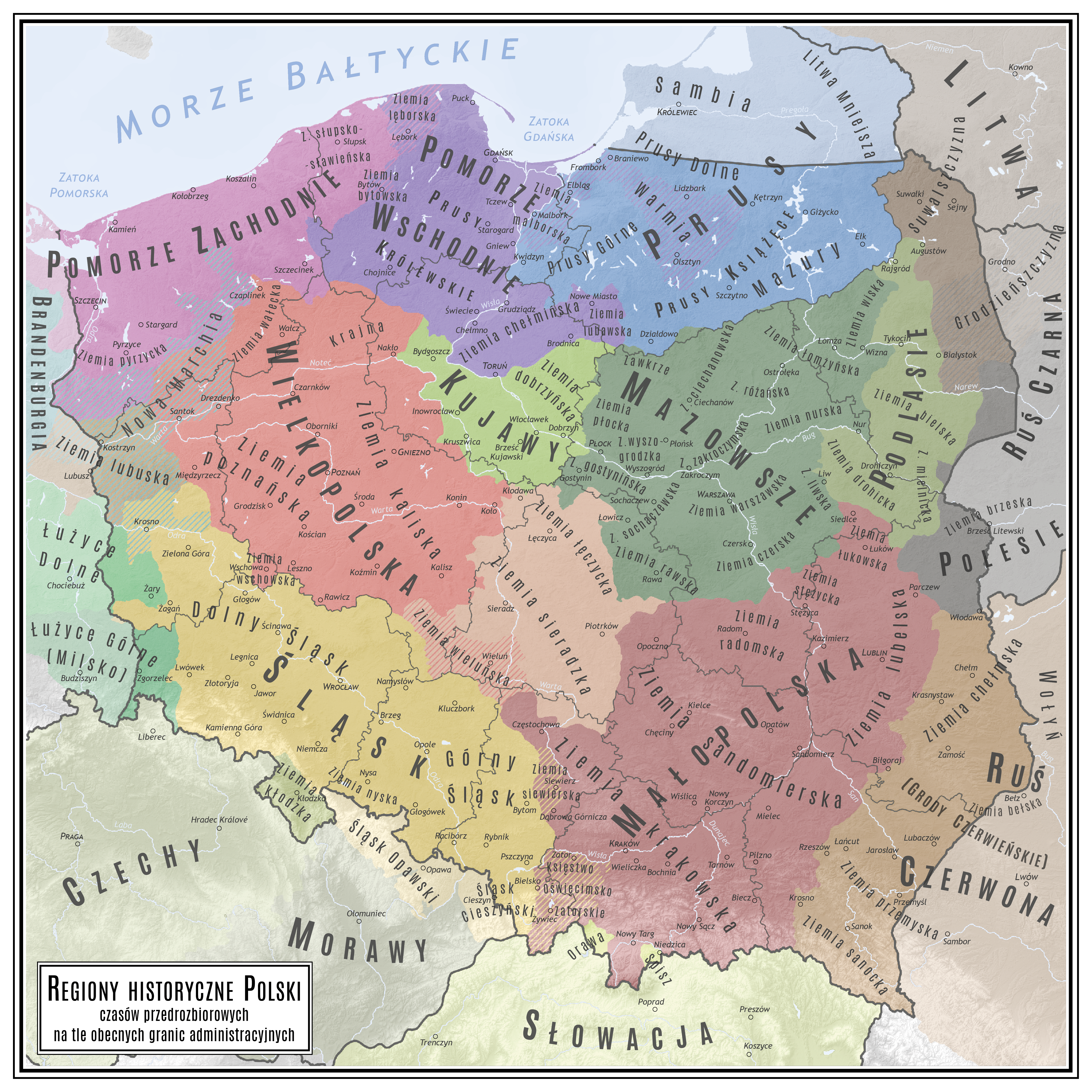
Map of Polish historical regions

Main regions:

- Greater Poland
- Kuyavia and Dobrzyń Land
- Łęczyca-Sieradz Land (Łęczyca Land + Sieradz Land + Wieluń Land)
- Masovia
- Lesser Poland
- Silesia (small parts in the Czech Republic and Germany)
- Pomerania (small part in Germany) and Pomerelia (small part in Russia) (Note: Small portion of the Vistula Spit with the former village of Polski is now located in the Kaliningrad Oblast of Russia.)

Smaller regions:

- Czerwień Cities (part in Ukraine)
- Kłodzko Land
- Lubusz Land (part in Germany)
- Lusatia (part in Germany)
- Masuria
- Natangia (mostly in Russia) (Note: Small part in the south with Górowo Iławeckie is located in Poland.)
- Podlachia
- Polesia (divided between Poland, Belarus, Ukraine and Russia)
- Powiśle
- Orawa (mostly in Slovakia)
- Spisz (mostly in Slovakia)
- Suwałki Region (small part in Belarus)
- Warmia

Former historical regions of Poland, excluding temporary possessions:

- Black Ruthenia (Belarus)
- Lithuania Minor (Russia)
- Lithuania proper (Belarus)
- Livonia (Latvia) (Estonia)
- Podolia (Ukraine) (Moldova)
- Pokuttia (Ukraine)
- Polesia (Belarus) (Ukraine) (Russia)
- Sambia (Russia)
- Samogitia (Lithuania)
- Ukraine
- Volhynia (Ukraine)
- White Ruthenia (Belarus) (Russia)

== Russia (Kaliningrad Oblast) ==
- Bartia (mostly in Poland)
- Gdańsk Pomerania (mostly in Poland)
- Lithuania Minor (small part in Lithuania)
- Natangia (small part in Poland)
- Sambia

== Slovenia ==
- Carniola
  - Inner Carniola
  - Lower Carniola
    - White Carniola
  - Upper Carniola
- Lower Styria (part of the region of Styria, mostly located in Austria)
- Prekmurje
- Slovene Carinthia (part of the region of Carinthia, mostly located in Austria)
- Slovene Littoral

== Western and Central Ukraine ==
- Galicia (part in Poland)
- Moldavia (mostly in Romania and Moldova)
  - Bessarabia (mostly in Moldova)
    - Budjak
  - Bukovina (part in Romania)
  - Hertsa
- Podolia (small part in Moldova)
- Polesia (parts in Belarus, Poland, and Russia)
- Right-bank Ukraine
- Red Ruthenia (part in Poland)
  - Pokuttia
- Transcarpathia
  - Maramureș (part in Romania)
- Volhynia
- Yedisan (small part in Moldova)

== Former Austro-Hungarian Empire ==
- Cisleithania
- Transleithania
- Bosnia and Herzegonvina:
  - Austro-Hungarian rule in Bosnia and Herzegovina
  - Regions of Bosnia and Herzegovina

=== The kingdoms and lands represented in the Austrian Imperial Council (Cisleithania) ===
- Archduchy of Austria
  - Upper Austria
    - Innviertel (Austria)
    - Hausruckviertel (Austria)
    - Mühlviertel (Austria)
    - Traunviertel (Austria)
  - Lower Austria
    - Weinviertel (Austria)
    - Waldviertel (Austria)
    - Mostviertel (Austria)
    - Industrieviertel (Austria)
- Czech Lands (Czech Republic)
  - Bohemia (Czech Republic)
    - German Bohemia (Czech Republic)
    - Bohemian Forest Region (Czech Republic)
  - Moravia (Czech Republic)
    - Moravian enclaves in Silesia (Czech Republic)
    - German South Moravia (Czech Republic)
  - Czech Silesia (Czech Republic)
    - Cieszyn Silesia (Czech Republic) (Poland)
    - Opavian Silesia (Czech Republic)
  - Sudetenland (Czech Republic)
    - Sudetenland Province (Czech Republic)
- Silesia (Poland) (Czech Republic) (Germany) (Slovakia)
  - Austrian Silesia (Czech Republic) (Poland)
    - Czech Silesia (Czech Republic)
      - Cieszyn Silesia (Czech Republic) (Poland)
      - Opavian Silesia (Czech Republic) (Poland)
      - Trans-Olza (Czech Republic)
  - Galician Silesia (Poland)
    - Duchy of Zator (Poland)
    - Duchy of Oświęcim (Poland)
    - Żywiecczyzna (Poland)
- Galicia (Poland) (Ukraine)
  - Eastern Galicia (Ukraine)
  - New Galicia (Poland)
  - Galician Silesia (Poland)
    - Duchy of Zator (Poland)
    - Duchy of Oświęcim (Poland)
    - Żywiecczyzna (Poland)
  - Kraków (Poland)
  - Lwów Land (Ukraine) (Poland)
- Bukovina (Romania) (Ukraine)
- Styria (Austria) (Slovenia)
  - Upper Styria (Austria)
  - Central Styria (Austria)
    - Western Styria (Austria)
    - Eastern Styria (Austria)
  - Lower Styria (Slovenia)
- Carinthia (Austria) (Slovenia) (Italy)
  - Austrian Carinthia (Austria)
  - Slovene Carinthia (Slovenia)
  - Carinthian Zones A & B (Austria)
  - Val Canale (Italy)
- Salzburg (Austria)
- Tyrol (Austria) (Italy)
  - North Tyrol (Austria)
  - East Tyrol (Austria)
  - South Tyrol (Italy)
  - Trentino (Italy)
  - Ladinia (Italy)
- Vorarlberg (Austria)
- Carniola (Slovenia)
  - Inner Carniola (Slovenia)
  - Lower Carniola (Slovenia)
    - White Carniola (Slovenia)
  - Upper Carniola (Slovenia)
  - Windic March (Slovenia)
  - Gottschee (Slovenia)

=== Lands of the Crown of Saint Stephen (Kingdom of Hungary or Transleithania) ===
- Bačka (Hungary)
- Banat
- Banovina (Croatia)
- Baranya (Hungary) (Croatia)
- Crişana (Transylvania)
- Dalmatia (Croatia)
- Délvidék (Hungary)
- Göcsej (Hungary)
- Great Hungarian Plain (Hungary)
- Hajdúság (Hungary)
- Hortobágy (Hungary)
- Istria (Croatia)
- Jászság (Hungary)
- Kiskunság (Hungary)
- Konavle (Croatia)
- Kordun (Croatia)
- Kunság (Hungary)
- Lika (Croatia)
- Međimurje (Croatia)
- Morlachia (Croatia)
- Nagykunság (Hungary)
- Pannonia
- Partium (Transylvania)
- Požega Valley (Croatia)
- Slavonia (Croatia)
- Syrmia (Croatia) (Serbia)
- Transdanubia (Hungary)
- Transylvania
- Upper Hungary

== Other regions ==
- Austria
  - Lower Austria
  - Upper Austria
- Austrian Littoral (Primorska) (Italy) (Slovenia) (Croatia)
- Bačka (Serbia) (Hungary)
- Banat (Romania) (Serbia) (Hungary)
- Burgenland (Austria)
- Carinthia (Austria) (Slovenia)
- Crișana (Romania) (Hungary)
- Dobruja (Romania) (Bulgaria)
  - Northern Dobruja (Romania)
  - Southern Dobruja (Bulgaria)
- East Elbia
- Illyria
- Istria (Croatia) (Slovenia)
- Northern Italy
  - Carnia (Italy)
  - Friuli (Italy)
  - Gorizia and Gradisca (Italy) (Slovenia)
  - Lombardy (Italy)
    - Insubria
    - Ticino
    - Valtellina
- Jazygia (Hungary)
- Maramureș (Romania) (Ukraine)
- Moldavia (Moldova) (Romania) (Ukraine)
  - Bessarabia (Moldova) (Ukraine)
    - Budjak (Ukraine)
  - Bukovina (Romania) (Ukraine)
  - Hertsa (Ukraine)
  - Western Moldavia (Romania)
- Orava (Slovakia) (Poland)
- Partium (Romania) (Hungary) (Ukraine) (Slovakia)
- Prussia (Poland) (Russia) (Lithuania)
- Romandy (Switzerland)
- Spiš (Slovakia) (Poland)
- Styria (Austria) (Slovenia)
  - Lower Styria (Slovenia)
  - Upper Styria (Austria)
- Transdanubia (Hungary)
  - Swabian Turkey (Hungary)
- Transylvania
  - Burzenland (Romania)
  - Northern Transylvania (Romania)
  - Nösnerland (Romania)
  - Székelyföld (Romania)
- Tyrol (Italy) (Austria)
  - North Tyrol (Austria)
  - East Tyrol (Austria)
  - South Tyrol (Italy)
  - Trentino (Italy)
- Vojvodina (Serbia)
- Wallachia (Romania)
  - Muntenia (Greater Wallachia) (Romania)
  - Oltenia (Lesser Wallachia) (Romania)
- White Croatia (Czech Republic) (Poland) (Slovakia)

== See also ==
- Contemporary related subdivisions
  - Austria
  - Belarus
  - Czech Republic
  - Germany
  - Poland
- Historical related regions
  - Croatia
  - Hungary
    - 1000–1920
    - 1941–1945
    - In Slovakia
  - Lithuania
  - Poland
  - Romania
  - Slovakia
  - Ukraine
