= Sudetenland =

Historical name for areas of Czechoslovakia

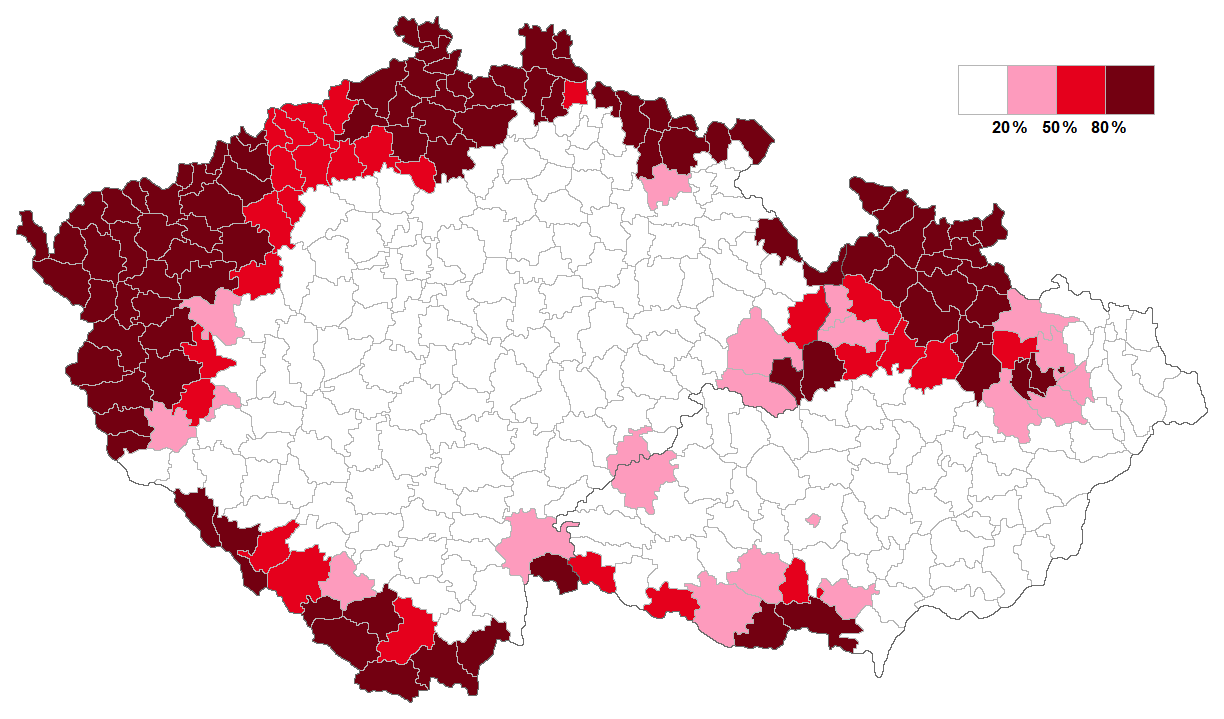
The native German-speaking regions in 1930, within the borders of the current Czech Republic, which in the interwar period were referred to as the Sudetenland. German population according to the 1930 census: 0–20% 20–50% 50–80% 80–100%

The Sudetenland (/suːˈdeɪtənlænd/ soo-DAY-tən-land, German: [zuˈdeːtn̩ˌlant]; Czech and Slovak: Sudety) is the historical German name for the northern, southern, and western areas of former Czechoslovakia which were inhabited primarily by Sudeten Germans. These German speakers had predominated in the border districts of Bohemia, Moravia, and Czech Silesia since the Middle Ages.

The word Sudetenland did not come into being until the early part of the 20th century and did not come to prominence until almost two decades into the century, after World War I, when Austria-Hungary disintegrated and the Sudeten Germans found themselves living in the new country of Czechoslovakia. The Sudeten crisis of 1938 was provoked by the Pan-Germanist demands of Nazi Germany that the Sudetenland be annexed to them, which happened after the later Munich Agreement. Part of the borderland was invaded and annexed by Poland. Afterwards, the formerly unrecognized Sudetenland became an administrative division of Germany. When Czechoslovakia was reconstituted after World War II, the Sudeten Germans were expelled and the region today is inhabited almost exclusively by Czech speakers.

The word Sudetenland is a German compound of Sudeten, the name of the Sudeten Mountains, which run along the northern Czech border and Lower Silesia (now in Poland), and Land, meaning "country". The Sudetenland encompassed areas well beyond those mountains, however.

Parts of the now-Czech regions of Karlovy Vary, Liberec, Olomouc, Moravia-Silesia, South Moravia and Ústí nad Labem are within the former Sudetenland.

== History ==
The areas later known as the Sudetenland never formed a single historical region, which makes it difficult to distinguish the history of the Sudetenland separately from that of Bohemia until the advent of nationalism in the 19th century.

=== Early origins ===
The Celtic Boii settled there and the region was first mentioned on the map of Ptolemaios in the 2nd century AD. The Germanic tribe of the Marcomanni dominated the entire core of the region in later centuries. Those tribes already built cities like Brno, but moved west during the Migration Period. In the 7th century AD Slavic people moved in and were united under Samo's realm. Later in the High Middle Ages Germans settled into the less populated border region.

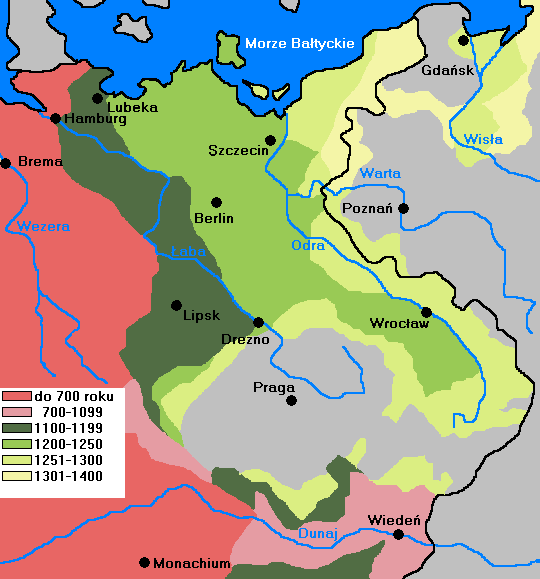
Stages of German eastern settlement, 700–1400

In the Middle Ages the regions situated on the mountainous border of the Duchy and the Kingdom of Bohemia (Crown of Saint Václav) had since the Migration Period been settled mainly by western Slavic Czechs. Along the Bohemian Forest in the west, the Czech lands bordered on the German Slavic tribes (German Sorbs) stem duchies of Bavaria and Franconia; marches of the medieval German kingdom had also been established in the adjacent Austrian lands south of the Bohemian-Moravian Highlands and the northern Meissen region beyond the Ore Mountains. In the course of the Ostsiedlung (settlement of the east), German settlement from the 13th century onwards continued to move into the Upper Lusatia region and the duchies of Silesia north of the Sudetes mountain range.

From as early as the second half of the 13th century onwards these Bohemian border regions were settled by ethnic Germans, who were invited by the Přemyslid Bohemian kings—especially by Ottokar II (1253–1278) and Wenceslaus II (1278–1305). After the extinction of the Přemyslid dynasty in 1306, the Bohemian nobility backed John of Luxembourg as king against his rival Duke Henry of Carinthia. In 1322, King John of Bohemia acquired (for the third time) the formerly Imperial Egerland region in the west and vassalized most of the Piast Silesian duchies, as acknowledged by King Casimir III of Poland by the 1335 Treaty of Trentschin. His son, Bohemian King Charles IV, was elected King of the Romans in 1346 and crowned Holy Roman Emperor in 1355. He added the Lusatias to the Lands of the Bohemian Crown, which then comprised large territories with a significant German population.

In the hilly border regions German settlers established major manufactures of forest glass. The situation of the German population was aggravated by the Hussite Wars (1419–1434), though there were also some Germans among the Hussite insurgents. Despite the hardships of the Hussite Wars, the German population remained dominant in the border regions.

By then Germans largely settled the hilly Bohemian border regions as well as the cities of the lowlands; mainly people of Bavarian descent in the South Bohemian and South Moravian Region, in Brno, Jihlava, České Budějovice and the West Bohemian Plzeň Region; Franconian people in Žatec; Upper Saxons in adjacent North Bohemia, where the border with the Saxon Electorate was fixed by the 1459 Peace of Eger; Germanic Silesians in the adjacent Sudetes region with the County of Kladsko, in the Moravian–Silesian Region, in Svitavy and Olomouc. The city of Prague had a German-speaking majority from the last third of the 17th century until 1860, but after 1910 the proportion of German speakers had decreased to 6.7% of the population.

From the Luxembourgs, rule over Bohemia passed through George of Podiebrad to the Jagiellon dynasty and finally to the House of Habsburg in 1526. Both Czech and German Bohemians suffered heavily in the Thirty Years' War. Bohemia lost 70% of its population. From the defeat of the Bohemian Revolt that collapsed at the 1620 Battle of White Mountain, the Habsburgs gradually integrated the Kingdom of Bohemia into their monarchy. During the subsequent Counter-Reformation, less populated areas were resettled with Catholic Germans from the Austrian lands. From 1627, the Habsburgs enforced the so-called Verneuerte Landesordnung ("Renewed Land's Constitution"), and one of its consequences was that German, according to mother tongue, gradually became the primary and official language, while Czech declined to a secondary role in the Empire. In 1749, the Austrian Empire enforced German as the official language again. Emperor Joseph II in 1780 renounced the coronation ceremony as Bohemian king and unsuccessfully tried to push German through as sole official language in all Habsburg lands (including Hungary). Nevertheless, German cultural influence grew stronger during the Age of Enlightenment and Weimar Classicism.

Contrastingly, in the course of the Romanticism movement national tensions arose, both in the form of the Austroslavism ideology developed by Czech politicians like František Palacký and Pan-Germanist activist raising the German question. Conflicts between Czech and German nationalists emerged in the 19th century, for instance in the Revolutions of 1848: while the German-speaking population of Bohemia and Moravia wanted to participate in the building of a German nation state, the Czech-speaking population insisted on keeping Bohemia out of such plans. The Bohemian Kingdom remained a part of the Austrian Empire and Austria-Hungary until its dismemberment after the World War I.

=== Emergence of the term ===
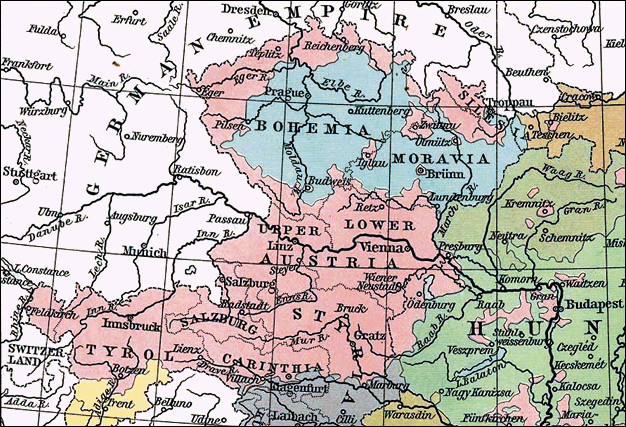
Ethnic distribution in Austria-Hungary in 1911: regions with a German majority are depicted in pink, those with Czech majorities in blue.

The term "Sudetenland" can already be found in geographical literature as early as 1866. In the 19th century, however, the term referred only to the mountain range from the Zittau Basin to the Moravian Gate. In 1902, the publicist and politician Franz Jesser used the term for the first time as a pars pro toto, applying "Sudetenland" to all areas of Bohemia, Moravia, and Austrian Silesia that were then inhabited by a majority of German speakers. Initially, the reception of this newly coined term was slow. In the 1920s, after the territories had become part of Czechoslovakia, publishers, journals, book series, as well as political, popular science, and regional-cultural publications began to adopt it. It eventually also came into circulation as a designation in historical and ethnographic periodicals and monographs. The popularity of the term continued to rise in the 1930, especially after the founding of the Sudetendeutsche Heimatfront in 1933 and later the Sudeten German Party in 1935.

In the wake of growing nationalism, the name "Sudetendeutsche" (Sudeten Germans) emerged by the early 20th century. It originally constituted part of a larger classification of three groupings of Germans within the Austro-Hungarian Empire, which also included "Alpine Deutschen" (Alpine Germans) in what later became the Republic of Austria and "Balkandeutsche" (Balkan Germans) in Hungary and the regions east of it. Of these three terms, only the term "Sudetendeutsche" survived, because of the ethnic and cultural conflicts within Bohemia.

=== World War I and aftermath ===
During World War I, what later became known as the Sudetenland experienced a rate of war deaths that was higher than most other German-speaking areas of Austria-Hungary and exceeded only by German South Moravia and Carinthia. Thirty-four of each 1,000 inhabitants were killed.

Austria-Hungary broke apart at the end of World War I. In late October 1918, an independent Czechoslovak state, consisting of the lands of the Bohemian kingdom and areas belonging to the Kingdom of Hungary, was proclaimed. The German deputies of Bohemia, Moravia, and Silesia in the Imperial Council (Reichsrat) referred to the Fourteen Points of US President Woodrow Wilson and the right proposed therein to self-determination and attempted to negotiate the union of the German-speaking territories with the new Republic of German Austria, which itself aimed at joining Weimar Germany.

The German-speaking parts of the former Lands of the Bohemian Crown were to be part of a newly created Czechoslovakia, a multi-ethnic state of several nations: Czechs, Germans, Slovaks, Hungarians, Poles and Ruthenians. On 20 September 1918, the Prague government asked for the opinion of the United States on the Sudetenland. Wilson sent Ambassador Archibald Coolidge into Czechoslovakia. Coolidge insisted on respecting the Germans' right to self-determination and uniting all German-speaking areas with either Germany or Austria, with the exception of northern Bohemia. However, the American delegation at the Paris talks decided not to follow Coolidge's proposal. Allen Dulles was the American's chief diplomat in the Czechoslovak Commission and emphasized preserving the unity of the Czech lands.

Four regional governmental units were established:

- Province of German Bohemia (Provinz Deutschböhmen), the regions of northern and western Bohemia; proclaimed a constitutive state (Land) of the German-Austrian Republic with Reichenberg (Liberec) as capital, administered by a Landeshauptmann (state captain), consecutively: Rafael Pacher (1857–1936), 29 October – 6 November 1918, and Rudolf Ritter von Lodgman von Auen (1877–1962), 6 November – 16 December 1918 (the last principal city was conquered by the Czech army but he continued in exile, first at Zittau in Saxony and then in Vienna, until 24 September 1919).
- Province of the Sudetenland (Provinz Sudetenland), the regions of northern Moravia and Austrian Silesia; proclaimed a constituent state of the German-Austrian Republic with Troppau (Opava) as capital, governed by a Landeshauptmann: Robert Freissler (1877–1950), 30 October – 18 December 1918. This province's boundaries do not correspond to what would later be called the Sudetenland, which contained all the German-speaking parts of the Czech lands.
- Bohemian Forest Region (Böhmerwaldgau), the region of Bohemian Forest/South Bohemia; proclaimed a district (Kreis) of the existing Austrian Land of Upper Austria; administered by Kreishauptmann (district captain): Friedrich Wichtl (1872–1922) from 30 October 1918.
- German South Moravia (Deutschsüdmähren), proclaimed a District (Kreis) of the existing Austrian land Lower Austria, administered by a Kreishauptmann: Oskar Teufel (1880–1946) from 30 October 1918.

The U.S. commission to the Paris Peace Conference issued a declaration, which gave unanimous support for "unity of Czech lands". In particular the declaration stated:

The Commission was... unanimous in its recommendation that the separation of all areas inhabited by the German-Bohemians would not only expose Czechoslovakia to great dangers but equally create great difficulties for the Germans themselves. The only practicable solution was to incorporate these Germans into Czechoslovakia.

Several German minorities according to their mother tongue in Moravia, including German-speaking populations in Brno, Jihlava and Olomouc, also attempted to proclaim their union with German Austria.

In sum, the Czechs rejected the aspirations of the German Bohemians and demanded the inclusion of the lands inhabited by ethnic Germans in their state, on the grounds that they had always been part of the lands of the Bohemian Crown. These lands were in some instances more than 90% (as of 1921) ethnically German, which made the whole of Czechoslovakia 23.4% German.

The Treaty of Saint-Germain in 1919 affirmed the inclusion of the German-speaking territories within Czechoslovakia. Over the next two decades, some Germans in the Sudetenland continued to strive for a separation of the regions from Czechoslovakia.

According to Elizabeth Wiskemann, despite the initial resistance to the Czechoslovak rule, the Sudeten German population was not entirely opposed to annexation by Czechoslovakia. Sudeten economy and industry relied on the rest of Bohemia, and local industrialists were afraid of "Reich German competition and therefore of the talk of handing them over". Many Sudeten Germans also opposed joining Austria, arguing that being incorporated into Austria would turn Sudeten lands into "economically helpless Austrian enclaves". Because of this, Sudetenland becoming part of Czechoslovakia was the preferable choice of "a good deal of cautious middle-class" amongst Sudeten Germans. Silesian-Sudeten Germans were particularly pro-Czechoslovak, as they strongly preferred Czechoslovak rule to the prospect of becoming a part of Poland.

=== Within the Czechoslovak Republic (1918–1938) ===
Flag flown by Sudeten Germans

According to the February 1921 census, 3,123,000 native German speakers lived in Czechoslovakia, 23.4% of the total population. The controversies between the Czechs and the German-speaking minority lingered on throughout the 1920s and intensified in the 1930s.

During the Great Depression, the mostly-mountainous regions populated by the German minority, together with other peripheral regions of Czechoslovakia, were hurt by the economic depression more than the interior of the country was. Unlike the less developed regions (Carpathian Ruthenia, Moravian Wallachia), the Sudetenland had a high concentration of vulnerable export-dependent industries (such as glass works, textile industry, paper-making and toy-making industry). Sixty percent of the bijouterie and glassmaking industry were located in the Sudetenland, and 69% of employees in the sector were German-speaking according to mother tongue, and 95% of bijouterie and 78% of other glassware was produced for export. The glass-making sector was affected by decreased spending power and by protective measures in other countries, and many German workers lost their work.

The high unemployment, as well as the imposition of Czech in schools and all public spaces, made people more open to populist and extremist movements such as fascism, communism and German irredentism. In those years, parties of German nationalists and later the Sudeten German Party (SdP), with its radical demands gained immense popularity, among Germans in Czechoslovakia.

=== Sudeten Crisis ===
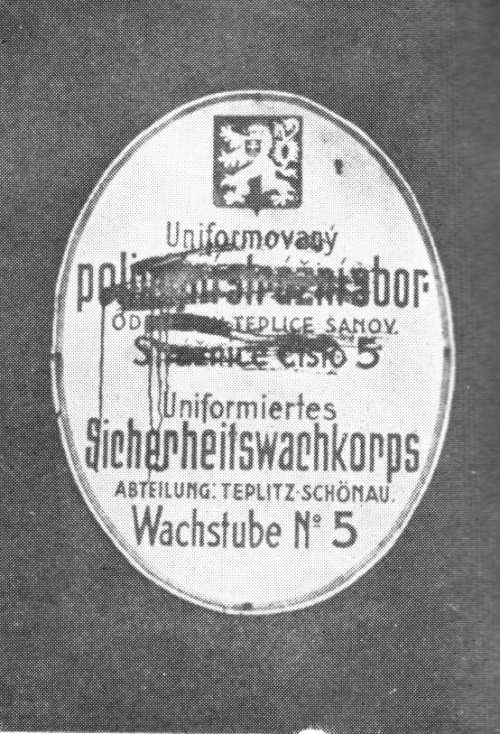
Czech inscriptions smeared by Sudeten German activists, March 1938, Teplice

The increasing aggressiveness of Hitler prompted the Czechoslovak military to start to build extensive border fortifications in 1936 to defend the troubled border region. Immediately after the Anschluss of Austria into the German Reich in March 1938, Hitler made himself the advocate of ethnic Germans living in Czechoslovakia, which triggered the Sudeten Crisis. The following month, Sudeten Nazis, led by Konrad Henlein, agitated for autonomy. On 24 April 1938, the SdP proclaimed the Karlsbader Programm, which demanded in eight points the complete equality between the Sudeten Germans and the Czech people. The government accepted those claims on 30 June 1938.

In August, British Prime Minister Neville Chamberlain sent Lord Runciman on a mission to Czechoslovakia to see if he could obtain a settlement between the Czechoslovak government and the Germans in the Sudetenland. Runciman's first day included meetings with President Beneš and Prime Minister Milan Hodža as well as a direct meeting with the Sudeten Germans from Henlein's SdP. On the next day, he met with Dr and Mme Beneš and later met non-Nazi Germans in his hotel.

A full account of his report, including summaries of the conclusions of his meetings with the various parties, which he made in person to the Cabinet on his return to the United Kingdom, is found in the Document CC 39(38). Lord Runciman (Note: Note that what he reportsled is an expression of his opinion on the situation. He may have been entirely mistaken on that, but it helps to understand how he saw the situation. For example, he felt that the Czechoslovak government was blind to the situation, but that does not make it true.) expressed sadness that he could not bring about agreement with the various parties, but he agreed with Lord Halifax that the time that had been gained was important. He reported on the situation of the Sudeten Germans and gave details of four plans that had been proposed to deal with the crisis, each of which had points that, he reported, made it unacceptable to the other parties to the negotiations.

The four plans included, first, the transfer of the Sudetenland to the Reich, second, holding a plebiscite on the transfer of the Sudetenland to the Reich, third, organising a Four-Power Conference on the matter and, fourth, creating a federal Czechoslovakia. At the meeting, he said that he was very reluctant to offer his own solution and had not seen that as his task. The most that Halifax said was that the great centres of opposition were in Eger and Asch, in the northwestern corner of Bohemia, where about 800,000 Germans and very few others lived.

Halifax said that the transfer of these areas to Germany would almost certainly be a good thing adding that the Czechoslovak army would certainly oppose that very strongly and that Beneš had said that it would fight, rather than accept it.

British Prime Minister Neville Chamberlain met Adolf Hitler in Berchtesgaden on 15 September and agreed to the cession of the Sudetenland. Three days later, French Prime Minister Édouard Daladier did the same. No Czechoslovak representative was invited to the discussions. Germany was now able to walk into the Sudetenland without firing a shot.

Chamberlain met Hitler in Godesberg on 22 September 1938 to confirm the agreements. Hitler, aiming to use the crisis as a pretext for war, now demanded not only the annexation of the Sudetenland but also the immediate military occupation of Bohemia, Moravia and Slovakia, thus giving the Czechoslovak army no time to adapt its defence measures to the new borders.

Hitler, in a speech at the Sportpalast in Berlin, claimed that the Sudetenland was "the last territorial demand I have to make in Europe" and gave Czechoslovakia a deadline of 28 September 1938 at 2:00 p.m. to cede the Sudetenland to Germany or face war.

To achieve a solution, the Italian dictator, Benito Mussolini, suggested a conference of the major powers in Munich, and on 29 September, Hitler, Daladier and Chamberlain met and agreed to Mussolini's proposal (actually prepared by Hermann Göring) and signed the Munich Agreement. They accepted the immediate occupation of the Sudetenland. The Czechoslovak government, though not party to the talks, submitted to compulsion and promised to abide by the agreement on 30 September.

The Sudetenland was assigned to Germany between 1 and 10 October 1938. The Czech part of Czechoslovakia was subsequently invaded by Germany in March 1939, with a portion being annexed and the remainder turned into the Protectorate of Bohemia and Moravia. The Slovak part declared its independence from Czechoslovakia and became the Slovak Republic (Slovak State), a satellite state allied to Germany (the Ruthenian part, Subcarpathian Rus, also made an attempt to declare its sovereignty as Carpatho-Ukraine, albeit only with ephemeral success since the area was soon annexed by Hungary).

Although "Henlein and the SdP had become accessories in Hitler's escalating campaign to annex the Sudetenland to the German Reich" by the summer of 1938, the supporters of the SdP supported autonomy within Czechoslovakia rather than annexation into Germany. Contemporary reports of The Times found that there was a "large number of Sudetenlanders who actively opposed annexation", and that the pro-German policy was challenged by the moderates within the SdP as well; according to Wickham Steed, over 50% of Henlein's supporters favoured greater autonomy within Czechoslovakia rather than joining Germany. Sudeten German historian Emil Franzel argues that the mainstream wing of Henlein's party was "not striving for annexation to Germany, but for genuine autonomy", and the majority of negotiators who conducted talks with Hodža and Beneš belonged to the pro-autonomy wing and were unaware of Henlein's agreements with Hitler.

Part of the borderland had an ethnic Polish majority and was invaded and annexed by Poland in 1938.

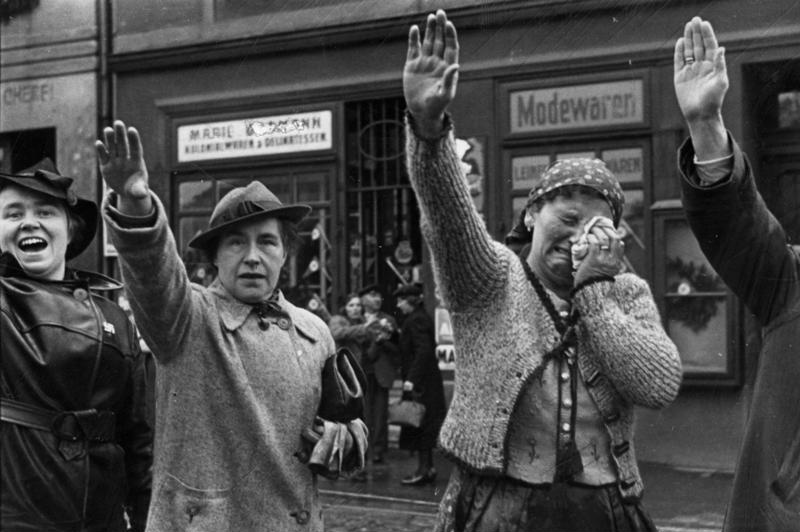
Ethnic Germans in the city of Eger (now Cheb) greeting Hitler with the Nazi salute after he crossed the border into the Czechoslovak Sudetenland on 3 October 1938

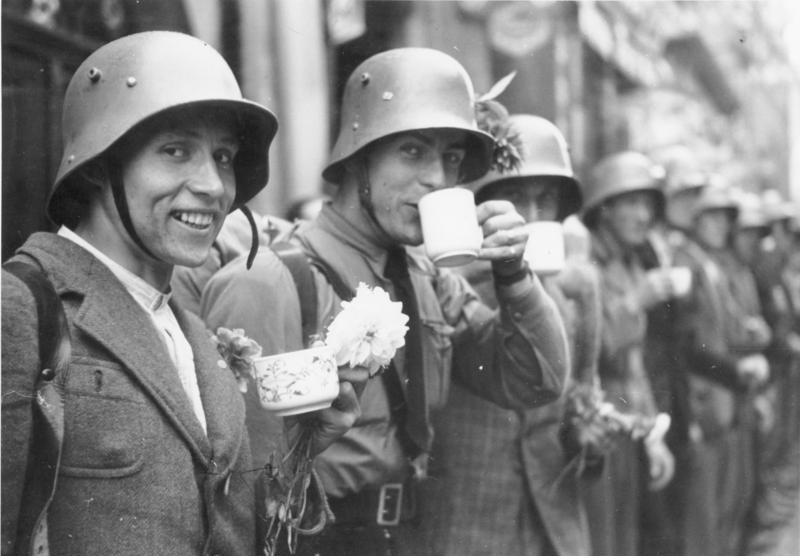
Volunteers of the Sudeten German Free Corps (German: Sudetendeutsches Freikorps) receiving refreshments from the local population in the city of Eger/Cheb)

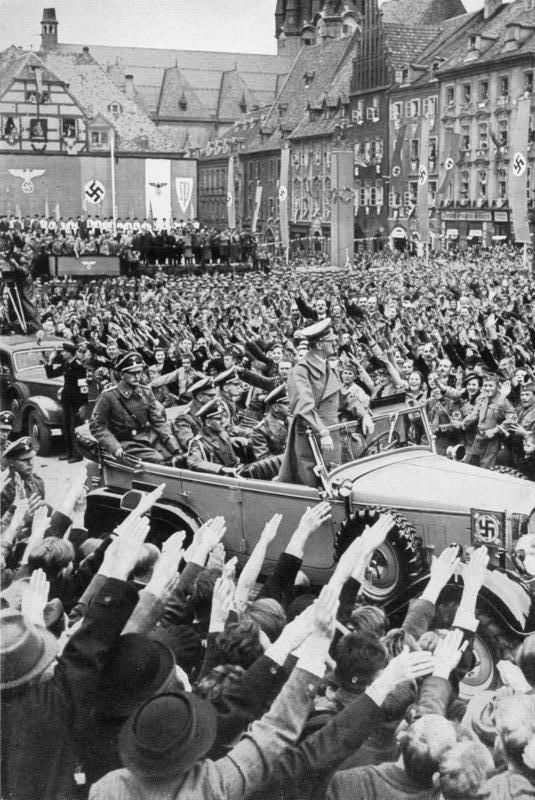
Adolf Hitler drives through the crowd in Eger/Cheb on 3 October 1938

=== Sudetenland as part of Germany ===
The Sudetenland was initially put under military administration, with General Wilhelm Keitel as military governor. On 14 April 1939, the annexed territories were divided, with the southern parts being incorporated into the neighbouring Reichsgaue of Niederdonau, Oberdonau and Bayerische Ostmark.

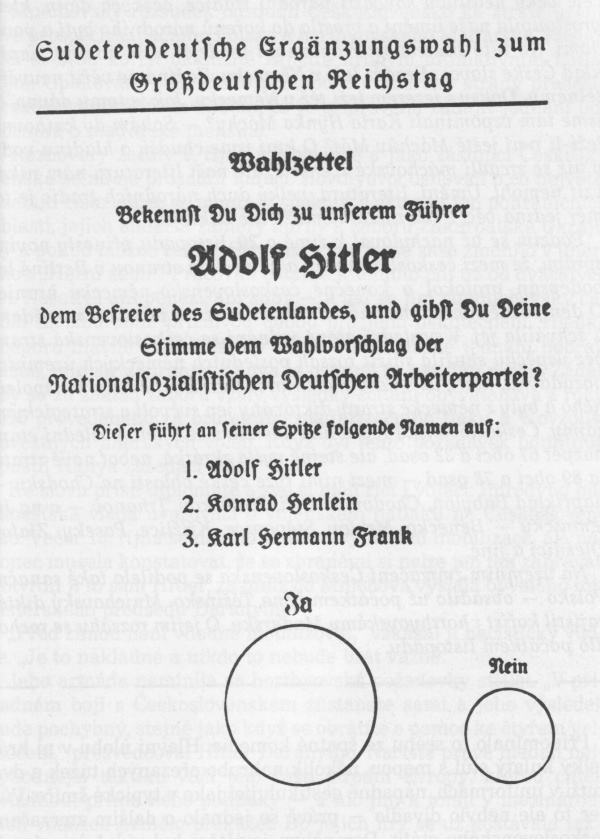
Election ballot, Reichsgau Sudetenland, December 1938

The northern and the western parts were reorganised as the Reichsgau Sudetenland, with the city of Reichenberg (present-day Liberec) established as its capital. Konrad Henlein (now openly an NSDAP member) administered the district first as Reichskommissar (until 1 May 1939) and then as Reichsstatthalter (1 May 1939 – 4 May 1945). The Sudetenland consisted of three administrative districts (Regierungsbezirke): Eger (with Karlsbad as capital), Aussig (Aussig) and Troppau (Troppau).

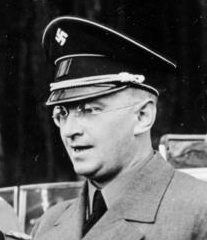
Sudetenland was administered by Konrad Henlein for the duration of the war.

Before the occupation, Jews in the area had become targeted during the Holocaust in the Sudetenland. Only a few weeks later, the Kristallnacht occurred. As elsewhere in Germany, many synagogues were set on fire and numerous leading Jews were sent to concentration camps. Jews and Czechs were not the only afflicted peoples since German socialists, communists and pacifists were widely persecuted as well. Some of the German socialists fled the Sudetenland via Prague and London to other countries. The Gleichschaltung would permanently alter the community in the Sudetenland.

However, on 4 December 1938, there were elections in Reichsgau Sudetenland in which 97.32% of the adult population voted for the NSDAP. About a half million Sudeten Germans joined the Nazi Party, 17.34% of the total German population in the Sudetenland (the average NSDAP membership participation in Germany was merely 7.85% in 1944). That means the Sudetenland was one of the most pro-Nazi regions of Nazi Germany. Because of their knowledge of the Czech language, many Sudeten Germans were employed in the administration of the ethnic Czech Protectorate of Bohemia and Moravia as well as in Nazi organizations (Gestapo etc.). The most notable one was Karl Hermann Frank, the SS and police general and Secretary of State in the Protectorate.

Nazi Germany occupied Sudetenland from 1938 to 1945. The annexation was supported by many Bohemian and Moravian Germans. The new Sudetengau was treated as an "endangered borderland." Using the same borderland funding that Saxony and Bavaria had received since 1931, the German government flooded northern Bohemia with funds to boost social welfare aid and to reduce unemployment. However, Bohemian Germans soon complained that the German occupation had also brought inflation, a declining standard of living, and a new form of outside rule, as Altreich bureaucrats filled business and government positions in the Sudetengau.

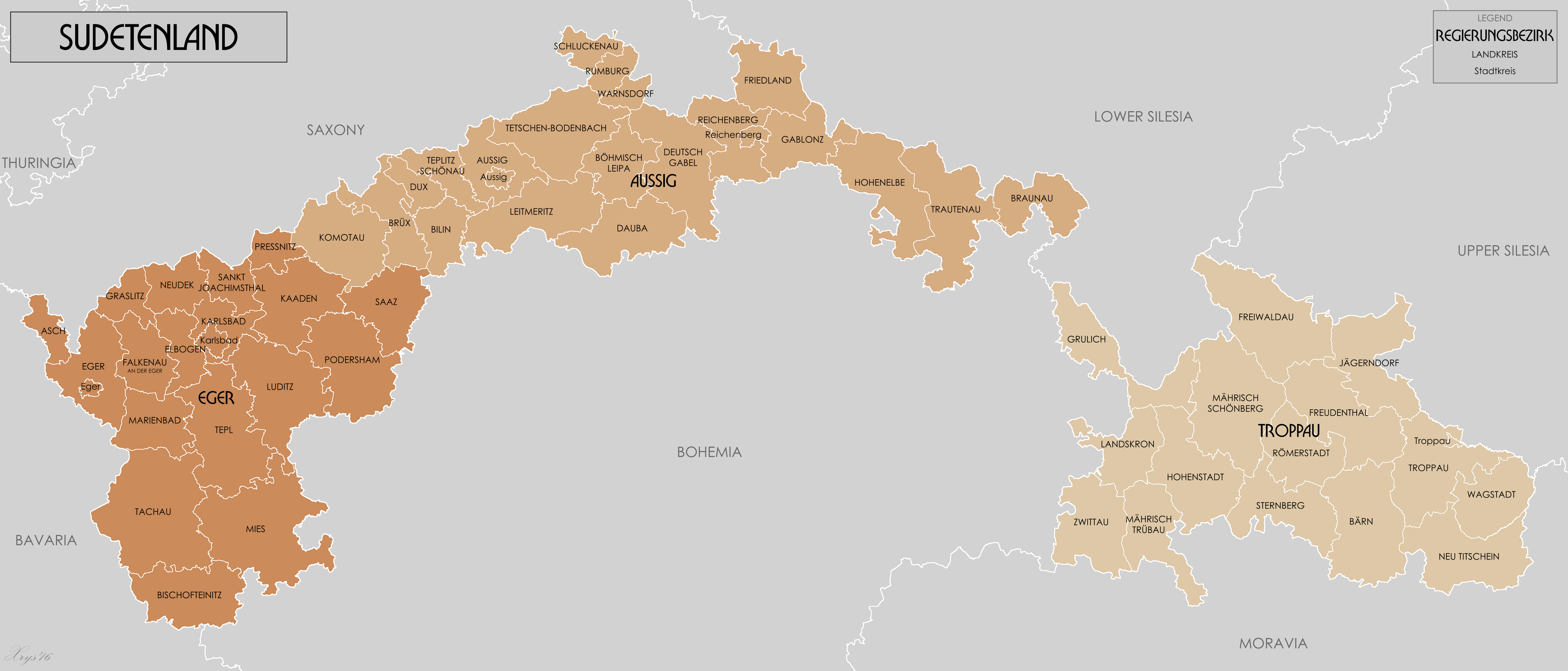
Administrative Divisions of Reichsgau Sudetenland

=== Expulsions and resettlement after World War II ===
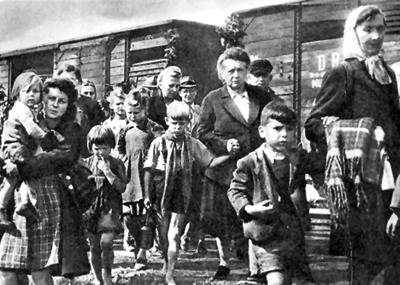
The expulsion of Germans from Czechoslovakia as the result of the end of World War II

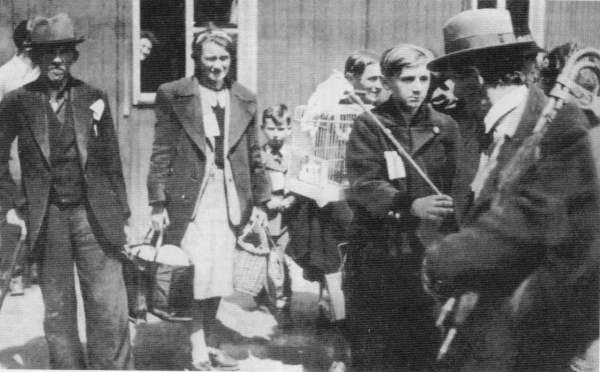
From the territory occupied by the Third Reich, 160,000 to 170,000 Czech-speaking inhabitants were forced to leave or were expelled

Shortly after the liberation of Czechoslovakia in May 1945, the use of the term Sudety (Sudetenland) in official communications was banned and replaced by the term pohraniční území (border territory). The Berlin Declaration of 5 June 1945 legally ended th German annexation of the Sudetenland.

In the summer of 1945, the Potsdam Conference decided that Sudeten Germans would have to leave Czechoslovakia. As a consequence of the immense hostility against all Germans that had grown within Czechoslovakia because many of them had helped the Nazis, the overwhelming majority of Germans were expelled though the relevant Czechoslovak legislation had provided for Germans to remain if they could prove their anti-Nazi affiliation.

The number of expelled Germans in the early phase (spring–summer 1945) is estimated to be around 500,000 people. After the Beneš decrees, nearly all Germans were expelled starting in 1946 and in 1950 only 159,938 (from 3,149,820 in 1930) still lived in the Czech Republic. The remaining Germans, who were proven antifascists and skilled laborers, were allowed to stay in Czechoslovakia but were later forcefully dispersed within the country. Some German refugees from Czechoslovakia are represented by the Sudetendeutsche Landsmannschaft.

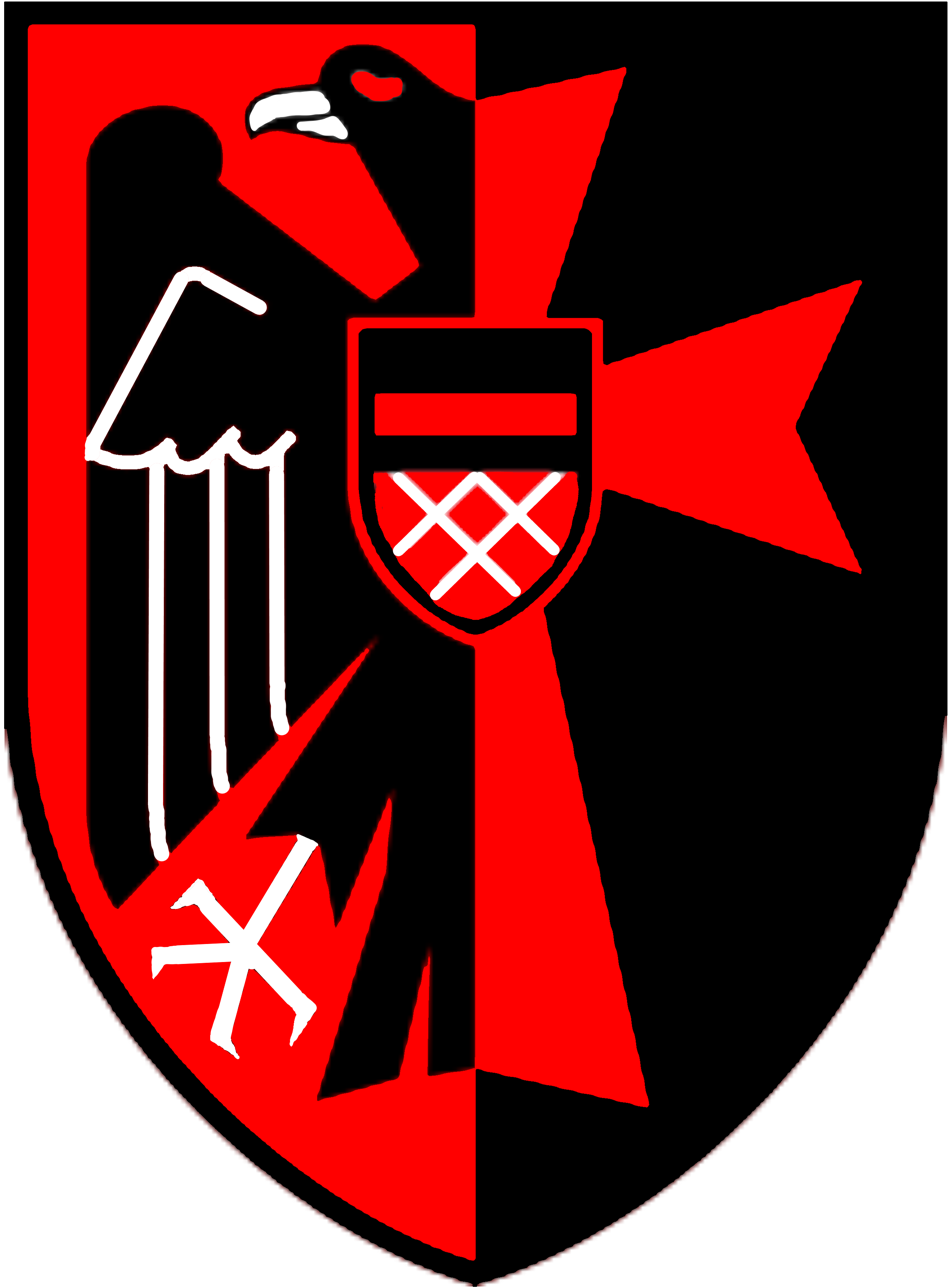
Coat of arms of Sudetendeutsche Landsmannschaft

Many of the Germans who stayed in Czechoslovakia later emigrated to West Germany (more than 100,000). As the German population was transferred out of the country, the former Sudetenland was resettled mostly by Czechs but also by other nationalities of Czechoslovakia: Slovaks, Greeks (arriving in the wake of the Greek Civil War 1946–1949), Carpathian Ruthenians, Romani people and Jews who had survived the Holocaust, and Hungarians (though the Hungarians were forced to do so and later returned home—see Hungarians in Slovakia: Population exchanges).

Some areas, such as part of the Czech Silesian-Moravian borderland, southwestern Bohemia (Šumava National Park), and the western and northern parts of Bohemia, remained depopulated for several strategic reasons (extensive mining and military interests) or are now protected national parks and landscapes. Moreover, before the establishment of the Iron Curtain in 1952 to 1955, the so-called "forbidden zone" was established by means of engineer equipment up to 2 km (1.2 mi) from the border in which no civilians could reside. A wider region, or "border zone", existed up to 12 km (7 miles) from the border in which no "disloyal" or "suspect" civilians could reside or work. Thus, the entire Aš-Bulge fell within the border zone, a status that remained until the Velvet Revolution in 1989.

There remained areas with noticeable German minorities in the westernmost borderland around Cheb, where skilled ethnic German miners and workers continued in mining and industry, until 1955, as sanctioned under the Yalta Conference protocols; in the Egerland, German minority organizations continue to exist.

In the 2021 census, 24,632 people in the Czech Republic claimed German ethnicity, 15,504 of which in combination with another ethnicity, a sharp reduce compared to the 3,123,568 Germans reportedly living in the Czechoslovak Republic in 1921. In the modern day, the Bohemian German dialects and the Moravian German dialects have largely disappeared because remaining Germans employ Standard German.

== See also ==
- Areas annexed by Nazi Germany
- British Committee for Refugees from Czechoslovakia
- Flight and expulsion of Germans (1944–1950)
- Republic of German-Austria
- Germans in Czechoslovakia (1918–1938)
- Pursuit of Nazi collaborators
- Sudetenland Medal
