= Egerland =

Historical region in modern Czechia

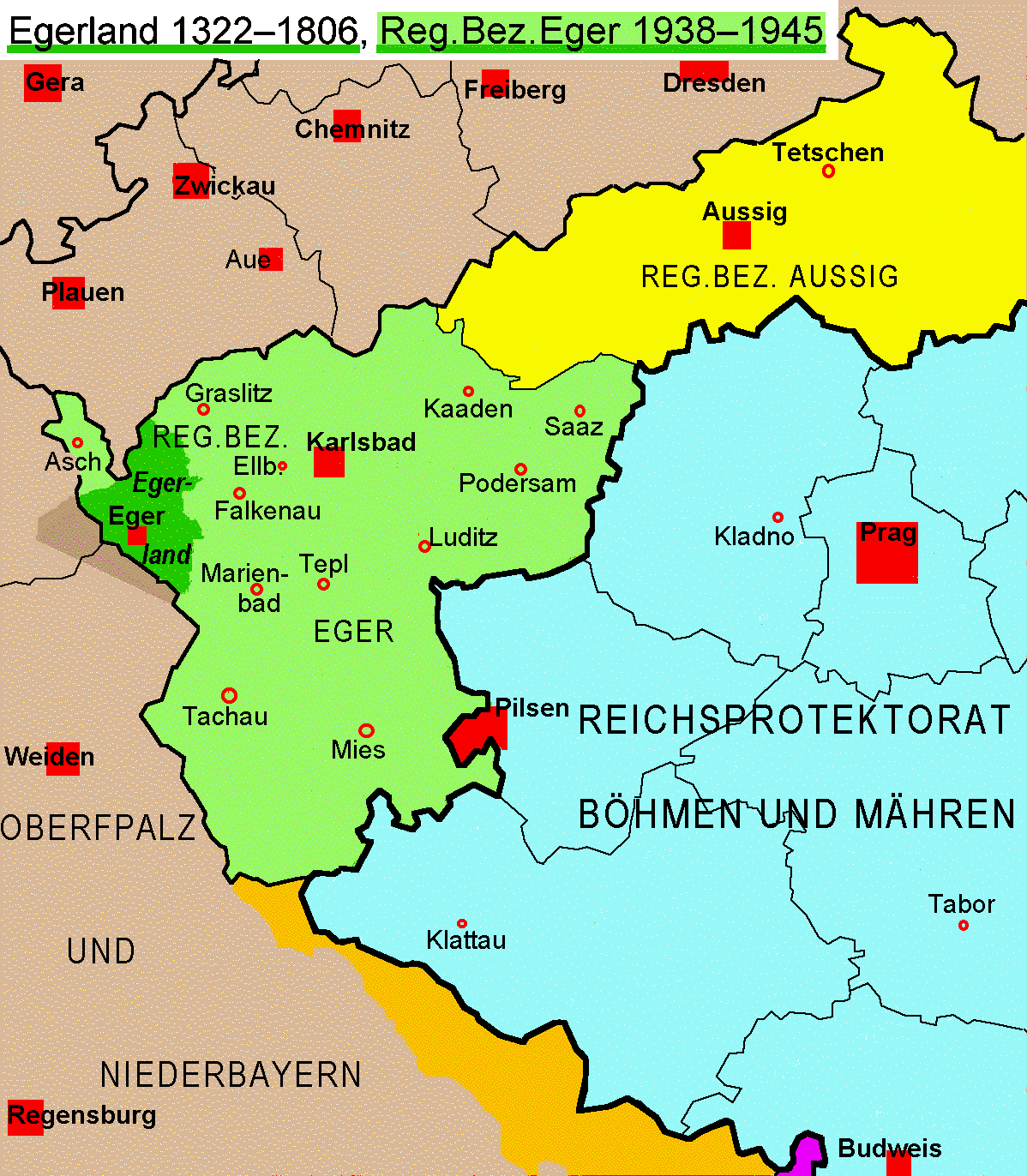
Historical Egerland 1322–1806 and the region (Regierungsbezirk) of Eger 1939–1945

The Egerland (Czech: Chebsko; German: Egerland; Egerland German dialect: Eghalånd) is a historical region in the far north west of Bohemia in what is today the Czech Republic, at the border with Germany. It is named after the German name Eger for the town of Cheb and the main river Ohře.

The north-western panhandle around the town of Aš (Asch) was historically part of Vogtland before being incorporated into the Lands of the Bohemian Crown in the 16th century; it is thus known as Bohemian Vogtland (German: Böhmisches Vogtland; Czech: Fojtsko). The rest of historic Vogtland is divided between the German states of Saxony, Thuringia and Bavaria.

== Geography ==
The Egerland forms the northwestern edge of the Czech Republic. Originally, it was a small region of less than 1,000 km^{2} (390 sq mi) around the historic town of Eger, now named Cheb, roughly corresponding with the present-day Cheb District of the Karlovy Vary Region, originally with the exception of Aš, but including the headwaters of the Ohře river and the area of Marktredwitz in today's Upper Franconia.

In contrast, after the beginning of the German occupation of Czechoslovakia in 1938, Cheb and the historic Egerland were incorporated as part of the "Sudetenland" into an extended area of 7,466 km^{2} (2,883 sq mi). Though the seat of the administration was established at Karlovy Vary (Karlsbad), the entity was officially named Regierungsbezirk Eger in order to reduce territorial claims. It included large Bohemian territories up to the outskirts of Plzeň, comprising cities like Falknov (today Sokolov), Kraslice, Chodov, Mariánské Lázně (Marienbad) and Tachov, which never belonged to the historical region.

All of Egerland and Vogtland lies within the Egrensis Euroregion.

== History ==
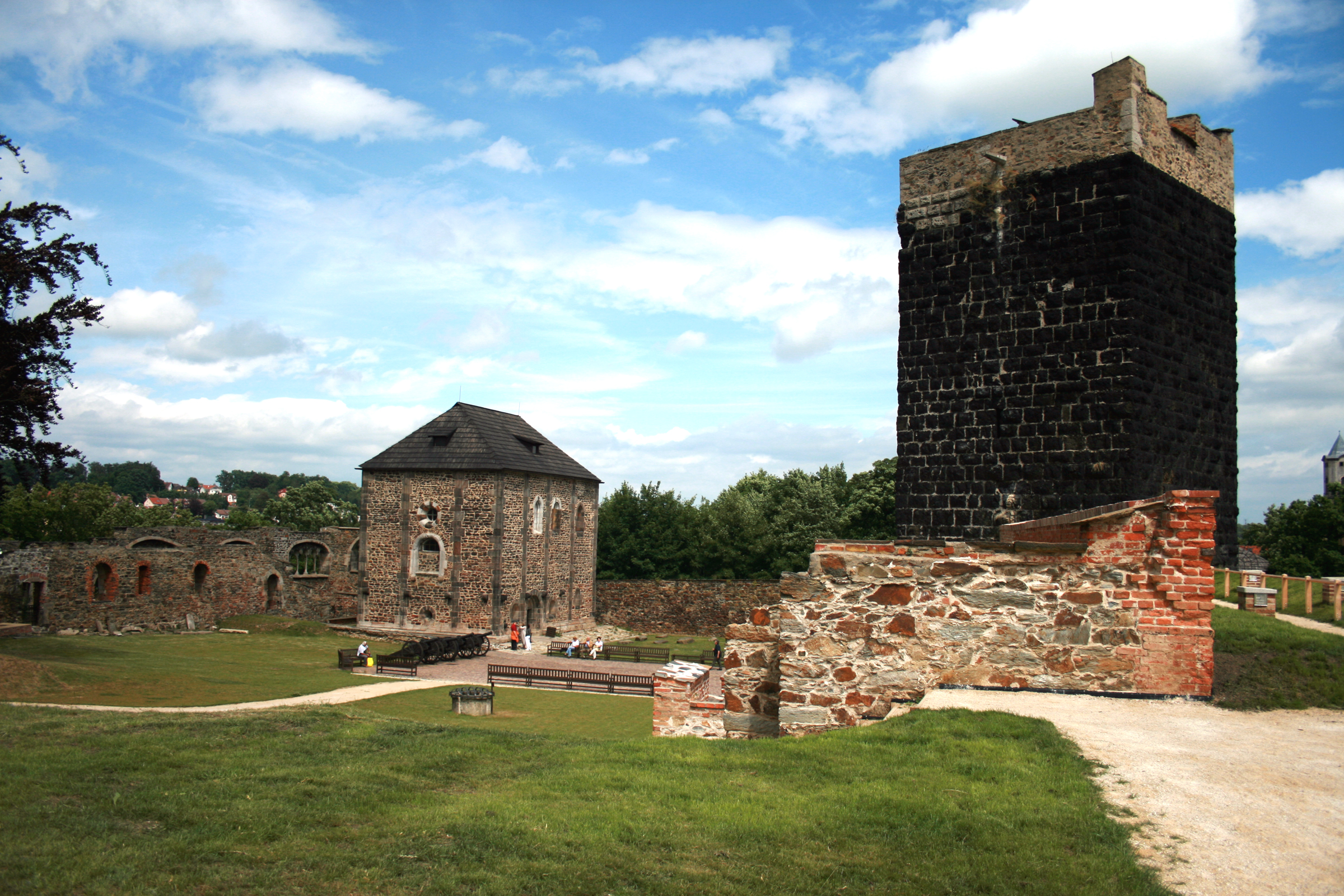
Cheb Castle

The settlement of Eger in the Bavaria Slavica was first mentioned in 1061 records of trade routes laid out in the course of the German Ostsiedlung migration. In 1135 the regio Egere is recorded as a part of the Bavarian March of the Nordgau under the rule of Count Diepold III of Vohburg. After his death in 1146, the Egerland was inherited by the later German Emperor Frederick I Barbarossa of Hohenstaufen by marriage with Diepold's daughter Adelheid. The Staufer finally severed the Provincia Egrensis from Bavaria and built it up as an exemplary model of a Reichsgut territory under immediate rule of the Holy Roman Emperor. Along this development Cheb became the site of a Kaiserpfalz residence (Cheb Castle), the only one in the present-day Czech Republic.

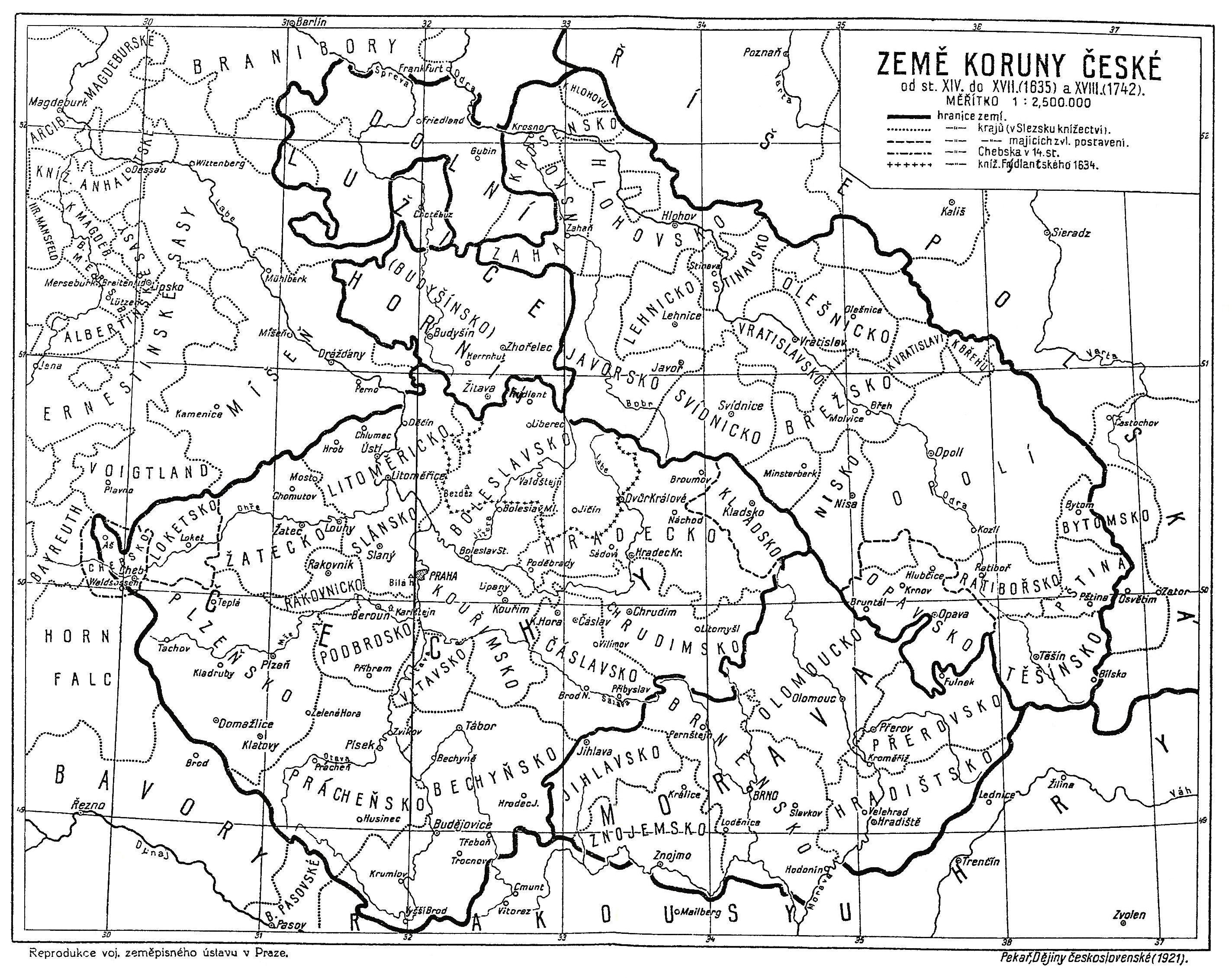
Egerland (Chebsko) as one of the Lands of the Bohemian Crown

=== Kingdom of Bohemia ===
Cheb, a free imperial city since 1277, and the Imperially immediate Egerland were given as a lien to King John of Bohemia in 1322 by Emperor Louis IV of Wittelsbach. In return for John's support against Louis' rival Frederick of Habsburg at the Battle of Mühldorf, he received Eger as a Reichspfandschaft (Imperial lien) with the "guarantee of complete independence from the Kingdom of Bohemia". This reservation, however, became meaningless as Louis never redeemed the pawn, and with the accession of Emperor Charles IV of Luxembourg in 1346, the crowns of the Holy Roman Empire and Bohemia were united in one hand. Charles' successors from the House of Luxembourg and (from 1526) Habsburg continuously eliminated the autonomy of the Egerland against the resistance of the Cheb citizens and the local nobility. While the present-day Franconian parts up to the Fichtel Mountains were acquired by the Principality of Bayreuth under Hohenzollern rule, the remaining territory was administered within the Bohemian kraj of Loket from 1751.

Regierunsgbezirk Eger in cream colour with the remainder of Sudetenland in yellow

The incorporation of the Bohemian kingdom into the Habsburg monarchy had created ongoing conflicts at first along the fault-lines between the Catholic dynasty and the Protestant nobility culminating in the Thirty Years' War. Cheb and the Egerland insisting on their independence tried to maintain a neutral position, they nevertheless were seized as a stronghold by Albrecht von Wallenstein, who was murdered at Cheb on 25 February 1634. In the following decades the absolute Habsburg rulers aimed at a centralized government. Emperor Joseph II on the one hand issued an Edict of Religious Tolerance in 1781, but also denied the Bohemian autonomy by renouncing the ceremony of the coronation as Bohemian king. With the determination of German as official language in all Habsburg lands (instead of Latin), he laid the foundations for future ethnic conflicts. In the course of the dissolution of the Holy Roman Empire of the German Nation in 1806 and the onset of the Austrian Empire, the eastern part of Egerland finally became an ordinary district of the Austrian province of Bohemia.

The suppression during the Age of Metternich led to a second-class status of the Czech people in the Austrian crown land of Bohemia, despite them being much more numerous than the German-speaking population. From about 1830 on Czech scholars like František Palacký encouraged the Austroslavism movement demanding autonomy for the Bohemian crown lands and admission of the Czech language. In the aftermath of the 1848 Spring of Nations, the Czechs, as well as some other Slavic nations, began Pan-Slavic movements aiming at complete independence, fiercely opposed by Pan-German organisations like the German Worker's Party based in Cheb. The rise of ethnic nationalism turned out to be fatal, as, while some central parts of Bohemia were only inhabited by a smaller German-speaking elite, in border regions like the Egerland people who identified as German were in the majority, like in the town of Eger/Cheb, where the Czech population was only 7% per the 1930 census.

=== Czechoslovakia ===
At the end of World War I, the German-speaking population of former Austria-Hungary proclaimed the Republic of German Austria including the Egerland and further peripheral regions of German Bohemia, that were to become part of Czechoslovakia. They demanded the unification with Germany, referring to the self-determination doctrine proclaimed by U.S. president Woodrow Wilson that had been the basis for the dissolution of the Austro-Hungarian Empire. Nevertheless, the Czech majority in the total of Bohemia insisted to "restore their countries in their historical borders", as a revision of alleged Germanization. Both parties acted unilaterally, the Czechs, supported by France and Britain, prevailed establishing the Czechoslovak Republic comprising all parts of historic Bohemia as it existed under Austrian rule, including the Egerland. The German population, a minority in all of Bohemia, but ethnically dominant in the northwestern part of the region, failed in their request for a new border, based upon ethnicity, between predominantly Czech- and predominantly German-speaking parts of the country. The Czech Republic had committed to protecting the equality of all ethnicities incorporated into the new State; however, there was not a legal commitment made until 1937. Also, a request by the German-speaking minority to allow them double citizenship (Austrian/Czech or German/Czech) was declined.

During the years after World War I, with the Versailles Treaty explicitly banning these regions from rejoining Austria or Germany, there was a tendency among the German-speaking minority to adjust to the new political realities and participate in the political process, rather than pursue the quest for political self-determination. However, under a legal framework perceived as "czechification", there was growing unease about laws and policies which were felt to be discriminatory, especially in areas identifying as culturally German or Austrian. Perceived inequalities included the reduction of German-speaking schools and teachers, disadvantageous allocation of public spending and exclusion from public service positions. After years of lobbying by German-speaking minority representatives in the Czech parliament, a law granting full equality and proportional representation in all aspects of civil life was finally implemented in 1937.

With the 1933 Nazi seizure of power in Germany, the separatists of the Sudeten German Party under Konrad Henlein became more and more dominant, calling themselves Sudeten Germans. After Hitler had pushed the situation towards an armed conflict, the prime ministers of Britain and France in the 1938 Munich Agreement backed the annexation of regions with greater than 50% German-speaking population, including the Sudetenland with the Egerland, by Nazi Germany. While a number of Czechs fled from obvious oppression under Nazi rule, there was no systematic expulsion of Czech people. At that time, the term "Egerland" came in use for the western district of the Sudetenland, itself a Reichsgau from 1939 on.

Even in 1942, Edvard Beneš considered 3,25 million Sudeten Germans to be a minority too large for successful absorption into a Czechoslovak state of around 15 million inhabitants. He therefore proposed that Germany should be allowed to keep the Eger triangle and two other districts of little strategic importance.

However, following the German defeat in World War II, the region was rejoined to Czechoslovakia in 1945 and even before further decisions were made at the Potsdam Conference, about 800,000 ethnic Germans were expelled from their ancestral lands to Germany on the basis of the Beneš decrees. In the course of these events, multiple massacres and crimes against humanity are documented, committed on German civilians by ethnic Czechs in 'revenge' for the Nazi occupation. The Czech government later passed a retrograde amnesty for all such crimes committed until October 1945. All possessions of expelled Germans, without compensation, fell to the Czech government. In total, nearly 90,000 were displaced from Egerland proper, almost 800,000 from the short-lived Regierungsbezirk Eger and close to 3 million from the Sudetenland.
