= Province of German South Moravia =

Historically German region of Czechoslovakia

Coordinates: 48°51′N 16°3′E

The Province of German South Moravia (German: Provinz Deutschsüdmähren; Czech: Provincie Německá jižní Morava) was an unrecognised province in Moravia (in the present-day Czech Republic), self-proclaimed on 3 November 1918 by a group of German-speaking local officials who sought attachment to the unrecognised Republic of German-Austria. They did so in reaction to the 18 October 1918 declaration of independence of the First Czechoslovak Republic, a landmark event in the dissolution of Austria-Hungary at the end of the First World War. The local officials named Znaim (Znojmo) as the province's capital, and sought to include parts of southern and western Moravia – at the time largely populated by ethnic Germans – and eventually attach this newly formed "Province of German South Moravia" to the existing Province of Lower Austria.

== History ==
The provinces of German Austria. German South Moravia is the part of the area in pink which is north of the current boundary of Austria (red line).

The claimed territory of German South Moravia was historically an integral part of the Habsburg constituent Margraviate of Moravia. During the First World War it suffered military casualties in greater proportion than any other majority German-speaking area of Austria-Hungary, experiencing 44 war deaths for every 1,000 inhabitants. With the imminent collapse of Habsburg Austria-Hungary at the end of the war, areas of the Czech-majority Moravia with an ethnic German majority began to take actions to avoid joining a new Czechoslovak state. German South Moravia was declared on 3 November 1918 with its capital at Znojmo (German: Znaim). Unlike the self-proclaimed Province of German Bohemia, the Province of German South Moravia never established a proper functioning government.

On 11 November 1918, Emperor Charles I of Austria relinquished power and, on 12 November, the ethnic German areas of the empire were declared the Republic of German Austria with the intent of unifying with Germany. However, the area was quickly taken by the Czechoslovak army with Znojmo falling on 27 December 1918.

The status of German areas in Moravia and Bohemia was definitively settled by the 1919 peace treaties of Versailles and Saint-Germain-en-Laye that declared that the areas belong to Czechoslovakia. The Czechoslovak Government then granted amnesty for all activities against the new state.

The region was then integrated into the Moravian Land of the First Republic of Czechoslovakia and remained a part of it until the Nazi dismemberment of Czechoslovakia when it was added to Germany (Reichsgau Niederdonau). After World War II, the area was returned to Czechoslovakia and is now part of Czech Republic. The near entirety of the German civilian population in German South Moravia—like the rest of Czechoslovakia—was forced out by Czechoslovaks from 1945-1948.

== See also ==
- Republic of German-Austria
- Origins of Czechoslovakia
- Province of the Sudetenland
- Province of German Bohemia
- Bohemian Forest Region

== Literature ==
- Vink, Matthew (2013). Self-Determination along the Austrian Frontier, 1918-1920: Case Studies of German Bohemia, Vorarlberg, and Carinthia (Thesis). Victoria University of Wellington. p. 116.
