= Province of the Bohemian Forest Region =

Coordinates: 48°57′N 13°46′E

The Province of the Bohemian Forest Region or Bohemian Woods (German: Provinz Böhmerwaldgau; Czech: Šumavská župa) was an unrecognised province in Bohemia (in the present-day Czech Republic), self-proclaimed by local German officials at the end of the First World War in reaction to the 18 October 1918 proclamation of independence of the First Czechoslovak Republic. Its stated capital was at Prachatice (German: Prachatitz). It claimed parts of southwestern Bohemia in the Bohemian Forest once mainly populated by ethnic Germans, and sought to attach itself to the province of Upper Austria in the unrecognised Republic of German-Austria, the rump state of Austria-Hungary that was in the process of falling apart.

== History ==
The claimed provinces of German-Austria. The self-proclaimed Province of the Bohemian Forest Region is the area in green north of the current boundary of Austria (red line).

The Bohemian Forest Region was historically an integral part of the Habsburg constituent Kingdom of Bohemia but, with the imminent collapse of Habsburg Austria-Hungary at the end of World War I, areas of the Czech-majority Bohemia with an ethnic German majority began to take actions to avoid joining a new Czechoslovak state.

On 11 November 1918, Emperor Charles I of Austria relinquished power and, on 12 November, the ethnic German areas of the empire were declared the Republic of German Austria with the intent of unifying with Germany. The Province of German Bohemia in the north and west was the part of the state including most of the ethnic Germans in Bohemia. However, ethnic German areas of southwestern Bohemia known as the Bohemian Forest Region with their centre at Prachatice (German: Prachatitz) were added to Upper Austria instead of German Bohemia. However, the area was taken by the Czechoslovak army by the end 1918.

The status of German areas in Bohemia and Moravia was definitively settled by the 1919 peace treaties of Versailles and Saint-Germain-en-Laye that declared that the areas belong to Czechoslovakia. The Czechoslovak Government then granted amnesty for all activities against the new state.

The region was then reintegrated into the Bohemian Land of the First Republic of Czechoslovakia and remained a part of it until the Nazi dismemberment of Czechoslovakia when it was added to Nazi Bavaria and Austria (Ostmark). After World War II, the area was returned to Czechoslovakia and is now part of the Czech Republic.

During the Cold War the border region was closed off, but with the fall of the Iron Curtain it has become a popular tourist destination with 1.8 million visitors per year.

== See also ==
- Republic of German-Austria
- Origins of Czechoslovakia
- Province of German Bohemia
- Province of the Sudetenland
- Province of German South Moravia

== Literature ==
- Vink, Matthew (2013). Self-Determination along the Austrian Frontier, 1918-1920: Case Studies of German Bohemia, Vorarlberg, and Carinthia (Thesis). Victoria University of Wellington. p. 116.
