= Republic of German-Austria =

De facto state in central Europe, 1918–1919

German-Austria Deutschösterreich (German)
- 1918–1919
- Flag Coat of arms

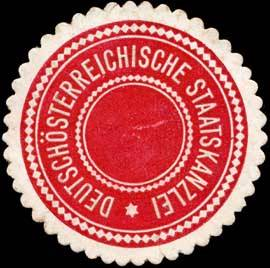
- Seal of the German-Austrian State Chancellery

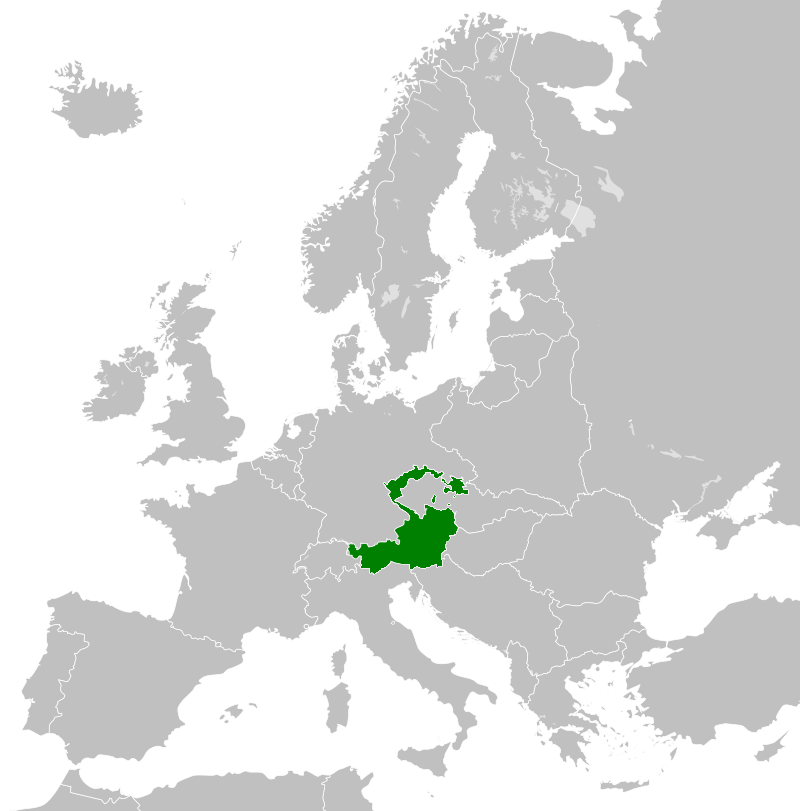
- Territory claimed by German-Austria
- Status: Unrecognized rump state
- Capital: Vienna
- Common languages: German
- Demonym: German-Austrian
- Government: Republic
- Head of state
  - 1918–1919: State Council
  - 1919: Karl Seitz
- Chancellor
  - 1918–1919: Karl Renner
- Legislature: Provisional National Assembly (1918–1919); Constituent National Assembly (from 1919)
- History
  - Proclaimed: 12 November 1918
  - Prohibited by Treaty of St Germain: 10 September 1919
- Currency: Krone
Preceded by
Cisleithania
Succeeded by
First Austrian Republic
Kingdom of Italy
First Czechoslovak Republic
Kingdom of Serbs, Croats and Slovenes
- Today part of: Austria, Czech Republic, Italy, and Slovenia

Map indicating German-speaking areas (red) within the Austro-Hungarian Empire in 1911

The Republic of German-Austria, commonly known as German-Austria (German: Deutschösterreich), was a de facto state that was created following World War I as an initial rump state for areas with a predominantly German-speaking and ethnic German population within what had been the Austro-Hungarian Empire, with plans for eventual unification with Germany. The territories covered an area of 118,311 km^{2} (45,680 sq mi), with 10.4 million inhabitants.

In practice, however, its authority was limited to the Danubian and Alpine provinces which had been the core of Cisleithania. Much of its claimed territory was de facto administered by the newly formed Czechoslovakia, and internationally recognized as such.

Attempts to create German-Austria under these auspices were ultimately unsuccessful, especially since union with Germany was forbidden in the Treaty of Versailles, and the new state of the First Austrian Republic was created in 1920.

== Background ==
The Austrian Empire of the Habsburgs had been reconstituted as a dual monarchy by the Compromise of 1867. It comprised the Magyar-dominated "lands of the Crown of Saint Stephen", the core of which was the Kingdom of Hungary and was sometimes referred to as Transleithania, (Note: The name, and its counterpart Cisleithania, is derived from the River Leitha, which formed the boundary between Upper Austria and Hungary.) and the German-dominated remainder of the empire, informally called "Austria" but semi-officially given the name Cisleithania. Cisleithania included the core "Austrian" provinces, (Note: The collection of Habsburg Hereditary Lands comprising Upper and Lower Austria, Salzburg, Styria, Tyrol, Carinthia and Vorarlberg) together with Carniola, Dalmatia, the Austrian Littoral (Gorizia and Gradisca, Trieste and Istria) to the south, and Bohemia, Moravia, Silesia, Galicia and Bukovina to the north and east. The dual monarchy, or Austria-Hungary as it came to be known, was effectively two states with the Habsburg monarch as Emperor of Austria in Cisleithania and King of Hungary in Transleithania. For the most part, each had their own institutions. There were separate parliaments and separate governments and ministries for "imperial Austria" and "royal Hungary".

Austria-Hungary was a multinational entity comprising Germans and Hungarians, as well as nine other major nationalities, who increasingly demanded the right to self-determination. Historically, the Germans had been dominant in the Habsburg monarchy, and their power and influence greatly outweighed their numbers. Even within Cisleithania the Germans represented only 37% of the population. However, Upper and Lower Austria, Salzburg, Carinthia, Vorarlberg and most of Styria and Tyrol had a predominantly German population. These territories were the core "Austrian" provinces and had a population of 6.5 million. While Bohemia and Moravia were predominantly Czech, Germans constituted a majority in a strip of territories that edged their borders, recently self-proclaimed as provinces of the Sudetenland and German Bohemia. The German population of Bohemia and Moravia was 3 million.

From 1914 to 1918, Austria-Hungary fought in the First World War as one of the Central Powers and an ally of Germany. By May 1918, the empire was facing increasing military failure and defeat, as well as domestic unrest caused by food and fuel shortages. Additionally, the demands of the empire's nationalities were becoming increasingly radicalised, encouraged by the American president Woodrow Wilson's commitment to self-determination in his Fourteen Points published in January 1918. In October, the independence of Czechoslovakia and the State of Slovenes, Croats and Serbs (the latter unified with Serbia that December to form the Kingdom of Serbs, Croats and Slovenes, later called Yugoslavia), Hungary withdrew from the dual monarchy and the Austro-Hungarian army surrendered to Italy at Vittorio Veneto. With the empire collapsing, the Habsburg administration signed an armistice on 3 November and the last Habsburg emperor, Karl I, relinquished his powers on 11 November. (Note: In fact, Karl never formally abdicated. Instead, he simply declared in his statement of 11 November 1918: "I renounce every participation in the business of the state.")

== History ==
=== Declaration of the Republic ===
On 21 October 1918, the deputies representing German-speaking areas in the Abgeordnetenhaus, the lower chamber of the Reichsrat, the imperial Parliament of Cisleithania, declared that they were the new Provisional National Assembly for German-Austria. With the impending collapse of the empire becoming apparent earlier in the month, the three main political groupings representing German-speakers in the lower chamber began negotiations on the way forward. The largest group was the German nationalists, a collection of smaller parties, with a total of 109 deputies elected in the last imperial elections, in 1911. Their primary objective was Anschluss or union with Germany. The conservative monarchist Christian Social Party was the next largest with 65 deputies and the Social Democrats, who favoured a democratic republic, had a representation of 37 deputies.

In early October 1918, the Social Democrats were the first to call for all "German-Austrians" to be united in a German-Austrian state. They had recognised the right of all nationalities of the empire to self-determination and they said this should equally apply to German-Austrians. The German nationalists were willing to accept the Social Democrat position to allow further negotiation to take place. The Christian Social Party accepted it as well, but said they had reservations because of their "religious and dynastic convictions". Calling themselves "the Germans of the Alps and Sudetens", all 208 deputies met on 21 October, and unanimously voted that they now constituted the "Provisional National Assembly" for German-Austria. They declared that:

the German people in Austria are resolved to determine their own future political organization to form an independent German-Austrian state, and to regulate their relations with other nations through free agreements with them.

They also elected three Presidents of the Assembly, one from each of the three political groupings: Franz Dinghofer (de) of the German National Movement, Jodok Fink of the Christian Social Party, and the Social Democrat Karl Seitz. A 20-member executive committee was appointed to make constitutional recommendations to the Assembly and, on the committee's subsequent recommendation, a State Council was created as an executive body on 30 October. The Council immediately nominated 14 State Secretaries to head up an administrative structure that mirrored the imperial ministries. As at the end of October, therefore, the German-speaking part of the empire effectively had two governments: the new administration created by the Provisional National Assembly and the imperial government appointed by the emperor under Heinrich Lammasch, last minister-president of Cisleithania. The monarchy was still formally in existence and, in fact, the imperial government was pleased with the constitutional measures brought in on 30 October, believing that they did not assume a republican form and preserved the potential for the continuation of the monarchy.

On 25 October, the Provisional Assembly called on all German-inhabited Lands to form their own provisional assemblies.

On 11 November 1918, Karl I gave up his right to take part in Austrian affairs of state. He deliberately avoided using the term "abdication", as he wanted to retain his freedom of action in the event that his Austrian subjects recalled him. Nevertheless, this decision effectively ended 700 years of Habsburg rule.

The next day, 12 November, the National Assembly officially declared German-Austria a republic and named Social Democrat Karl Renner as provisional chancellor. On the same day it drafted a provisional constitution that stated that "German-Austria is a democratic republic" (Article 1) and "German-Austria is an integral part of the German republic" (Article 2). The latter provision reflected the deputies' view that felt that Austria would lose so much territory in any peace settlement that it would no longer be economically and politically viable as a separate state, and the only course was union with Germany. This was enforced by the refusal of Hungary to sell grain and of Czechoslovakia to sell coal to Austria-Germany.

As the Empire collapsed and a ceasefire was announced, the Provisional Assembly sought to forestall socialist revolution by organizing a coalition government led by the minority Social Democrats. Karl Renner became Chancellor and Victor Adler became Foreign Minister. The Social Democrats co-opted newly created soldier and worker councils and used their control over labour unions to implement social policies that blunted the socialist appeal.

Karl went into exile in Switzerland on 24 March 1919. Angered that he had left without a formal abdication, Parliament passed the Habsburg Law, which dethroned the Habsburgs and confiscated their property. Karl was permanently banished from Austria, while other male Habsburgs could return only if they gave up all claims to the throne.

=== Constitutional Assembly ===
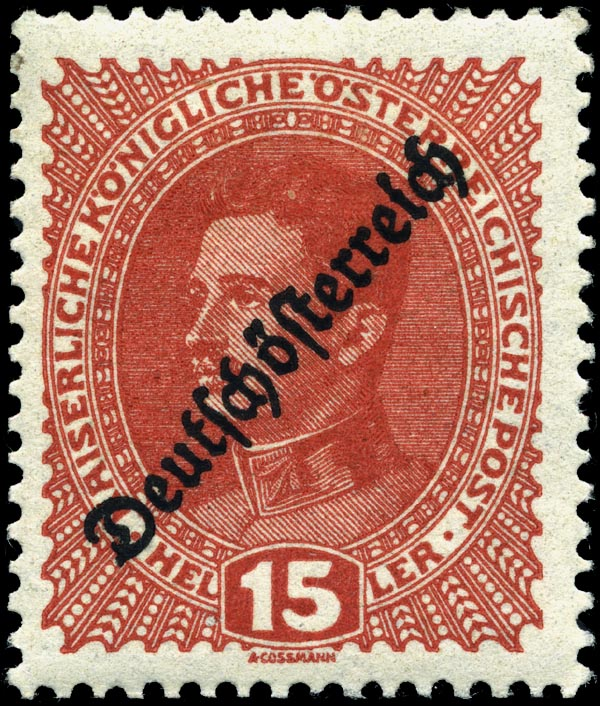
Austro-Hungarian postal stamp used in German-Austria

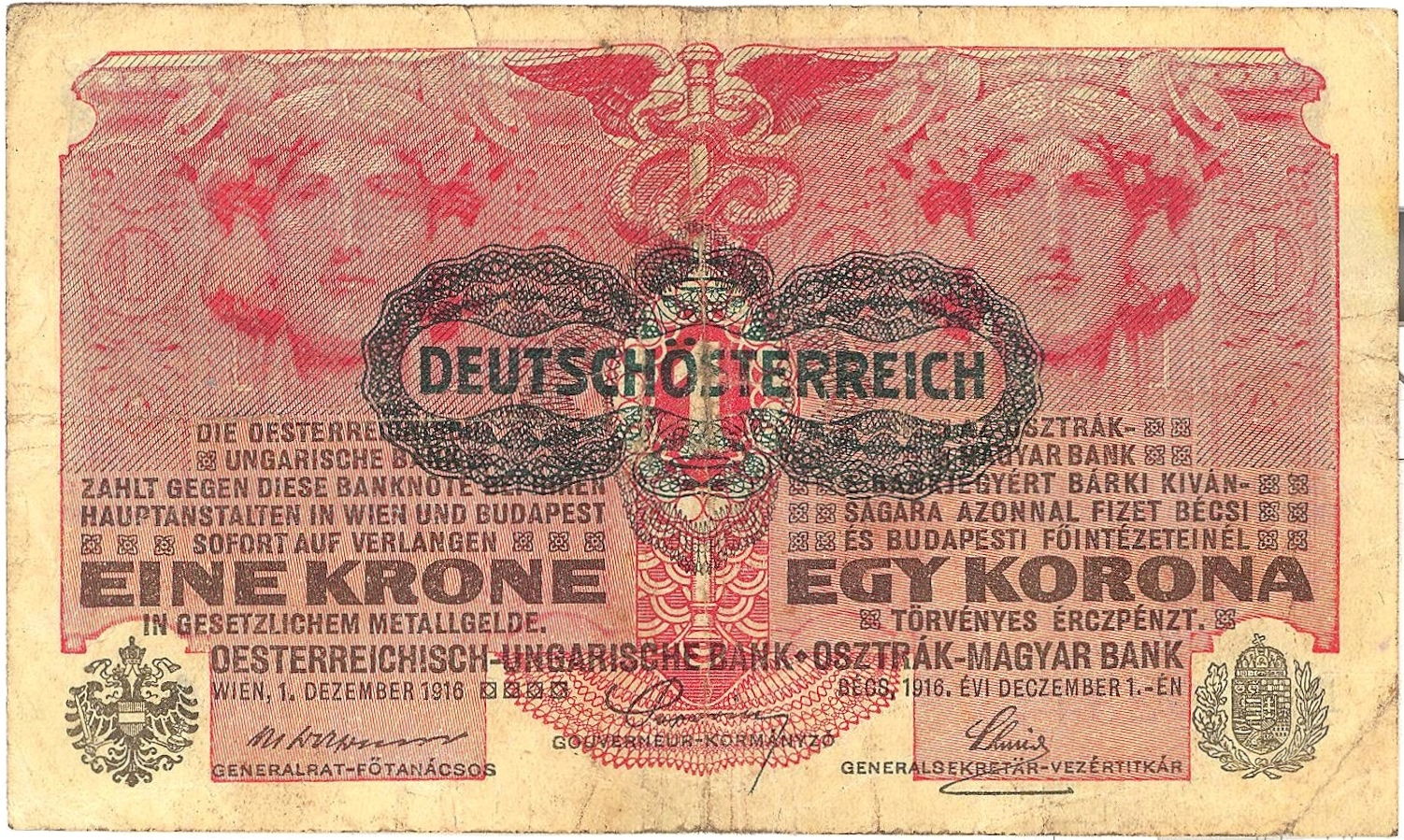
One-krone banknote, overprinted with the name Deutschösterreich ("German-Austria")

Elections to the Constituent Assembly were held on 16 February 1919 and for the first time women were allowed to vote. Out of the 38 German inhabited constituencies only 25 participated and 159 deputies were elected to the 170 seats with Social Democrats as the largest party. Social Democrats won 72 seats, Christians Socials 69 and German Nationalists 26. The Constituent National Assembly first met on 4 March 1919 and on 15 March a new government was formed, once again led by Karl Renner. Austrian Social Democrats, despite being one of the leading Marxist parties with its Austromarxism current, did not attempt to seize power or to institute socialism. However, the majority of conservative, Catholic politicians still distrusted them and this led to the fatal left–right split that plagued the First Republic and led to its downfall by 1934.

Social Democrat leader Otto Bauer wrote:

German-Austria is not an organism which has followed the laws of historical growth. It is nothing but the remnant of what remained of the old Empire after other nations had broken away from it. It remained as a loose bundle of divergent Lands.

=== Failed union with Germany ===
On 13 November 1918, German-Austria asked Germany to start negotiations of union and on 15 November sent a telegram to President Wilson to support union of Germany and Austria.

On 12 March 1919, the Constituent Assembly re-confirmed an earlier declaration that German-Austria was a constituent part of the German republic. Pan-Germanists and Social Democrats supported the union with Germany, while the Christian Social Party was less supportive.

During spring and summer of 1919, unity talk meetings between German and Austrian representatives continued. All this changed after 2 June 1919 when the draft peace treaty with Austria was presented, which demonstrated that the Western Allies were opposed to any union between Germany and Austria.

=== Treaty of Saint Germain ===
After submitting a formal note of protest to the Allies against blocking German-Austrian union, on 10 September 1919 Renner signed the Treaty of Saint Germain and it was ratified by the Constituent National Assembly on 17 October. According to its provisions, on 21 October the country changed its official name from "Republic of German-Austria" to "Republic of Austria". It also lost the Sudetenland and German Bohemia to Czechoslovakia, South Tyrol and Istria (including the Adriatic port of Trieste) to the Kingdom of Italy, and Carniola, Lower Styria and Dalmatia to the Kingdom of Serbs, Croats, and Slovenes.

Article 88 of the treaty, sometimes called a "pre-Anschluss attempt", stated:

The independence of Austria is inalienable otherwise than with the consent of the Council of the League of Nations. Consequently Austria undertakes in the absence of the consent of the said Council to abstain from any act which might directly or indirectly or by any means whatsoever compromise her independence, particularly, and until her admission to membership of the League of Nations, by participation in the affairs of another Power.

This clause effectively foreclosed any attempt by Austria to unite with Germany.

Likewise, the Treaty of Versailles, dictating the terms of peace for Germany, forbade any union between Austria and Germany. With these changes and the settling of Austria's frontiers, the era of the First Republic of Austria began.

== Borders ==
Lands claimed by German-Austria in 1918

On 22 November, the national assembly officially claimed sovereignty over all the majority-German territory of the former Habsburg realm: a total area of 118,311 km^{2} (45,680 sq mi) with 10.4 million inhabitants. This included nearly all the territory of present-day Austria, plus South Tyrol and the town of Tarvisio, both now in Italy; southern Carinthia and southern Styria, now in Slovenia; the recently proclaimed provinces of Sudetenland and German Bohemia (which later became parts of Nazi Sudetenland), now in the Czech Republic; and East Silesia (now divided between Poland and Czech Republic). In practice, however, its authority was limited to the Danubian and Alpine provinces of the old Habsburg realm—with few exceptions, most of present-day Austria.

However, the Allies of World War I opposed such a move. They had committed themselves to the cause of the Habsburg realm's minorities, and assumed almost without question that they wished to leave Austria and Hungary. German-Austria was largely powerless to prevent the forces of Italy, Czechoslovakia, and the Kingdom of Serbs, Croats, and Slovenes from seizing some of its territory.

Countries on the winning side of the war took many territories with German majorities. The Czechs insisted on the historic borders of the Lands of the Bohemian Crown; thus, three million Germans became Czechoslovak citizens, an indirect precipitant of the Sudetenland crisis 20 years later. A victor nation, Italy occupied and was awarded Trentino and South Tyrol, of which South Tyrol is still majority German-speaking. The Kingdom of Serbs, Croats, and Slovenes (later Yugoslavia) was given parts of Carinthia and Styria. The Klagenfurt region was retained after a plebiscite on 20 October 1920, when three-fifths of voters voted to remain with Austria.

Later plebiscites in the provinces of Tyrol and Salzburg yielded majorities of 98 and 99% in favor of a unification with Germany whereas Vorarlberg in May 1919 held a plebiscite where 81% supported accession to Switzerland.

Several German minority populations in Moravia, including German populations in Brno (Brünn), Jihlava (Iglau) and Olomouc (Olmütz), as well as the German enclave of Gottschee in Carniola also attempted to proclaim their union with German-Austria, but failed. The areas now outside of the current Republic of Austria often had significant non-German minorities and occasionally non-German majorities and were quickly taken by troops of the respective countries they were to eventually join.

Regarding East Silesia, plans for a plebiscite fell through, and the area was divided between Czechoslovakia and Poland.

On the other hand, ethnic Germans in the western part of the Kingdom of Hungary that formed a majority in the area known as German West Hungary and agitated to join to Austria were successful and the area became the state of Burgenland, with the notable exception of the region around the city of Ödenburg (Sopron) which was also intended to be the state capital, but due to a very contentious plebiscite, remained part of Hungary. The only other part of the former German counties of Burgenland in the Kingdom of Hungary also not to become part of the Austrian Republic due to the treaty was Preßburg (Bratislava) which went to Czechoslovakia (now the capital of Slovakia).

=== Subdivisions ===
German-Austria originally consisted of nine provinces (Provinzen):

1. Upper Austria (Oberösterreich), all of the current Austrian state of Upper Austria plus the Bohemian Forest region (Böhmerwaldgau) now in the South Bohemian Region of the Czech Republic;
2. Lower Austria (Niederösterreich), all of the current Austrian state of Lower Austria and the city-state of Vienna, plus German South Moravia (Deutschsüdmähren), now divided between the Czech regions of South Bohemia, Vysočina, and South Moravia;
3. German Bohemia (Deutschböhmen), areas of western Bohemia that were later part of Sudetenland from 1938 to 1945, now part of the Czech Republic;
4. Sudetenland, parts of the historical regions of Moravia and Austrian Silesia. Boundaries do not correspond to later use of the term Sudetenland.
5. Styria (Steiermark), most of historical Styria including the current Austrian state of Styria and the north-eastern part of the Slovenian informal region of Lower Styria;
6. Salzburg, all of the current Austrian state of Salzburg;
7. Carinthia (Kärnten), all of historical Carinthia including the current Austrian state of Carinthia, the Slovenian unofficial region of Carinthia, the Slovenian municipality of Jezersko and the now Italian municipalities of Tarvisio, Malborghetto Valbruna and Pontebba;
8. German Tyrol (Deutschtirol), most of historical Tyrol including the current Austrian state of Tyrol and the present-day Italian province of South Tyrol, but not the current Italian province of Trentino;
9. Vorarlberg, all of the current Austrian state of Vorarlberg.

== National anthem ==
Despite the prohibition of the use of the term "German-Austria", the republic's unofficial national anthem between 1920 and 1929 was "German Austria, you wonderful country" (Deutschösterreich, du herrliches Land). Its words were penned by then-Chancellor Karl Renner, a signatory of the Treaty of Saint Germain.

== See also ==
- History of Austria
- List of historical unrecognized states and dependencies

== Bibliography ==
- Barker, Elisabeth (1973). Austria 1918–1972. Palgrave Macmillan. pp. 27–28. ISBN 978-0-333-13369-9.
- Beller, Steven (2006). A Concise History of Austria. Cambridge University Press. ISBN 978-0-52147-886-1.
- Boyer, John W. (1995). Culture and Political Crisis in Vienna: Christian Socialism in Power, 1897-1918. University Of Chicago Press. ISBN 978-0-22606-961-6.
- Brennan, Christopher (2018). "'Hesitant Heir and Reluctant Ruler': Karl I/IV of Austria-Hungary During the Great War". In Glencross, Matthew; Rowbotham, Judith (eds.). Monarchies and the Great War. Palgrave Macmillan. ISBN 978-3-319-89514-7.
- Brodbeck, David Lee (2014). Defining Deutschtum: Political Ideology, German Identity, and Music-critical Discourse in Liberal Vienna. Oxford University Press. ISBN 978-0-19-936270-7.
- Gerwath, Robert (2020). November 1918: The German Revolution. Oxford University Press. ISBN 978-0-19954-647-3.
- Gulick, Charles A. (2021). Austria from Habsburg to Hitler: Volume 1 – Labor's Workshop of Democracy. University of California Press. ISBN 978-0-52032-762-7.
- Healy, Maureen (2004). Vienna and the Fall of the Habsburg Empire: Total War and Everyday Life in World War I. Cambridge University Press. ISBN 978-0-521-83124-6.
- Kriechbaumer, Robert (2001). Die grossen Erzählungen der Politik: Politische Kultur und Parteien in Österreich von der Jahrhundertwende bis 1945. Böhlau. ISBN 978-3-20599-400-8.
- Jelavich, Barbara (1987). Modern Austria: Empire and Republic, 1815–1986. Cambridge University Press. p. 151. ISBN 978-0-521-31625-5.
- Johnson, Lonnie R. (2008). "Austria". In Kaplan, David H.; Herb, Guntram H. (eds.). Nations and Nationalism: A Global Historical Overview, vol. 2. ABC-CLIO. ISBN 978-1-85109-907-8.
- Magocsi, Paul Robert (2018). Historical Atlas of Central Europe (3rd ed.). University of Washington Press. p. 145. ISBN 978-1-4875-2331-2.
- Moos, Carlo (2017). "Südtirol im St. Germain-Kontext". In Georg Grote and Hannes Obermair (ed.). A Land on the Threshold. South Tyrolean Transformations, 1915–2015. Oxford-Berne-New York: Peter Lang. pp. 27–39. ISBN 978-3-0343-2240-9.
- Motyl, Alexander J., ed. (2001). "Austro-Hungarian Empire". Encyclopedia of Nationalism, vol. 2. Academic Press. ISBN 978-0-12227-230-1.
- Pelinka, Anton (2015). "A Delicate Relationship: Austria's Oversensitivity - Germany's Undersensitivity?". In Eberlein, Burkard; Schneider, Volker (eds.). Complex Democracy: Varieties, Crises, and Transformations. Springer. ISBN 978-3-319-15849-5.
- Thaler, Peter (2001). The Ambivalence of Identity: The Austrian Experience of Nation-building in a Modern Society. Purdue University Press. ISBN 978-1-55753-201-5.
- Strong, David F. (1939). Austria. (October 1918–March 1919). Transition from Empire to Republic. Columbia University Press. doi:10.7312/stro90430. ISBN 9780231878708.
