= Province of German Bohemia =

1918-1919

Province of German Bohemia Provinz Deutschböhmen (German)
- Unrecognised province of the Republic of German-Austria
- 1918–1919
- Province of German Bohemia as shown within the claimed territories of German-Austria.
- Capital: Reichenberg
- Area
  - Coordinates: 50°46′N 15°4′E
  - 1918: 14,496 km^{2} (5,597 sq mi)
- Population
  - 1918: 2,350,000
- History
  - Established: 29 October 1918
  - Treaty of Saint-Germain-en-Laye: 10 September 1919
Preceded by	Succeeded by
Austria-Hungary	First Czechoslovak Republic
- Today part of: Czech Republic

The Province of German Bohemia (German: Provinz Deutschböhmen [ˈdɔʏtʃbøːmən]; Czech: Německé Čechy) was an unrecognised province in Bohemia (in the present-day Czech Republic), self-proclaimed by a group of German-speaking deputies of the Imperial Council of Austria on 29 October 1918 at the end of the First World War. With the proclamation, the German-speaking deputies from northern and western parts of Bohemia attempted to secede from the First Czechoslovak Republic (which had declared independence from Austria-Hungary on 18 October 1918), and sought to attach themselves to the unrecognised Republic of German-Austria.

The proclaimers laid claim to parts of northern and western Bohemia, at that time primarily populated by ethnic Germans. Important population centers within the envisioned province were Reichenberg (now Liberec), Aussig (Ústí nad Labem), Teplitz-Schönau (Teplice), Dux (Duchcov), Eger (Cheb), Marienbad (Mariánské Lázně), Karlsbad (Karlovy Vary), Gablonz an der Neiße (Jablonec nad Nisou), Leitmeritz (Litoměřice), Brüx (Most) and Saaz (Žatec). The land claimed for the province would later be associated with the "Sudetenland".

== Background ==
Territories constituting the provincie of German Bohemia had previously been an integral part of the Duchy and Kingdom of Bohemia (itself part of the Holy Roman Empire from 1102), although with different ethnic development. After the Migration Period, German tribes had largely left the Bohemian areas and the region had become home to a predominantly Slavic population.

As the Bohemian lands modernized in the 19th century, Czech nationalism grew, intellectually developed as a combination of noble provincial particularism and historical revivalism promoted by middle-class intellectuals. Political German nationalism in Austria did not exist on its own, but in a context of many competing nationalisms. On the other hand, German liberals believed that their predominance had a universal basis in the values of constitutionalism, parliamentary government and rule of law. As Germans felt more marginalized in Bohemia, the Germans' views began shifting to alleged racial and cultural superiority. Czech nationalism eventually turned just as radical as German nationalism.

The remaining 70 years of existence Austrian and Austro-Hungarian Empire were filled by increasing nationalist tensions and struggling between gradually strengthening Bohemian-Czechs (c. 2/3 of all inhabitants of the Czech lands) and Bohemian-Germans, but also with several attempts for striking a compromise. For example, the Kremsier Constitution provided for a solution in that the historical regions were to remain, but that they should be further subdivided along ethnic boundaries. Such an idea of ethnic subdivision of Bohemia was accepted by many German parties but was strongly opposed by the Czech.

== Proclamation ==
With the imminent collapse of Habsburg Austria-Hungary at the end of First World War, some German-speaking deputies of the Imperial Council of Austria, as well as local German-speaking officials in areas of Bohemia with an ethnic German majority, were wary of the prospect that they would enter into a minority position if the whole of Bohemia and Moravia were to be incorporated into the new Czechoslovak Republic, which had declared its independence on 18 October 1918. These German-speaking politicians made various efforts to prevent German-majority areas in Bohemia from breaking away from the Austrian heartland around Vienna, as the Czechoslovaks intended. On 27 October 1918, Egerland declared independence from the province of Bohemia and a day later the independence of Czechoslovak Republic was proclaimed in the Bohemian capital of Prague. On 11 November 1918, Emperor Charles I of Austria relinquished power and, on 12 November, ethnic German areas of the empire were declared to be part of new the Republic of German Austria, with the intent of unifying with the German Reich. Appealing to the principle of self-determination, the province of German Bohemia was formed from the part of Bohemia that contained primarily ethnic Germans. The claimed capital of the province was at Reichenberg.

At the Paris Peace Conference, Czechoslovak Foreign Minister Edvard Beneš demanded incorporation of the German-speaking lands, alleging that without these lands Czechia would not survive economically. The German-Bohemian lands had been the most industrialized regions in all of Austria-Hungary. The Czechs denied existence of a closed German language area, and allegedly distorted demographic maps such that the area between Komotau and Teplitz appeared as Czech-settled. At the Paris Peace Conference, proposed border corrections of Bohemia such that Eger, Rumburg, Friedland, and Freiwaldau were to become part of Germany.

In 1919, the territory of the unrecognised province was inhabited by 2.23 million ethnic Germans, and 116,275 ethnic Czechs.

Three other provinces were proclaimed alongside German Bohemia, also made up of predominantly German-speaking parts:

- Province of the Sudetenland (northeastern Bohemia proper, northern Moravia and western Austrian Silesia) – this province had radically different (smaller) boundaries than later conceptions of the term "Sudetenland"
- German South Moravia (southern Moravia and southeastern Bohemia) – planned adjoining to Lower Austria
- Bohemian Forest Region (southwestern Bohemia) – planned adjoining to Upper Austria

According to Vink (2013), "Of the four newly established German provinces in the Czech lands, only German Bohemia established a proper functioning administration."

On 29 November 1918, the Czechoslovak army began an invasion of the province of German Bohemia and during December it occupied the whole region. They took Reichenberg on 16 December and the last major city, Leitmeritz, on 27 December 1918. The other short-lived secessionist provinces came to a similar end.

The legal status of the German-speaking areas in Bohemia, Moravia, and Austrian Silesia was eventually settled by the 1919 peace treaties of Versailles and Saint-Germain-en-Laye, which stipulated that the areas belong to solely to Czechoslovakia. The Czechoslovak government then granted amnesty for all activities against the new state. The region that had been German Bohemia was reintegrated into the Province of Bohemia (Země česká) of the Czechoslovak Republic. German Bohemian activists had however hoped that the new state would be built as a Swiss-type decentralized state, which had been implied by Czech officials to appease the Western Allies who were concerned about the status of the large minorities.

== Legacy (1938–1945) ==
According to the Munich Agreement Czechoslovakia was forced to give up the German-inhabited areas of its domain, at the behest of Nazi Germany. The Nazis would incorporate the former unrecognised province of German Bohemia into the Reichsgau Sudetenland, a new administrative unit that contained northern parts of German-speaking areas of the former Bohemian Crown. Around 165,000 Czechs who lived in these areas quickly fled (or were forced to flee) in fear of reprisals by the Sudetendeutsches Freikorps, a Nazi-sponsored militia. A half year later, however, Germany invaded the remaining parts of the Czech lands (in German called Rest-Tschechei, "Remaining Czechia"), and carved out new puppet state from the formerly independent country.

After the war, all of this land was reincorporated into renewed Czechoslovak Republic. The vast majority of the German population (more than 94%) were expelled from Czechoslovak territory: many were killed or died during their flight from both Czech and Soviet attackers.

== See also ==
- Republic of German-Austria
- Origins of Czechoslovakia
- Province of the Sudetenland
- German South Moravia
- Bohemian Forest Region
