= Province of the Sudetenland =

Province of the Republic of German-Austria (1918-1919)

Province of the Sudetenland Provinz Sudetenland (German)
- Province of the Republic of German-Austria
- 1918–1919
- Flag

- Province of the Sudetenland as shown within German Austria, colored in orange
- Capital: Troppau
- Demonym: Sudeten Germans
- Area
  - Coordinates: 49°56′N 17°54′E
  - 1919: 6,534 km^{2} (2,523 sq mi)
- Population
  - 1919: 671.800
- Historical era: Interwar period
  - Established: 29 October 1918
  - Treaty of Saint-Germain-en-Laye: 10 September 1919
Preceded by	Succeeded by
Austria-Hungary	First Czechoslovak Republic
- Today part of: Czech Republic

The Province of the Sudetenland (German: Provinz Sudetenland) was established on 29 October 1918 by former members of the Cisleithanian Imperial Council, the governing legislature of the crumbling Austro-Hungarian Empire. It consisted of German-speaking parts of Moravia, Bohemia and Austrian Silesia, and was meant to become an integral part of the newly proclaimed Republic of German-Austria.

The province was originally established by the provisional government of the so-called "German Moravia", which meant to represent German interests in Moravia. The provisional capital was declared as Troppau (Opava). It mimicked a similar provincial establishment in Bohemia, where Reichenberg (Liberec) became the capital.

Along with various other German-speaking parts, these provinces were intended to eventually integrate into Austria, on the basis of Woodrow Wilson’s Fourteen Points, which emphasized the right to self-determination of peoples. This would not come to pass, however. Both the provinces of German Bohemia and German Moravia were given to the newly proclaimed Czechoslovak Republic. Czechoslovak troops occupied the province by the beginning of 1919, and the position of the said province within Czechoslovakia was confirmed by the Treaty of Saint-Germain-en-Laye, which was signed 10 September 1919, and the province was disestablished in the same day.

In 1919, about 646,800 (96.2%) ethnic Germans lived within the province, along with about 25,000 (3.7%) ethnic Czechs.

The majority of ethnic Germans in all of Czechoslovakia, including what was once this province, were expelled after the Second World War.

== See also ==
- Republic of German-Austria
- Origins of Czechoslovakia
- Province of German Bohemia
- Province of German South Moravia
- Bohemian Forest Region

== Literature ==
- Adrian von Arburg (in German): Die Festlegung der Staatsgrenze zwischen der Tschechoslowakei und Deutschland nach dem Münchener Abkommen 1938. Grin Verlag, 2008, ISBN 978-3-638-016-48-3.
- Emil Franzel (in German): Sudetendeutsche Geschichte. Mannheim 1978, ISBN 3-8083-1141-X.
- Vink, Matthew (2013). Self-Determination along the Austrian Frontier, 1918-1920: Case Studies of German Bohemia, Vorarlberg, and Carinthia (Thesis). Victoria University of Wellington. p. 116.
