= Origins of Czechoslovakia =

The creation of Czechoslovakia in 1918 was the culmination of the long struggle of the Czechs against their Austrian rulers and of the Slovaks against Magyarization and their Hungarian rulers.

== Early history ==
The ancestors of the Czechs and the Slovaks were united in the so-called Samo's Empire for about 30 years in the 7th century. The ancestors of the Slovaks and the Moravians were later united in Great Moravia between 833 and 907. The Czechs were part of Great Moravia for only about seven years before they split from it in 895. Furthermore, in the second half of the 10th century, the Czechs conquered and controlled western Slovakia for around 30 years. That was the last time the two nations were united; the Hungarians had conquered Slovakia by the 11th century, but the Czechs maintained their own principality (a kingdom from 1198) of Bohemia from around 900 to 1918.

Both Czechs and Slovaks struggled against powerful neighbouring peoples: Germans in the case of the Czechs and Hungarians in the case of the Slovaks (see History of the Czech Republic and History of Slovakia). Contacts between the Czechs and the Slovaks arose in the late 14th century, when Slovaks started to study at the University of Prague; in the 15th century, with the campaigns of the Czech Hussite armies to Slovakia; and in the 17th century, when Czech Protestants fled to Slovakia. Between the 15th and the 18th centuries, some educated Slovaks used written Czech as well as Slovak and Latin (see History of the Slovak language). The Czechs and Slovaks were also formally united in 1436–1439, 1453–1457, and 1490–1918, when Hungary (which included Slovakia), Bohemia and other Central European states were ruled by the same kings.

== Late 19th and early 20th centuries ==
At the end of the nineteenth century, the Czech and Slovak situations were very different because of their overlords' different stages of development within Austria-Hungary (the Austrians in Bohemia, the Hungarians in Slovakia). The only common feature was Bohemia's status as the most industrialized part of Austria and Slovakia, albeit itself to different degrees:

- In Bohemia, a vigorous industrial revolution transformed a peasant nation into a differentiated society that included industrial workers, a middle class, and intellectuals. Under the influence of the Enlightenment and romanticism, the Czech national revival led to the establishment of the National Museum in 1818 and the National Theatre in 1881. Moreover, some Czechs were making political demands that included the reconstitution of an autonomous Bohemian Kingdom. The Czech cultural and political achievements were vigorously opposed by Bohemian Germans, who feared losing their privileged position. On the eve of World War I, the Czech leader Tomáš Masaryk began propagating the Czechoslovak idea, namely the reunion of Czechs and Slovaks into one political entity.
- The Slovaks, on the other hand, had no forum for political expression within Hungary, and their national revival was less marked. Slovakia was not industrialized until the end of the nineteenth century, meaning the Slovaks remained mostly rural people led by a small group of intellectuals. After the creation of the dual Austro-Hungarian monarchy in 1867, a strong national revival began in Hungary, severely repressing that of the Slovak people. By the eve of World War I, the Slovaks were struggling to preserve their newly found national identity.

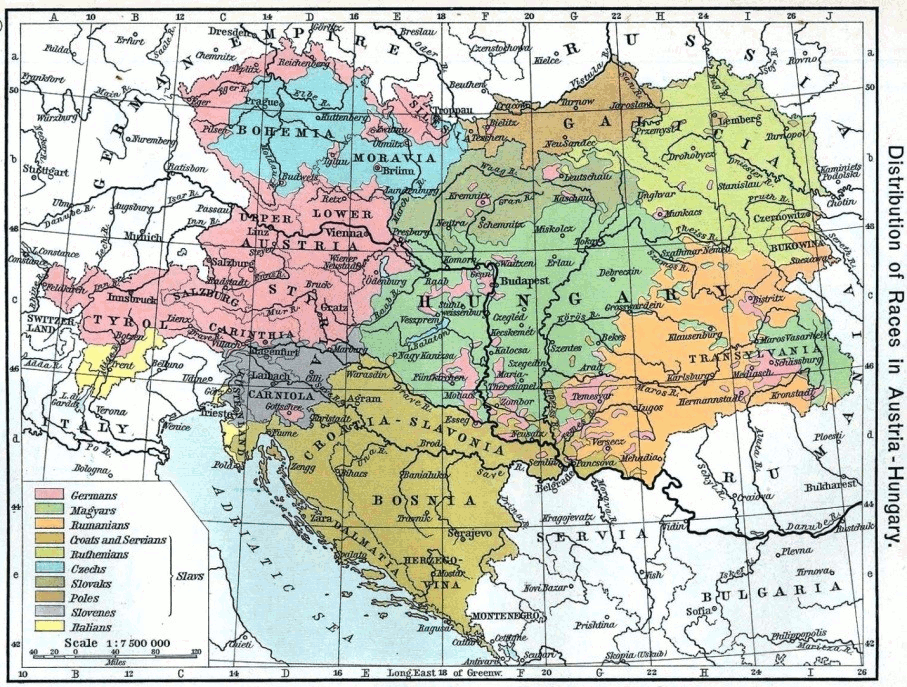
Czechoslovak lands inside Austria-Hungary, 1911: Czechs Slovaks Ruthenians (Ukrainians) Poles / Austrians/Germans Hungarians Romanians

Around the start of the 20th century, the idea of a "Czecho-Slovak" entity began to be advocated by some Czech and Slovak leaders. In the 1890s, contacts between Czech and Slovak intellectuals intensified. The Czech leader Masaryk was a keen advocate of Czech-Slovak cooperation. Some of his students formed the Czechoslovak Union and in 1898 published the journal Hlas ("The Voice"). In Slovakia, young Slovak intellectuals began to challenge the old Slovak National Party. But although the Czech and Slovak national movements began drawing closer together, their ultimate goals remained unclear. At least until World War I, the Czech and Slovak national movements struggled for autonomy within Austria and Hungary, respectively. Only during the war did the idea of an independent Czecho-Slovakia emerge.

== World War I (1914–1918) ==
At the outbreak of World War I, the Czechs and Slovaks showed little enthusiasm for fighting for their perceived respective enemies, the Germans, the Austrians and the Hungarians, against fellow Slavs, the Russians and the Serbs. Large numbers of Czechs and Slovaks defected on the Russo-Polish front and formed the Czechoslovak Legion, organised by Milan Rastislav Štefánik (a Slovak astronomer and general of the French army). Masaryk went to Western Europe and began propagating the idea that the Austro-Hungarian Empire should be dismembered and that Czechoslovakia should be an independent state. In 1916, together with Edvard Beneš and Milan Rastislav Štefánik, Masaryk created the Czechoslovak National Council. Masaryk in the United States, Štefánik in France, and Beneš in France and Britain then worked to gain Allied recognition. When secret talks between the Allies and Austrian emperor Charles I collapsed, the Allies recognized the Czechoslovak National Council in the summer of 1918 as the supreme organ of a future Czechoslovak government.

On 22 October 1915, Czech and Slovak representatives in the United States signed the Cleveland Agreement endorsing an independent Czech and Slovak federation with national autonomy for the Slovak people. This was followed by the Pittsburgh Agreement, signed on 31 May 1918 (Masaryk signed this on 30 May). The latter envisioned a plan for a unified Czecho-Slovak state in which Slovakia would have its own assembly. In early October 1918, Germany and Austria proposed peace negotiations. On 18 October, while in the United States, Masaryk issued a declaration of Czechoslovak independence. Masaryk insisted that the new Czechoslovak state include the historic Bohemian Kingdom, containing the German-populated borderland. On 21 October, however, German deputies from Bohemia joined other German and Austrian deputies in the Austrian parliament in declaring an independent German-Austrian state. Following the abdication of Charles I on 11 November, Czech troops took control of borderlands.

Hungary withdrew from the Habsburg Empire on 1 November. The new liberal-democratic government of Hungary under Count Mihály Károlyi attempted to retain Slovakia. With Allied approval, the Czechs occupied Slovakia, and the Hungarians were forced to withdraw. The Czechs and Allies agreed on the Danube and Ipeľ rivers as the boundary between Hungary and Slovakia; a large Hungarian minority, occupying the fertile plain of the Danube, would be included in the new state.

== See also ==
- Congress of Oppressed Nationalities of the Austro-Hungarian Empire
