= Mykola Vasylko =

Ukrainian diplomat

- Микола Василько
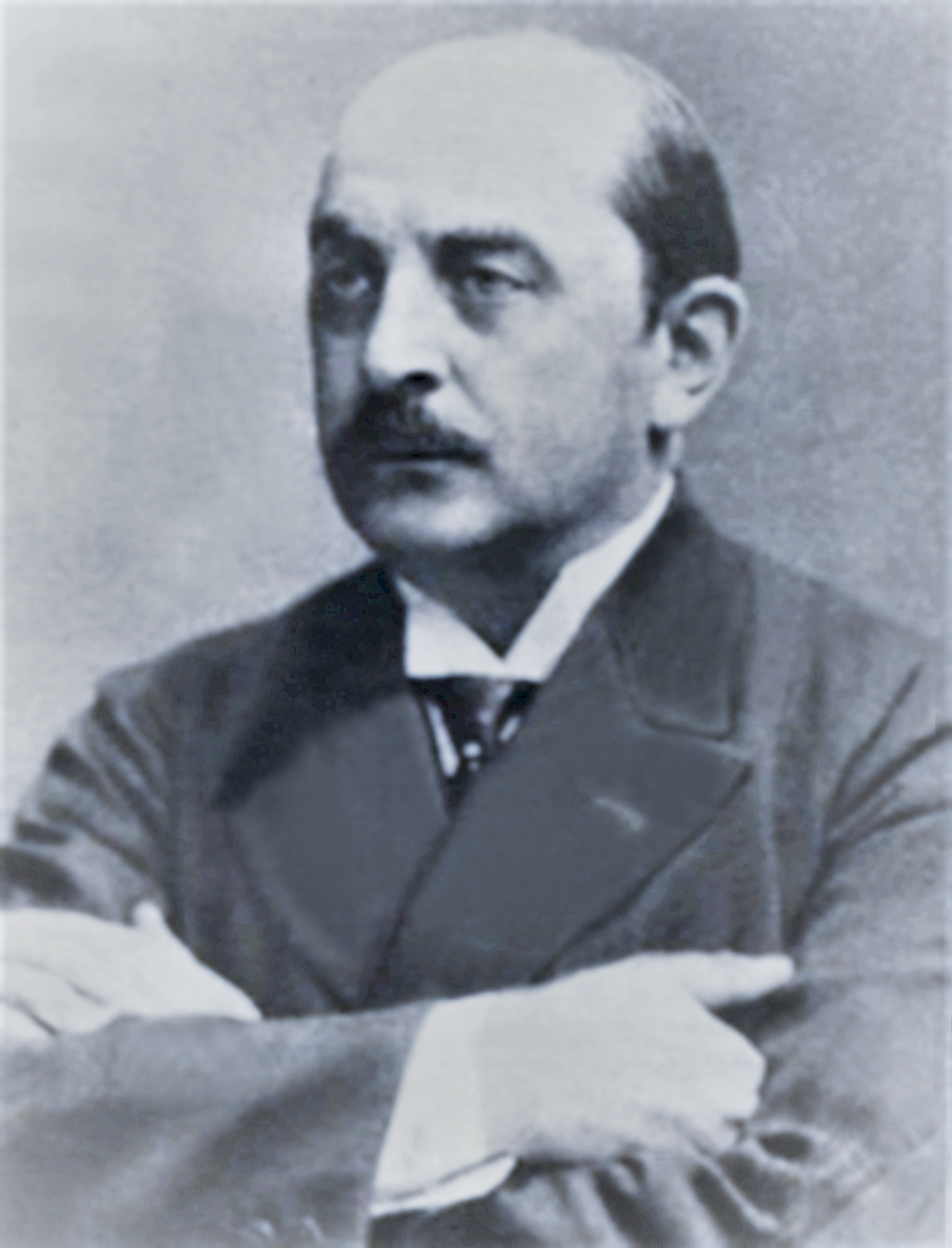
- Wassilko in 1915

Ambassador of the Ukrainian People's Republic to Germany (chargé d'affaires)
- In office 19 November 1919 – 1924

Ambassador of the Ukrainian People's Republic to Switzerland
- In office 1919–1923
- President: Symon Petliura (Chief Otaman)
- Preceded by: Yevmen Lukasevych
- Succeeded by: Zenon Kurbas (chargé d'affaires)

Member of the Imperial Council
- In office 1899–1918

Personal details
- Born: Nikolaus Wassilko von Serecki; March 25, 1868 Slobodzia-Komarivtsi, Storozhynets district, Duchy of Bukovina, Austria-Hungary (now Lukavtsi, Vyzhnytsia Raion, Chernivtsi Oblast, Ukraine)
- Died: August 2, 1924 (aged 56) Bad Reichenhall, Bavaria, Weimar Republic (now Germany)
- Resting place: Tegel Orthodox Cemetery, Berlin
- Spouse(s): Olga Gergely (died); Gerda Walden
- Children: 4
- Education: Theresianum (1887); University of Czernowitz
- Occupation: Landowner, politician, diplomat

Nikolaus Ritter von Wassilko (Ukrainian: Микола Миколайович Василько, romanized: Mykola Mykolayovych Vasylko; 25 March 1868 – 2 August 1924) was a Bukovinian aristocrat and politician, who led the region's Ukrainian community during the period of Austrian rule and later served as a diplomat of the Ukrainian People's Republic. A controversial personality during his political career, Wassilko came to be posthumously recognized as an important figure in the Ukrainian movement for national independence.

== Biography ==
=== Ancestry and early life ===
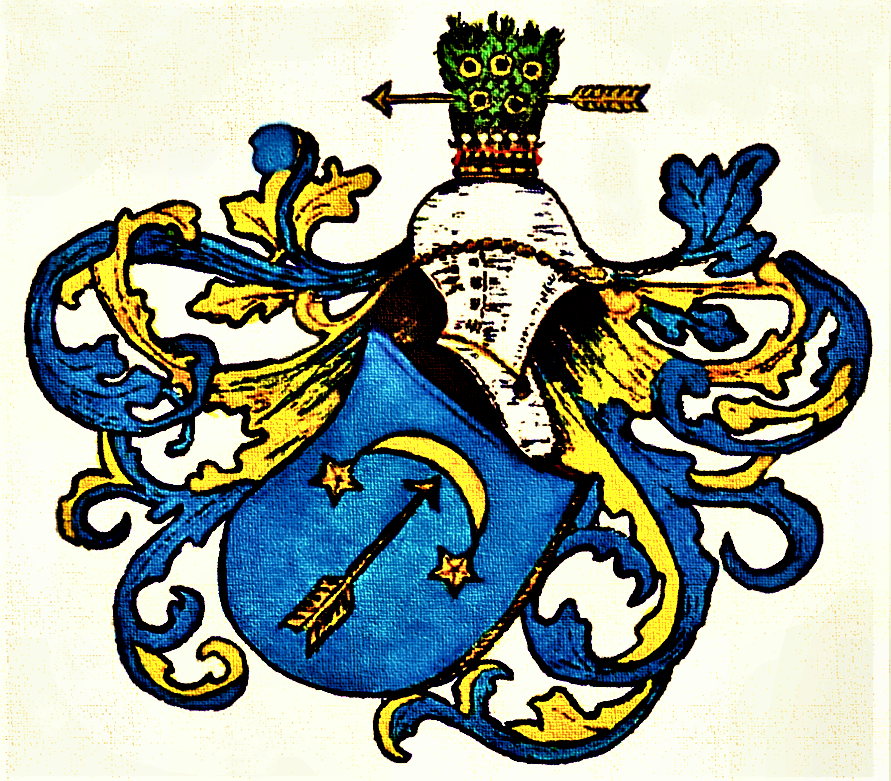
Coat of arms of the Wassilko family

Wassilko stemmed from an old boyar family of the Principality of Moldavia, which claimed descent from 11th-century Rus' prince Vasilko Rostislavich of Peremyshl. As a result of their participation in the 1673 Battle of Khotyn, in 1676 members of the family were awarded baronial titles by the Polish king. In 1855 that title was confirmed by Austrian emperor Franz Joseph I. In 1918 his successor Karl I promoted the family to the title of counts.

Nikolaus, affectionally known among his relatives as Coco, was born on 25 March 1868 in the village of Slobodzia-Komarivtsi (now Lukavtsi, Vyzhnytsia Raion) near Berehomet, the main residence of his family. His father Nikolaus Wassilko (Mykola Vasylko) was a member of the Bukovinian Diet, a Romanian patriot, founding member of the Society for Romanian Culture and Literature in Bukovina, and a notable magnate landowner. Until the age of 10, he was homeschooled under the supervision of his mother, Eugenia Naumann. Afterwards, Wassilko was sent by his parents to study in Vienna's Theresianum, a prestigious school for noble youths, which produced many notable officials and diplomats. Thanks to his education, he could speak Romanian, German, Ukrainian, French, English, and also had a good knowledge of Latin and Greek.

The Wassilkos were of Eastern Orthodox faith. However, the archives of the Austrian Parliament list him as being a Greek Catholic.

=== Inheritance and start of political career ===
After graduating in 1887, Wassilko spent one year as a serviceman of the 16th Hussar Regiment stationed in Czernowitz (modern Chernivtsi, Ukraine), and then entered the University of Czernowitz, studying law. Following the death of his parents, 23-year-old Nikolaus inherited their lands in his native village. Having identified himself as a Romanian during his youth, Wassilko developed sympathies to the national aspirations of Ruthenians or Ukrainians, who composed the majority of population under his administration. He promoted services in the Ukrainian language in the local church and replaced the local priest, an ethnic Romanian, with a Ukrainian from a neighbouring village. After marrying, Wassilko sold his lands in Slobodzia-Komarivtsi and purchased an estate in the village of Verkhnii Lukavets (now Lukavtsi), where he was elected starost. As his new holding was dominated by Ukrainians, Wassilko introduced Ukrainian as the language of local administration and himself took Ukrainian lessons from a local teacher. Due to this, he became an outcast for the Bukovina Romanians. Social-democratic politician George Grigorovici called him a "renegade", telling him in a parliamentary debate that "Being Romanian is an honor".

Initially, he didn't speak Ukrainian at all and had to learn a few phrases for the elections. In 1892, along with Ivan Tyminskyi, Wassilko joined the Moscophiles, seeing them as a counterweight to Ukrainian and Romanian national movements in the region. In 1895 he established a reading hall in his village. Two years later, members of the conservative Ruthenian party promoted Wassilko as their candidate for the Imperial Council. However, his candidacy was declined due to him not having reached the age of 30, which was one of the requirements for members of parliament at the time. During that period, Wassilko promoted a conciliatory line between Ukrainians and Romanians, supporting cooperation between both communities. He eventually campaigned for his political ally Basil von Wolan who would get elected to the Austrian parliament. Wassilko also served as a patron of education in Bukovina, supporting the Ruska Besida society and providing financing for the construction of schools and churches.

=== Parliamentary activities ===
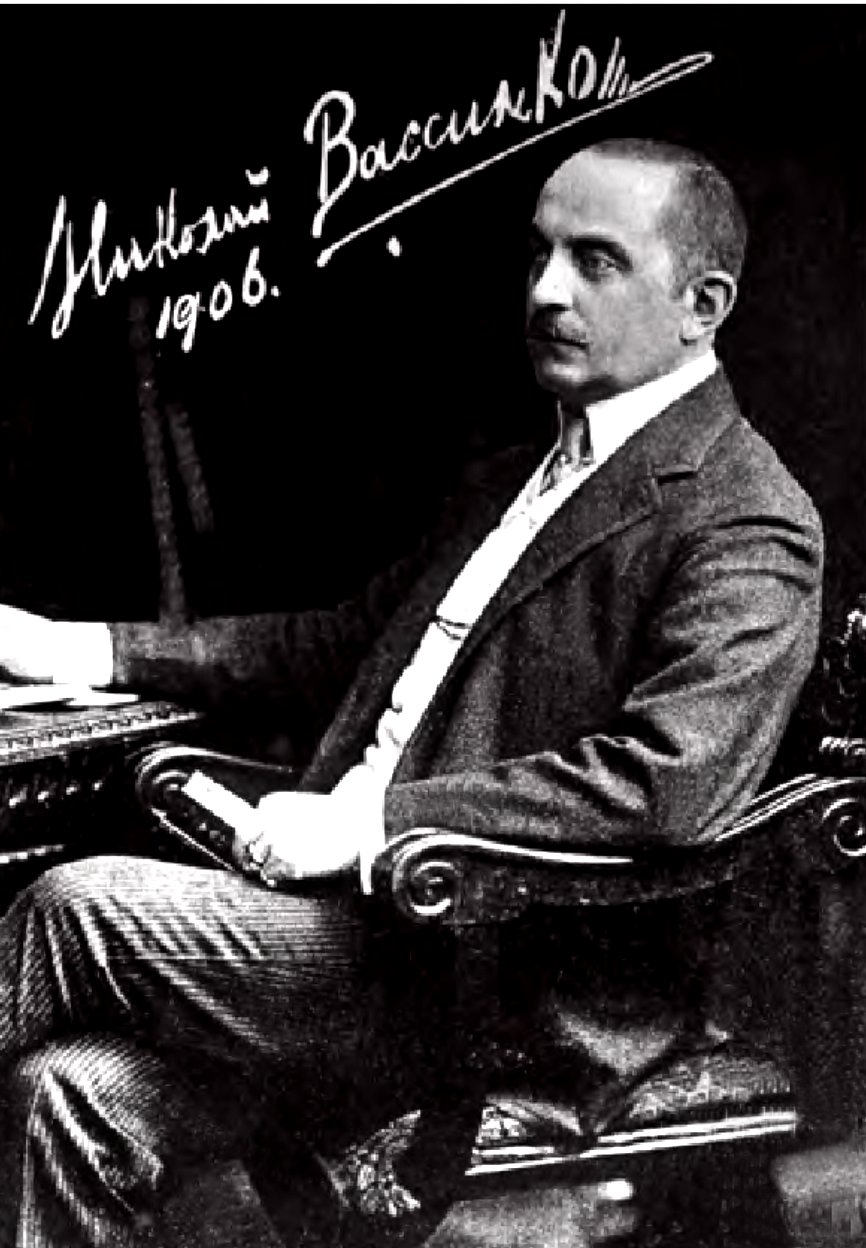
Wassilko as a member of Austrian parliament in 1906

In 1898 Wassilko was elected to the regional diet of Bukovina. He delivered his inaugural speech in the Ukrainian language. As a member of local parliament, he proposed a plan of dividing the consistory of Metropolitans of Bukovina in two sections based on ethnicity, and promoted the idea of appointing the bishops of Czernowitz alternately from among Romanian and Ukrainian clerics. Following the death of Wolan in 1899, Wassilko took his place after being elected to the Imperial Council. On that position he promoted the unification of Moscophiles and Ukrainophiles, but eventually took the side of the latter due to opposition of German and Romanian parliamentarians to his activities. Wassilko's adoption of Ukrainophile positions in 1902 was described as a great victory for the Ukrainian national movement in a report of the Russian consul in Czernowitz to Saint Petersburg. In a speech in the Reichsrat on March 1, 1900, he said that "Bukovina is Slavic land and it shall remain Slavic forever".

In 1903, along with representatives of the Romanian and Jewish communities, Wassilko created a parliamentary group known as the "Freethinking Union" in the Bukovinian Diet. The group promoted the reform of electoral law in order to remove oligarch landowners from power in the region. Wassilko and his allies achieved the removal of Landespräsident Friedrich Freiherr Bourguignon von Baumberg and his replacement with Prince Konrad of Hohenlohe-Schillingsfürst. In 1908, he supported the opening of a Ukrainian gymnasium in Vyzhnytsia, which attracted many Hutsul pupils from nearby Galicia. During his career, Wassilko received the title of honorary citizen from 76 communities in Bukovina, including the cities of Czernowitz, Storozhynets, Vyzhnytisa and Kitsman.

Between 1905 and 1907 Wassilko worked on the creation of a new electoral law for Galicia and Bukovina, alongside Benno Straucher, Stepan Smal-Stotsky, Aurel Onciul and his cousin, Georg Wassilko von Serecki. As a result of its adoption, in 1907 Ukrainian parties were able to have 33 representatives elected to the regional parliaments of both lands, and formed their own political group, the "Ukrainian Club", in Vienna, with Wassilko serving as its deputy head. In 1911 a similar club was established in the Bukovinian Diet. As member of the Imperial Council, Wassilko promoted the cause of establishing a Ukrainian university in Lviv, supported agrarian strikes and promoted the idea of creating a separate crown land from Ukrainian-populated areas of Eastern Galicia and Northern Bukovina. On the initiative of Austrian authorities, he also led the suppression of Moscophile societies in Bukovina, declaring in 1909 that the movement's activities in Galicia and Bukovina had been eradicated.

=== World War I ===
With the start of World War I, Wassilko used his connections and influence in Vienna to organize help for Ukrainian refugees from Galicia and Bukovina. In late 1914, he took part in the creation of a volunteer Ukrainian unit in Bukovina under command of colonel Eduard Fischer. Wassilko himself organized peasant militias in the area of Vyzhnytsia, which helped to stop Russian troops on the Siret river and aided Austrian forces in liberating the outskirts of Czernowitz. Established in 1915–1916, those volunteer units became known as the Hutsul-Bukovina Kurin and served as part of the Austrian army.

Wassilko also took part in the creation of the Main Ukrainian Council headed by Kost Levytsky, whose representatives took the side of Austria-Hungary in the ongoing war, and supported the cause of establishing an independent Ukrainian state in lands under the rule of Russia. In 1915 he became a co-founder of the General Ukrainian Council in Vienna. He worked to achieve the official replacement of the ethnonym "Ruthenian" with "Ukrainian", as a result of which in August 1917 emperor Karl I recognized the name of Ukrainians on the government level. However, following the 1916 agreement between Austria-Hungary and Germany, which recognized Polish national claims at the cost of Ukrainians, both Wassilko and Levytsky resigned from their posts in the Ukrainian Club as a sign of protest. After the February Revolution in Russia, Wassilko criticized the Austrian government for postponing plans for a wider autonomy of Galicia, which contrasted with the attention of the Provisional Government to the Ukrainian cause during the same period.

=== Struggle against the union of Bukovina with Romania ===
On 6 November 1918, an agreement was signed between the Ukrainian national commissioner Omelian Popowicz and the self-proclaimed Romanian national commissioner Aurel Onciul regarding the partition of Bukovina between the new Ukrainian state and a non-existent Romanian government. Although Onciul lacked the mandate to sign this agreement, as he was not authorized to do so by the Romanian National Council of Bukovina (the political body representing the interests of Bukovinian Romanians), the self-proclaimed Ukrainian government ordered the occupation of the Administrative Palace in Czernowitz by Ukrainian militias. A delegation of the Ukrainian National Rada, consisting of deputies Ilya Semaka and Mykola Spenul, along with Omelian Popowicz and Ilko Popowicz, summoned the Austrian governor Josef Graf von Ezdorf to surrender administrative power in the Ukrainian territories of Bukovina, as well as in the city of Czernowitz, to the Ukrainian National Rada. The governor yielded to force (the palace already being occupied by Ukrainian militias) and signed an official protocol transferring administrative authority in Bukovina to Omelian Popowicz and Aurel Onciul.

The Romanian National Council refused to recognize the document signed by Onciul, opposed the partition of Bukovina's territory, and—amid Ukrainian troops beginning to occupy buildings in Cernăuți—requested military assistance from the Romanian government to maintain order and protect the lives of citizens. On 9 November 1918, the Romanian 8th Infantry Division, commanded by General Iacob Zadik, entered Bukovina "to protect the lives, property, and freedom of the inhabitants of every ethnicity and faith against bands of criminals who have begun their work of destruction" (as stated in General Zadik's proclamation addressed to the Bukovinians), and on 11 November entered Cernăuți, driving out the armed Ukrainian bands. On 15/28 November 1918, the General Congress of Bukovina – composed of representatives of the Romanians, Germans, and Poles, while the Jews and Ukrainians declined the invitation – voted for the Union of Bukovina with Romania.

Let the Romanians not believe that King Ferdinand will ever rule the whole of Bukovina!

— Mykola Vasylko, in 1918

=== In Ukrainian diplomatic service ===
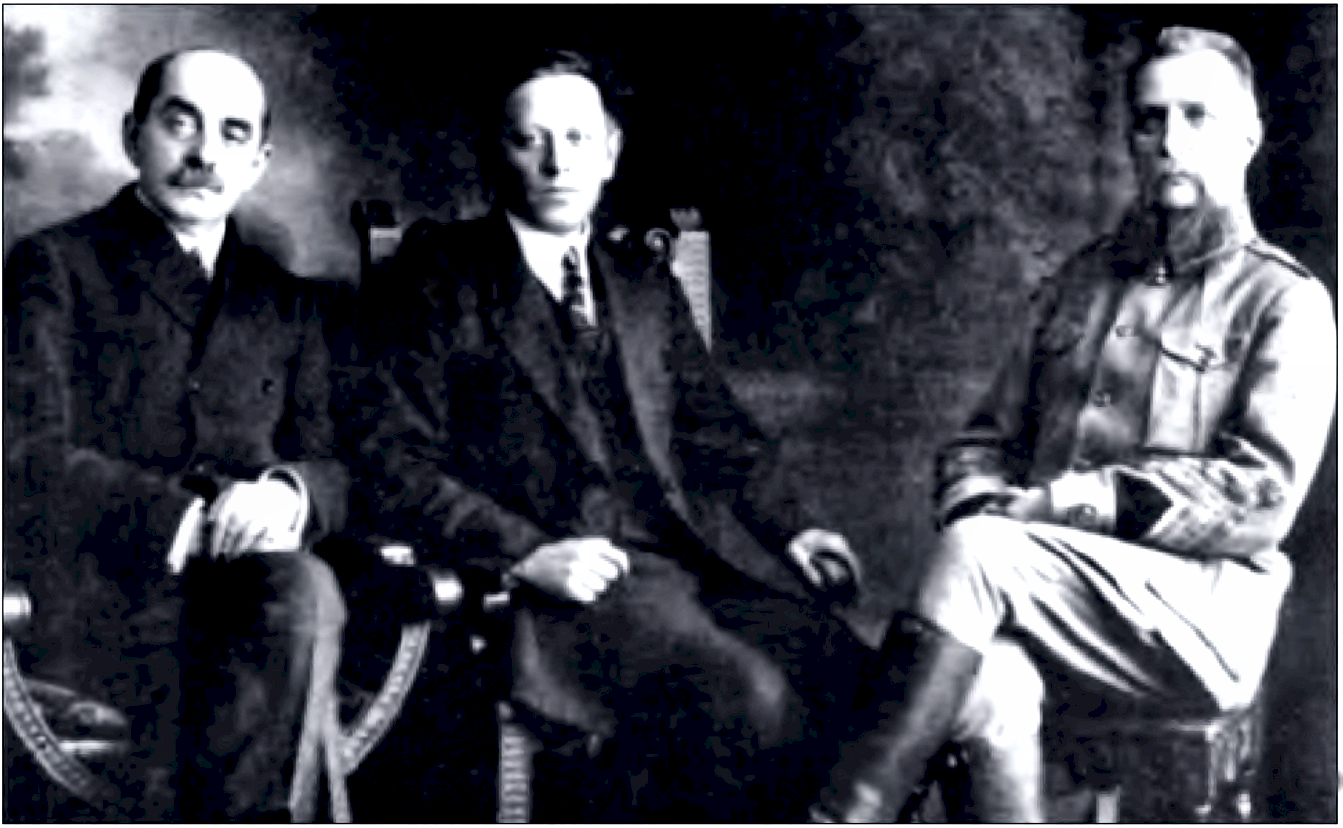
Wassilko (left) during a meeting with Ukrainian leader Symon Petliura (center) in 1919

Following the establishment of the Central Rada in Kyiv, Wassilko became the representative of its government, the General Secretariat, in the Austrian parliament. He promoted the idea of separating Volhynia and Podolia from the Russian Empire and reestablishing the Kingdom of Galicia-Volhynia as a Ukrainian national autonomy inside of the Habsburg Monarchy in case of a Central Powers victory. In 1917–1918 Wassilko represented the Ukrainian People's Republic at the peace talks in Brest-Litovsk. Thanks to his intervention, a secret protocol was signed, according to which Austria-Hungary promised to unify Eastern Galicia and Northern Bukovina into a single crown land. However, under the pressure from Poles, the imperial government was forced to abandon that project.

In late 1918, Wassilko became a member of the Ukrainian National Council, which served as an interim parliament of the newly proclaimed West Ukrainian People's Republic. In November 1918 he was appointed the republic's ambassador to Austria. On this post, he managed to provide the young state with loans necessary for fighting the ongoing Polish-Ukrainian War. In 1919 Wassilko headed the Ukrainian embassy in Switzerland, establishing ties with representatives of Poland, Romania and Czechoslovakia. Due to the lack of government financing, he had to spend 100,000 francs of own costs to finance the embassy's activities. Using his contacts in Vienna, he was able to unblock 300 millions of kronen, which had been kept on accounts of the Ukrainian People's Republic.

On 19 November 1919 Wassilko was appointed ambassador of Ukraine in Berlin. On the advice of Yosyp Bezpalko, in 1920 Chief Otaman Symon Petliura also made him responsible for the operation of Ukrainian embassies in Italy and Hungary. Wassilko praised the Polish-Ukrainian Treaty of Warsaw, but issued concern that it would be seen by the Polish side as a situational alliance, leading to the reemergence of conflict between both nations. With the financial situation of the Ukrainian government growing worse, Wassilko was forced to engage in trade of tea, clothes and other items in order to finance his diplomatic activities, later delivering a detailed report on all expenses to the authorities. Among figures who received his financial help were Volodymyr Vynnychenko, Yevhen Chykalenko, Pavlo Chyzhevskyi and even Symon Petliura himself. It was Wassilko who offered Petliura to move his activities in exile to Paris.

== Personal life and death ==
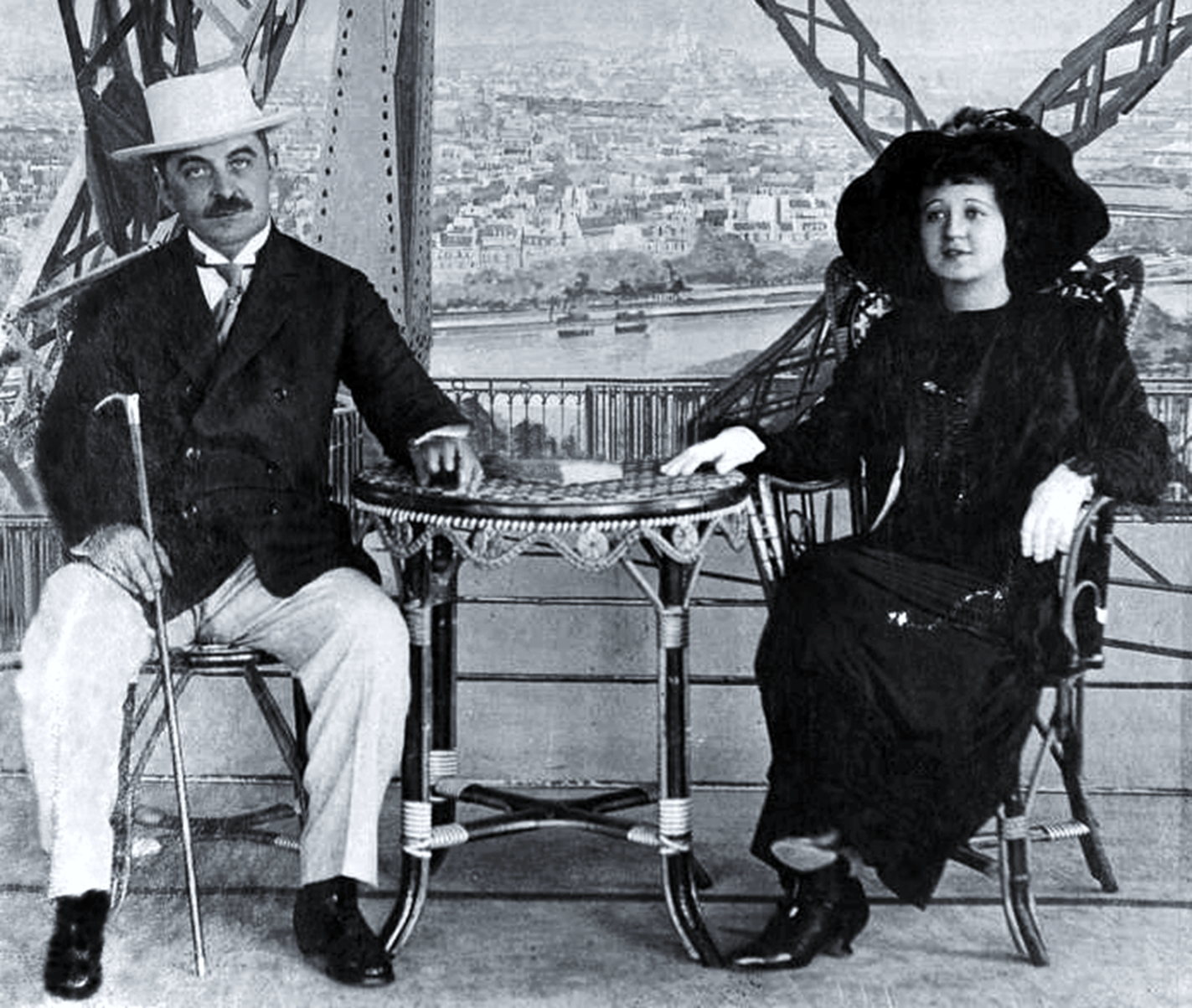
Wassilko and his second wife Gerda Walden in Paris, 1910

Wassilko was married to Olga Gergely, a member of an old noble family. The couple had four children: Hamilkar-Nikolaus (born 1894), Vira (1896), Tetiana (1897) and Nadia (1899). After Olga's death, Wassilko was left with their three younger children and later remarried to Gerda Walden, a notable actress from Vienna.

Nikolaus von Wassilko died on 2 August 1924 in the resort town of Bad Reichenhall, Bavaria, following an attack of asthma. He was buried at the Eastern Orthodox cemetery in the Berlin neighbourhood of Tegel.

== Legacy ==
Treated with suspicion by many Ukrainians due to his Romanian ancestry and noble background, after his death Wassilko came to be widely recognized as a talented politician and an important figure of the Ukrainian national movement. His grave in Berlin was long neglected, but has since been rediscovered, with one of the members of the Ukrainian parliament fincancing its upkeep.

Among the Ukrainians, he is held in low regard. Romanian historian Teodor Bălan called him "an intriguer, opportunist and a sad figure in the history of Bukovina".

In the newspaper Bukowinaer Rundschau of 24 December 1899 (which was known for not being pro-Romanian), a scathing character study can be read on page 2 under the heading "Am Ziele" regarding his motives for changing his political stance and even denying his ethnic origins, transforming himself from a descendant of the old Romanian Vasilco/Wassilko family, named Nicolae, into Nikolaj and later into Mykola.
