= Historical regions of Romania =

Historical regions of Romania Regiunile istorice ale României (Romanian)
- Location: Romania
- Number: 9
- Subdivisions: Counties

The historical regions of Romania are located in Central, Southeastern, and Eastern Europe. Romania came into being through the unification of two principalities, Wallachia and Moldova in 1859. The new unitary state extended over further regions at various times during the late 19th and 20th centuries, including Dobruja in 1878, and Transylvania in 1918.

These regions are part of Romania today:

Wallachia (united with Moldavia in 1859 to create modern Romania):

- Muntenia (Greater Wallachia);
- Oltenia (Lesser Wallachia): the territory between the rivers Danube and Olt and the Southern Carpathians became part of the Principality of Wallachia in the early 14th century.

Moldavia (united with Wallachia in 1859 to create modern Romania):

- Western Moldavia: in today's form part of Romania since 1944;
- Southern Bukovina: following the union with Romania in 1918 (initially, the entire region of Bukovina was part of Romania, until World War II).

Dobruja:

- Northern Dobruja: in Romania since 1878 (with the exception of some Danubian islands and Snake Island, which were incorporated into the Soviet Union in 1948, and became part of Ukraine in 1991).

Wallachia, western Moldova, and Dobruja are sometimes referred collectively as the Regat (The Kingdom), as they formed the Romanian "Old" Kingdom before World War I.

Transylvania (the term sometimes encompasses not only Transylvania proper, but also part of the historical regions of Crișana, Maramureș, and Banat. The new borders were set by the Treaty of Trianon in 1920 between the respective states):

- Transylvania proper: following the declaration of the union with Romania in 1918;
- Banat: since 1918 claimed and eventually divided between Romania, Kingdom of Serbs, Croats and Slovenes (today Serbia) and Hungary;
- Crișana: the region bordered by the rivers Mureș and Someș and the Apuseni Mountains, following the declaration of the union in 1918, eventually divided between Hungary and Romania;
- Southern Maramureș: part of the mountainous northwestern region, following the declaration of the union in 1918, eventually divided between Czechoslovakia and Romania (today, Northern Maramureș is part of Ukraine).

Between 1918 and 1920, during the Revolutions and interventions in Hungary, the Hungarian–Romanian War affected also part of these territories until the final resolution of state affairs by the Paris Peace Conference.

Administrative map of Romania in 1930

These regions and territories were part of Romania in the past:

Bessarabia: this territory was part (as the eastern half) of Moldova until 1812, when it was incorporated into the Russian Empire. The entire region became part of Romania from 1918 to 1940 when it was occupied by the Soviets. Romania managed to annex it again in 1941, but lost it back in 1944, during World War II.

- Southern Bessarabia (including a part of Budjak): in 1856, the southern part of Bessarabia was returned to Moldova, which united with Wallachia in 1859 to create modern Romania. In 1878, Romania was pressured into exchanging this territory for the Dobruja, and Russian rule was restored over it.

Northern Bukovina: the region was part of Romania from 1918 to 1940 when it was occupied by the Soviets; Romania managed to annex it again in 1941, but lost it in 1944. Today it is part of the Chernivtsi Oblast in Ukraine.

Hertsa region: a territory of Moldova, it was part of Romania from 1859 to 1940, when it was occupied by the Soviets; Romania managed to annex it again in 1941, but lost it in 1944. Today it is part of the Chernivtsi Oblast in Ukraine.

Southern Dobruja: was annexed from Bulgaria in 1913, after the Second Balkan War. It became Bulgarian again after 1940.

Snake Island: an island located in the Black Sea, that was part of Romania between 1878 and 1948.

Principality of Moldova during the reign of Stephen the Great

Others:

- Transnistria: controlled by Romania from 1941 to 1944 as the Transnistria Governorate (Romania did not formally incorporate Transnistria into its administrative framework).
- Pokuttia: controlled for around a century and a half with interruptions by the Romanian principality of Moldova. The region was occupied by Romania for several months in 1919.

Ethnographic areas:

- Székely Land
- Csángó Land

== See also ==
- Counties of Romania
- Development regions of Romania
- Greater Romania

== General cited references ==
- Treptow, Kurt W.; Popa, Marcel (1996). Historical Dictionary of Romania. Scarecrow Press, Inc. ISBN 0-8108-3179-1.
