= Switzerland–Ukraine relations =

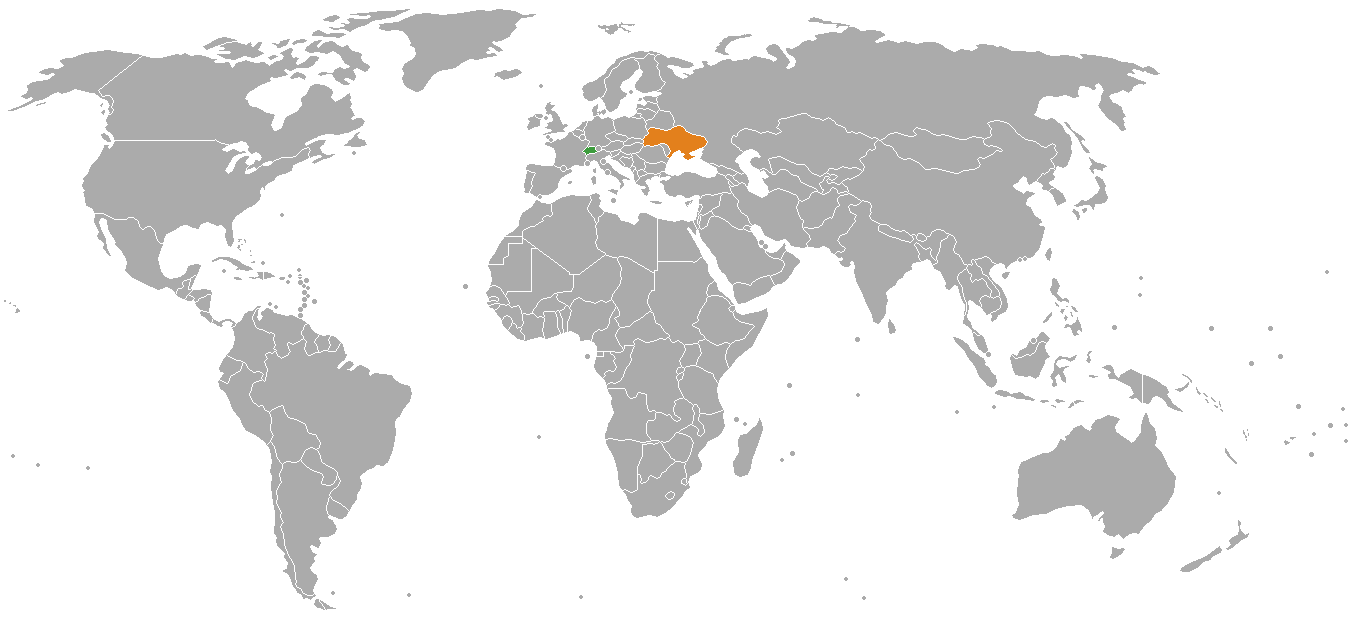
- Switzerland: Ukraine

Switzerland–Ukraine relations refers to the bilateral relations between the Swiss Confederation and Ukraine. Diplomatic relations between Switzerland and Ukraine were officially established in February 1992, following the recognition of Ukraine as an independent state by the Swiss government on 23 December 1991. In February 1993 the Embassy of Ukraine in Switzerland was opened.

Previously, a Swiss consulate functioned in Kyiv starting from 1902 and into the Hetmanate era, and in 1918 diplomatic missions of the Ukrainian State and Ukrainian People's Republic worked in Switzerland, operating consulates in Lausanne, Zurich and Bern. In 1918 a Swiss-Ukrainian chamber of commerce was established in Geneva.

Today, Switzerland and Ukraine cooperate in the sphere of humanitarian aid, demining, reconstruction and support of communities affected by the Russo-Ukrainian war.

== List of diplomatic representatives ==
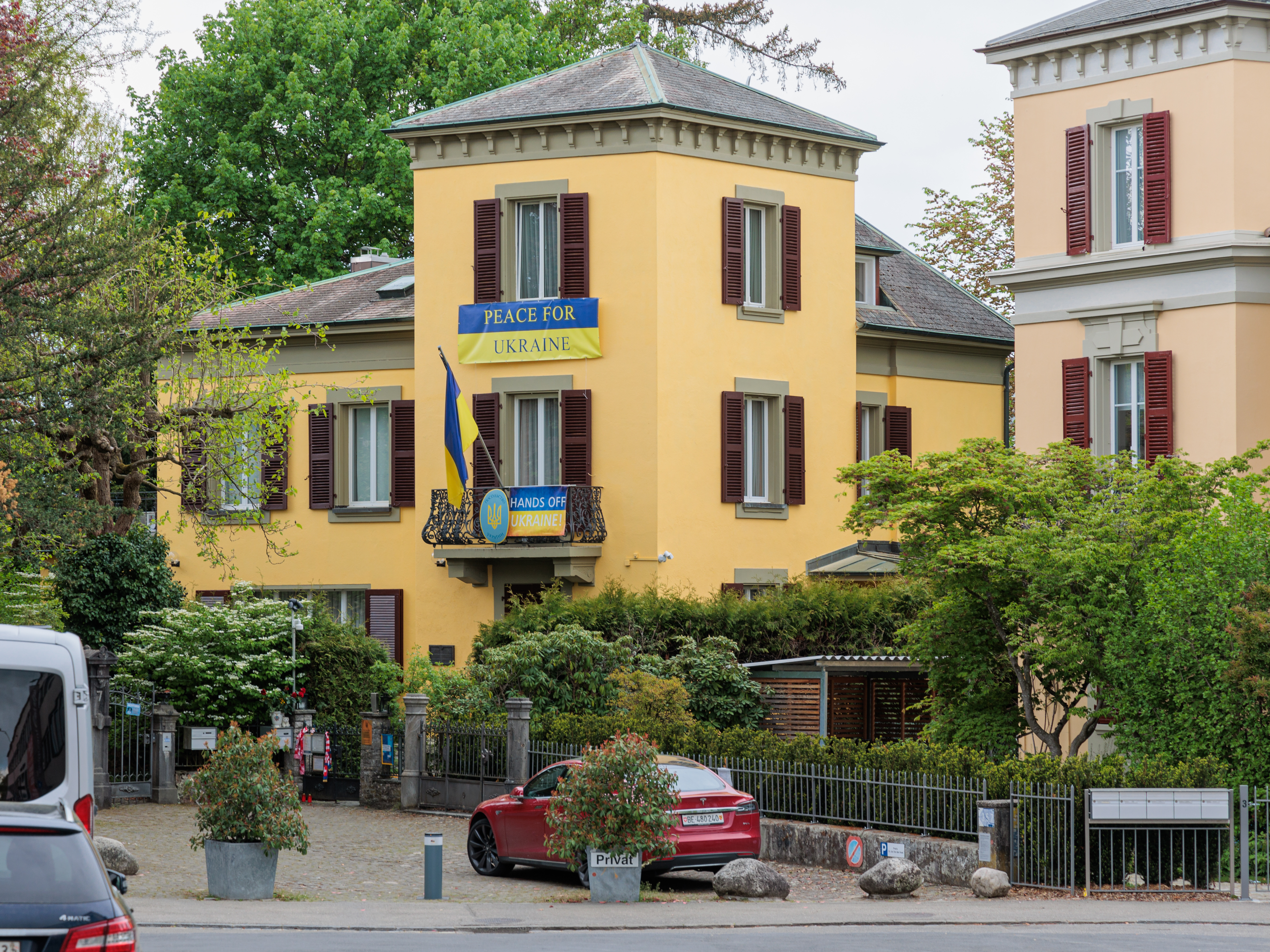
Ukrainian Embassy in Bern, Switzerland

=== Ambassadors of Ukraine in Switzerland ===
==== Ukrainian State and Ukrainian People's Republic ====
- Yevmen Lukasevych (1918–1919)
- Mykola Vasylko (1919–1923)
- Zenon Kurbas (chargé d'affaires, 1923–1926)

==== Ukraine ====
- Andrii Ozadovskyi (chargé d'affaires, 1992–1993)
- Oleksandr Slipchenko (1992–1997)
- Nina Kovalska (1998–2000)
- Yevhen Bersheda (2000–2003)
- Suzanna Stanik (2003–2004)
- Ostap Yukhymovych (chargé d'affaires, 2004–2008)
- Ihor Dir (2008–2014)
- Artem Rybchenko (2018–2022)
- Iryna Venediktova (since 2022)

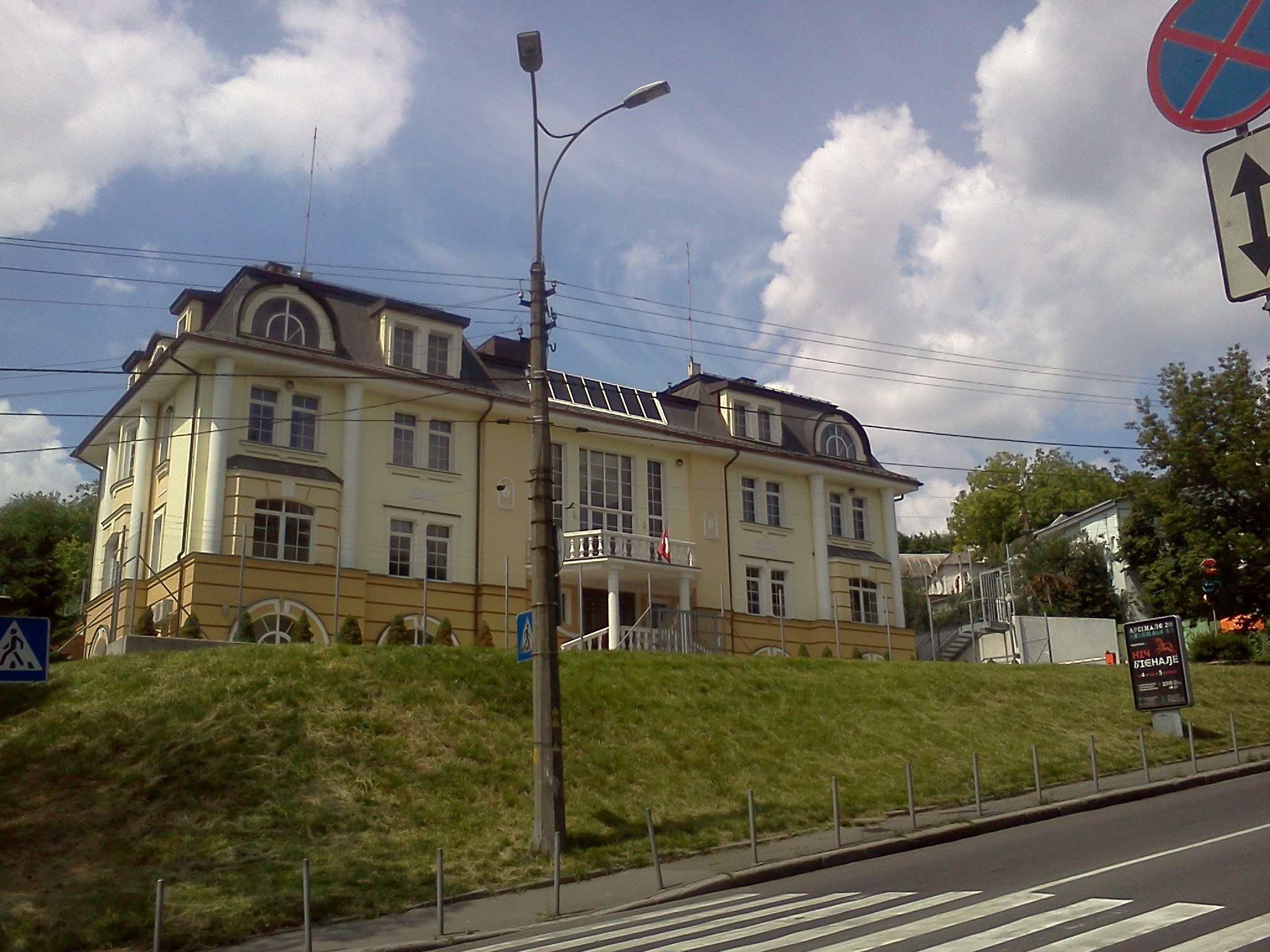
Embassy of Switzerland in Kyiv

=== Ambassadors of Switzerland in Ukraine ===
- Anna Barbara Bauty (chargé d'affaires, 1992–1993)
- Armin Kammer (1993–1996)
- Sylvia Pauli (1996–1999)
- Jean-François Kammer (2000–2007)
- George Zubler (2007–2011)
- Christian Schoenenberger (2011–2015)
- Guillaume Scheurer (2015–2019)
- Claude Wild (2019–2023)
- Félix Baumann (since 2023)
