= Ed Fischer =

Ed Fischer may refer to:

- Edmond H. Fischer (1920–2021), American-Swiss biochemist
- Edward F. Fischer, professor of anthropology at Vanderbilt University

== See also ==
- Eduard Fischer (disambiguation)
- Ed Fisher (disambiguation)
