= Ed Fisher =

Ed or Eddie Fisher may refer to:

== Sports ==
- Ed Fisher (baseball) (1876–1951), American baseball pitcher in 1902
- Eddie Fisher (baseball) (1936–2025), American baseball pitcher in 1960s and '70s
- Ed Fisher (American football) (born 1949), American football player

== Others ==
- Eddie Fisher (drummer) (born 1973), American drummer
- Eddie Fisher (1928–2010), American singer

== See also ==
- Ed Fischer (disambiguation)
- Edward Fisher (disambiguation)
- Edwin Fisher (disambiguation)
