= Brătulești =

Brătulești may refer to several villages in Romania:

- Brătulești, a village in Corod Commune, Galați County
- Brătulești, a village in Strunga Commune, Iași County
- Brătulești, a former village in Periș Commune, Ilfov County
