= Peter Mancina =

Peter Anthony Mancina is a Research Associate at the University of Oxford Centre for Criminology and review editor of the Border Criminologies blog. He is an American cultural and political anthropologist, ethnographer, historian, writer, and labor union researcher who writes about sanctuary city politics, immigration, governmental power, policy, social movements, and culture.

== Biography ==
Mancina holds a Bachelor of Arts degree in Political Economy and Social Movements from The Evergreen State College, as well as a Master of Arts degree and a Ph.D in Anthropology from Vanderbilt University in Nashville, Tennessee, United States. Mancina is a former United States National Science Foundation grantee and Wenner-Gren Foundation grantee. From 2013-2017, Mancina was a Researcher for Service Employees International Union Local 1021 in San Francisco. In 2018 he became a Research Associate at the University of Oxford Center for Criminology and review editor for the Border Criminologies blog. Mancina is also well known for his social media activism to intervene in the public debate on sanctuary cities and regularly provides news and analysis on the topic to a Twitter following of over 25,000.

In the Fall of 2019, Mancina was a Fellow at the Swedish Collegium for Advanced Study in Uppsala, Sweden.

== Academic Work ==
As a graduate student in the Department of Anthropology at Vanderbilt University, Mancina was trained as a Mayanist under the supervision of cultural and economic anthropologist Edward F. Fischer and studied politics, social movements, and Maya culture in rural Tzeltal-Maya towns in Chiapas, Mexico. His first professional work examined the lives of Tzeltal-Maya migrants in San Francisco, California and returned migrants in Chiapas. This transnational work charted the effect of their migration and day labor incomes in the U.S. upon development and politics in their towns of origin in Mexico.

Mancina has conducted ethnographic field research and archival research on the creation and implementation of San Francisco, California's sanctuary city policies. This has included interviews with sanctuary movement leaders, organizers, activists, and public officials; and "participant observation" with sanctuary movement organizations and sanctuary city policy advocacy groups. Part of this work has included conducting research in San Francisco City Hall and working as a constituent services staff member for sanctuary city law author District Supervisor David Campos. In this capacity, his participant observation work has included assisting undocumented city residents in seeking city services in a manner which itself was governed by sanctuary city laws. His sanctuary city-focused research has also included assisting a coalition of immigrant-serving non-profits and legal organizations called the San Francisco Immigrant Rights Defense Committee, now renamed FREESF in drafting and advocating for sanctuary city laws. From this research, Mancina wrote a comprehensive history of San Francisco, California's sanctuary city laws.

Mancina has also been cited in media outlets covering sanctuary city and sanctuary state political and legal developments.

Mancina is heavily influenced by critical theory, continental philosophy, the work of Michel Foucault, governmentality studies, and anthropological work in subfields of political anthropology known as the "anthropology of the state" and the "anthropology of policy."

== Selected bibliography ==
- (2025). On the Side of ICE: Policing Immigrants in a Sanctuary State. NYU Press.
- (2019). “Sanctuary Cities and Sanctuary-Power: Governmental Strategy for a Borderless World.” In Reece Jones (ed.) Open Borders: The Case for Freedom of Movement. University of Georgia Press. ISBN 978-0-8203-5428-6
- (2016). “In the Spirit of Sanctuary: Sanctuary-City Policy Advocacy and the Production of Sanctuary-Power in San Francisco, California” Dissertation, Vanderbilt University Department of Anthropology.
- (2012). “The Birth of a Sanctuary City: A History of Governmental Sanctuary in San Francisco.” pp. 205–218 In Randy K. Lippert and Sean Rehaag (eds.) Sanctuary Practices in International Perspectives: Migration, Citizenship, and Social Movements. Milton Park and New York: Routledge. ISBN 9780203128947
- (2011). “Crisis-Management: Tzeltal-Maya Transnational Migration and the Foucauldian Apparatus” Dialectical Anthropology 35(2): 205-225. ISSN 1573-0786
