= Edward Fisher =

Edward Fisher may refer to:

- Edward Fisher (musician) (1848–1913), Canadian conductor, organist and founder of the Toronto Conservatory of Music
- Edward Fisher (engraver) (1730–1785), mezzotint engraver
- Edward Fisher (theologian) (fl. 1627–1655), English theological writer
- Edward Fisher (rower) (born 1992), English rower
- Edward Fredrick Fisher or Ed Fisher (1876–1951), American baseball player in 1902

== See also ==
- Edward F. Fischer, anthropology professor
- Ed Fisher (disambiguation)
- Eduard Fischer (disambiguation)
- Edmund Fisher (disambiguation)
- Edwin Fisher (disambiguation)
