= Embassy of Ukraine, Bern =

Embassy of Ukraine in Bern
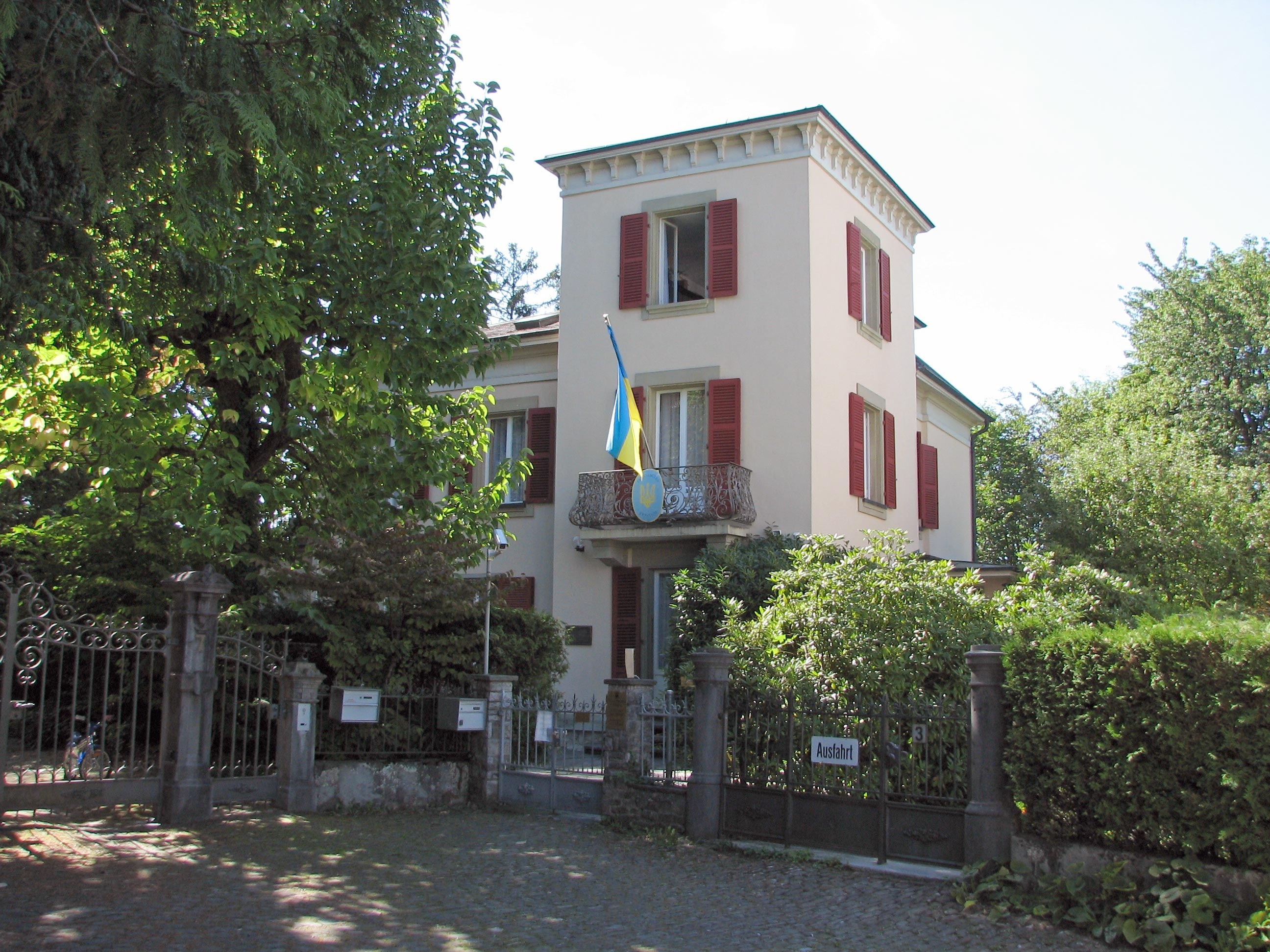
- Location: Bern, Switzerland
- Address: Feldeggweg 5, 3005 Bern, Switzerland
- Coordinates: 46°56′38″N 7°26′50″E
- Opened: 1993
- Ambassador: Iryna Venediktova
- Website: switzerland.mfa.gov.ua

The Ukrainian Embassy in Bern is the diplomatic mission of Ukraine to the Swiss Confederation and the Principality of Liechtenstein. Since 2022, Iryna Venediktova has been the ambassador.

== History ==
In 1918–1926, the Extraordinary Diplomatic Mission of the Ukrainian People's Republic operated in Bern. It began its work in August 1918 under Hetman P. Skoropadskyi, and from the end of November 1918 represented the interests of the government of the UPR Directory.

The first head of the Ukrainian mission was Yevmen Lukasevych (until early September 1919), and he was succeeded by Mykola Vasylko, who headed it until August 1923. After the latter's transfer as ambassador to Germany, Consul General Zenon Kurbas acted as its head from August 1923 until the mission was liquidated in 1926.

In 1999, the archival documents of the Mission were transferred to Ukraine.

In 2001, on the occasion of the 10th anniversary of Ukraine's independence, a plaque in honor of the Mission's activities was installed on the building of the Embassy of Ukraine in Bern.

After the restoration of Ukraine's independence, the Embassy of Ukraine in Switzerland was opened in February 1993.

== Ambassadors ==
Number	Date	Name	Image	Notes
1	1918	Yuri Hasenko		Ukrainian diplomat, political leader, and engineer. He was sent to Bern in 1917 on behalf of the Ukrainian People's Republic with the goal of spreading information about Ukraine. He founded a Ukrainian-Swiss commercial institution and a foreign institution of the Ukrainian People's Republic in Switzerland, and carried out diplomatic duties in Switzerland as a representative of Ukraine.
2	1918–1919	Yevmen Lukasevych		Ukrainian diplomat, journalist, doctor, publisher, and activist; Minister of Health of the Ukrainian People's Republic. From 1918, he was an adviser to the Ministry of Foreign Affairs of the UPR. He was sent to Bern to attempt to establish formal diplomatic ties between the Ukrainian People's Republic and Switzerland. He aided in the publishing of French-language literature about Ukraine in Bern and Lausanne.
3	1919–1923	Mykola Vasylko		Ukrainian diplomat of Romanian ancestry. He was the diplomatic representative of the West Ukrainian People's Republic in Austria from 1919 to 1920, and later the ambassador of the Ukrainian People's Republic to Germany and Switzerland.
4	1923–1926	Zenon Kurbas		General consul of the Ukrainian People's Republic to Switzerland.
5	1992–1993	Andriy Ozadovs'ky		Ukrainian diplomat.
6	1993–1997	Oleksandr Slipchenko		Ukrainian diplomat and journalist.
7	1998–2000	Nina Koval's'ka		Ukrainian diplomat and first female Ukrainian ambassador to Switzerland.
8	2000–2003	Yevhen Bersheda		Ukrainian diplomat and acting director of the Verkhovna Rada Institute of Legislation.
9	2003–2004	Suzanna Stanik		Ukrainian lawyer and a former judge on the Constitutional Court of Ukraine.
10	2004–2008	Ostap Yukhymovych		Ukrainian diplomat.
11	2008–2014	Ihor Dir		Ukrainian diplomat.
12	2014–2018	Ostap Yukhymovych		Ukrainian diplomat.
13	2018–2022	Artem Rybchenko		Ukrainian diplomat. The current ambassador of Ukraine to the Swiss Confederation and the Principality of Liechtenstein.
13	2022	Iryna Venediktova		Ukrainian diplomat. The current ambassador of Ukraine to the Swiss Confederation and the Principality of Liechtenstein.

== See also ==
- Switzerland–Ukraine relations
