= Iacob Zadik =

Romanian artillery and infantry commander (1867–1970)

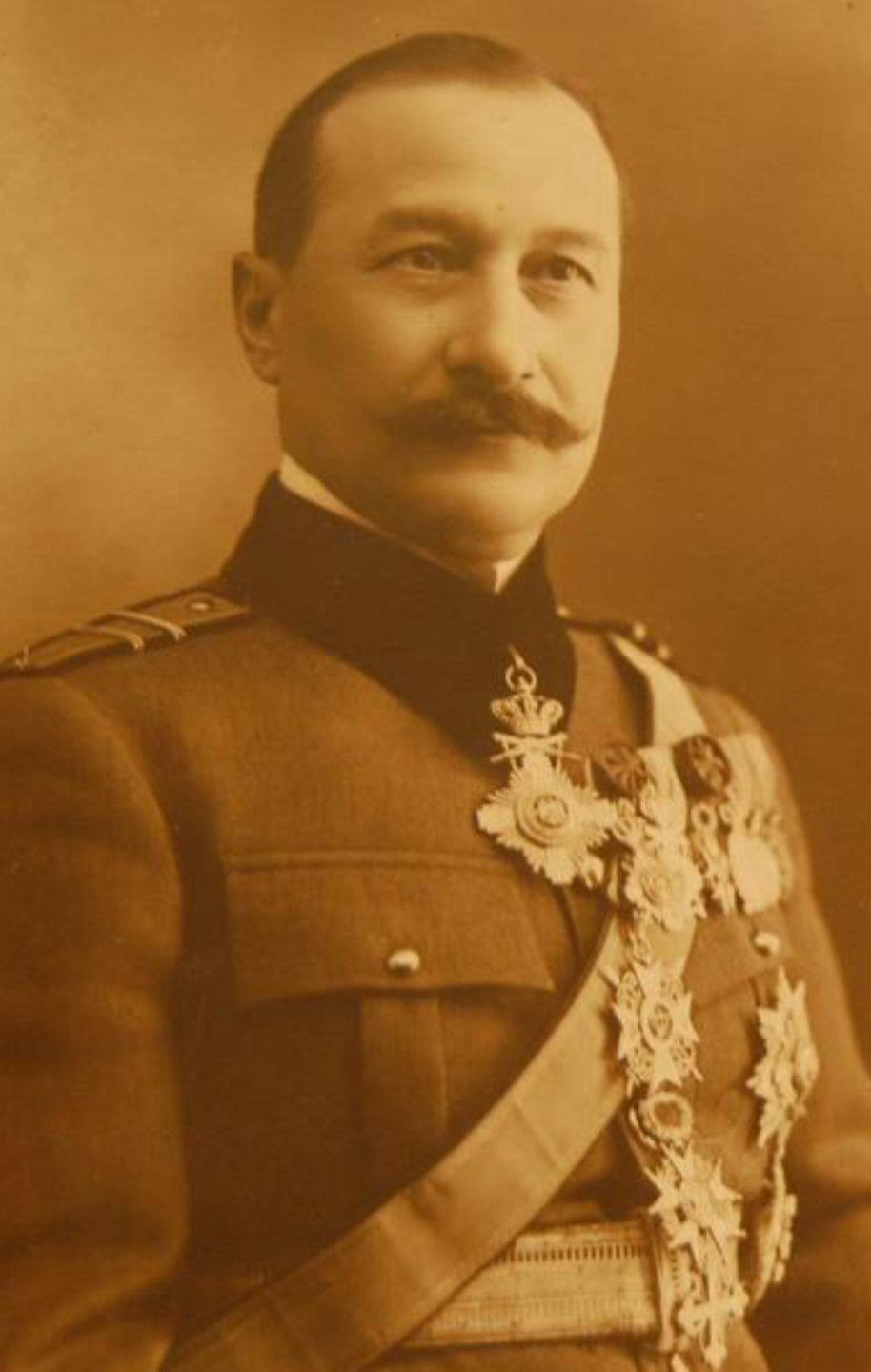
- Zadik in 1917
- Born: December 20, 1867; Brătulești, Roman County, United Principalities
- Died: April 8, 1970 (aged 102); Bucharest, Communist Romania
- Burial place: Bellu Cemetery
- Spouse: Rosa Zadik
- Children: 3 (including Colonel Grigore Zadik)
- Military career
- Allegiance: Romania
- Branch: Romanian Land Forces
- Service years: 1886–1929
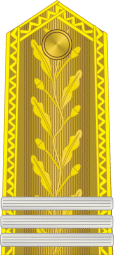
- Rank: Divisional General
- Commands: First Army; 8th Infantry Division; 4th Army Corps
- Conflicts: Romanian Peasants' Revolt; Second Balkan War; World War I; Romanian campaign; Battle of Mărășești; First Battle of Oituz; Bukovina expedition; Polish–Ukrainian War; Romanian occupation of Pokuttia
- Awards: Commander of the Order of Saint Stanislaus Grad Officer of the Order of the Star of Romania; Grand Cross of the Order of the Crown; Commander of the Legion of Honor; Grand Officer of the Order of Ferdinand I Order of the Fatherland's Defense, Second Class

Iacob Zadik (also spelled Zadig or Zadic; Armenian: Հակոբ Զատիկ; Ukrainian: Якоб Задік; December 8, 1867 – April 8, 1970) was a Romanian artillery and infantry commander, who rose to the rank of divisional general. An assimilated ethnic Armenian, he prepared for a career in the Romanian Land Forces beginning at age nine. This led him to complete military training at several schools, including the Higher War School, where he graduated in 1898. Involved in repressing the 1907 Peasants' Revolt, he fist saw field action during the Second Balkan War (1913). He spent the early years of World War I in France, appointed to the staff of Joseph Joffre, but returned in time to participate in the Romanian offensive of 1916. As one of the leaders of the First Army, Zadik then took part in the defense of Moldavia, specifically the battles of Mărășești and First Oituz. During the armistice period of early 1918, he took leadership of the 8th Infantry Division in Botoșani.

Zadik earned distinction especially for leading the 8th Infantry Division's November 1918 expedition into the Duchy of Bukovina, which helped that region unite with Romania. He then secured Romanian Bukovina's northern border by moving against the West Ukrainian People's Republic and the Austrian Sich Riflemen, capturing Archduke Wilhelm of Austria; in early to mid 1919, his 8th Division was on a peacekeeping mission to Pokuttia, which was the site of multiple conflicts between Poles and Ukrainians. Though he effectively secured Pokuttia for annexation by the Second Polish Republic, Zadik extended his protection toward the Ukrainian civilians. He later served briefly as the head of the military command in Bessarabia, which was later incorporated in his command of the 4th Army Corps. During the 1920s, he involved himself in containing criminal activity on the eastern borders of Greater Romania. Just before retiring in 1929, he drew controversy with his decision to institute a state of siege on Romania's border with the Soviet Union.

Zadik withdrew from active duty and took administrative positions, including one at the Aircraft Construction Enterprise, while also serving as vice president of Cultul Eroilor society in the late 1920s. His career in the arms was followed by his son Grigore, who specialized in anti-aircraft defense. After the introduction of a communist regime in 1947, Zadik Sr was singled out for having publicly supported Bessarabia's incorporation within Romania; he was consequently imprisoned during the 1950s, but rehabilitated the following decade. Though his name was left out of specialized works, he received decorations for his past service, and was rumored to have been rescued from poverty by high-ranking members of the Communist Party apparatus, including Emil Bodnăraș; in his final years, he made public statements in support of the national-communist party line. He died in 1970, aged 102.

== Biography ==
=== Early life ===
The Zadiks were ethnic Armenians who had settled in the area during the Middle Ages, and whom the General described as "tied to the ancestral land [of Romania]." The son of Grigore and Eufrosina, Iacob was born on December 20 (Old Style: December 8) in Brătulești, Roman County, which was then administered as part of the United Principalities of Moldavia and Wallachia. His father, who lived between 1830 and 1902, was a Senator of Romania and leader of the Vaslui County council, as well as on officer of the Order of the Star of Romania and the Order of the Crown. An agriculturalist, in 1889 he received an honorable mention at the Paris World's Fair. Iacob himself shunned civilian life and chose a career in the military. In a 1967 interview with journalist V. Firoiu, he spoke of some his first memories, namely the recruitment and departure of young soldiers to fight in the Romanian War of Independence (1877–1878). He credited these events with instilling in him an "instinct for the army", adding: "everything I did from that moment on, I did with the army on my mind."

Zadik initially studied in Iași at Trei Ierarhi school (1874–1878), followed by Institutele-Unite (1878–1886). After first persuading his parents, he was allowed to apply for the Military High School in that same city—according to his own testimony, he was only accepted because of his high grades, as the school was generally reserved for the children of Land Forces officers. During the first years of the Kingdom of Romania, Zadik was a School Sergent, leading its 4th Grade; Nicolae Petala was his colleague, a Corporal of the 3rd Grade. He became an Artillery Sublieutenant in July 1888, before his graduation.

Zadik then trained as an officer (to 1891), by attending Bucharest's School of Officers. His focus was on artillery training, though he also took mandatory training in cavalry warfare; he specialized in training artillery regiments on location. He moved frequently, stationed with various regiments in Focșani, Brăila, Tulcea, Constanța, Bârlad, and Roman. During his youth in the military, he befriended two writers, Mihail Sadoveanu (whose novels became favorites of his) and Emil Gârleanu (who was also a fellow officer). A Lieutenant in 1891, he was involved in a sexual scandal after Cojocaru, a jealous husband and army private, assaulted him; public controversy ensued when a military tribunal sentenced Cojocaru to a six-years prison term.

=== First commissions ===
From 1896 to 1898, Zadik also studied at the Higher War School. He steadily rose through the ranks, becoming an army officer in 1901. His son was born in Bucharest on March 27, 1898, following his father's career choices by enlisting for the army school at Dealu Monastery. As a lieutenant colonel, Zadik Sr was assigned to the 1st Infantry Division in Craiova, and later to the 7th Division in Roman. In the latter capacity, he was involved in repressing the Romanian Peasants' Revolt, organizing interrogations of officers who "have been in contact with the rebels". Zadik first saw action abroad during the Second Balkan War (1913). He became Colonel, and was assigned to the Staff of the 3rd Army Corps in Galați, shortly before World War I; in October 1914, he was moved to the 4th Army Corps in Iași. In 1915–1916, he went on a mission to Joseph Joffre, commander of the French Army on the Western Front.

Returning to Romania after its 1916 entry into the war, Zadik was assigned to the Northern Army at Bacău, and drafted plans for the Romanian offensive into Austria-Hungary. In September of that year, he became a Commander of the Order of Saint Stanislaus, and was recognized as an Officer of the Star of Romania in November. As Romania was faced with a massive counteroffensive and only held on to Western Moldavia, he became Chief of Staff of the First Army, reconstructed from surviving units at Podu Iloaiei (December 1, 1916); he was made brigadier general on April 1, 1917, and, from May 15, became Constantin Cristescu's second in command within the First Army. He was moved to the front during June, taking over defensive positions in Tecuci County and relieving the 1st Russian Army. By December, his son Grigore had been evacuated with the entire Dealu army school to Iași, and faced the prospect of being moved to safety in the Russian Empire. In January, he fell ill with epidemic typhus, and had to be hospitalized. Grigore's colleague and "forever a friend", engineer Constantin Nicolau, notes that the other Zadiks were by then living in Roman. He also recalls that Zadik Sr treated him "like a father".

During the defense of Moldavia, Zadik helped his troops achieve victory in the Battle of Mărășești, though he later credited success to "the Romanian peasant set out to defend his ancestral lands". He was present for, though not directly involved in, the successful bayonet counterattack mounted by the "white ghosts"—soldiers of the 32nd Infantry Regiment, who dressed down to their underwear. While serving as a Secretary in the Ministry of War Ammunition (from September 1), Zadik held a command position in the First Battle of Oituz, and became an Officer of the Order of the Crown (he would receive its Grand Cross in 1919). Grigore Zadik saw action with the Romanian Air Corps (balloon section), despite being underage; as reported by the General, his son's missions were his only cause for worry during that stage of war. Grigore survived the campaign and was made a Sublieutenant.

=== Bukovina expedition ===
==== Preparations ====
Zadik served in the Romanian War Ministry in 1918–1919, returning to active duty in 1919–1922. From February 1918, at a time when Romania had sued for peace, he was serving as commander of the 8th Infantry Division, stationed in Botoșani. This period witnessed his participation in the Great Union—specifically, the unification of Romanian-inhabited territories in Austria-Hungary with the Romanian Kingdom. In autumn 1918, after the Austrian governor of the Duchy of Bukovina, Josef Graf von Ezdorf, refused a request by Iancu Flondor to cede power, Zadik led the troops who occupied the province. These events witnessed a breakdown of social and military order in the Duchy. Early on November 5 (Old Style: October 23), Zadik received a report from Anton Ionescu, the Border Guards commander stationed in front of Ițcani, suggesting that the Austrian garrison had left that town, which the Austrian Gendarmerie could no longer protect against civilian violence. That afternoon, Zadik received orders to take Ițcani and Suceava. The official motivation was provided by reports out of Burdujeni (a town now incorporated with Suceava), namely that "bands armed with rifles and machine guns are devastating the city".

These reports were substantiated by Flondor in multiple telegrams he addressed to Marghiloman, pleading for a military intervention throughout the Duchy. Literary historian Ion Filipciuc believes that, while the brigands in such descriptions have generally been taken for Austrian Sich Riflemen under Archduke Wilhelm of Austria, they were in fact "Ukrainian deserters and Bolsheviks", who numbered in the hundreds, and who only had immediate goals such as robbery. Officially, Zadik's mandate was to help the Romanian National Guard and the Austrian Gendarmes—the Romanian Prime Minister, Alexandru Marghiloman, would not give open recognition to Flondor's National Council, as this would have been a breach of Romania's peace treaty with Austria. However, in a letter he sent to Alexandru Tzigara-Samurcaș, Marghiloman argued that he was acting specifically against Austrian rule, and confessed that Zadik was to march on Cernăuți, the Bukovinian capital. Zadik's opening proclamation to the people of Bukovina, issued on November 6, referred to his crossing over a "border placed between us by cruel fate", and to the Romanian Army as determined to ensure self-determination ("the legitimate right of peoples to dispose of their own fate").

The troops involved were from the 8th Infantry Division (comprising the 16th, 29th and 37th Infantry Regiments), which was at the time largely demobilized, with many soldiers on leave to perform agricultural tasks. It was supplemented troops from the Romanian Gendarmerie and Border Guards. Their exact orders were to act as if on a regular campaign, directed against "brigands" (răufăcători), but without any forced requisitioning; troops were to return to their headquarters once this mission was declared accomplished. The first Romanian units entering Suceava on the early hours of November 6 were Anton Ionescu's Border Guards, which immediately proclaimed that the border had been erased; this undiplomatic move was corrected on November 8, as Zadik entered the city, with a proclamation insisting that Romanian troops were only there as a protective shield. Zadik eventually collected a 3,000-strong expeditionary force, operationally divided into three detachments: "Dragoș", "Alexandru cel Bun", and "Suceava". The auxiliary force of Gendarmes and Border Guards, alongside a cavalry squadron, was ordered to move westwards, into Gura Humorului.

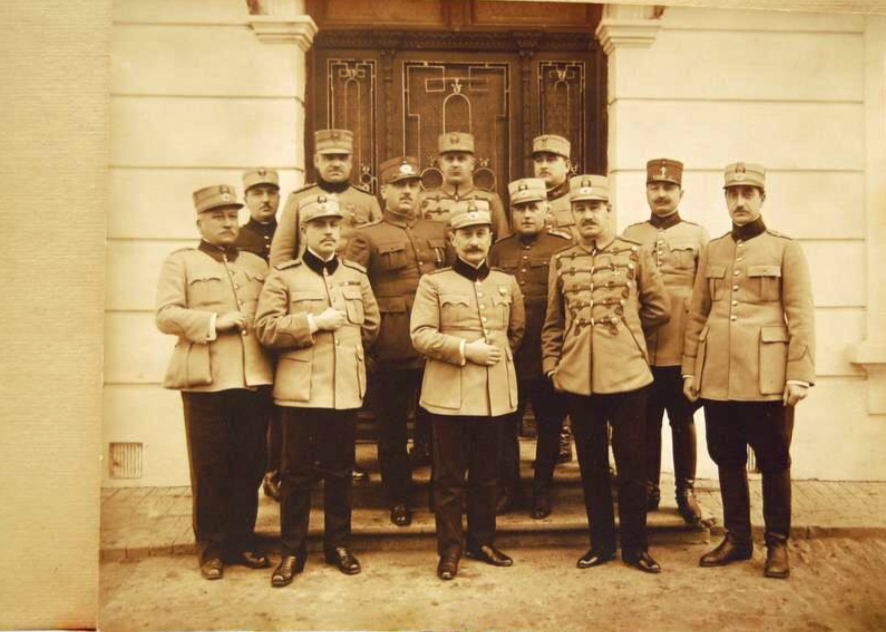
Zadik and the 8th Infantry Division staff in Cernăuți, 1918

Zadik's troops were still on the move as Romania resumed its war on the Central Powers, joining efforts with the Allied Army of the Orient. These events, and Marghiloman's downfall, allowed the advance into Bukovina to be integrated within the larger war effort. Still in Suceava on November 8, Zadik wrote in the city album: "Here endeth Habsburg domination. Fini [sic] Austria". That same day, he met two of Flondor's envoys, who were disguised in rags to avoid being captured by "anarchists in control of the Cernăuți–Ițcani route". The overall push was assisted by Romanian units from the disintegrating Hungarian Army, who disputed the city with Ukrainians loyal to the West Ukrainian People's Republic (ZUNR)—on November 9, Ilie Lazăr took the city for the former camp, planting the flag of Romania on Cernăuți City Hall. Zadik procrastinated, still waiting for Romania to officially proclaim its reentry into the war. He stationed his force for a days-long rest about 60 kilometers outside the city; Lazăr traveled there to meet him: "I asked him to make his entry, for the population had been out in the streets for three days, waiting for him to arrive."

==== At Cernăuți ====
Zadik eventually entered Cernăuți on November 11, by way of Horecea Mănăstirii suburb. He shared his automobile with Lazăr and Lieutenant Colonel Nicolae Rovinaru, stopping in front of the National Romanian Home. Here, Zadik was met by Romanian women, who "pelted him with flowers", and by Flondor, who reportedly said: "let us embrace as two brothers who have not seen each other in 155 years". In their speeches, both Flondor and Zadik referenced "Greater Romania"—the latter also paid homage to Grigore Ghica, who had tried to oppose Bukovina's occupation in 1774, and had "lost his head" as a result. Philologist Sextil Pușcariu, who was active within the Romanian movement in Bukovina, recalls the ceremony in which he and his colleagues first met with Zadik: "A very emotional Flondor spoke, followed by an even more emotional Zadik. Both speeches were weak and poorly recited: either speaker lost his train of thought again and again, could no longer recall phrases they had learned by heart, and took such pauses that under normal circumstances would have been embarrassing. [...] Everyone's eyes teared up as Flondor and Zadik embraced each other, I could feel my own tears running down my cheek."

Zadik's arrival coincided exactly with the Armistice on the Western Front, which led to a suspension of hostilities with Austria-Hungary. His presence was met with a public protest by the Austrian loyalist Aurel Onciul, who presented himself as the governor of lower Bukovina. The two engaged in a dialogue, until Zadik invited Onciul to present his case directly to the Romanian government in Iași; Onciul followed up on the invitation and found himself "assaulted by some youths" upon arriving at Iași railway station, resulting in his hospitalization and political neutralization. Similarly, Zadik arrested the leaders of a "Ukrainian republic" that had been unilaterally proclaimed in Coțmani (Kitsman)—including Hierotheus Pihuliak and Volodymyr Zalozetsky-Sas.

On behalf of the repressed entity, Omelyan Popovych addressed the ZUNR a letter which reported "unjust and groundless violence that is being committed against our people in Bukovina" by the Romanian authorities, both civilian and military. Popovych accused Zadik of having swiftly executed "the student Tupkal" and some tens of peasants, and of beating others to death, because he wanted to present Ukraianians as dangerous; he adds: "There was no rebellion in Bukovina and there is no rebellion, unless these new abuses will now stretch the string of patience." While many Ukrainians simply left Bukovina in protest, Zadik's entry into Bukovina was welcomed by the local Poles: their paramilitary Polish Legion paraded before him in Cernăuți. Zadik was also instrumental in curbing violence against Bukovina Jews, which had flared up in places such as Dorna Candrenilor, Todirești, and Pilugani.

=== Moving on Pokuttia ===
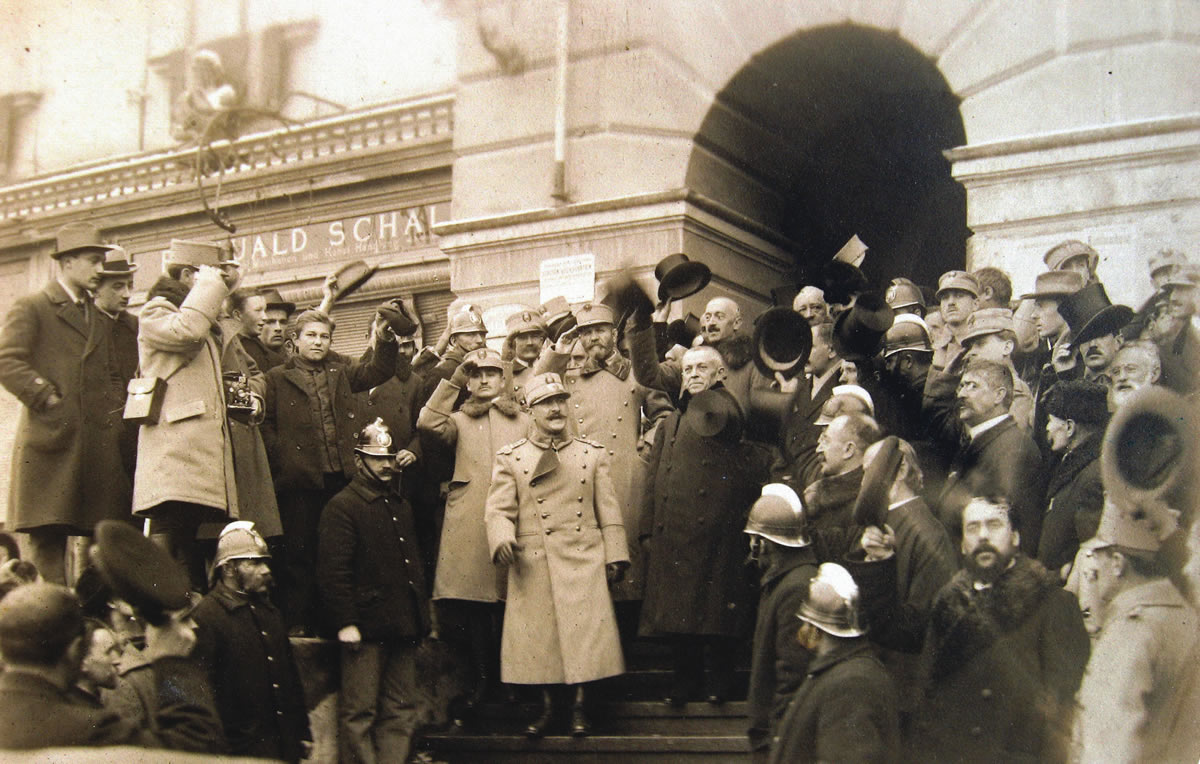
Iancu Flondor and Zadik announcing the vote for the union of Bukovina with Romania on November 28, 1918

Within days of his Cernăuți entry, the Romanian General Staff ordered Zadik to occupy the entire Bukovina, including its Ukrainian-majority northern half. This was a retaliation for the ZUNR's attempt to mobilize all able-bodied Ukrainian men into the Ukrainian Galician Army (UHA). As head of the General Staff, Constantin Prezan personally cleared Zadik for this expedition, which went against the terms of the November Armistice; during his advance, he also routed the Sich Riflemen, who withdrew from northern Bukovina, and captured Archduke Wilhelm. The operation, fully accomplished on November 21, was largely without bloodshed—one exception occurred during the advance on Luzhany, when the "Dragoș" detachment was engaged in a skirmish that resulted in deaths on both sides.

Zadik's securing of the province paved the way for the union of Bukovina with Romania, ultimately proclaimed on November 28. He was present for the deliberations as an army representative, and, as Filipciuc notes, had no voting rights; Filipciuc also dismisses as inaccurate any reports suggesting that Zadik himself signed the union proclamation. On Saint Stephen's Day (December 27) 1918, the General presided over the Cernăuți festivities honoring Stephen the Great. From January 1919, Zadik and his 8th Infantry Division were tasked with organizing a Romanian offensive into Pokuttia, which they were to pacify in support of Poland; Zadik's operation was directed against the ZUNR, which controlled Pokuttia and still stated a claim to northern Bukovina.

ZUNR representatives, alarmed by Romanian maneuvers, met Zadik in Bukovina and asked for a truce. The two sides only agreed that the territorial conflict should be resolved with further negotiations in Bucharest. From the ZUNR side, Stepan Vytvytskyi also obtained Zadik's guarantee that "the Romanian military administration had no offensive intentions against the territory of our state." The Romanian incursion began on May 22, and saw no opposition from the UHA, which withdrew its soldiers to the Polish front. The expedition was closely preceded by the airdropping of leaflets which included Zadik's pledges to the Pokuttian inhabitants. During May–June 1919, Iacob Zadik oversaw the joining of Romanian troops in Transylvania, Bukovina, and Bessarabia; the Romanian General Staff assigned him to command all troops stationed between Maramureș and Hotin County. On May 28, he met with Polish General Franciszek Kraliczek-Krajowski, agreeing to form a joint military command and a civilian government, both based in Kolomyia. The two sides could not agree on other terms: the Poles demanded that they be allowed to move between Romanian troops, all the way south to the Bukovina border, and also that the Romanian side allow Poles to form political groups throughout Pokuttia.

On May 29, Zadik supervised the imposition of a state of siege, meant to quell conflicts between Polish and Ukrainian civilians. Two days later, he and other Romanian officers were asked to leave Nadvirna, which was part of a Polish-controlled area, as the temporary administration could not vouch for his safety. In that context, local Ukrainians proceeded to ask the Romanian authorities to protect them from persecution and violence, while local Poles were complaining of mistreatment in Romanian-controlled areas. On June 7, Zadik took command of General Nicolae Petala's troops, which had also been moved into Pokuttia. His final report to Petala included a request to have the Polish 4th Rifle Division moved out of Cernăuți (where it was allegedly causing damages) and into Pokuttia. On June 16, he received from Bucharest his orders to evacuate Pokuttia. He then oversaw the terms of the withdrawal with his Polish counterparts, Wacław Iwaszkiewicz-Rudoszański and Robert Lamezan de Salins; discussions took place in Lemberg, but the outcome was postponed by more urgent developments in the parallel Hungarian–Romanian War. Zadik and his troops finally left the region to be annexed by Poland, on August 17 or 18, 1919. On his departure, the General thanked Pokuttians for their friendly behavior toward his troops. Only four Romanian soldiers had died in combat throughout the entire operation, though three others were lost to accidents.

=== Bessarabian mission and retirement ===
Later in 1919, Zadik became a divisional general. On the first-year anniversary of the Bukovina union, he addressed its people a proclamation, thanking them for their cooperation; the document mentioned Flondor's rival Ion Nistor, but not Flondor himself, contributing to the latter's resentment toward the Romanian regime. Nistor himself rarely referred to Zadik's contribution, which he left out of topical work, Unirea Bucovinei. Zadik continued to be well regarded by the Bukovina Jews and Germans, with the newspaper Das Volk describing him as an "honorable defender and supporter" of the ethnic minorities. On December 14, Zadik was at Cernăuți, attending a parastas service held by the Romanian Orthodox Church in memory of Bukovinians killed in action throughout the war. That same day, the cultural club known as Societatea Academică Junimea inducted Zadik as an honorary member. In June of the following year, Zadik was in Soroca, where he inaugurated work on a monument to Stan Poetaș, killed in action during the Khotyn Uprising. Returning as commander of the 4th Corps, he made the news again in February 1921, after being held up by armed robbers while traveling between Iași and Vaslui. During July, he lectured at the Priests' Conference in Iași, convened by Pimen Georgescu, about the activities of the Seventh-day Adventists, whom he regarded as dangerous. A month later, he traveled in Hotin and Soroca Counties, where he supervised the backlash against "criminal gangs".

In the years following his expeditions, Zadik acquired an international reputation, which reached the Republic of Armenia. In a report he compiled for the latter's government in 1919, Bessarabian Armenian activist Artyom Tumanyan noted that Zadik was one of Romania's most prominent "indigenous Armenians"—though he also indicated that such Armenians had fully assimilated into Romanian life. In Soviet historiography as it developed in the Ukrainian SSR (which had advanced its own version of Ukrainian irredentism), Zadik and his colleagues had instead preserved a negative image. In a 1928 brochure, Ukrainian communist Hrihoriy Piddubny argued that Zadik had tricked the Ukrainian "petty bourgeoisie" of northern Bukovina by pretending not to want the territory annexed, thus dulling their senses and rendering their opposition futile.

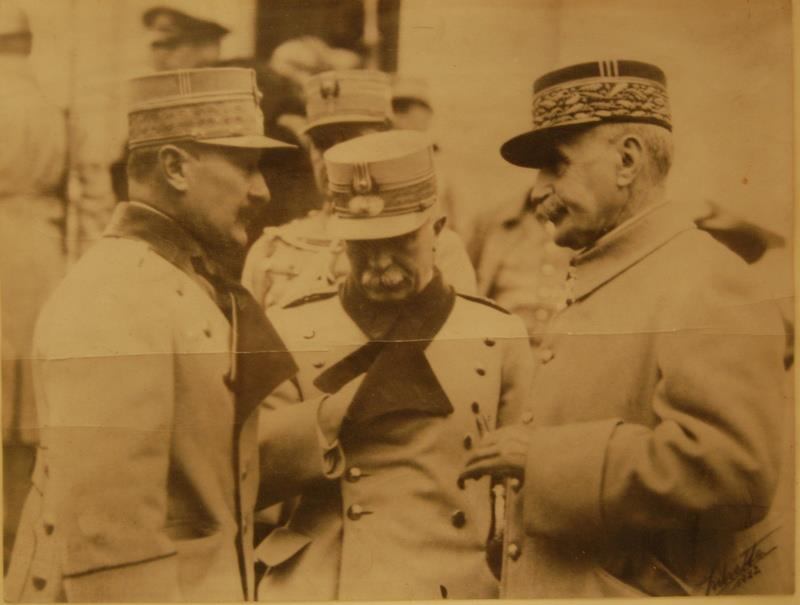
Zadik (left) with Ferdinand Foch

Again withdrawn from active duty, Zadik served on the Superior Council of the Romanian Army (1922–1924) and a review board for would-be generals. In April–November 1924, he was Military Commander of Bessarabia. In 1923, the year when he welcomed to Romania Ferdinand Foch, Zadik was made a Commander of the Legion of Honor, a Grand Officer of the Order of Saints Maurice and Lazarus, and a Grand Officer of the Star of Romania. In 1925, he attended a commemoration of the Council of Nicaea, and appears in the collective portrait done by Gheorghe Popovici. By 1928, when Grigore Zadik was involved with teaching aerostatics at a specialized school in Bucharest, Iacob was a vice president of Cultul Eroilor ("Heroes' Cult") society, in which capacity he obtained that a World War memorial be erected at Galata.

In January 1929, as commander of the 4th Army Corps, Zadik Sr issued an ordinance introducing the state of siege all along Romania's border with the Soviet Union. This drew controversy in Romania, as creating a precedent for generals legislating against Parliament; as noted by the newspaper Adevărul, his ruling was also a way to bypass the anti-censorship laws advanced by the National Peasants' Party and the Maniu cabinet. According to a front-page critique in that same newspaper, the order had transformed Zadik into a hero to the Romanian far-right. The latter's exponents now argued that his intervention was justified by communist infiltration in Bessarabia and Bukovina. Zadik became an old-age pensioner in October 1929, but continued to work for government, serving as a delegate on the board of the Aircraft Construction Enterprise (December 1929–June 1938). In 1930, he was created an Officer in the Order of Polonia Restituta. In 1935 he was one of the inaugural holders of the Order of Ferdinand I (as Grand Officer), also being recognized as an honorary citizen of Cernăuți in autumn 1937 (though some reports suggest that this distinction was bestowed upon him in 1918).

The General and his wife Rosa had two sons, both officers (the second of whom was named Ioan-Cristea) and a daughter, Margareta. By 1927, they were in-laws with Grigore Kessim, a prosecutor at the High Court of Cassation and Justice, also credited as the chief physician of Bucharest. Of Iacob's progeny, Grigore took high positions in the military, serving as Ion Antonescu's aide on mission to the League of Nations (1936); a Major in 1937, he spent the years 1937–1939 training with France's 11th Artillery Regiment, and, like his father, was inducted into the Legion of Honor. With his training in both artillery and aviation, he commanded and organized Bucharest's anti-aircraft defense during the early stages of World War II, when Romania was aligned with the Axis powers (1940–1942). He was then moved to the Eastern Front, where he similarly contributed to the defense of Rostov against the Soviet Air Forces.

=== Communist imprisonment and recovery ===
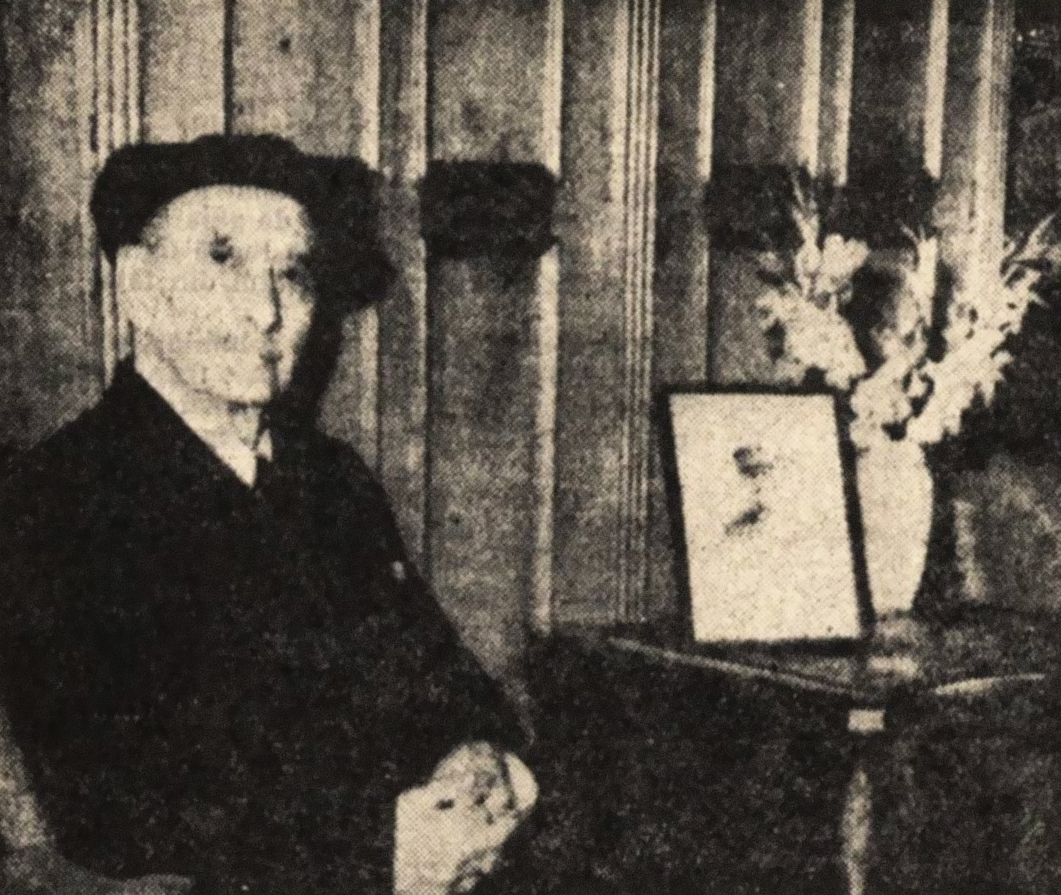
Zadik in December 1967, shortly before his 100th birthday

In 1967, the General recalled that he approved of the anti-Axis coup of August 1944; in its immediate aftermath, Grigore Zadik served as a liaison between the Romanian Army and Fyodor Tolbukhin's 4th Ukrainian Front. In 1948, the family home on Aleea Alexandru, Bucharest became nationalized property, though Zadik Sr still continued to reside in it. After being sent to the reserves, he had written a pamphlet titled "The Dniester, Romanian Land", stating the Romanian claim to Bessarabia against the Soviets. This later drew the ire of the communist regime, which imprisoned him in the 1950s. Colonel Zadik, meanwhile, was forced to resign from his position as head of the Air Defense Directorate, and lived out of the public eye. His father was still occasionally mentioned in works of history, including Eliza Campus' 1958 article on the Polish–Romanian alliance, which appeared in Studii.

Zadik Sr was finally released and rehabilitated in the early 1960s. In October 1967, the State Council, under Chivu Stoica, awarded him the Order of the Fatherland's Defense, Second Class, "on the occasion of his 100th birthday [sic], for feats of war accomplished during World War I". This was followed by Sabia de Onoare Medal in December. On August 12, 1967, his wartime recollections appeared in Scînteia, mouthpiece of the Romanian Communist Party. Military historian Vasile Arimia reports that, at some point before 1976, Zadik was living in Piatra Neamț and working as a coach driver. Arimia claims that he knew this to be true from General Emil Bodnăraș, the communist potentate, who claimed to have taken his carriage ride while visiting Bisericani Monastery. Arimia also recalls that President Nicolae Ceaușescu and Bodnăraș both took care of restoring Zadik to a more fitting social position, and ordered his home to be restored. Filipciuc dismisses this account as an urban legend meant to improve Bodnăraș's public image for posterity.

Grigore Zadik, admitted as a colonel in the new socialist army, lived with his father at Carol Davila Street 24, in the Bucharest neighborhood of Cotroceni. In old age, Iacob Zadik donated his memorabilia to the National Military Museum, and "three hundred of my valuable books, as well as forty-four music sheets—old songs and romanzas" to the Romanian Academy. The donation included several manuscripts of his memoirs. Filipciuc notes that Iacob, as a "contemporary of five wars" still kept informed of political developments as a centenarian, and was upset by the invasion of Czechoslovakia in August 1968.

Scînteia reporters visited Zadik and his son at their home during the legislative election of March 1969, alongside a team carrying the mobile ballot box. They quoted Zadik Sr as saying that his interest as a former soldier was in supporting world peace on the basis of non-interventionism; his son added that they had both been impressed by Ceaușescu's "extremely realistic foreign policy, with its rooting in truly reasonable principles". The general died on April 8, 1970, in Bucharest. He is credited by Firoiu as the "first Romanian general to have reached the age of 103", though Filipciuc corrects this inaccuracy by noting Zadik was nine months short of reaching that age; he is buried at Bellu Cemetery.

== Legacy ==
Including his interview in a 1974 anthology, Firoiu looked back on Zadik as "the very first one who, in front of his troops, has entered and liberated sweet Bukovina". As noted by Filipciuc, any other details on this expedition, as well as any mention of Zadik's stay in Pokuttia, were absent from Firoiu's published interview. Grigore survived his father only to February 1974, dying at age 76. The general was still entirely omitted from the 1983 reference work on Romanian military commanders; his memory was instead preserved by the Armenian community and the local Gregorian Church—by 1991, its Romanian Diocese Museum had a Zadik display case.

Although the December 1989 Revolution had toppled Ceaușescu, the Aleea Alexandru home was never returned to the family. General Zadik was formally commemorated by the Armenian community in Romania, represented by Varujan Vosganian and Gregorian bishop Tadev Hakobyan-Muradyan, with a special service held at Bellu on November 27, 2018. As noted by writer Magda Ursache, in November 2021 the anniversary of Bukovina's union was entirely omitted from the national calendar. In that context, "nobody as much as mentioned General Iacob Zadic's 8th Division, which entered Cernăuți on Nov[ember] 11, to curb Ukrainian terrorism."

== Awards ==
- Officer of Order of the Crown of Romania (1906)
- Officer of Order of the Star of Romania (1912)
- Commander of Legion of Honor (1923)
- Grand Cross of Order of the Crown of Romania (1929)
- Grand Officer of the Order of Ferdinand I (1935)
- Order of Defense of the Fatherland, 2nd degree (1967)
- Sabia de Onoare Medal (1967)
