= Edmund Fisher =

Edmund Fisher may refer to:

- Edmund Fisher (architect) (1872–1918), British architect
- Edmund Fisher (publisher) (1939–1995), British publisher

== See also ==
- Edmond H. Fischer (1920–2021), American-Swiss biochemist
- Edward Fisher (disambiguation)
- Edwin Fisher (disambiguation)
