= Iancu Flondor =

Austro-Hungarian politician (1865–1924)

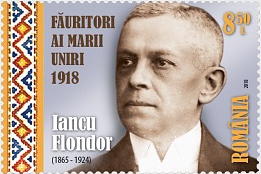
Iancu Flondor on a 2018 stamp of Romania

Iancu Flondor (3 August 1865 – 19 October 1924) was a Romanian politician who advocated Bukovina's union with the Kingdom of Romania.

He was born in the town of Storozhynets (Romanian: Storojineṭ) in Northern Bukovina (now in Ukraine). His parents were Gheorghe Flondor (1828–1892) and Isabella von Dobrowolski-Buchenthal (1835–1890). Married to Elena de Zotta, he fathered three sons: Șerban (1900–1971), Neagoe (1901–1952), and Mircea (1908–1928).

After graduating in 1884 from the German High School in Czernowitz with a baccalaureate degree, he studied at the Faculty of Law in Vienna (1885–1888), and obtained the title of Doctor of Law from the University of Vienna in 1894.

During the winter of 1918, Flondor clashed with his rival Aurel Onciul over the political future of Bukovina, a dispute which culminated in the November request by the National Council of Bukovina, headed by Flondor, for an intervention by the Romanian Army into what had become a chaotic Bukovina at the end of World War I. Under those circumstances, the Romanian government in Iași, wishing to protect the population, decided to send to Bukovina the 8th Division under the command of General Iacob Zadik, who entered Cernăuți, on 9 November 1918. On 12 November, the National Council of Bukovina effectively took the helm of Bukovina, forming a cabinet headed by Iancu Flondor. On 15/28 November 1918, the debates of General Congress of Bukovina opened at the Metropolitan Palace in Cernăuți and decided: "The unconditional and eternal union of Bukovina — within its old boundaries up to the rivers Ceremuș, Colacin, and Dniester — to the Kingdom of Romania".

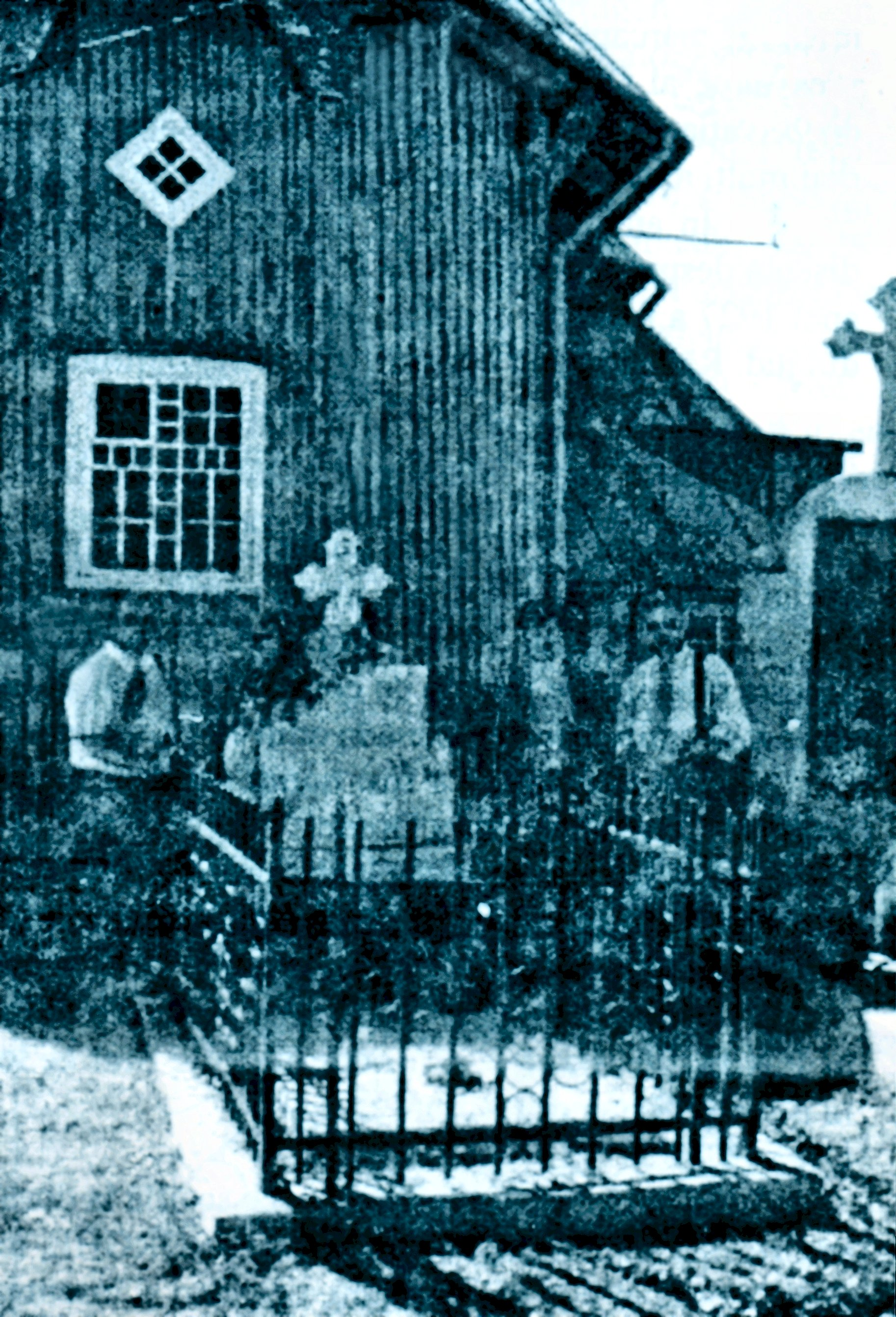
Flondor's tomb in Storojineṭ

He died in Cernăuṭi (now Chernivtsi), and was buried in Storojineṭ.

A bust of Flondor, sculpted by Marcel Mănăstireanu, was unveiled in Rădăuți in 2009. A street in Sector 2 of Bucharest bears his name.
