= Eduard Fischer =

Eduard Fischer may refer to:

- Eduard Fischer (general) (1862–1935), Austrian general
- Eduard Fischer (mycologist) (1861–1939), Swiss botanist and mycologist

== See also ==
- Eduardo Fischer (born 1980), Brazilian swimmer
- Edward Fisher (disambiguation)
