= Romanian occupation of Pokuttia =

Military occupation during the Polish-Ukrainian War

- Part of the Polish–Ukrainian War
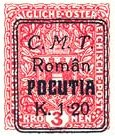
- Stamp of the Romanian military authorities for Pokuttia, 1919
Date	May–August 1919
Location	Historical region of Pokuttia, now in Ukraine
Result	Romanian victory

Belligerents
West Ukrainian People's Republic	Romania

Commanders and leaders
(West Ukrainian People's Republic) Mykhailo Omelianovych-Pavlenko	(Romania) Iacob Zadik

Strength
4,000	8th Infantry division

Casualties and losses
Unknown deaths 371 captured	7 dead, of which 4 in battle and 3 in accidents

The Romanian occupation of Pokuttia (Romanian: Pocuția) took place in early 1919, when, as a result of alliances concluded between Romania and Poland, the former entered the southeastern corner of the former Austro-Hungarian ruled province of Galicia. During the interwar period, Romania was Poland's main ally in Eastern Europe (see Polish–Romanian alliance). Both nations were bound by several treaties and history of this alliance dates back to the end of World War I and the Treaty of Versailles. However, to actively cooperate, governments in Bucharest and Warsaw emphasized the necessity of a shared border. Discussions about the border started in Paris some time at the beginning of 1919 and continued during the following months. The proposal for occupation was first advanced by the Romanian government of Ion I. C. Brătianu on May 8, 1919. Brătianu suggested this as a means to separate both Czechoslovakia and Hungary from Soviet influences, thus consolidating the position of both Greater Romania and the Second Polish Republic, as well as help the Poles get in touch with their Romanian ally.

The proposal was accepted by the Polish leader, Marshal Józef Piłsudski and on May 24, 1919, the Romanian Army 7. Infantry Division, led by General Iacob Zadik, entered Pokuttya. After three days, the Romanians met the Poles in the area of Kalusz. As Polish Army was involved in other conflicts (chiefly with the Soviets), the Romanians stayed in Pokuttia until late August 1919. Their units were stationed in such towns as Ivano-Frankivsk, and Kolomyia. In late summer of 1919 Polish troops entered Pokuttya (see Polish-Ukrainian War) and the Romanians withdrew to their country.

Also, the mutual cooperation resulted in Romanian permit for the free passage of the 4th Riflemen Division (under General Lucjan Żeligowski). This unit was kept in Romanian province of Bukovina for political purposes, and on June 17, 1919, the Romanians allowed it to enter Poland.

== See also ==
- Union of Bukovina with Romania
