= Claude Wild =

Swiss diplomat

Claude Wild (born 1 March 1964 in Lausanne) is a Swiss diplomat.

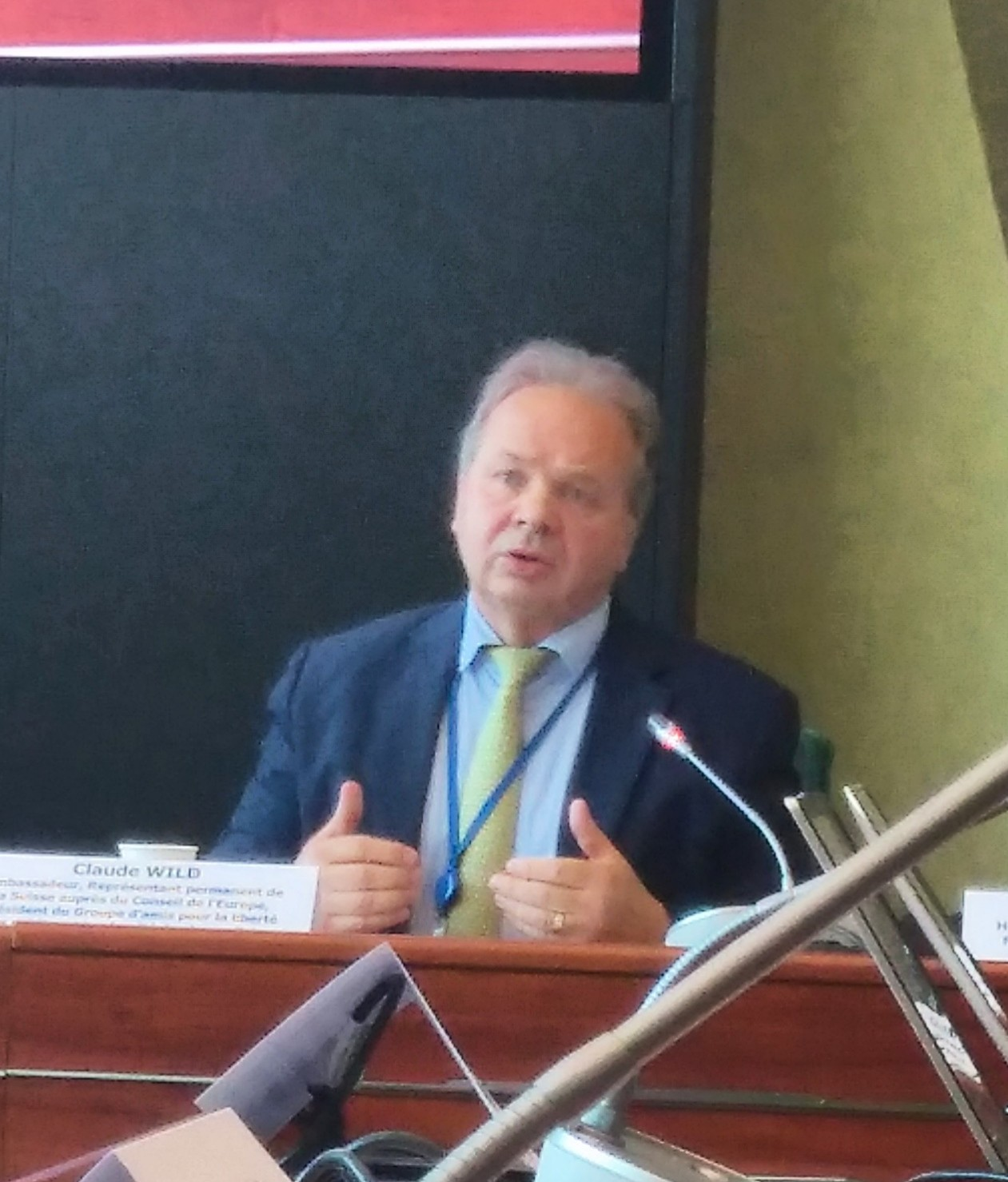
Claude Wild speaking at the Journalists Matter Conference in October 2024 in Strasbourg

== Life ==
=== Education ===
Claude Wild studied political science and international relations at the Graduate Institute of International Studies in Geneva where he completed a postgraduate degree.

=== Diplomatic career ===
He was appointed ambassador and head of the Human Security Department of the Federal Department of Foreign Affairs in 2010. In 2015, Ambassador Wild became Switzerland's permanent representative to the Organization for Security and Cooperation in Europe (OSCE), the United Nations, and other international organizations in Vienna.

Wild became ambassador to Kyiv in 2019 and was ambassador to Ukraine in the first months of the Russo-Ukrainian war. In early March 2022, Wild and his staff had to be escorted out of the country by special forces due to the threatening security situation. He returned to his post in the Ukrainian capital in May 2022. Wild was subsequently made responsible for the implementation of Swiss aid in Ukraine. He has repeatedly clarified that Switzerland's principle of neutrality in foreign policy (so-called Swiss neutrality) means, in the context of the war, that the country “does not join a military alliance, and does not send weapons to the conflict zone, even to support the victims”, yet “we stand clearly behind the Ukrainian position.” He has warned against Switzerland adopting a stance of "neutrality fetishism" in the context of the war. His posting as ambassador to Ukraine ended at the end of March 2023, and he was succeeded by Félix Baumann.

In April 2023, Wild became the permanent representative of Switzerland to the Council of Europe.
