= Edwin Fisher =

Edwin Fisher may refer to:

- Edwin Fisher (banker) (1883–1947), English banker, chairman of Barclay's Bank
- Eddie Fisher (singer) (Edwin John Fisher; 1928–2010), American singer
- Ed Fisher (American football) (Edwin Louis Fisher; born 1949), American football player

== See also ==
- Edmund Fisher (disambiguation)
- Edward Fisher (disambiguation)
