= Strunga =

- Commune
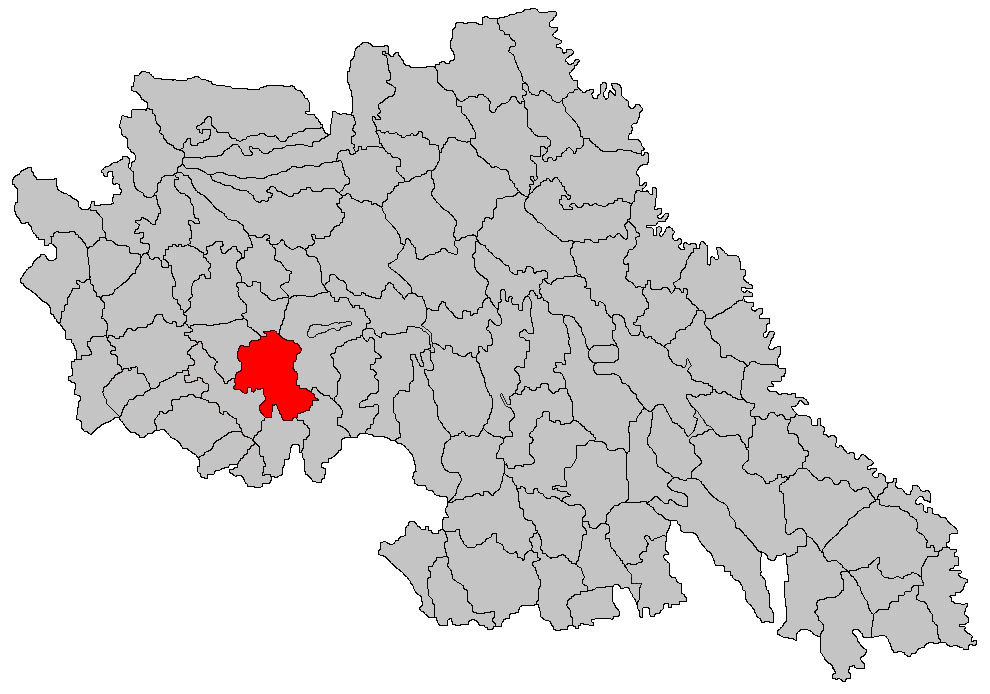
- Location in Iași County

- Location in Romania
- Coordinates: 47°11′N 26°57′E
- Country: Romania
- County: Iași
- Subdivisions: Strunga, Brătulești, Crivești, Cucova, Fărcășeni, Fedeleșeni, Gura Văii, Hăbășești

Government
  - Mayor (2024–2028): Sorin-Constantin Lazăr (PSD)
- Area: 71.3 km^{2} (27.5 sq mi)
- Population (2021-12-01): 3,498
  - Density: 49.1/km^{2} (127/sq mi)
- Time zone: UTC+02:00 (EET)
  - Summer (DST): UTC+03:00 (EEST)
- Postal code: 707465
- Area code: +40 x32
- Vehicle reg.: IS
- Website: primaria-strunga.ro

Strunga (Hungarian: Sztrunga) is a commune in Iași County, Western Moldavia, Romania. It is situated 55 km from Iași city. It is composed of eight villages: Brătulești, Crivești, Cucova, Fărcășeni, Fedeleșeni, Gura Văii, Hăbășești and Strunga.

At the 2002 census, 100% of inhabitants were ethnic Romanians. 55.3% were Romanian Orthodox, 43.8% Roman Catholic and 0.6% Seventh-day Adventist.

Today Strunga is a resort of local interest. Its mineral waters can be used in the treatment of many diseases.

== Natives ==
- Ion Manolescu-Strunga (1889–1951), politician
- Iacob Zadik (1867–1970), military leader
