= Union of Bukovina with Romania =

Regional unification in Eastern Europe (1918–1920)

The union of Bukovina with Romania was declared on 28 November 1918, being officially recognized by the international community in 1919 and 1920.

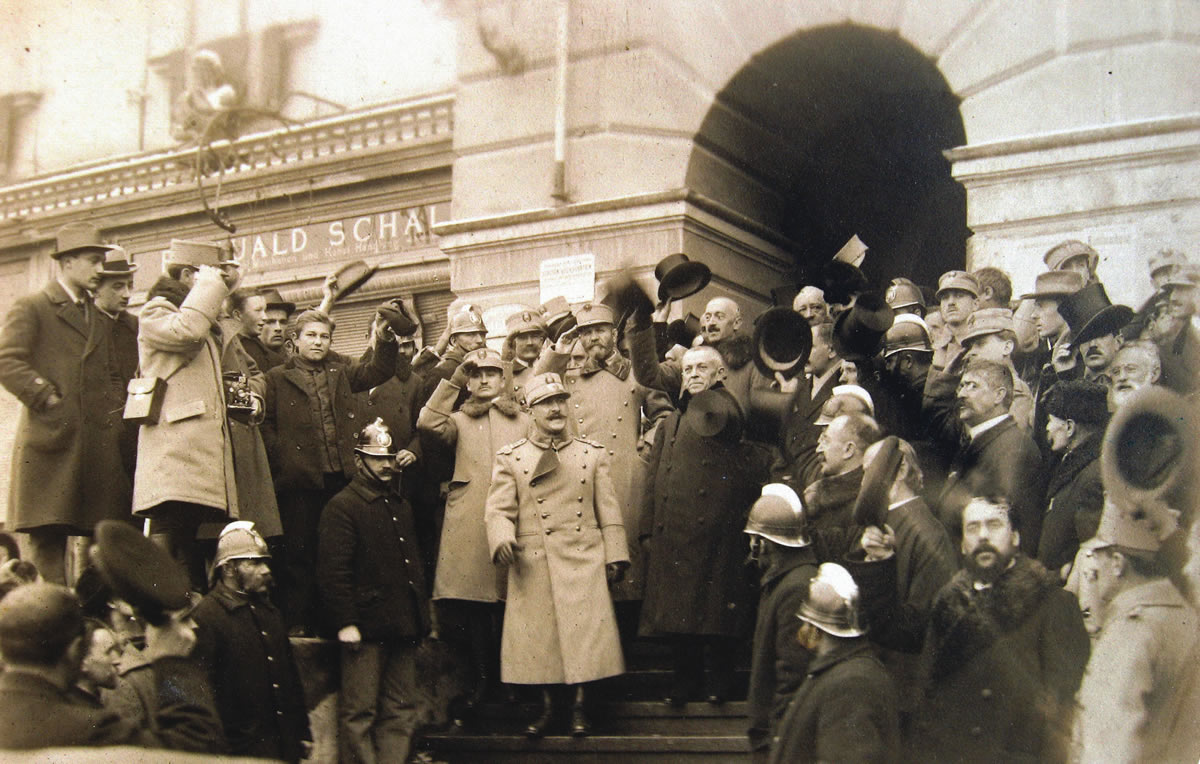
Iancu Flondor ans Iacob Zadik announcing the vote for the union of Bukovina with Romania, 28 November 1918

== Timeline of events ==
=== 1918 ===
- 22 October - Constantin Isopescu-Grecul, a Bukovinian Romanian deputy in the Austrian Imperial Council, warns the authorities in Vienna that if they do not force Budapest to release Transylvania and other Romanian-inhabited areas from Hungary, then the Romanian subjects of the empire would have to look for outside help.
- 25 October - The Ukrainian National Committee for Bukovina is formed.
- 27 October - The Romanian National Council is formed under the leadership of Iancu Flondor.
- 3 November - The Ukrainian National Rada takes control of the state apparatus in Czernowitz and the surrounding area.
- 4 November - Aurel Onciul, a Romanian Bukovinian politician, concludes an agreement (not authorized by the Romanian National Council) with the Ukrainian National Committee providing for the division of Bukovina along ethnic lines and joint Romanian-Ukrainian control over Czernowitz (the capital of Bukovina).
- 6 November - The Ukrainian National Committee occupies all Government buildings in Czernowitz and Omelian Popowicz is proclaimed President of "Ukrainian Bukovina".
- 7 November - Iancu Flondor appeals to the Romanian Government to occupy the entire land of Bukovina.
- 9/10 November - Romania re-declares war on the Central Powers (the May 1918 Treaty of Bucharest put an end to the first Romanian Campaign).
- 10 November - The Ukrainian National Committee together with its military supporters retreat from Czernowitz.
- 11 November - Czernowitz (claimed by the West Ukrainian People's Republic) is seized by the Romanian Army.
- 12 November - The Romanian National Council establishes a new government in Bukovina under Flondor's presidency.
- 28 November - The Romanian National Council, together with Polish and German representatives, convokes the General Congress of Bukovina which requests the union of Bukovina with Romania.
- 19 December - The Romanian Government issues a decree formalizing Bukovina's annexation.

=== 1919 ===
- 10 September - The Treaty of Saint-Germain-en-Laye is signed, recognizing Romanian sovereignty over Bukovina (the frontiers of Romania were to be later fixed).

=== 1920 ===
- 10 August - The Treaty of Sèvres established the Romanian-Polish boundary (mainly, based on the July 1919 Lwów Convention).

== Aftermath ==
Since 2015, Bukovina Day is celebrated in Romania every 28 November to commemorate the union of the region with Romania.

== Gallery ==
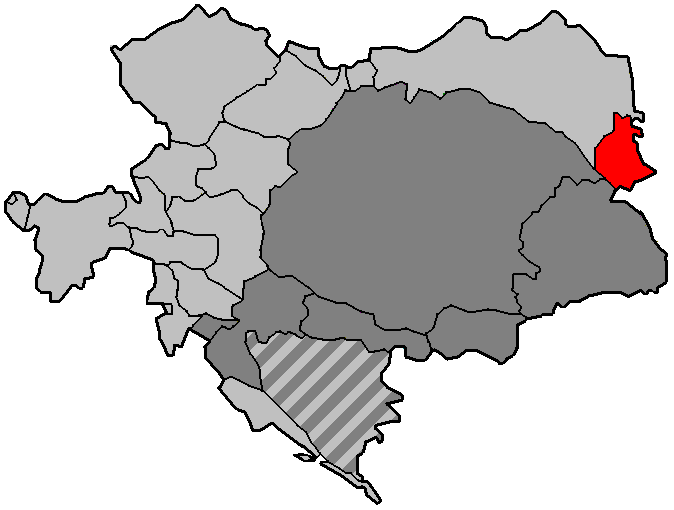
Bukovina within Austria-Hungary

Flag of Bukovina

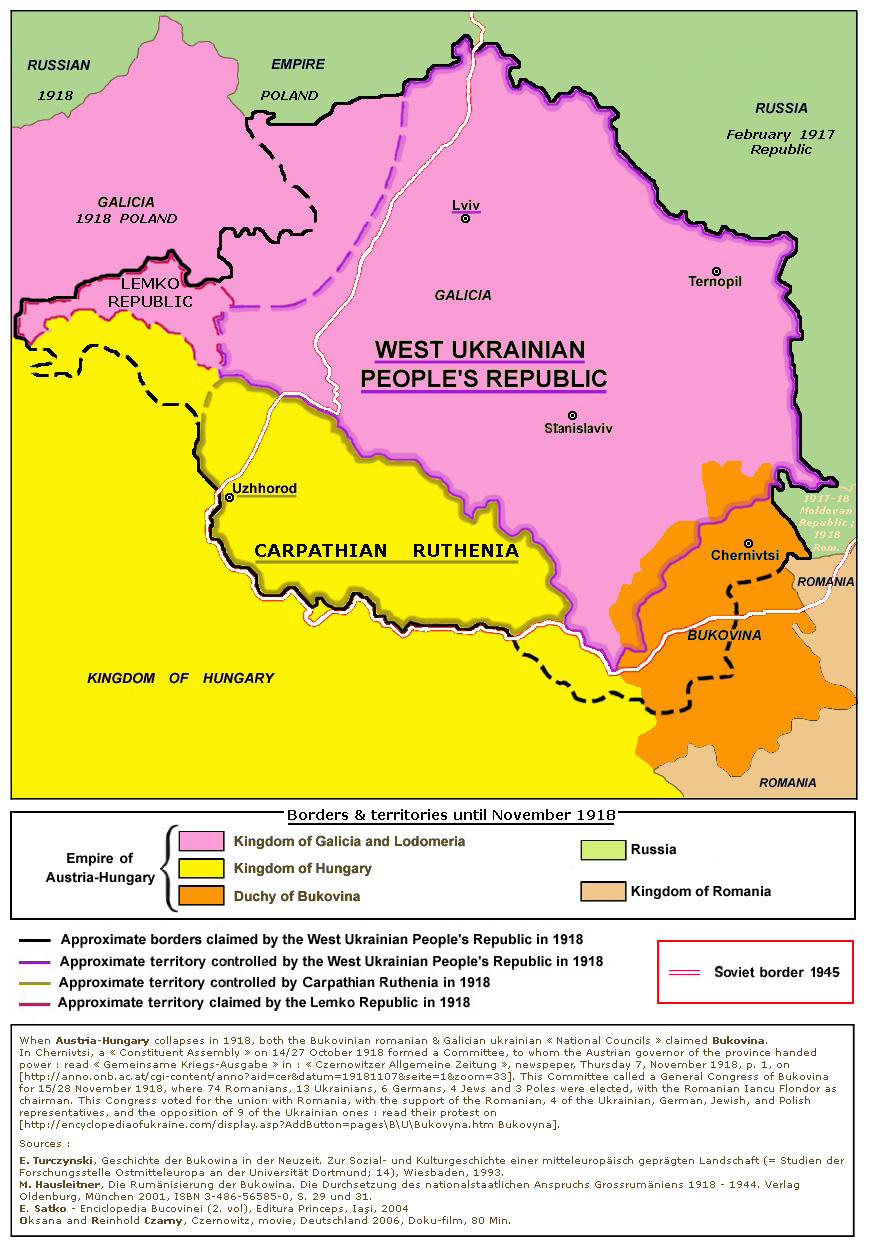
Division of Bukovina (orange) as claimed by the West Ukrainian People's Republic (black interrupted line)

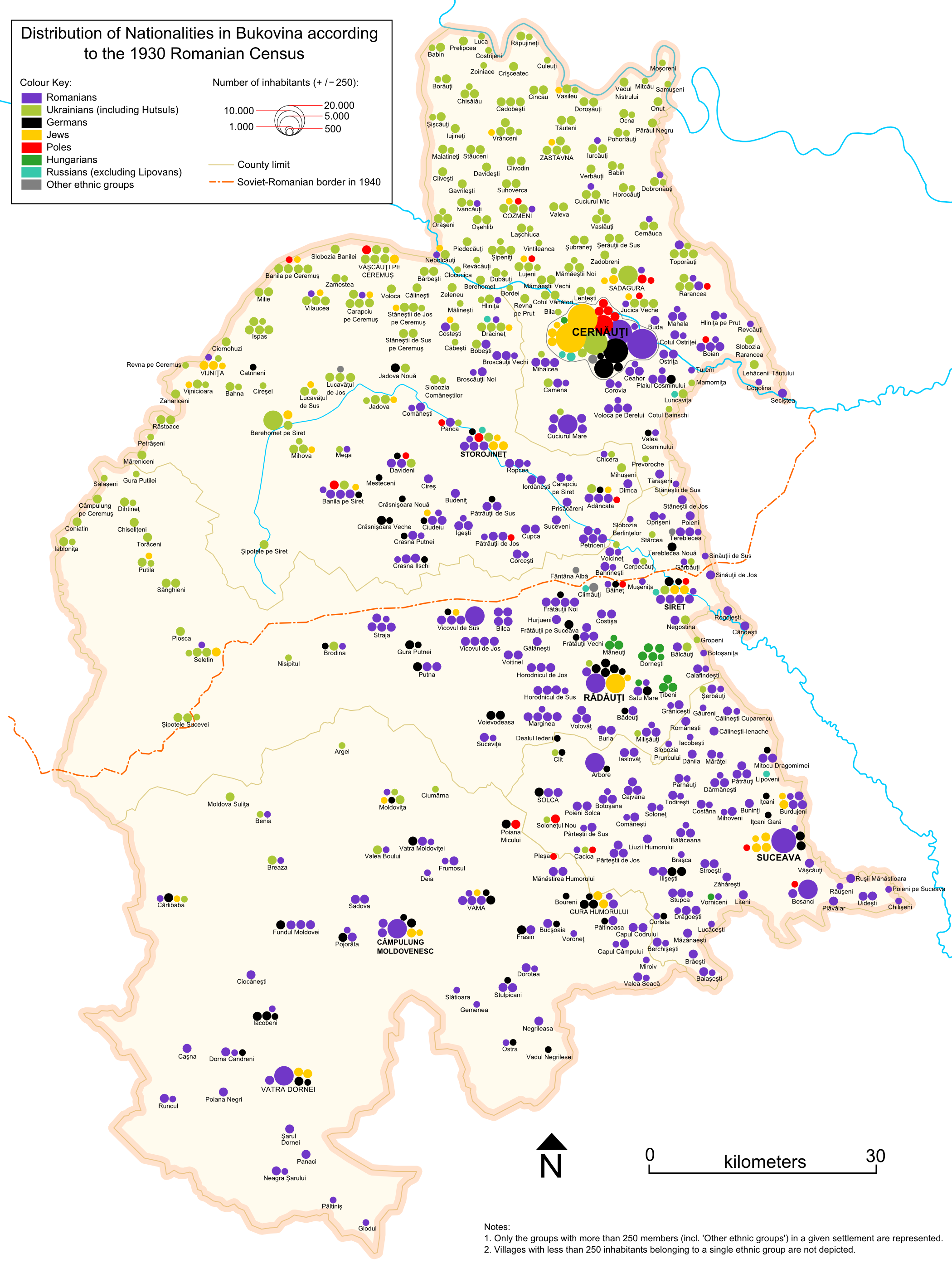
Ethnic map of Bukovina (purple = Romanians, green = Ukrainians)

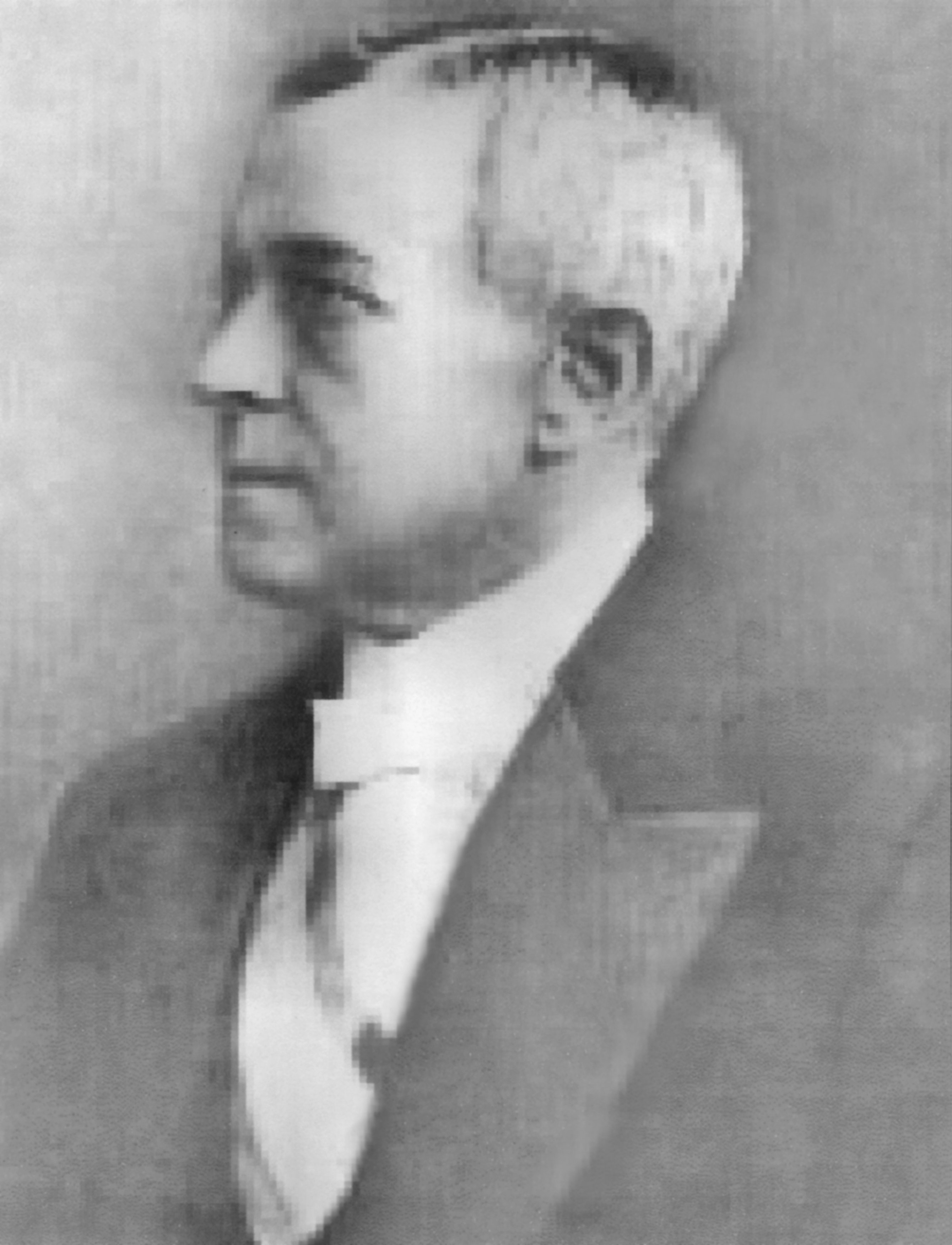
Iancu Flondor

== See also ==
- Great Union
- Union of Transylvania with Romania
- Union of Bessarabia with Romania
- Greater Romania
- Romanian occupation of Pokuttia
- Soviet occupation of Bessarabia and Northern Bukovina
