= Eduard Fischer (general) =

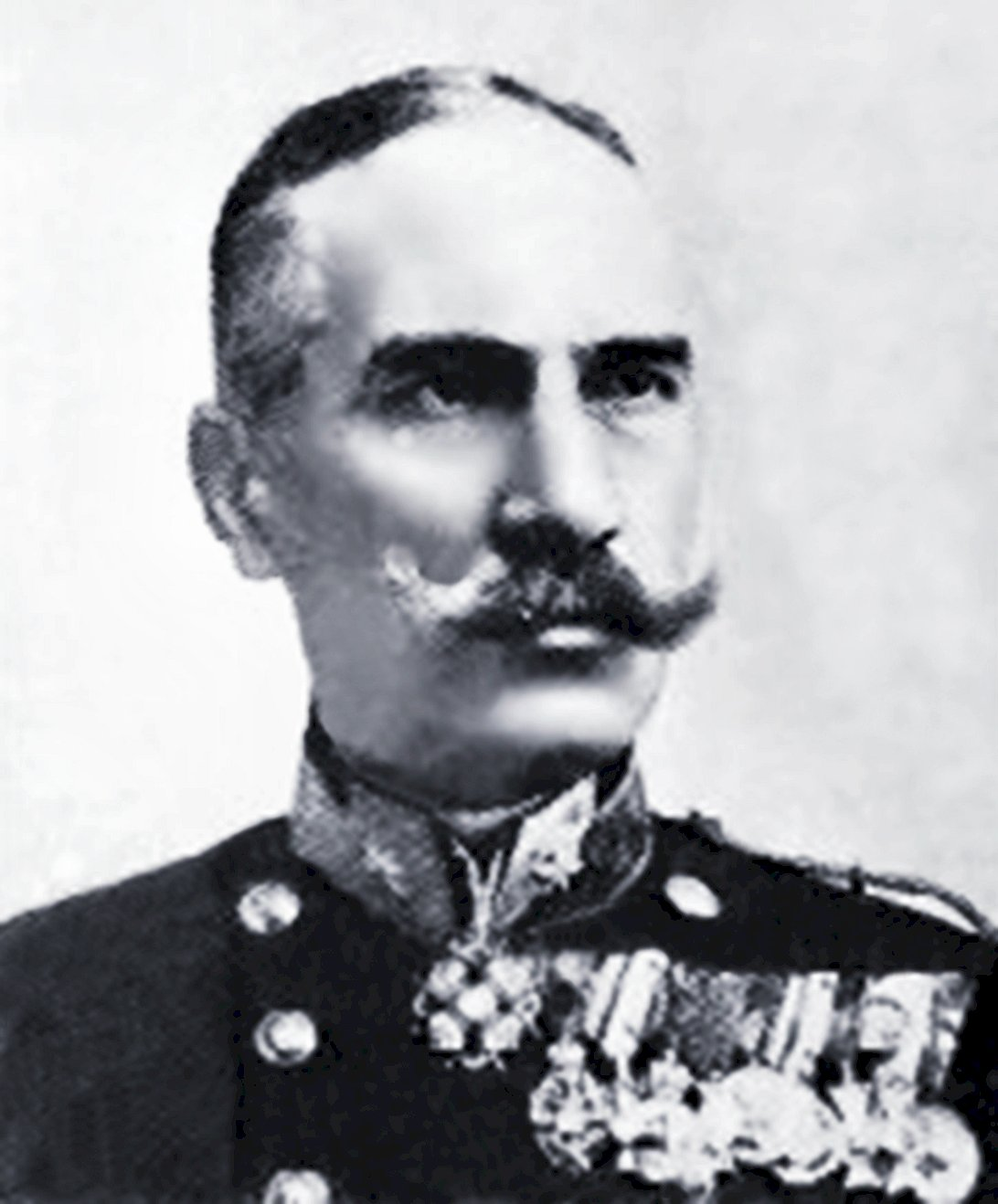
Eduard Fischer

Major General Dr. h. c. Eduard Fischer, 1862–1935, Knight of the Maria Theresa Order, was a colonel (later Gendarmerie major general) commanding the Austrian gendarmerie in Bukovina. With the outbreak of World War I, Bukovina (then part of Austro-Hungary) was immediately under siege by the Russian armies. The north of Bukovina and Czernowitz, the capital, fell within a month.

Meanwhile, in the unoccupied part of southern Bukovina, an armed resistance group was formed under the command of Colonel Eduard Fischer. His army included many volunteers in addition to the gendarmerie forces. The key points of resistance were Gura Humora and Kimpulung. Fischer fended off the enemy forces, and retook the capital, but only for a short time. The Russians occupied Czernowitz once again on November 20, 1914. He is buried in Vienna, in the cemetery Hietzing, in a grave of honour, Group 49, Number 234.

== Books ==
- Fischer, Eduard (1935). Krieg ohne Heer : meine Verteidigung der Bukowina gegen die Russen (War without an Army) (in German). Vienna: Franz Schubert; Josef Lenobel. ISBN 0-01-146151-9. OCLC 67238475.
- Едуард Фішер. Війна без армії. Моя оборона Буковини проти росіян / Едуард Фішер; пер. з нім., коментарі та епілог Володимира Заполовського. Чернівці: Книги - XXI, 2019.
