= General Congress of Bukovina =

Representative body of Bukovina prior to unification with Romania

General Congress of Bukovina Congresul General al Bucovinei

Type
- Type: Unicameral

Leadership
- President: Iancu Flondor
- Seats: 100

Meeting place
- Czernowitz

The General Congress of Bukovina (Romanian: Congresul General al Bucovinei) was a self-proclaimed representative body created in the aftermath of the Romanian military intervention in Bukovina, which proclaimed the union of the region with the Kingdom of Romania in 1918.

On 28 November 1918, the Congress elected Iancu Flondor as chairman, and voted for the union with the Kingdom of Romania, with the full support of the Romanian, German, and Polish representatives; the Ukrainians did not want to participate. The Jewish National Council, led by Benno Straucher, Mayer Ebner and Iacob Pistiner also refused to participat in the Congress, although the Jewish communities of Suceava, Câmpulung Moldovenesc and Rădăuți supported the union with Romania.

There were six Polish representatives: Bazyl Duzinkiewicz, Emil Kaminski, Stanisław (Stanislaus) Kwiatkowski, Wladislaw Pospiszil, Leopold Szweiger, and Edmund Wicentowicz. Among the Romanian representatives there were Iancu Flondor, Vladimir de Repta, Dionisie Bejan, Ion Nistor, Octavian Gheorghian, Radu Sbiera, Vasile Bodnarescu, Gheorghe Şandru, Vasile Marcu, Dimitrie Bucevschi, Gheorghe Voicu, Vasile Alboi-Şandru, Ion Candrea. The German representatives were: Rudolf Gaisdorf, Viktor Glondys, Adam Hodel, Rafael Kaindl, Edwin Landwehr de Pragenau, Alois Lebouton, and Emil Wellisch.

The Congress unanimously passed a motion which mentioned:

'We, the General Congress of Bukovina, embodying the country's supreme power and being by ourselves invested with legislative power, in the name of national sovereignty, we are deciding: The unconditional and eternal union of Bukovina - within its old boundaries up to the rivers Ceremuş, Colacin, and Dniester - with the Kingdom of Romania.'

On 28 November 1918, the General Congress of Bukovina cabled to the ministers of the Entente Powers, informing London, Washington, Paris, and Rome about the union with Romania.

== See also ==
- Union of Bukovina with Romania
