= Edward F. Fischer =

American academic

Edward F. Fischer is a professor of anthropology at Vanderbilt University who writes on political economy, development, and culture. He is a cited expert on well-being, the Maya of Guatemala, and the German social economy.

== Biography ==
Fischer holds a Bachelor of Arts degree from the University of Alabama at Birmingham along with a Master of Arts and Ph.D. from Tulane University. He currently directs the Vanderbilt Center for Latin American Studies.

== Academic work ==
Fischer has written numerous books, including: Cultural Logics and Global Economies (a 2002 Choice Outstanding Academic Title), Broccoli and Desire, and Cash on the Table. He starred in The Teaching Company's Great Course series “Peoples and Cultures of the World,” has been featured on BigThink.com, and is often cited in media outlets. He was the executive producer of the film Música Campesina by Alberto Fuguet.

In 2009, Fischer founded Maní+, a social enterprise in Guatemala that develops and produces locally sourced complementary foods to fight malnutrition. He also consults with private companies and public agencies.

== Selected bibliography ==
- (with R. McKenna Brown) (1997). Maya Cultural Activism in Guatemala. Austin, TX: University of Texas Press. pp. 255 pages. ISBN 0292708513.
- (with Carol Hendrickson) (2002). Tecpan Guatemala: A Modern Maya Town In Global And Local Context. Boulder, CO: Westview Press. pp. 184 pages. ISBN 0813337224.
- (2002). Cultural Logics and Global Economies: Maya Identity in Thought and Practice. Austin, TX: University of Texas Press. pp. 303 pages. ISBN 0292725345.
- (2004) Peoples and Cultures of the World: The Great Courses. Chantilly, VA: The Teaching Company. ISBN 1565859200.
- (with John M. Watanabe) (2004). Pluralizing Ethnography: Comparison and Representation in Maya Cultures, Histories, and Identities. Santa Fe, NM: School of American Research Press. pp. 370 pages. ISBN 1930618352.
- (with Peter Benson) (2006). Broccoli and Desire: Global Connections and Maya Struggles in Postwar Guatemala. Stanford, CA: Stanford University Press. pp. 224 pages. ISBN 0804754845.
- (with others) (2008). Of Rage and Redemption: The Art of Oswaldo Guayasamin. Nashville, TN: Vanderbilt University. pp. 99 pages. ISBN 0615187013.
- (2008). Indigenous Peoples, Civil Society, and the Neo-liberal State in Latin America. Oxford and New York: Berghahn Books. pp. 224 pages. ISBN 1845455975.
- (2013). Cash on the Table: Markets, Values and Moral Economies. Santa Fe, NM: School of American Research Press. pp. 275 pages. ISBN 1938645006.
