= Zotta =

Zotta is a surname. Notable people with the surname include:

- Mario Zotta (1904–1963), Italian politician
- Iancu Zotta
- Ovidiu Zotta (1935–1996), Romanian writer, editor, and comic strip designer
- Sever Zotta (1874–1943), Romanian archivist, genealogist, historian, and publicist
