= Historical regions in present-day Ukraine =

Traditional regions

This is a list of historical regions in present-day Ukraine.

== Main historical regions ==
| Name | Description |
|---|---|
| Black Sea Littoral | Other names: Yedisan, Ochakov Oblast, Khanschyna, Ottoman Ukraine. |
| Budjak | name originated from Turkish, meaning "borderland” |
| Bukovyna | Other names: Shypyntsi Land. |
| Donbas | Other names: Donechchyna |
| Halychyna | Other names: Galicia, Cis–Carpathian (east of the ridge). |
| Kyiv land | Other names: Duchy of Ruthenia, Ruthenia proper. |
| Siveria | Other names: Chernihiv land, Chernihiv-Siveria. |
| Podolia | Podolia means "Lower Land". |
| Sloboda Ukraine | Other names: Slobozhanshchyna |
| Taurida | Now Crimea |
| Trans– Carpathia | Carpathian region beyond the main Carpathian ridge (west of the ridge). Other names: Carpathian Ruthenia, Carpathian Ukraine, Carpatho-Ukraine, Sub-Carpathian Ruthenia, Sub-Carpathia, Trans-Carpathian Ukraine, Zakarpattia. |
| Volhynia | Other names: Volodymyr, Volyn, Lodomeria. |
| Zaporizhian Sich | |

== Traditional regions ==
The traditional names of the regions of Ukraine are important geographic, historical, and ethnographic identifiers.

- Dnieper Ukraine, or Great Ukraine
  - Land of Kyiv
    - Right-bank Ukraine (east of Zhytomyr Oblast, Kyiv Oblast, Cherkasy Oblast), Central Ukraine
    - Polesia, Land of Turov (north of Kyiv Oblast, east of Brest Oblast, west of Gomel Oblast), Northern Ukraine
  - Land of Pereiaslav (predominantly Poltava Oblast and east of Kyiv Oblast), southern part of Left-bank Ukraine, Little Russia, Central Ukraine
  - Land of Chernihiv-Siveria (Chernihiv Oblast, northwest of Sumy oblast, west of Bryansk Oblast, east of Gomel Oblast), northern part of Left-bank Ukraine, Little Russia, Northern Ukraine
- Ruthenia, Kingdom of Rus, Western Ukraine, Western Oblast, Lesser Poland
  - Volhynia (Volyn Oblast, Rivne Oblast, west of Zhytomyr Oblast, north of Ternopil Oblast, north of Khmelnytskyi Oblast), former principality
  - Chełm, Belz, San River, Przemyśl (east of Podkarpackie Voivodeship and Lublin Voivodeship), former principality and a constituent land of Ruthenia
  - Berestia (west of Brest Oblast, south of Podlaskie Voivodeship)
  - Galicia (Lviv Oblast, Ivano-Frankivsk Oblast, Ternopil Oblast)
    - Red Ruthenia
    - Prykarpattia (Boikos and Lemkos, collectively Rusyns)
    - Pokuttia (Hutsuls)
- Podolia (Khmelnytskyi Oblast, Vinnytsia Oblast, north of Odesa Oblast, west of Kirovohrad Oblast), Lesser Poland
- Sloboda Ukraine (South of Sumy Oblast, Kharkiv Oblast, east Belgorod Oblast, south-east of Voronezh Oblast)
- Zaporizhzhia (Dnipropetrovsk Oblast, most of Kirovohrad Oblast), New Serbia, Central Ukraine
- Pontic steppe, Wild Fields, New Russia
  - Donbas ("Donets Basin") (Donetsk Oblast, Luhanks Oblast), also known as Cuman Land, Slavo-Serbia, Eastern Ukraine
  - Azov Littoral (Zaporizhzhia Oblast, south of Donetsk Oblast, southwest of Rostov Oblast)
  - Black Sea Littoral, Southern Ukraine
    - Over-Buh, Yedisan, Transnistria (Odesa Oblast, Mykolaiv Oblast)
    - Bugeac (Budzhak/Bujak) (southwest of Odesa Oblast)
    - Tavria (Kherson Oblast)
- Crimea (Krym), also known as Tavria, Taurida
- Transcarpathia / Carpathian Ruthenia, Subcarpathian Rus, Carpatho-Ukraine and many others
  - Maramureș
- Northern Bukovina (Chernivtsi Oblast)

== Contemporary regions ==
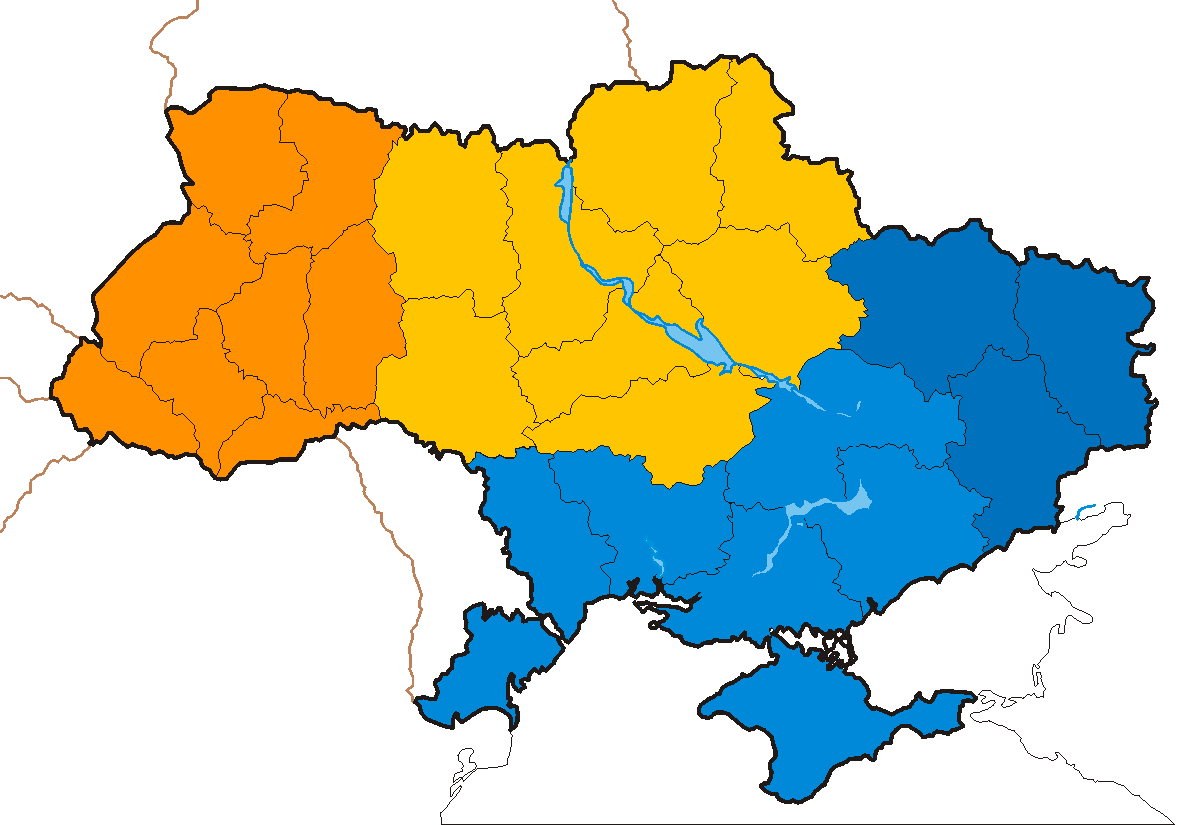
Gold – Central Ukraine Blue – Eastern Ukraine Light blue – Southern Ukraine Orange – Western Ukraine Sometimes, more southern oblasts can be referred to as "Eastern Ukraine".

Geopolitical, historical, and cultural factors play a role in assigning different areas of Ukraine to semi-official regions. The map on the right shows the approximate locations of some broad-brush regions. The terms "Central Ukraine", "Eastern Ukraine", "Southern Ukraine", and "Western Ukraine" occur in common usage. There is no clear definition of the boundaries of such regions, but rather a general reference. Lists of what may constitute such regions might include:

- Central Ukraine, a more vague term, often denotes what is not included in Western or South-Eastern definitions.
- Eastern Ukraine may mean either the Don basin, Sloboda Ukraine, continental Taurida regions etc.
- Southern Ukraine often includes the whole Taurida, the Kryvyi Rih basin, and the regions of Mykolayiv and Odesa oblasts. Alternatively it may include the Don basin, in particularly the adjacent land to the Azov Sea.
- Western Ukraine may mean either the historic region of Galicia, or may also include Volhynia, Podolia, Transcarpathia, and/or Bukovina.

Other terms are rarely used – such as "South-western Ukraine", which can denote either Transcarpathia, or Budjak. Sometimes the term "South-eastern Ukraine" is used to define both regions of the Southern and Eastern Ukraine. Due to the shape of the country, in narrow definition, term "Northern Ukraine" is often used to denote either the bulge of Chernihiv/Sumy oblasts or, in broader terms, the whole of Polesia. "North-western Ukraine" almost exclusively refers to the historic region of Volhynia. This makes the term "North-eastern Ukraine" rarest of them all – it is either used as synonym for the narrow definition of Northern Ukraine, or as synonym for Sloboda Ukraine (particularly Sumy Oblast).

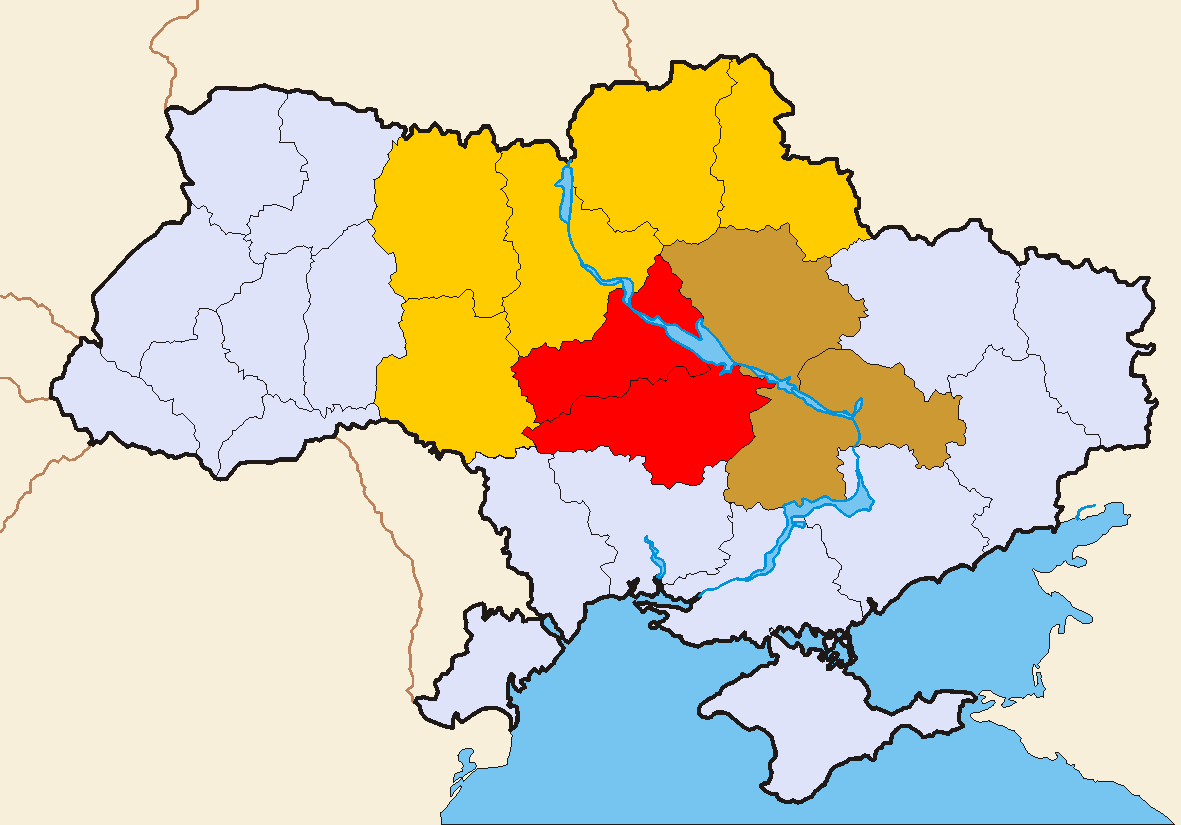
Central Ukraine

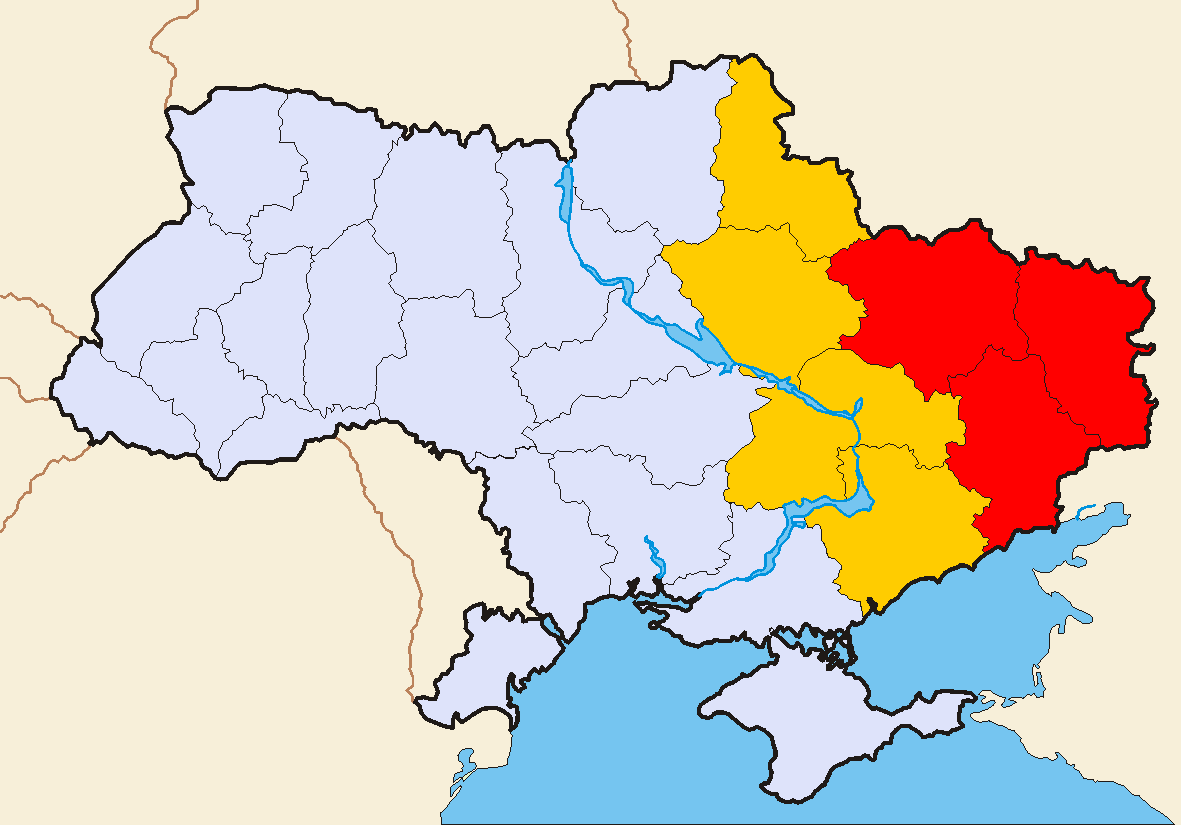
Eastern Ukraine

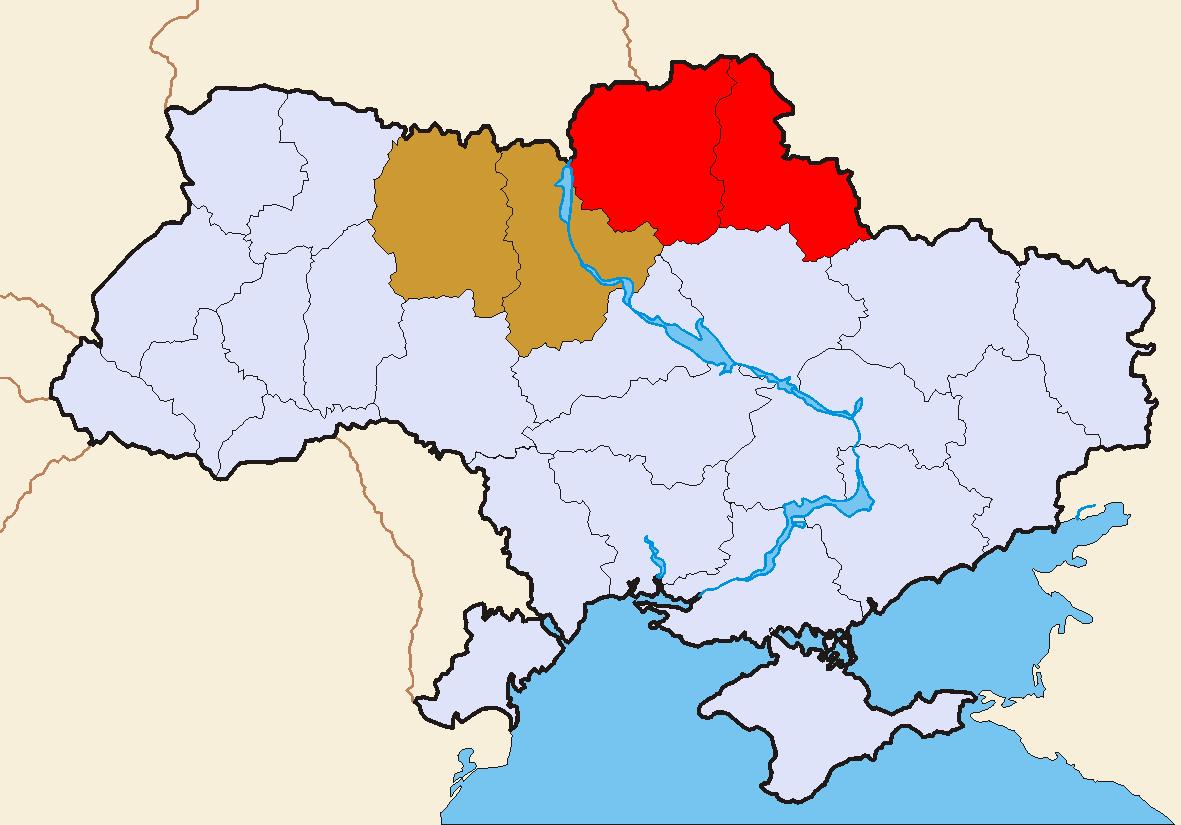
Northern Ukraine

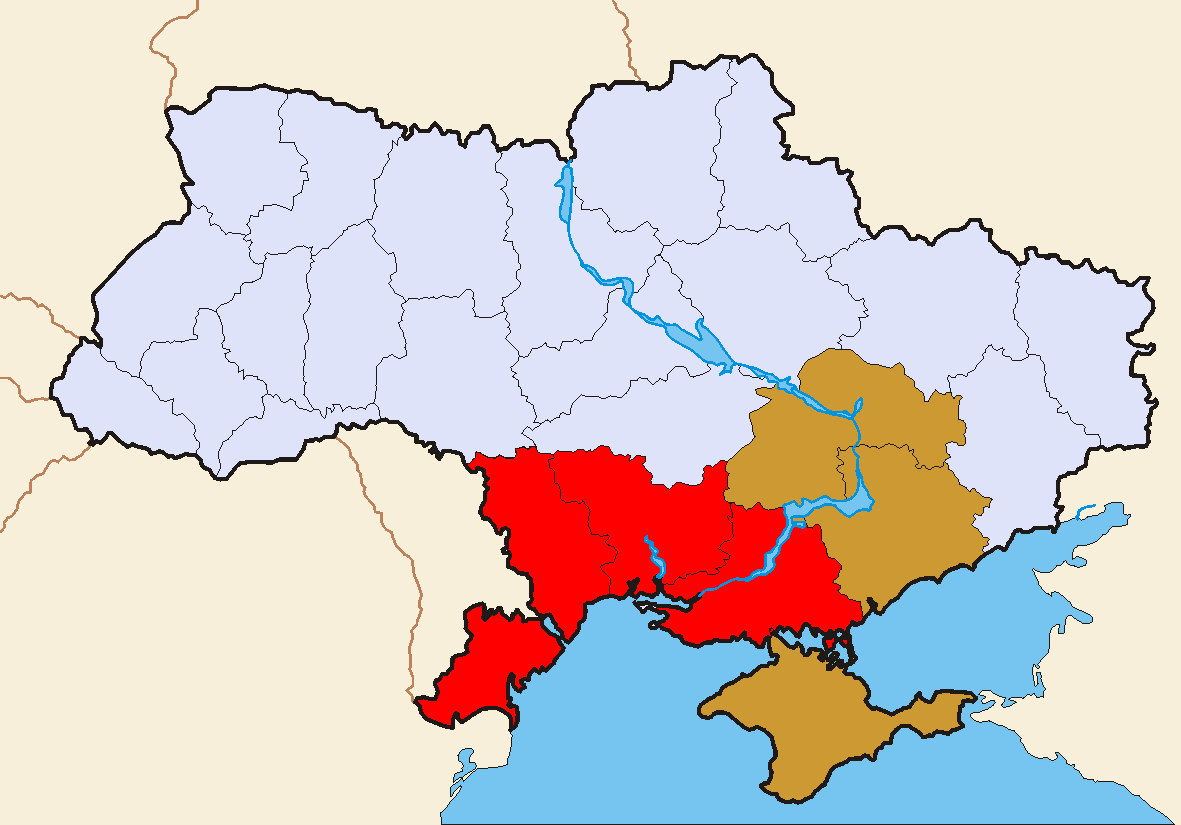
Southern Ukraine

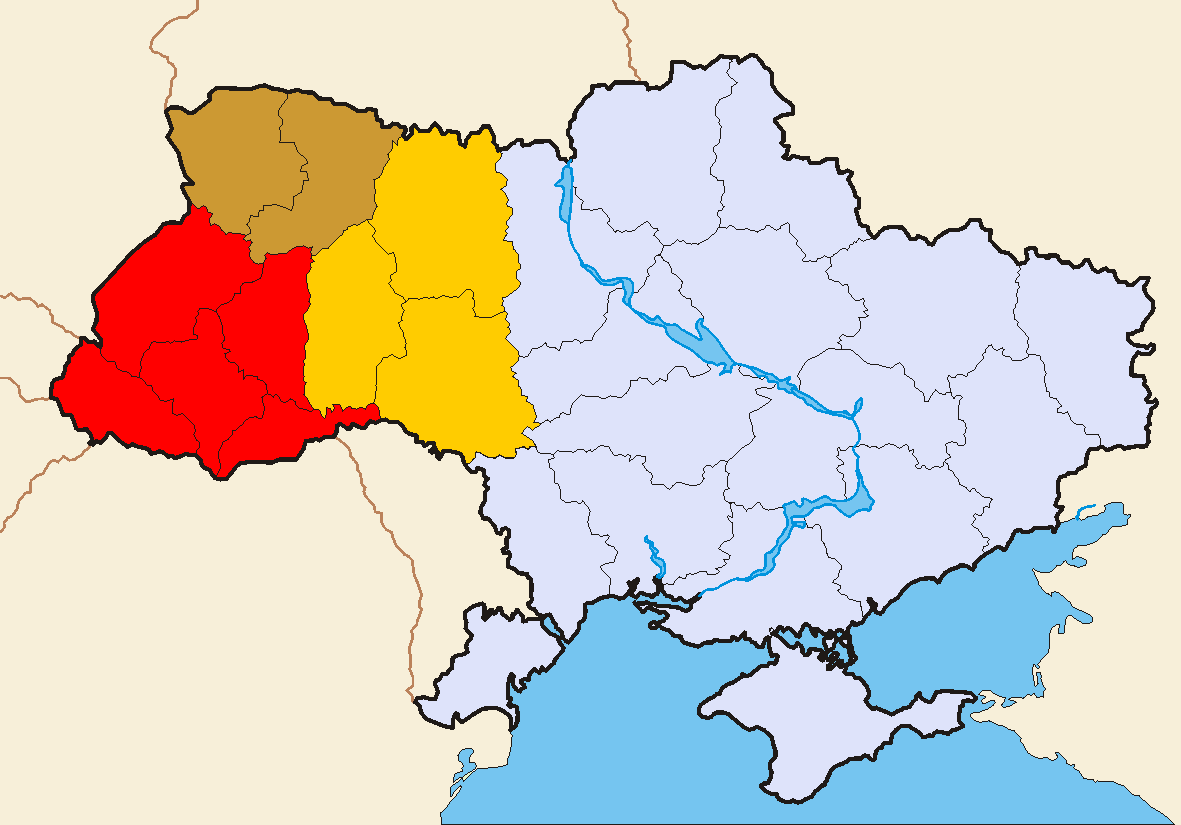
Western Ukraine

== Historical states ==
- Kievan Rus (a state of Early East Slavs), (879–1240)
- Kingdom of Galicia–Volhynia (1199–1349)
- Cossack Hetmanate (1649–1764)
- Central Rada of the Ukrainian People's Republic (1917–1918)
- Ukrainian People's Republic of Soviets (1917–1918)
- Odesa Soviet Republic (1918)
- Donetsk–Krivoy Rog Soviet Republic (1918)
- Ukrainian Soviet Republic (1918)
- Hetmanate of the Ukrainian State (1918)
- West Ukrainian People's Republic (1918–1919)
- Kholodny Yar Republic (1919-1922)
- Directorate of the Ukrainian People's Republic (1918–1920)
- Ukrainian Soviet Socialist Republic (1919–1991)
- Galician Soviet Socialist Republic (1920)
- Carpatho-Ukraine (1938–1939)
- Ukrainian national government (1941)
- Reichskommissariat Ukraine (1941-1944)
- Ukraine (1991–present)

== See also ==
- Geography of Ukraine
- ISO 3166-2:UA
- List of places named after people (Ukraine)
