= Alexander Kozulin =

Alexander Kozulin or Aleksandr Kozulin or Alyaksandr Kazulin may refer to the following notable people:

- Alyaksandr Kazulin (born 1955), Belarusian politician
- Alexander Kozulin (pianist) (born 1955), Ukrainian pianist and composer
