= Ioan Țurcan =

Romanian Orthodox priest and politician

Ioan Țurcan (Țurcanovici until 1882; April 19, 1818–May 6, 1902) was an ethnic Romanian Orthodox priest and politician in Austria-Hungary, in the Duchy of Bukovina.

Born in Crișceatic, a village near Coțmani, his father Gheorghe was a priest. He attended the German Realschule (1831-1839) and the theological institute (graduated 1843) at Cernăuți. He attended specialty courses at the Roman Catholic theology faculty of Vienna University, obtaining a doctorate in 1844. He became assistant priest at Șipeniț (1844) and priest at Mămăeștii Vechi (1845), where he founded a school and maintained it with his own funds from 1874 to 1890. He later started preaching at Cernăuți Cathedral, being named archpriest in 1874. He retired in 1897. He was an adviser to the metropolitan from 1857 to 1897.

In 1892, Țurcan was a founding member of the Romanian National Party, and of the National People's Party in 1897. He served in the Diet of Bukovina from 1878 to 1902 and in the Austrian House of Deputies from 1891 to 1900. He was known for his repeated interventions on behalf of education and the church in Bukovina. A prominent member of Societatea Academică Junimea, in 1898 he became the first president of the Association of Greek-Orthodox Priests from Bukovina. Some of his speeches were published in Candela magazine, and he supported the establishment of a school for girls in Cernăuți, where he died. He never married.
