= Sidonie Matsner Gruenberg =

Director of the Child Study Association of America

Sidonie Gruenberg
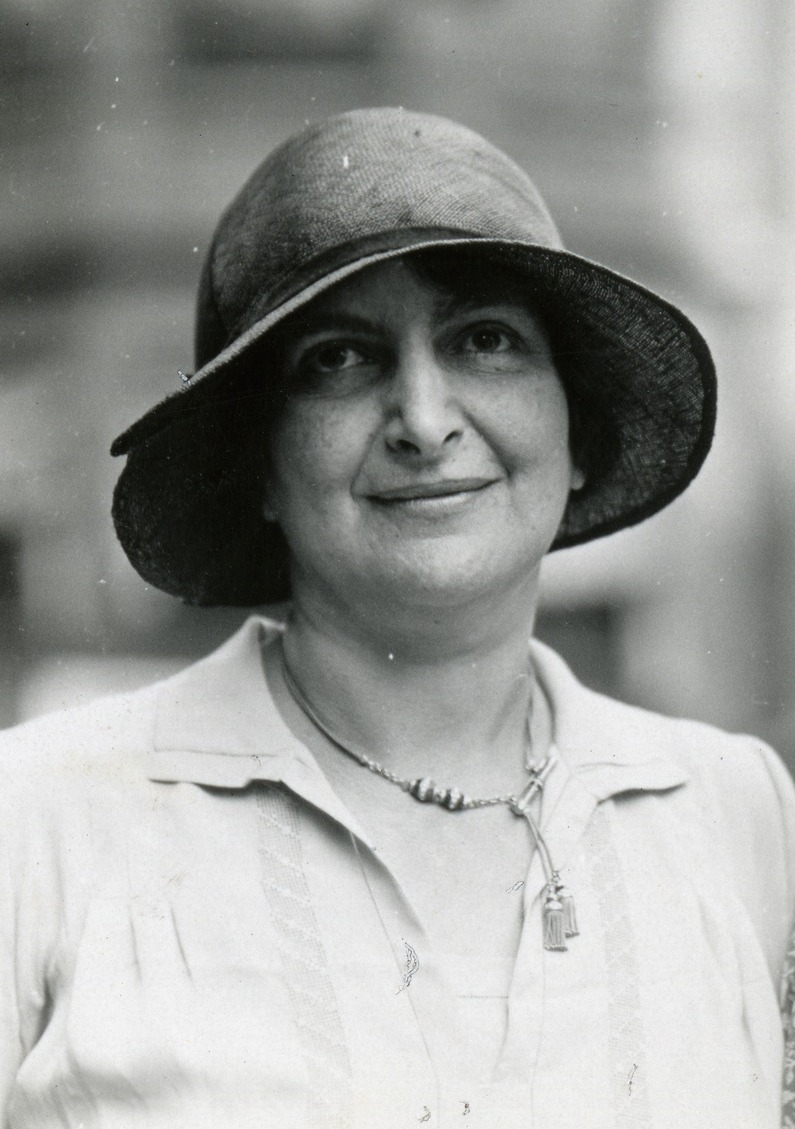
- Gruenberg c. 1940
- Born: 1881
- Died: 1974 (aged 92–93)
- Citizenship: American
- Spouse: Benjamin Gruenberg
- Writing career
- Notable works: Your Child Today and Tomorrow
- Literary movement: Child Study Association of America

Sidonie Matsner Gruenberg (1881–1974) was a parenting expert, writer, and director of the Child Study Association of America.

In her 1912 book Your Child Today and Tomorrow, Gruenberg popularized the idea of giving an allowance to children so they could understand how to spend it.

== Life ==
Sidonie Gruenberg was born in Austria and educated in Germany and New York City. She married Benjamin Gruenberg, a biology teacher, in 1903, and had four children between 1907–1915: Herbert, Richard, Hilda, and Ernest.

In her parenting books, she said that children do not have any moral actions, so parents should permit actions to help them grow in their individual expression. Gruenberg rejected what she saw as "arbitrary puritanism" in American parenting, saying that strict parents suggest "every desire and impulse of being Satanic." On behalf of Macy's, she lectured at an exposition on "why children should have toys" in 1928.
