= Iancu Zotta =

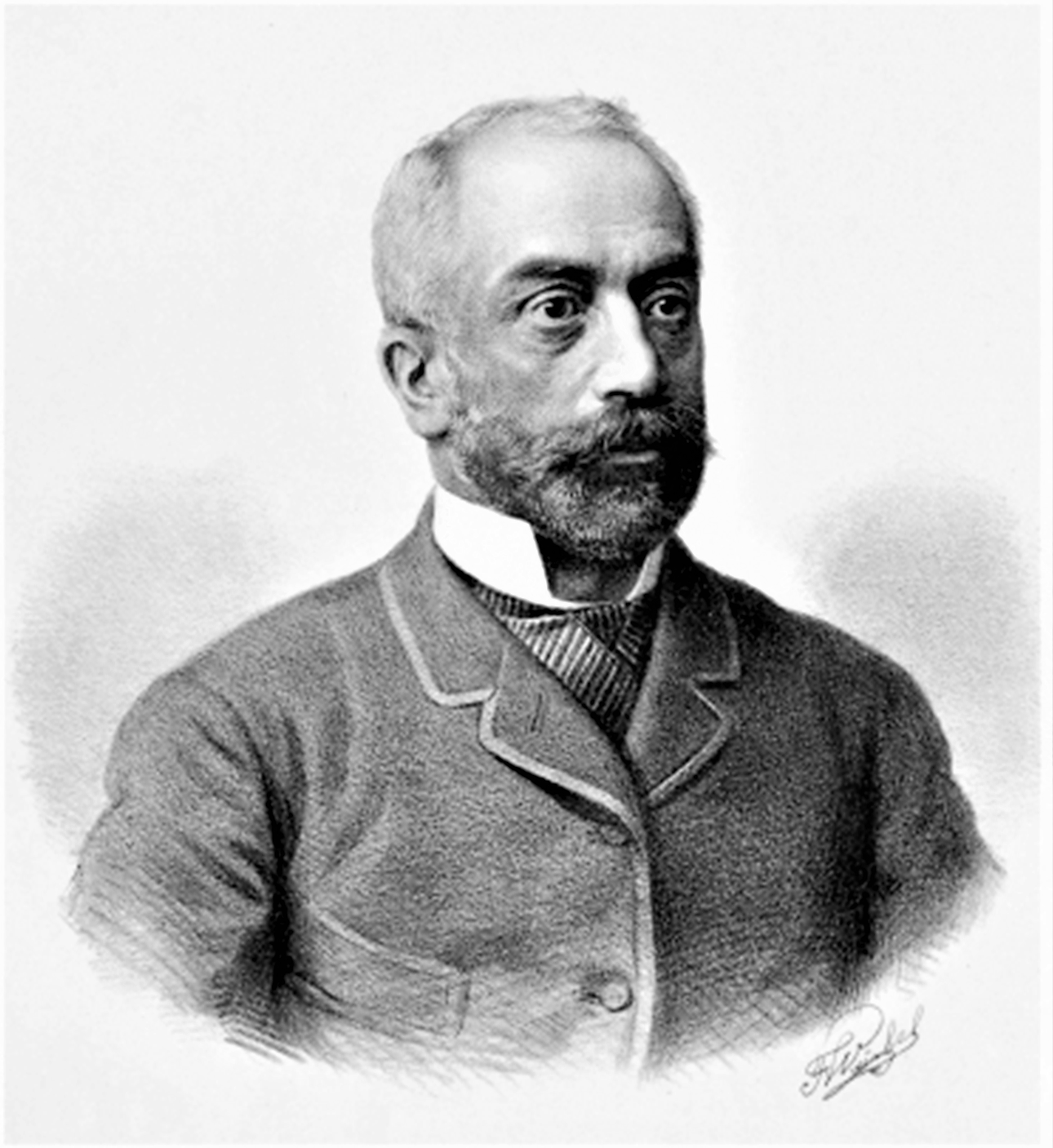
Iancu Zotta

Iancu Zotta (1840 – March 19 [O.S. March 7] 1896) was an ethnic Romanian politician in Bukovina, within Austria-Hungary.

He was born in Chisălău, near Coțmani in the Duchy of Bukovina, which is now known as Kyseliv, Kitsman raion, Chernivsti oblast, Ukraine. His father Ștefan was a landowner; Iancu would later own estates at Chisălău and Noua Suliță. He attended high school in Cernăuți, graduating in 1859. He then entered Vienna University, studying law and politics from 1859 to 1863. He obtained a doctorate in law in 1866. He then worked as a civil servant in his native province until 1867, when he resigned and entered politics.

He was married to Elena, the daughter of Gheorghe Hurmuzachi and Eufrosina (née Flondor); the couple had one daughter and two sons, including Sever Zotta, before her death in 1876.

Zotta participated in the various cultural and political movements of the Bukovina Romanians, supporting many of them financially. In 1888, he headed the Society for Romanian Culture and Literature in Bukovina. He served in the Diet of Bukovina in 1876 and 1879–1890, and in the House of Deputies (1879–1891). He was vice president (1890) and president (1891–1895) of the Concordia political society, which would develop into the Romanian National Party of Bukovina.

He died in Noua Suliță and was buried in his native village three days later.

== Controversies ==
Iancu Zotta was the prosecutor who, in 1877, investigated Ciprian Porumbescu and the leading Arboroasa figures, on charges of irredentism and treason against Austria-Hungary. While all the defendants were found not guilty, during his arrest, Porumbescu contracted tuberculosis, leading to his early death.
