= Benjamin Charles Gruenberg =

Russian-born American biology educator and writer

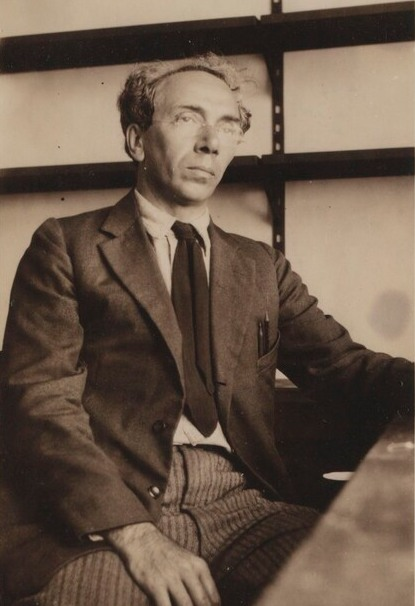
Gruenberg in 1922

Benjamin Charles Gruenberg (15 August 1875 – 1 July 1965) was a Russian-born American biology educator and writer. He was involved in establishing high school biology curricula for New York high schools and sex education in the United States.

== Life and work ==
Gruenberg was born in Novoselytsia, Bessarabia Governorate, Russian Empire (now in Ukraine), and after his Jewish parents emigrated to the US he received his BS from the University of Minnesota in 1896. He worked briefly as a chemist involved in the sugar industry. In 1902 he became an instructor in biology in the New York City public high schools. In 1903 he married Sidonie Matsner. She was a specialist in child development and was involved in the Child Study Association of America. She later became a Fellow of the AAAS.

In 1908 Gruenberg received a master's degree in genetics from Columbia University after which he taught biology at Commercial High School. In 1911 he received a PhD from Columbia University under Thomas Hunt Morgan after which he taught at Julia Richman High School. From 1920 he was involved in sex education under the Bureau of Education in the US schools. In 1925 he wrote a textbook on biology and human life. He was also a managing editor for The American Teacher which he helped found in 1911. He wrote a textbook on biology in 1919 in which he removed the traditional separation of botany and zoology and focused on social applications.

From 1925 he became a director for the American Association for Medical Progress. He lectured widely and wrote for children as well as for educators. In 1929 he became an editor for Viking Press and was involved in getting scientists to write books for ordinary readers. Clarence Darrow, an attorney in the Scopes trial in 1925 requested Gruenberg to attend as an expert witness but he was advised by an editor of a textbook that was under preparation not to get involved.
