= Allowance (money) =

Amount of money given or allotted at regular intervals for a specific purpose

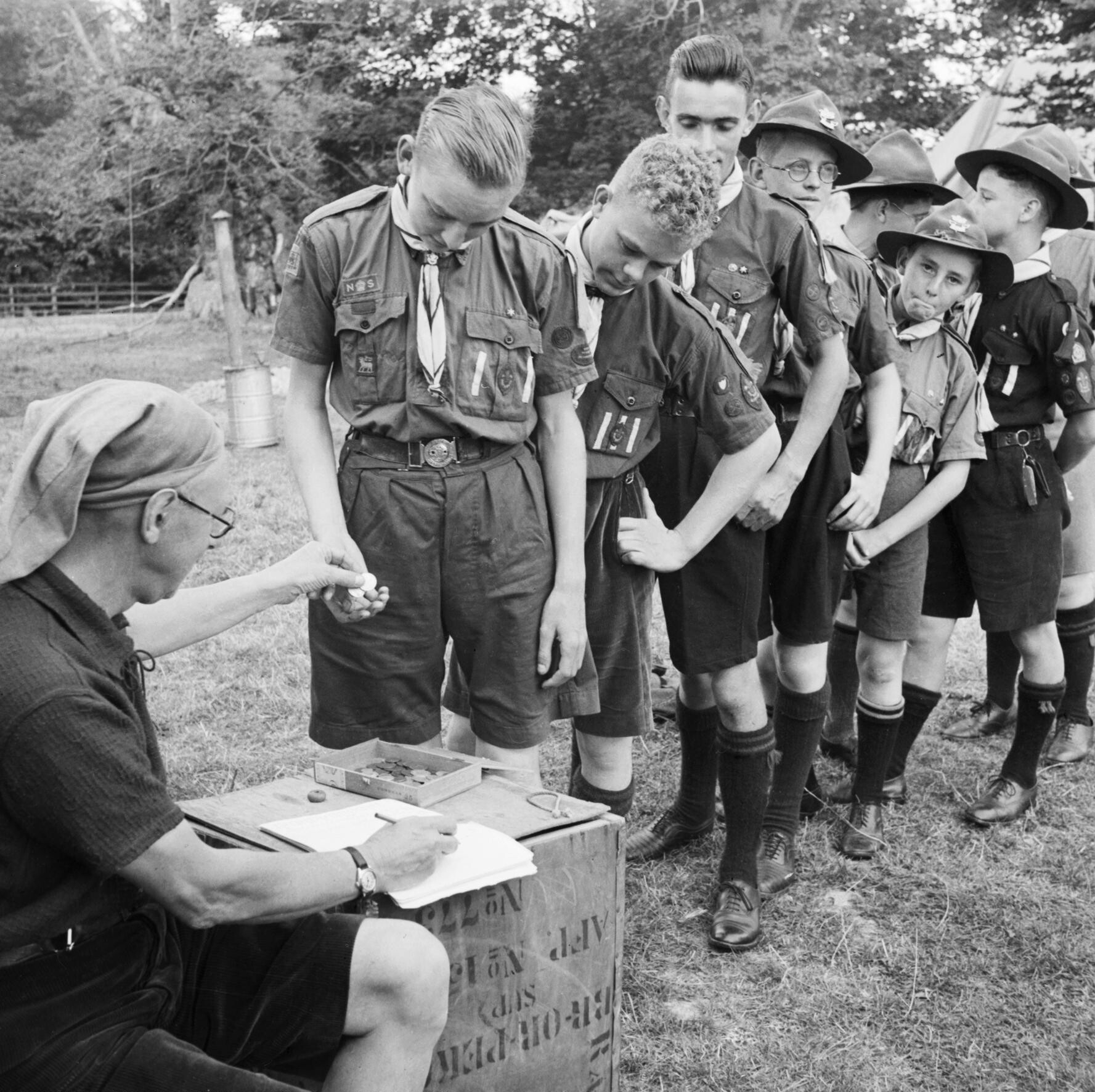
British Boy Scouts receiving their allowances at a fruit picking camp near Cambridge, England in 1943

An allowance is an amount of money given or allotted usually at regular intervals for a specific purpose. In the context of children, parents may provide an allowance (British English: pocket money) to their child for their miscellaneous personal spending. In the construction industry, an allowance may be an amount allocated to a specific item of work as part of an overall contract.

The person providing the allowance usually tries to control how or when money is spent by the recipient so that it meets the aims of the person providing the money. For example, a parent giving an allowance may be motivated to teach their child money management, and the allowance may be either unconditional or tied to the completion of chores or the achievement of specific grades.

The person supplying the allowance usually specifies the purpose, and may put controls in place to make sure that the money is spent only for that purpose. For example, company employees may be given an allowance or per diem to provide for meals, and travel when they work away from home, and then be required to provide receipts as proof, or they may be provided with specific non-money tokens or vouchers such as a meal voucher that can be used only for a specific purpose.

== Construction contracting ==
In construction, an allowance is an amount specified and included in the construction contract (or specifications) for a certain item of work (appliances, lighting, etc.) whose details are not yet determined at the time of contracting. These rules typically apply to:

1. The amount covers the cost of the contractor's material/equipment delivered to the project and all taxes less any trade discounts to which the contractor may be entitled with respect to the item of work.
2. The contractor's costs for labor (installation), overhead, profit, and other expenses with respect to the allowance item are included in the base contract amount but not in the allowance amount.
3. If the costs in the first section for the item of work are higher (or lower) than the allowance, the base contract is increased (decreased) by the difference in both amounts, and by the change (if any) to the contractor's costs under the second section.

The allowance provisions may be handled otherwise in the contract; for example, the flooring allowance may state that installation costs are part of the allowance. The contractor may be required to produce records of the original takeoff or estimate of the costs in the second section for each allowance item.

These issues should also be considered in the contract's allowance provision:

- May the client insist that the contractor use whomever the client wishes to do the allowance work?
- May the contractor charge the client back for any costs arising from a delay by the client (or client's agent) in selecting the material or equipment of the allowance in question?

== Children ==
Parents often give their children an allowance (British English: pocket money) for their miscellaneous personal spending, and also to teach them money management at an early age. The parenting expert Sidonie Gruenberg popularized this concept in 1912.

Usually young children get "gift" allowances. For some parents, when children are old enough to start doing chores, an allowance becomes "exchange" money. Later, as the child grows older, some parents give children projects they can choose or ignore, and this type of allowance can be called "entrepreneurial."

A 2019 study by the American Institute of Certified Public Accountants found the average allowance paid to U.S. children was $30 per week.

== Adults ==
In some countries like South Korea and Japan, it is customary for the woman to control all household finances. Any paycheck that the husband receives goes straight to the wife's bank account, and the wife usually pays around 5~10% of it as allowance to her husband.

In 2015, a court in South Korea granted an at-fault divorce (no-fault divorce is not allowed in that country) to a husband who received only 100,000 won (US$95) per month in allowance from his wife. The article stated that the husband was a professional soldier, but since his entire salary went to his wife, he had to take a second job as a construction worker to afford to buy his meals. The ruling established that an excessively-low allowance from a wife can be counted as a fault for divorce in that country.

In Japan, three quarters of men get monthly allowances from their wives. Since 1979, Shinsei Bank has been researching the amount of spending money given to husbands by their wives. In 2011 it was 39,600 yen (about US$500). (Note: The annual exchange rate in 2011 was 79.81 yen per US dollar.) That can be compared to before the Japanese asset price bubble burst, when the allowance was 76,000 yen in 1990 (US$530, (Note: The annual exchange rate for 1990 was 144.79 yen per US dollar.) equivalent to US1,280 in 2024).

== See also ==
- Per diem
- Wage
