= Paul Gore (historian) =

Bessarabian historian

Paul (Pavel) Gore
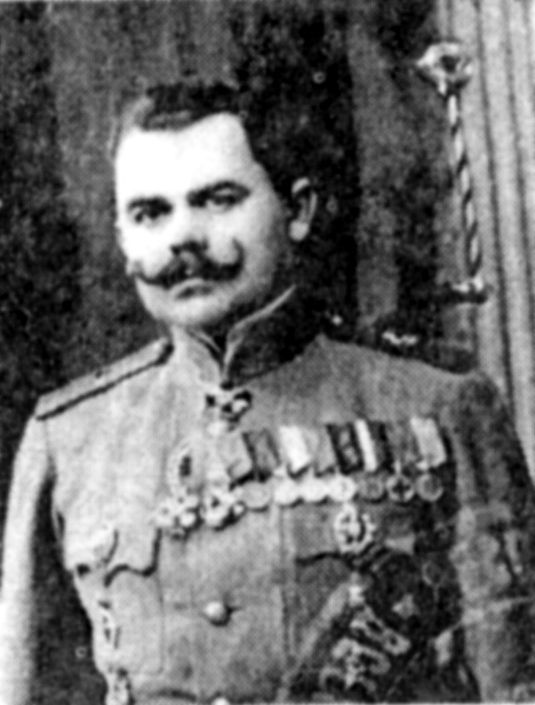

President of the National Moldavian Party
- In office 1917–1918

Personal details
- Born: 27 July 1875 Chişinău, Russian Empire
- Died: 8 December 1927 (aged 52) Chişinău, Kingdom of Romania
- Party: National Moldavian Party
- Education: Saint Petersburg State University

Paul Gore (27 July 1875, in Chişinău – 8 December 1927) was a Bessarabian politician and historian, he wrote prose and publicist materials, he was the honorary member (1919) of the Romanian Academy, he was the president of the National Moldavian Party. "Very cultured man, he owned a vast library and he knew the history of Bessarabia in detail" .

== Career ==
Paul Gore graduated from the high school in Mykolaiv, the Kherson region (1895), and then the Law School of the Saint Petersburg's University (1901). In 1905 he became a peace judge in Orgeyevsky Uyezd and in the same year he became the chairman of the editorial board of the Moldovan Society. In 1909 he became the sanitary director and director of the National Museum of Chișinău, where he have worked by 1918. In 1910 he was the elected MP from the nobility side and the vice-president of the Gubernian's Zemstvoe (zemstvo = form of local self-government). And being at this posture, in 1912, Paul Gore have asked publicly from the floor the introduction of the Romanian language in schools.

During the First World War he was the director general of the Red Cross of Bessarabia. In 1917 he became president of the newly created Moldovan school commission; on March 20 – the president of the National Moldavian Party, and on May 16 – the president of the Moldovan Cultural Society. During this period, he substituted the deputy commissioner of Bessarabia, C. A. Mimi. He was the first resident of Chișinău to hoist the flag of Romania to his residence. On June 7, 1919 he was elected honorary member of the Romanian Academy. He was the author of the works Plebiscite in Bessarabia (1919), Population of Bessarabia by nationalities according to Russian official sources (in collaboration with P. Cazacu) (1920), Self-administration and Zemstvo (1920), Bessarabia (1926). Being on the front of the first world war from the Red Cross side, he wrote the memories called Flamenco, Fragment, Abyss, Wandering (War episode: Russians at Grozești), Mosh Vranceanu , Under the impression of fire.

Within the Greater Romania, he carried out an extensive activity, becoming: chairman of the Bessarabian Historical Monuments Commission (1919), of the Cultural League, Chișinău section (1920), the member of the management committee of the Romanian Numismatic Society (1921), of the Royal Society committee Romanian Geography (1921), honorary member of the Historical-Archaeological Society of Chișinău (1921), member of the Romanian Athenaeum (1923), of the Romanian Renaissance Society, of the Prince Carol Foundation.

== Contributions in the field of heraldry and vexillology ==
Paul Gore has had in-depth education in science and art of the coat of arms, because of his education and knowledge he became a of the Heraldic Council of France, of the International Heraldic Convention in London, of the Swiss Heraldic Society, of the Adler associations in Vienna, Herold in Berlin, Sanct Michel in Bamberg, and a correspondent member of the Heraldic Academy in Madrid. Gheorghe Bezviconi testified that "Pavel Gore was the first but also the last knight of Bessarabia. By studying the past he came to a medieval and uplifting conception of chivalry, of the nation and of the blazon. Thus, he became the only herald of Bessarabia, even of all Romania".

Flag of the Moldavian Democratic Republic, which is also the coat of arms of the Republic

Under the conditions of the establishment of the National Moldovian Party in Chișinău, on April 3, 1917, Paul Gore (as president) has edited a research that was done in Russian language entitled "National colors of Romanians from Bessarabia" (remaining in the manuscript). It aims to demonstrate that the Bessarabians should use the Romanian tricolor by default:

"The certain amount of respect for the national past and only a little courage to defend your national legal rights are needed. I do not insist that our national flag composed of three blue, yellow and red colored stripes to have these strips arranged vertically. Let these strips respect the indicated order be horizontal. But their colors and their consecutiveness must be preserved, especially, as all these three colors are also in the Bessarabian Coat of Arms, which represents, if we remove the border from the colors of the Empire, the exact ancient coat of arms of the Principality of Moldova and, it is known that, the flags must be made according to the exact rules of heraldry, according to the colors of the field and the emblems of the corresponding Coat of Arms."

To this extent, the heraldist Silviu Andrieș-Tabac considers Gore the moral author of the coat of arms and flag of the Moldavian Democratic Republic, mainly due to the fact that "Paul Gore had the real opportunity to influence the opinion of the revolutionary and public elite. [...] Only a professional heraldist of his waist could find a formula to expresses in heraldic language the liberation of the Moldovan province [...] under the domination of Romanov emperors and, at the same time, he knew (was familiar) how the old coat of arms of the Principality of Moldova was looked like.

In 1922, the Heraldic Advisory Commission was set up, under the chairmanship of Dimitrie Onciul. Paul Gore was among the first members. Being the member he proposed several designs of the coat of arms of Greater Romania. The weapons adopted were based on his idea. But also in 1922, Gore was named the director of the museum and chairman of the Chișinău State Archives Commission, and because of the tasks imposed he missed several meetings of the Heraldic Advisory Commission. After his death, in 1928, George D. Florescu has replaced him in the Commission.

== Works ==
- Note on those of good faith from Bessarabia (1908);
- The Boyars rights (1911);
- Album of Moldovan carpet ornaments (1912);
- Plebiscite in Bessarabia (1919);
- Self-administration and Zemstvo (1920);
- The chrysanthemum at the border, in the Interwar prose of Bessarabia, ingr. and pref. Veronica Bâtcă, Bucharest, 63-72 (1996).

He also, has edited researches and articles in:

- Literary Talks;
- Historical Magazine;
- The Romanian Life;
- Democracy;
- The Magazine of Archives;
- Bessarabia.

Has passed awayDeathl Gore died in 8 December 1927. He was buried in the cemetery of the St. Elijah church in Chișinău, which was later demolished. Sever Zotta considered him a "noble without truffles, a proud but righteous noble, a wise and modest scholar, a good and merciful man, a sincere and faithful friend, a devout Christian and a mystical monarchist, a rare manifestation of the genius of our race and the last knight of Bessarabia"

== Gallery ==
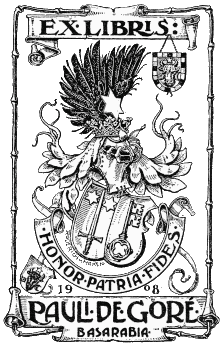
Ex libris, 1908

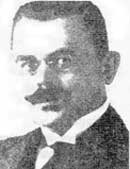

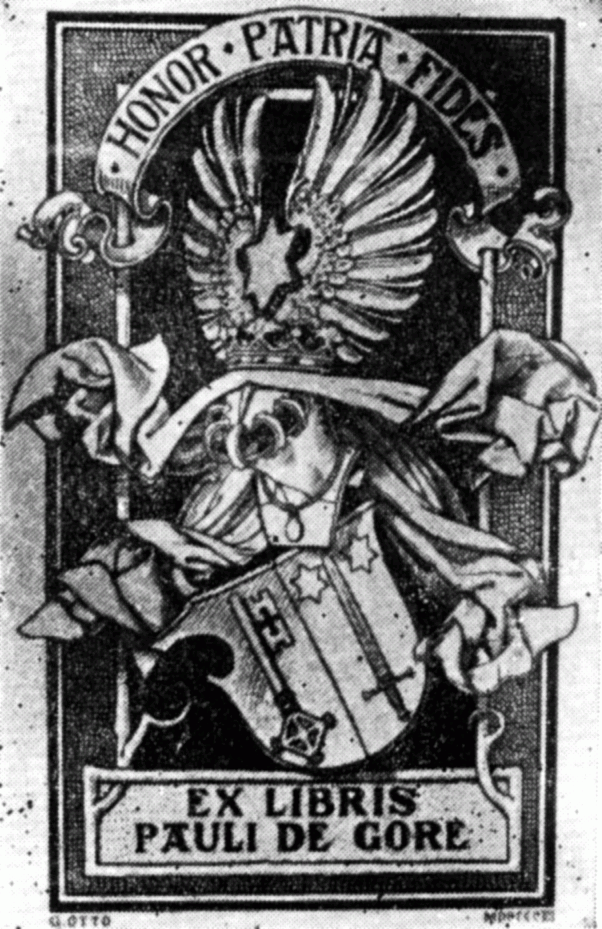

== Bibliography ==
- Silviu Andrieş-Tabac, Heraldica teritorială a Basarabiei şi Transnistriei, Ed. Museum, Chişinău, 1998.
- Dan Cernovodeanu, Ştiinţa şi arta heraldică în România, Ed. Ştiinţifică şi Enciclopedică, București, 1977.
- Iurie Coleşnic, Basarabia necunoscută, Chişinău, 1993.
- Lucian Predescu, Enciclopedia Cugetarea, București, 1940 (ediţia a II-a, 1999).
- Sever de Zotta, Paul Gore, Chişinău, 1928.
- Gheorghe Bezviconi, Pavel Gore în „D. T. N.”, III, 1936, nr. 28-30 din ianuarie-martie; V, 1937, nr. 50 din noiembrie.
- Constantin Moisil, Comisia consultativă heraldică, în „Revista Arhivelor”, I, 1925, nr. 2.

== See also ==
- Armorial of Romania
