= Kitsman urban hromada =

Urban hromada in Chernivtsi Oblast, Ukraine

Coordinates: 48°26′40″N 25°45′30″E

Kitsman urban hromada Кіцманська міська громада
- Hromada
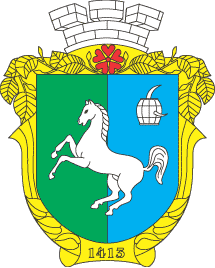
- Seal
- Interactive map of Kitsman urban hromada
- Country: Ukraine
- Oblast: Chernivtsi
- Raion: Chernivtsi

Area
  - Total: 96.3 km^{2} (37.2 sq mi)

Population (2018)
  - Total: 14,474
  - Density: 150/km^{2} (389/sq mi)
- Settlements: 11
- Cities: 1
- Villages: 10

Kitsman urban territorial hromada (Ukrainian: Кіцманська міська територіальна громада, romanized: Kitsmanska miska terytorialna hromada) is a hromada of Ukraine, located in the western Chernivtsi Oblast. Its administrative centre is the city of Kitsman.

== Settlements ==
In addition to one city (Kitsman), there are 10 villages within the hromada:

- Davydivtsi
- Havrylivtsi
- Ivankivtsi
- Klivodyn
- Lashkivka
- Oshykhliby
- Shypyntsi
- Sukhoverkhiv
- Valiava
- Vytylivka
