= Sever Zotta =

Romanian archivist, genealogist, historian (1874–1973)

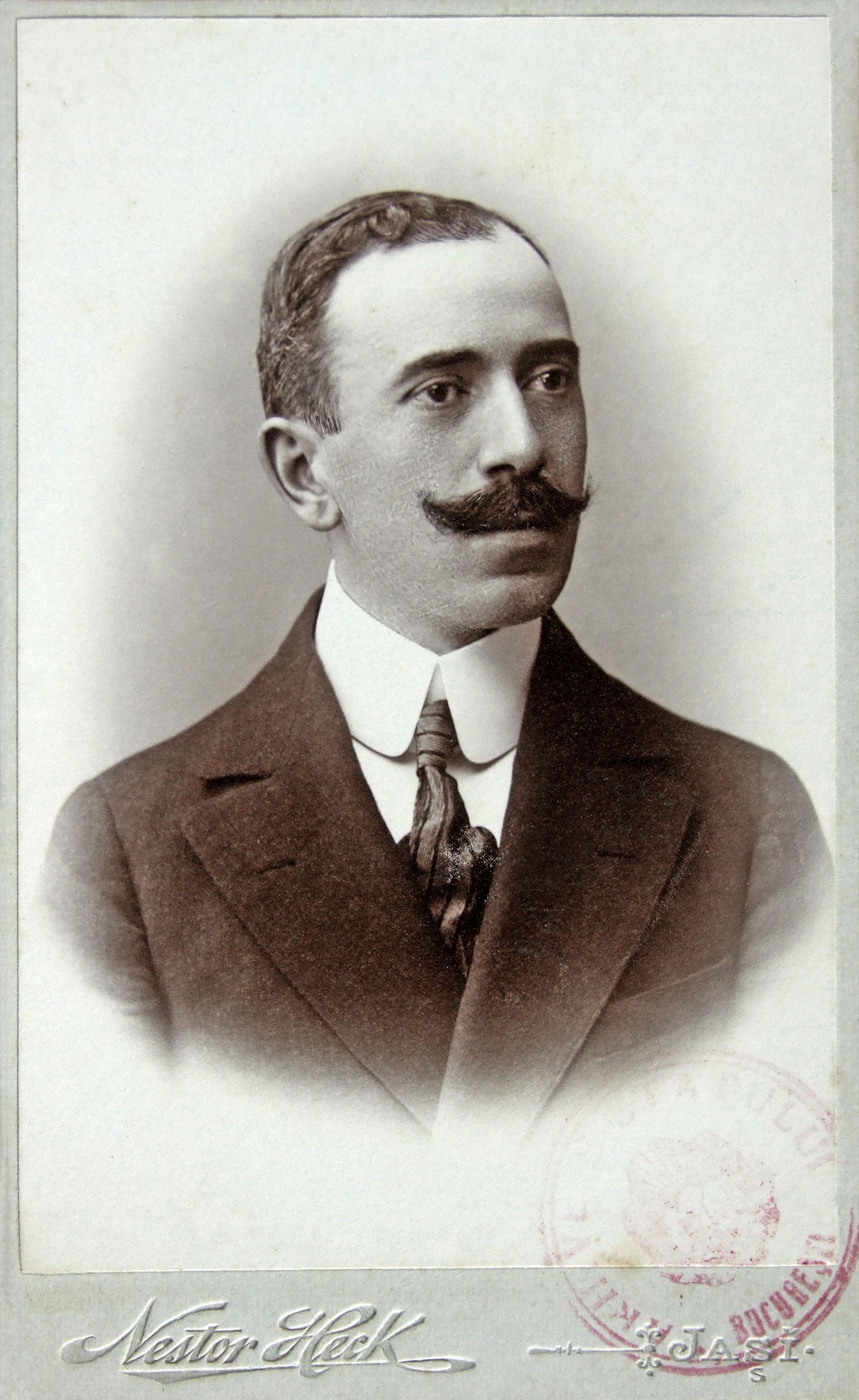
- Sever Zotta
- Born: 14 April 1874; Chisălău, Austria-Hungary (now Kyseliv, Kitsman raion, Chernivsti oblast, Ukraine)
- Died: 10 October 1943 (aged 69); Orsk, USSR
- Citizenship: Austrian Empire, Austria-Hungary, Kingdom of Romania
- Occupations: Archivist, genealogist, historian, publicist

Sever Ioan Zotta (Sever Ritter von Zotta) (April 14, 1874 – October 10, 1943) was a Romanian archivist, genealogist, historian and publicist, corresponding member of the Romanian Academy (since 1919).

The Zotta family has a history dating back to the 16th century in the Principality of Moldavia. Several members were ennobled as "Cavaliers of Zotta" in 1793. Sever Zotta, a descendant, was a well-known genealogist and historian in Romania. He studied law and social sciences, founded the Genealogical Archive magazine, and served as director of the State Archives in Iași from 1912 to 1934. He was also a correspondent member of the Romanian Academy and co-founded the Society of History and Archeology in Iași with historian Gheorghe Ghibănescu. Sever Zotta contributed to numerous historical publications and founded the first specialized genealogy publication, "Genealogical Archive." He was highly respected for his expertise in genealogical studies, but was arrested and deported by the Soviets in 1941.

== Origins and the family ==
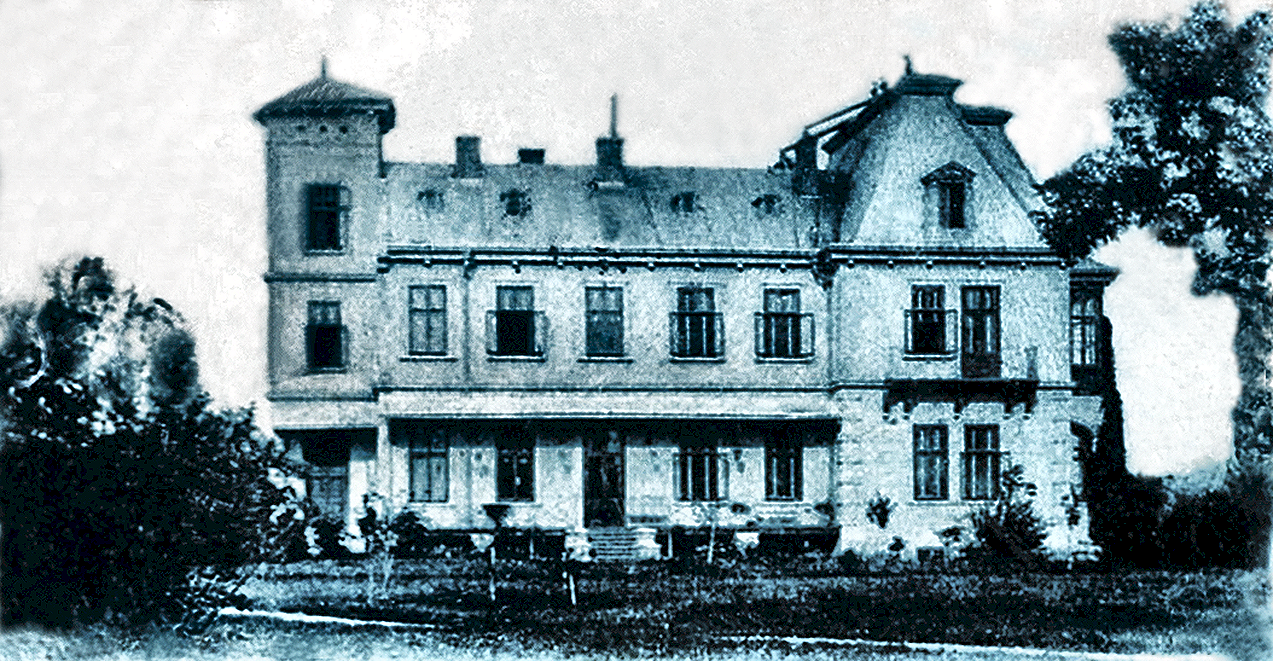
Villa of the Cavaliers of Zotta In the Novoselytsia in 1900

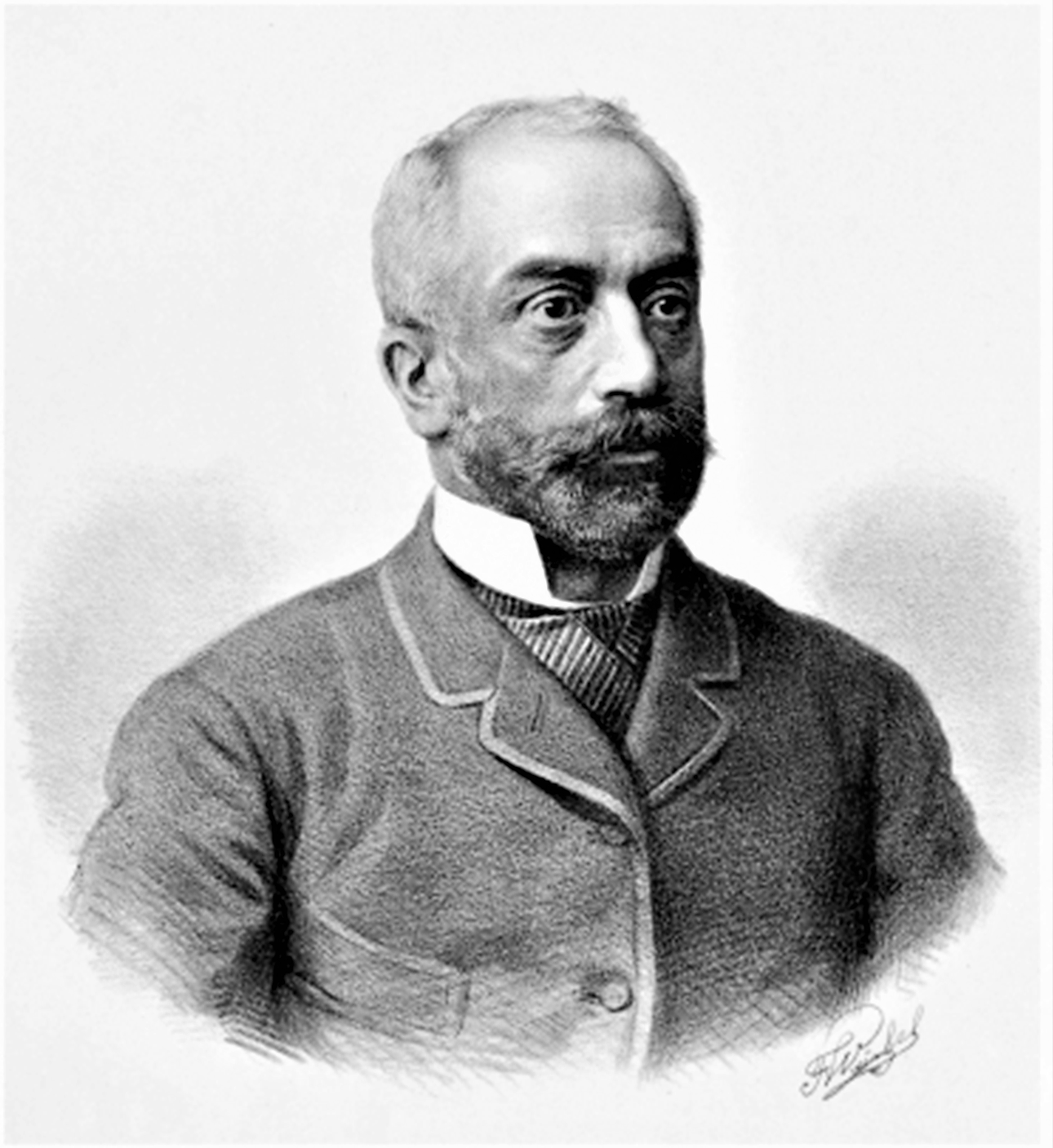
Iancu cavalier de Zotta (father) in 1890

The family name is known from before in the Principality of Moldavia. Thus, appears a Zota, deceived by Khotyn in a document of June 20, 1589. On August 4, 1645, a Zota from Chernivtsi has signed as a purchase contract for the great logothete and founder of the Coșula Monastery Gavrilaș Mateiaș.

The brothers Stephen, Ioan, Gregory, Gheorghe and Enache were ennobled under the title "Ritter von Zotta" (Cavaliers of Zotta) by Joseph II, Emperor of the Holy Roman Empire on January 21, 1793.

Sever was the second son of Ioan (Iancu) the cavalier of Zotta (b. October 10, 1840, Borauti - d. March 19, 1896, Novoselytsia), landowner, lawyer, member of the Dieta of Bucovina and of the Imperial Council of Vienna, and of his wife Elena (Ileana, Ilinca) (d. 1882), born Hurmuzachi. Ioan had two children, Octavian and Elena, married to the well-known politician Iancu Flondor. His father was also president of the political society Concordia, between 1891 and 1896, executive member of the country's culture society and of the Society for Romanian Culture and Literature in Bukovina.

Sever Zotta's wife was Margareta de Grigorcea (b. February 5, 1880 - d. June 28, 1969). The couple had among other children a son, Ioan (Iancu) (1909-1987) and a daughter Ruxandra (1910-2003). The latter married with André d'Albon.

== Education ==
First, young Sever graduated from secondary school in Chernivtsi, then he graduated from the higher studies (law and social sciences) at the University of Vienna. He took his law degree in Bucharest, in 1904, with the thesis: The lease agreement in Roman and Romanian law. In 1909, the historian published in Bucharest the historical piece in verses "Vasile Lupu". In 1911, he decided to remain in Iași where he devoted himself to genealogy studies. He founded the Genealogical Archive magazine that has appeared from January 1, 1912, which would be, as Zotta said, the alien to political struggles and far from any snobbish tendency of social differentiation. Unfortunately after 1913 it was no longer printed due to the lack of funds. The editorial staff of the Genealogical Archive magazine was at the Golia Monastery in Iași.

== Career ==
At the State Archive in Iași, whose rich deposits Zotta began to explore at his arrival in Iași, the vacancy of the head of the Archive had become vacant, because o the retirement of Gheorghe Ionescu-Gion in October 1912. Dimitrie Onciul, as General Director of the State Archives, has wished to give an impulse to the archival activity in Iași, and proposed to the higher forums Sever Zotta for this position. On October 1, 1912, he was appointed as director of the State Archives in Iași, a position he held until 1934. During this period he convinced the individuals to submit to the archives the documents they kept. In this way documents from his friend Pavel Gore (1875-1927) arrived in deposits. Also, the rich private archive, created by Nicolae Rosetti-Roznovanu, has arrived, for a certain time, to the Iași's archives. He was the successor of Ioan Tanoviceanu (law professor from Iași, specialized in the genealogy of the Prâjescu family from the Stolniceni village).

Since 1919, he became a correspondent member of the Romanian Academy and the honorary member of the "Historical Monuments Commission" (at the recommendation of Nicolae Iorga). In 1921, together with the historian Gheorghe Ghibănescu, they established the "Society of History and Archeology" in Iași. Zotta has carried out a rich publicity activity based primarily on the country's documentary treasury, gathered at the State Archives repositories. Thus, under the aegis of the Society of History and Archeology, in October 1921, the Ioan Neculce magazine appeared in Iasi, in which were published the studies and documents elaborated by him, Gheorghe Ghibănescu, Teodor Burada, Nicolai Andriescu-Bogdan and others. In all the editions of the Ioan Neculce journal that appeared between 1921 and 1933, Sever Zotta published studies and communications on Iasi's past, among which the interesting historical research on the Golia monastery were noted. In addition to Ioan Neculce magazine, Sever Zotta has collaborated with various historical publications: The Archive, The Historical Magazine, The Archive Magazine, The Literary Talks, The Romanian Archive, as well as in some newspapers (The event, Opinion, the Romanian People).

He founded the first specialized publication "Genealogical Archive" (published in Iași in 1912–1913). In the evolution of Romanian genealogical science, the appearance of the “Genealogical Archive” magazine was a remarkable event. The article-program "What do we want" is a true profession of faith: "The purpose of the present magazine is to awaken and enlarge the broad circles of the Romanian society, in and out of its political boundaries, the interest for the history, life and future of families because of this special interest to benefit the general interest for the history, life and future of the Romanian people". The entire archives with the Zotta works are in the Archives of Bucharest and Iasi (genealogy section). The Sever Zotta's personal fund, with inventory number 948 can be found in the National Archives of Romania in Bucharest. The correspondence collection carried by Sever Zotta with the personalities of that time, such as Nicolae Cartojan, Nicolae Docan, Gheorghe Bogdan-Duică, Constantin Giurescu, Pavel Gore, Nicolae Iorga, Dimitrie Onciul and Radu Rosetti can be found. Apart from these documents, studies and notes on the genealogy of some noble families and documents collected by Sever Zotta can be found. From the last series of documents is a fragment of the archive of Pavel Gore and of the Rosetti-Roznovanu family, letters from Costache Negri, A. Morariu.

Appreciated by D. Onciul and Nicolae Iorga for his outstanding scholarship in the field of genealogical studies, Sever Zotta entered into the Romanian historiography as a genealogist par excellence. He lived in Iași by 1934, when he retired. Surprised by the events of the summer of 1940 at his home in Davydivka (Storojineț County - today in Ukraine), Sever Zotta preferred to stay on site to save library and the manuscript collection.

On June 13, 1941, he was arrested by NKVD commissioners, who only gave him ten minutes to do his baggage, being deported by the Soviets to the Ural.

== The Sever Zotta Testimony ==
In the Bulletin of the Romanian Institute of Genealogy and Heraldry "Sever Zotta" no. IX, 7-9, Iași, 2007 Andrei Zotta, the Sever Zotta's son's nephew made the genealogist's testimony known. The document is dated of June 29, 1940, so it was written in the last hours before the closing of the new border ... and brought to the country by the Sever Zotta's son, the last left. The content of this testimony is as follows:

In the name of the Father, of the Son and of the Holy Spirit Amen.

In the case of my death I leave my beloved son as universal inheritor. I want my library and archive to remain separate and if my son does not have legitimate heirs to donate or sell them to a cultural institution. I also wish that, if he had the funds, to create a fund by which to award the annual prize for the best genealogy work of national preference.

This is my last will and testament. Davideni on June 29, 1940.

Sever Zotta.

== Death ==
He died in a Gulag prison in Orsk, in the south of the Urals, in October 1943.

== Awards and recognition ==
Sever Zotta was decorated with the Order of the Star of Romania in the rank of cavalier. The Sever Zotta Romanian Institute of Genealogy and Heraldry in Iași bears his name, honoring his contribution to the development of these branches of historical science in Romania. By his name was called "Sever Zotta Street" in Iași.

In the National Archives of Romania, the Iasi branch, there is a Sever Zotta Fund, with the extreme years 1502–1927.

D. Onciul and N. Iorga have shown appreciation for his outstanding work in the field of genealogical studies. He is well regarded in Romanian historiography as an important genealogist.

== Publications ==
Sever Zotta had a rich publishing activity in the field of historical research, in the such magazines such as The Archive, Ion Neculce, Literary Talks, The Event, The Romanian People, Opinion, The Archive Magazine, The Historical Magazine. Among his publications are the following:

- Vasile Lupu, historical piece in 3 acts, the lyrics, Bucharest, 1909;
- The principles of Romania descending from Movilești. in: Genealogical archive, Year II, July–September 1913;
- Spokesman of the Hăjdău family. In: Genealogical archive, Year II, July–September 1913;
- New data on Andronachi Donici, Iași, 1915;
- At the centenary of Vasile Alecsandri, 1821–1921, Iași, 1921;
- A missing monastery, Chișinău, 1924;
- Golia Monastery. Historical sketch, Iași, 1925;
- Paul Gore, Chișinău, 1928;
- About the people of Cantemirești, Iași,1931;
- A genealogical mystification: Ieremia Golia, Cluj, 1931;
- Die Abstammung der Familie Flondor, (transl. Genealogy of the Flondor Family), in Bukowiner Heimatblätter, JahrgangI, Heft 1–3, Rădăuți, 1933.
