= Kitsman =

City in Chernivtsi Oblast, Ukraine

Kitsman Кіцмань
- City
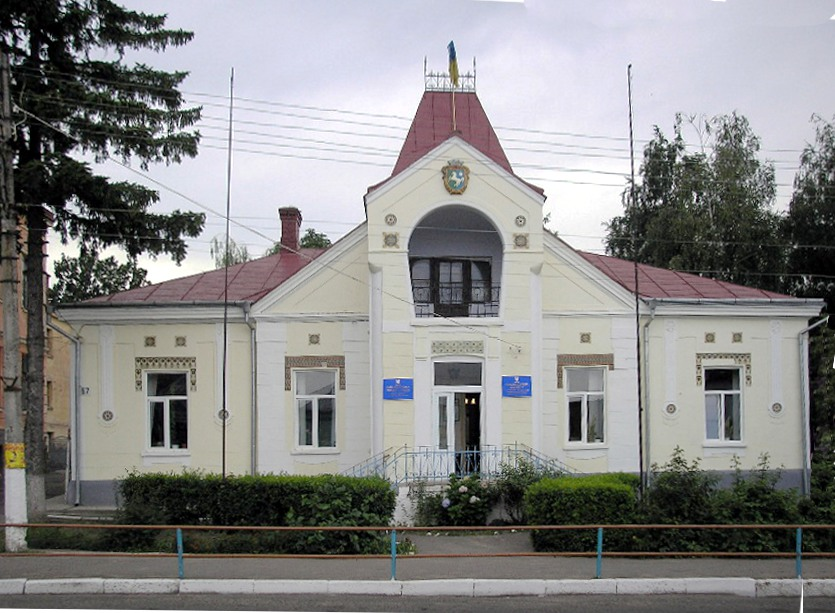
- City Hall

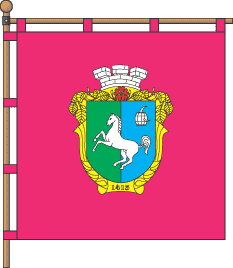
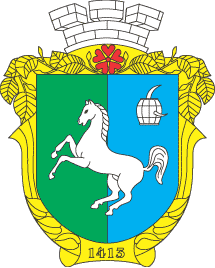
- Flag Coat of arms

- Location of Kitsman Kitsman (Ukraine)
- Coordinates: 48°26.5′N 25°45.6′E
- Country: Ukraine
- Oblast: Chernivtsi Oblast
- Raion: Chernivtsi Raion
- Hromada: Kitsman urban hromada
- First chronicled: 1413
- City rights: 1798

Government
  - City Head: Serhij Buleha
- Elevation: 232 m (761 ft)

Population (2022)
  - Total: 6,049
- Time zone: UTC+2 (EET)
  - Summer (DST): UTC+3 (EEST)
- Postal code: 59300-06

Kitsman (Ukrainian: Кіцмань [ˈkitsmɐnʲ]; Romanian: Coțmani, older Cozmeni or Chițmani; Yiddish: קאצמאן, romanized: Kotzman) is a city located in Chernivtsi Raion, Chernivtsi Oblast, in the historical region of Bukovina of western Ukraine. It hosts the administration of Kitsman urban hromada, one of the hromadas of Ukraine. The town is about 20 km (12 mi) northwest from Chernivtsi on the road to Zalishchyky. Population: 6,049 (2022 estimate). 5,963 (2023 estimate).

== Name ==
The original name — Cozmeni — is derived from the Romanian/Moldavian surname "Cozma" and had the meaning of "Cozma's kin settlement". Forming a village name from an existing name by adding the "-eni" suffix is widely spread in the Romanian speaking area. After the Habsburg annexation it was easier for the German speaking administration to use the "-mann" ending.

According other interpretations, the old surname Kitzman/Kotzman (and variations thereof) originated in Jewish culture, which had gradually become more common in parts of western Ukraine. The name was occupational and derivative of Hebrew roots; shortening the phrase kohen Tsedek ("priest of righteousness").

== History ==
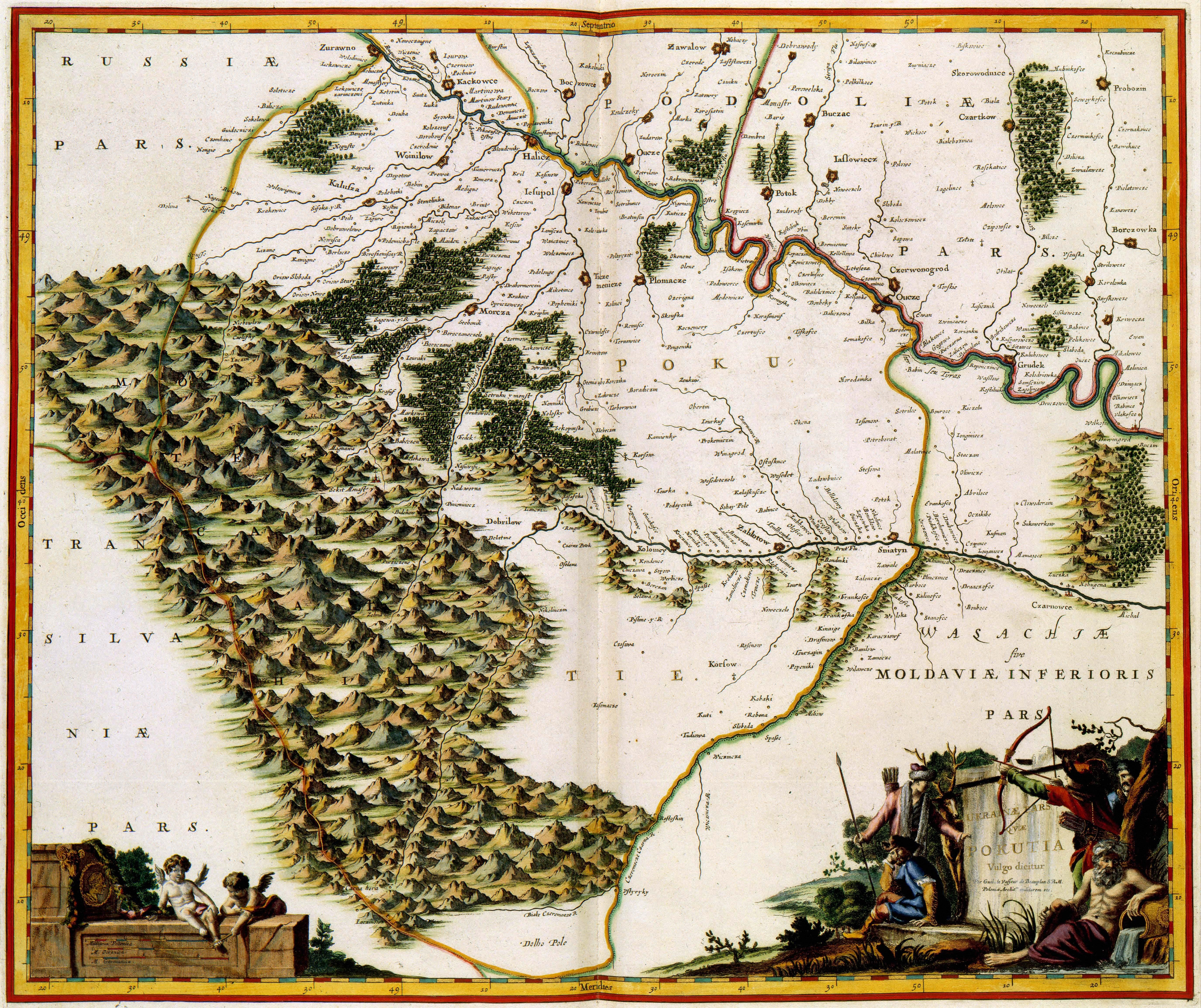
West of 'Czernowce' on the left bank of the Pruth is 'Kusman' (Beauplan map, 1639)

Historical affiliations

Moldavia 1413–1775
Habsburg monarchy 1775–1804
Austrian Empire 1804–1918
Kingdom of Romania 1918–1940
Soviet Union (Ukrainian SSR) 1940–1941
Kingdom of Romania 1941–1944
Soviet Union (Ukrainian SSR) 1944–1991
Ukraine 1991–present

The first historical mention of Kitsman is dated to 1413, which also appears on the city's crest. Kuzmyn Forest (Codrii Cozminului), woods are situated between Siret and Prut valleys next to the town are named so, because they are traversed by the roads that connect Suceava, the Middle Ages' capital of the Principality of Moldavia, with what was then its boundary town of Cozmin / Kozmyn (modern village Valia Kuzmyna in Chernivtsi Raion).

Just before the Habsburg annexation of this part of the Principality of Moldavia, both Romanian principalities (Moldavia and Wallachia) (at the time, Ottoman vassals) were invaded by Czarist Russia's army as a stage of a Russo-Turkish war. During the Russian occupation, Field-Marshal Count Pyotr Alexandrovich Rumyantsev ordered a census in these two principalities. According this census, the population in Cozmeni/Kitsman in 1774 comprised 105 Romanian families, one Jewish, and 15 "Russian". The term "Russians" covered Ruthenians/Ukrainians, Muscovite Russians, and Lipovans all together in the quoted census).

In the Austrian period (1774–1918), Kitsman (known as Kotzman/Kotzmann in German), as part of the Duchy of Bukovina, was the seat of the planning section of the district administration and it had a district court and a public school opened under the name of "Moldavische Trivialschule" (German for "Moldavian Elementary School"), where instruction was given in the Romanian language initially (1780s), then in German language (mid 19th century) and then Ruthenian (Ukrainian) language. From an ethnic perspective, the Austrian Empire supported Ruthenization – to keep the native Moldavians away from Moldavia (1774–1859) and away from Romania (after the Unification of Moldavia and Wallachia in 1859 to form modern Romania); while from a religious perspective, the Austrians promoted the Greek Catholic Church, to keep the population away from the other neighbor – Orthodox Russia. Between 1904 and 1918 a German-Ukrainian gymnasium and an agricultural school functioned in Kitsman.

The farmers from the 13 surrounding villages brought their produce to the market in Kitsman.

In November 1918, Kitsman was the residence of the Ukrainian government in Bukovina. After World War I, the union of Bukovina with Romania was declared. During the period of Romanian rule (1918–1944), the Romanian authorities viewed the Ukrainians (Ruthenes) as Ruthenized Romanians and attempted to reverse such a process by prioritizing schooling in Romanian. Despite this, Kitsman preserved the role of a major centre of Ukrainian culture in the region until 1940.

After the Molotov–Ribbentrop Pact of August 1939, the Soviet Union occupied Bessarabia and Northern Bukovina (including the Hertsa region) in June 1940. In June 1941, Romania entered World War II on the side of the Axis and re-established control over the region. The 1940 process was wrongly associated with the Jewish population; thus, Jews were seen by some as enemies of the state whose suppression was one of the goals of the state, while others, such as the mayor of Cernăuți, Traian Popovici, worked hard to save the Jews from deportation.

A local newspaper has been published here since June 1, 1941.

Until 18 July 2020, Kitsman served as an administrative center of Kitsman Raion. The raion was abolished in July 2020 as part of the administrative reform of Ukraine, which reduced the number of raions of Chernivtsi Oblast to three. The area of Kitsman Raion was split between Chernivtsi Raion and Vyzhnytsia Raion, with Kitsman being transferred to Chernivtsi Raion.

== Population ==
Historical population
Year	Pop.	±%
1930	5,000	—
1989	9,500	+90.0%
2013	6,762	−28.8%
2022	6,049	−10.5%
2023	5,963	−1.4%

In 1930 Kitsman had around 5,000 inhabitants. In January 1989 the population was 9,500 people, while in January 2013 the population was 6,762 people.

=== Jewish community ===
Out of the population of 6,000 that Kitsman had, approximately 700 (11.6%) were Jews who had emigrated from nearby areas of Galicia at the beginning of the 19th century and who dealt mainly with commerce in agricultural products. They also were occupied as craftsmen and were practically the only representatives of the intellectual professions. There were Jews in the ranks of the judges and in the bureaucracy. To name a few, Nathan Seidmann, a clerk in the planning section of the district administration in Kitsman who in his time as a member of the executive committee 2 during the years 1921 to 1927 and intermittently as chairman of the Zionist organization, performed notable service. Before 1914, the Jews and the Ruthenian (Ukrainian) population of the town and the surrounding villages co-existed in peace.

== Notable people ==
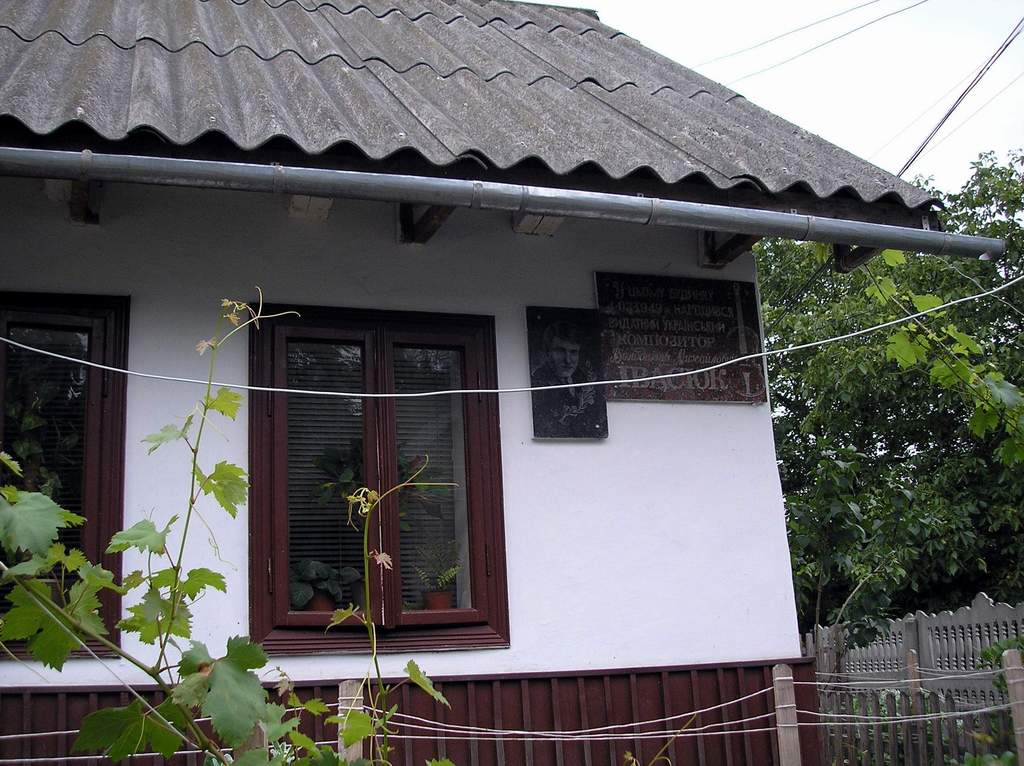
Volodomyr Ivasyuk's birthplace

- Volodymyr Ivasyuk (1949–1979), Ukrainian songwriter, composer, and poet
- Ani Lorak (born 1978), Ukrainian singer, songwriter, actress, and entrepreneur
- Ioan Țurcan (1818–1902), ethnic Romanian Orthodox priest and politician in Austria-Hungary, in the Duchy of Bukovina
- Iancu Zotta (1840–1896), ethnic Romanian politician in Bukovina, within Austria-Hungary
