= Alexander Kozulin (pianist) =

German pianist and showman

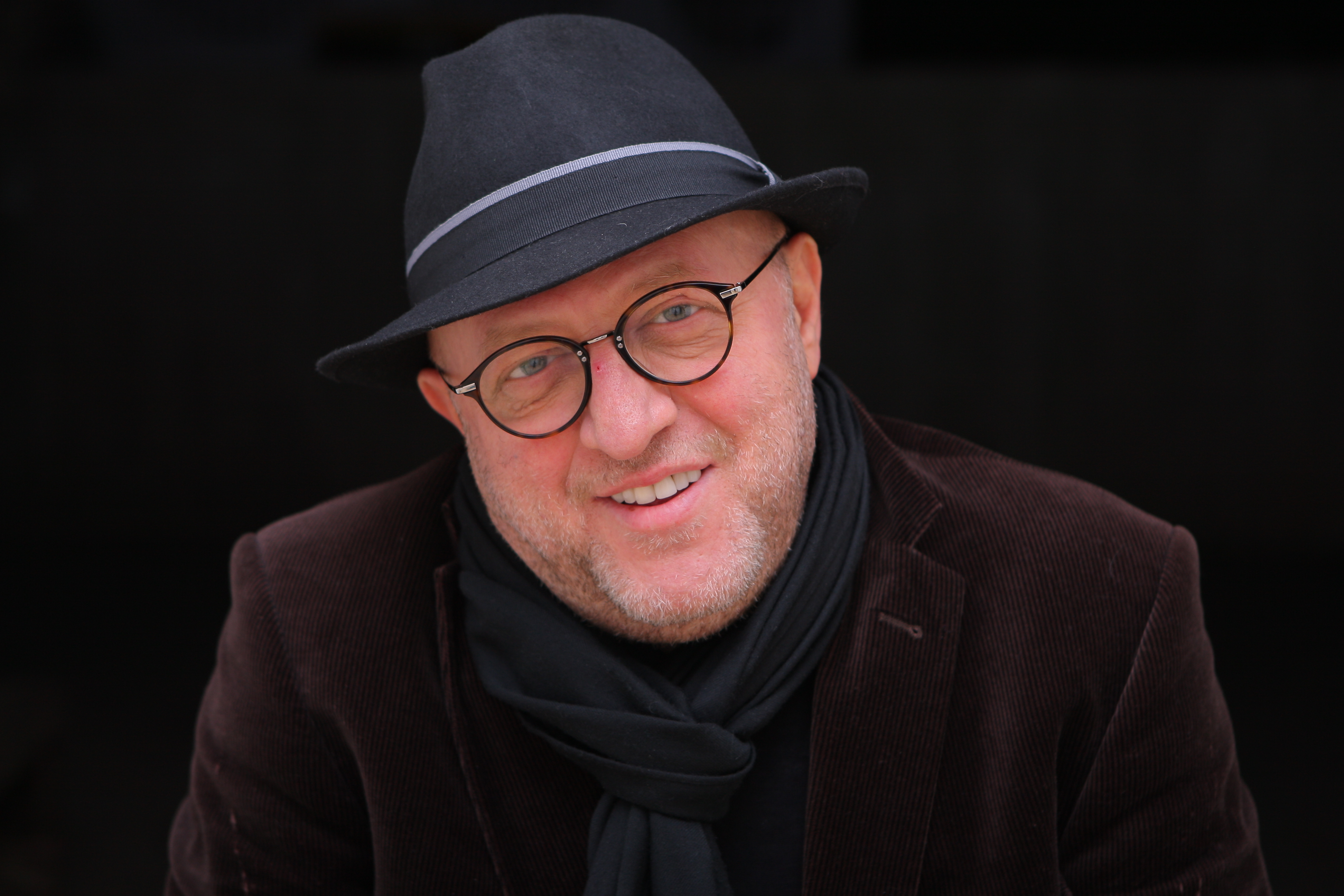
- Portrait Alexander Kozulin made in Israel
- Born: Alexander Mikhailovich Kozulin; November 24, 1958 (age 67)
- Occupation: pianist
- Musical career

Alexander Mikhailovich Kozulin (born Dulfan) (Russian: Алекса́ндр Козу́лин (Дульфан)) born on 24 November 1958 in Novoselytsia, Ukraine, USSR of Jewish parentage. Kozulin is actively involved in social work and charity. His showmanship, business and creative work have received worldwide recognition specifically in Europe, Russia and the USA. He is fluent in five languages.

== Biography ==
1965–1973, Kozulin was educated in Novoselytsa, Ukraine where he also focused on theatre, ballet and music, becoming accomplished on piano, guitar, trumpet and drums, as well as vocals.
In 1973, Alex immigrated to Israel with his family.
1973–1975, Alex continued his studies in music, and created his first rock group STAR, performing at Israeli concerts and festivals.
In 1975, Alex started his show-business career, as a piano player in Café Ron, in Haifa, followed by being the nightclub piano-entertainer in Donna Grazia, Tiberias and subsequently at "Kostik Bar" in the Shalom Hotel Ramada, Jerusalem.
In 1978, he married his wife Carmella and moved in 1979 to Munich, Germany where he performed in "Club 28", and subsequently in the Berlin Club "New York – New York".
1980 – 1982, He was the piano-entertainer in Hotel Kempinski, before opening his own Berlin club: "Club Kammerton".
In 1983, He opened his first celebrity club "Chez Alex Piano Bar", that was recognised as World's No. 1 in its genre. (Newsweek International poll 1984)
in 1984, He released his first LP record "Chez Alex Piano Bar" and a single record with the song "Scheen muss sie sein…", and in his third record he recorded "Schöne Frauen kosten Geld."
Through his musical showmanship, Alex became world renowned, performing in his own club, on Radio and Television as well as at Political and High Society events for the President and Chancellor of Germany and at festivals.
In 1986, his second club "Alex Berlin" opened, and subsequently his third club in New York, "The Supper Club" in 1990.
1994 - 1999, Alexander Kozulin was hired by the Rafael's Flagship Resort "Turnberry Isle" at Aventura, Florida as an Art Director and Music Entertainer, whilst his 4th Club "Chez Alex Piano Bar" opened in Fort Lauderdale, Florida.
In 2000, Alexander returned to Berlin, where he established the Talent Booking Agency "Chez Alex Entertainment" conceiving and produced a charity ball called "Zarenball" (Tzar's Ball) to help gifted children from impoverished families in Russia.
2001 - 2004, Tzar's ball was held in Germany annually, and he was subsequently bestowed by the Russian Royal Association with the honorary life-title: "Baron de Russ", for his contribution to Charity.
In 2004, Alex opened "Alex Events Ltd", in Russia as well as "First Line Travel" and continued to produce galas and high-end events for leading personalities in the establishment, business world, sports, music and film industry.
Alex Kozulin has actively contributed to projects worldwide, including supporting the development of Pleasure Island in Dubai, the Diaghilev Triumph, one of the world's largest sports and cultural entertainment centres.

== Family ==
His grandfather, Semyon Sheyn was a Men's wear Designer. He, among another 36 Jewish communists, was shot in the beginning of WWII, for his ideological adherence to the Communist Party.
His grandmother, Sofia Kizhner was fluent in many languages. She also played multiple musical instruments, despite having only the primary school education. After the war, when Sofia Kizhner returned home from the concentration camp, her assets were expropriated and she was allocated only a tiny room in the large house that once belonged to her, where she was forced to dwell with all of her family. She was responsible for Alexander's upbringing in the early years of his life and paid undivided attention to his education and manners.
Alexander's father, Mikhail Borisovich Dulfan was an Art dealer, dealing in 20th Century Art. He was continually traveling and never dedicated time and attention to his son and wife, before leaving the family when Alex was 5 years old.
Alexander's mother, Bella Semyonovna was forced to leave university where she studied law and worked in a hairdressing salon to make ends meet. Subsequently, she married a second time to Arkadiy Kozulin, who adopted Alexander giving him his Surname.
Alexander's brother, Micha Kozulin (born 1968) lives in Israel with his wife and four children.
First Marriage: In 1978 Alexander married Carmella and they have two daughters, Sarah-Shiri (born 1982) and Emmi-Marina (Born 1988). In 2001 they divorced.
Second Marriage: In 2008 Kozulin married his second wife and business partner Liana Kozulina (Weissmann) and they currently reside in Berlin with their son Giora Alexander [born 2011].

In 2018 Kozulin's family moved to Moscow for permanent living. In 2019 they divorced.

== Creative work ==
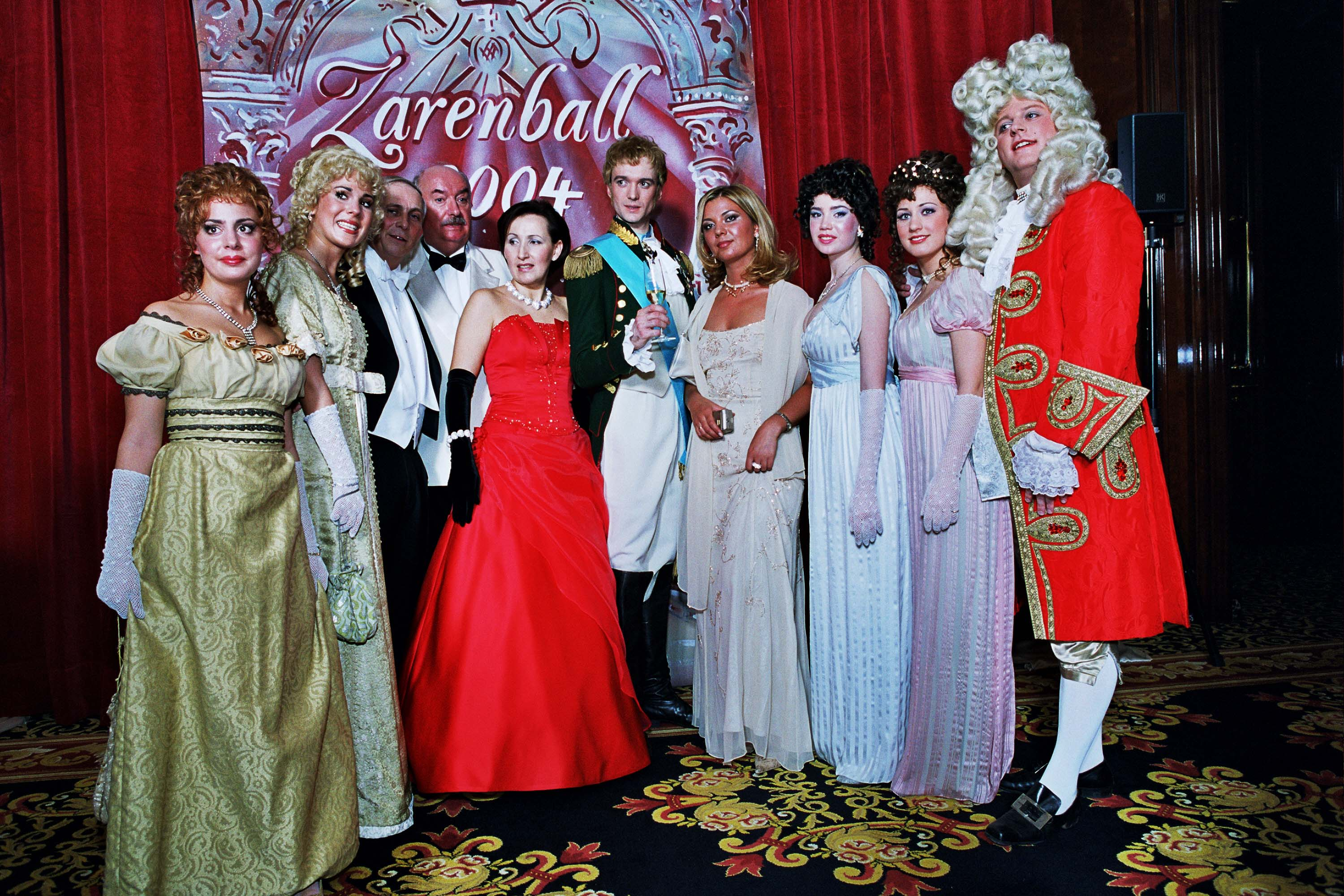
Zarenball Irina & Alexander von Bismark

In 1992, Alexander Kozulin is included in the Who Is Who book in Germany (1992, Volume 2).

Among his major achievements, the following can be highlighted:
Music Singles

- "Geld ist nicht wichtig, aber schön muss sie sein …," 1984
- "Schöne Frauen kosten Geld …," 1985
- "Ursula oh-la-la …," 1985

Music Albums and CDs

- "Chez Alex Piano Bar," 1984
- "Mix on the street," 1992
- "Unpublished," 1994

As a producer

- The CD "Ancient Echoes" became # 11 on the Billboard music chart in the US in 1994. (Choir Academy under the conduction of Alexander Sedov.)
- Charity action Tzar's Ball helping highly gifted children from impoverished families in Russia. Alexander acts as a producer, concept creator, director, strategist and organizer.
- Alexander is one of the creators of the Gauklerfest in Germany, a festival of street art in Berlin, which is still taking place annually. The first festival was held in 1984.
- Stars for Kids / A merry Christmas

== Business ==
In 1983, After his first bar Kammerton, in Berlin, he opened, "Chez Alex Piano Bar" which was rated in a Newsweek International poll in 1984, the most popular piano bar of its class worldwide.
In 1986, Alex Kozulin opened the renowned celebrity club "Alex Berlin", and in 1991, together with Martin Thesing (GER) and Jean Denoyer (NY), he opened "The Supper Club" in New York.
In 1996, a new "Chez Alex Piano Bar" opened in Fort Lauderdale, Florida.
Alex's presence and personality attracted representatives of the business, politics, nobility, culture and science elite and many distinguished and eminent personalities including the Helmut Kohl family, Prince of Monaco, Gilles Hennessy, Ephraim Kishon, Sylvester Stallone, Claude Brasseur, Jean Paul Belmondo, Udo Jürgens, Frank Sinatra, Dean Martin, Michael Jackson, Lino Ventura, The Rolling Stones, Ella Fitzgerald and Stevie Wonder, Benny Goodman, Prince, Joe Cocker, Bill Clinton and many others, happily sang alongside to Alex's piano accompaniment.
In 2000, Kozulin returned to Berlin to start a new era in his business projects, opening the respected Booking Agency "Chez Alex Entertainment".
The first of a string of Charity events for impoverished Russian aspiring child musicians the "Tzar's Ball" was born.
In 2004, "Chez Alex Event Concept" was developed out of Chez Alex Entertainment, providing stars and event management services, as well as First Line travel providing luxury travel and life style service facilities to its clients which include the Alfa Group (RU), Renova Group (RU), Access Industries, PrivatBank (UA), Volkswagen, and others.
Since 2013, in addition to his activity in the Event and Lifestyle Business, his interest in the Arts developed, as he began to take an interest in providing selected art to his key clientele, but also helping gifted contemporary Artists in developing their careers and finding new markets.
Kozulin has established relations with eminent collectors and gallery owners, Museum curators, Experts, art restorers and dealers on a worldwide basis, and whilst he focuses largely on Impressionism & Modern as well as Contemporary art, his love of the arts is well recognized amongst the select clientele and artists that he co-operates with.

Alex Kozulin is the owner and CEO of the DeRuss Group in Berlin, which includes DeRuss Events (Berlin), First Line Travel GmbH (Berlin), Alex Events Ltd (Moscow) and a new Gallery–Art Exchange (Berlin, Germany)
Alex is completing his first book about making successful exclusive events "The Anatomy of Celebration" as well as working on opening a new "Chez Alex Bistro-Bar & Art Gallery" in Berlin.
