= Novoselytsia =

City in Chernivtsi Oblast, Ukraine

Novoselytsia Новоселиця Noua Suliță
- City
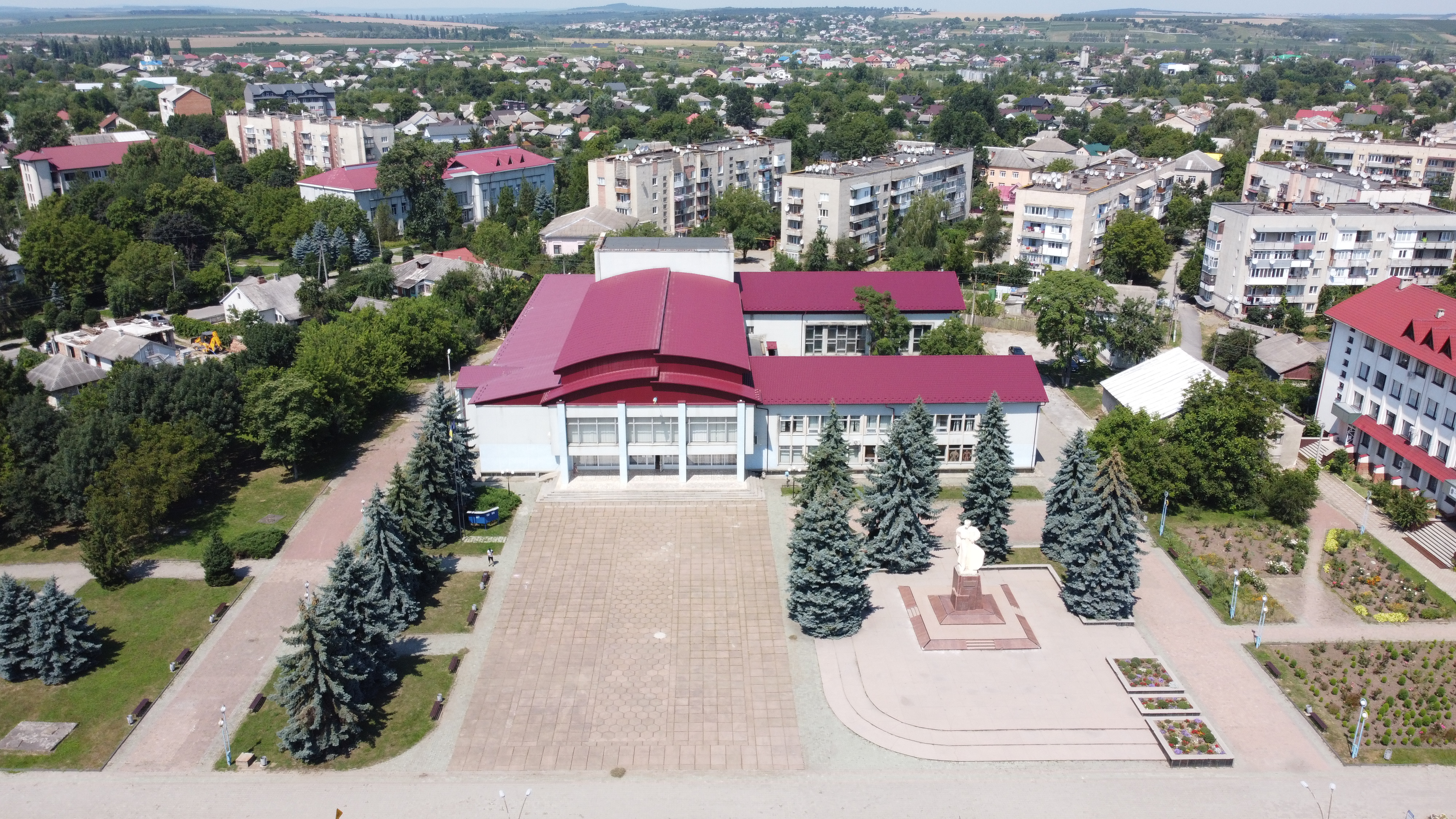
- Central square of Novoselytsia

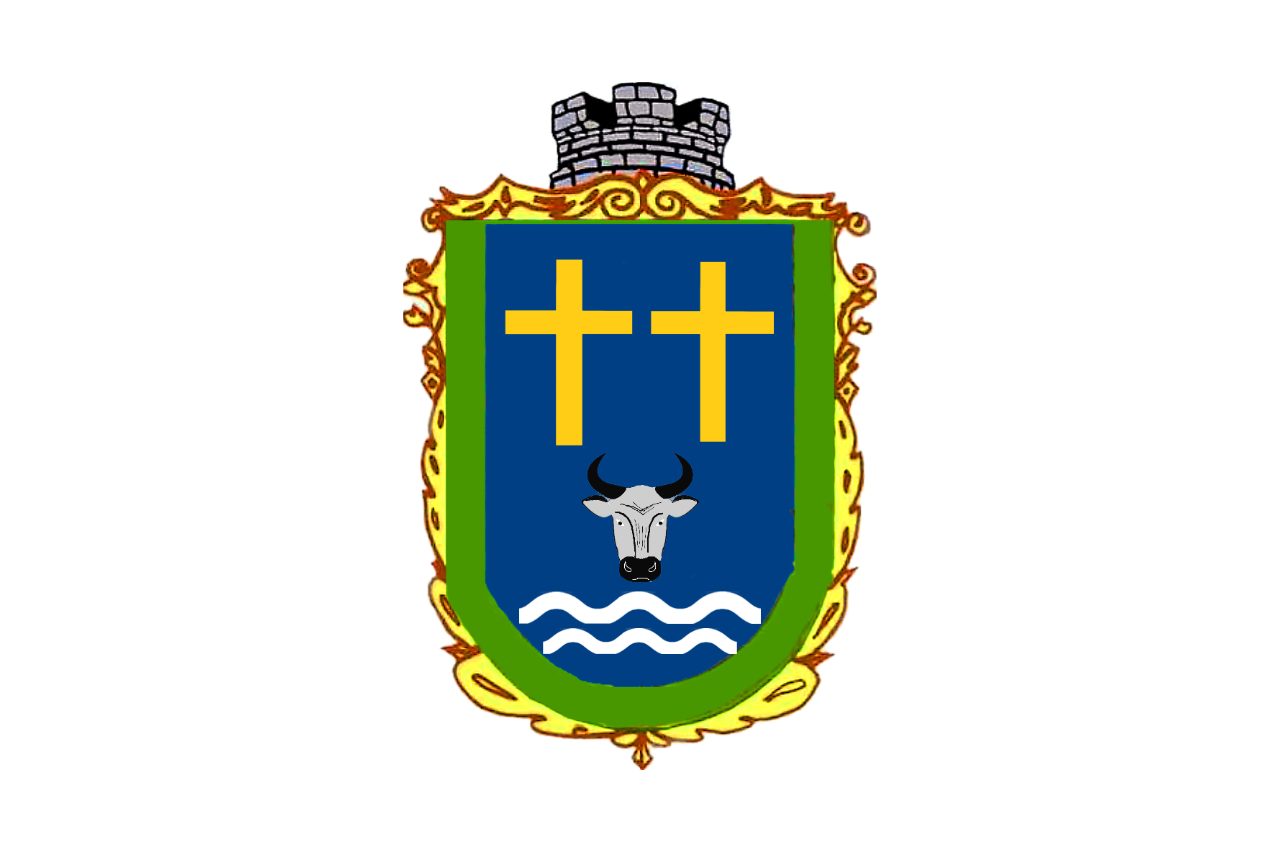
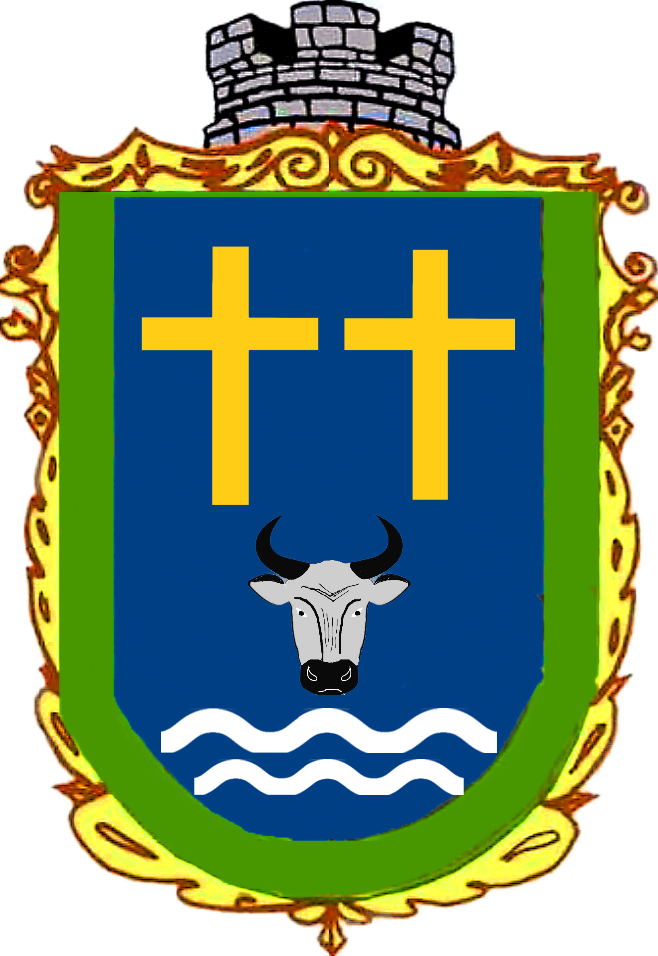
- Flag Coat of arms
- Interactive map of Novoselytsia
- Location in Ukraine Novoselytsia (Ukraine)
- Coordinates: 48°13′N 26°16′E
- Country: Ukraine
- Oblast: Chernivtsi Oblast
- Raion: Chernivtsi Raion
- Hromada: Novoselytsia urban hromada
- First mentioned: 1456
- City status: 1940

Area
  - Total: 250 sq mi (647 km^{2})

Population (2022)
  - Total: 7,399
- Time zone: UTC+2 (EET)
  - Summer (DST): UTC+3 (EEST)
- Post code: 60300-06
- Area code: +380-3733
- Website: novmeria.gov.ua

Novoselytsia (Ukrainian: Новоселиця, IPA: [ˌnɔwoˈsɛlɪtsʲɐ]; Romanian: Noua Suliță, IPA: [ˈnowa ˈsulitsə]; Yiddish: נאוואסעליץ, romanized: Novoselitz; German: Nowoselitza) is a city in Chernivtsi Raion, Chernivtsi Oblast (province) of Ukraine. It stands at the northern tip of Bessarabia region, on its border with Bukovina. It hosts the administration of Novoselytsia urban hromada, one of the hromadas of Ukraine. Population: 7,399 (2022 estimate).

== History ==
From 1775 to 1918, Bukovina was an administrative division of the Habsburg monarchy, and a province of Austria-Hungary (Austrian half). After World War I, Bucovina became part of Romania. In 1940, the northern half of Bucovina was annexed by the Soviet Union.

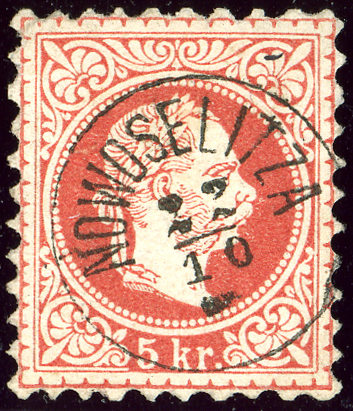
Austrian stamp cancelled around 1874 in the Bukovina province

From 1774 to 1877, Novoselytsia was at the tripoint between the Austrian Empire (Duchy of Bukovina), the Ottoman Empire (Principality of Moldavia, later Romania), and the Russian Empire (Bessarabia Governorate). The larger part of the settlement belonged to the Russian Empire and the smaller to the Austro-Hungarian Monarchy. After the secondary customs office in Boiany was closed in 1866, Novoselytsia was the only border point between Russian Bessarabia and Austrian Bukovina. With the inauguration of the train connection between the Russian and the Austrian province in 1893, Novoselytsia was also the fourth train junction between the two Empires.

Until 18 July 2020, Novoselytsia served as an administrative center of Novoselytsia Raion. The raion was abolished in July 2020 as part of the administrative reform of Ukraine, which reduced the number of raions of Chernivtsi Oblast to three. The area of Novoselytsia Raion was split between Chernivtsi and Dniester Raions, with Novoselytsia being transferred to Chernivtsi Raion.

Until at least 2020, in the town, there was a raion Romanian-language newspaper, Cuvantul Adevarului.

== Population ==
The distribution of the population by native language in 2001 was Ukrainian 54.9%, Romanian 34.5% (including 33.2% who called the language "Moldovan" and 1.3% who called it Romanian), and Russian 10.1%. In 2001, the population mostly identified itself as 54.37% ethnically Ukrainian, 35.82% as Moldovan, 1.63% as Romanian, and 6.84% as Russian. Among the urban localities of Ukraine, this city had the largest share of self-identified Moldovans. Unlike in the cities of Ukrainian southern Bessarabia except for Tatarbunary, where most Moldovans spoke Russian as their native language, most of the self-identified ethnic Moldovans and Romanians of Novoselytsia were Romanian-speaking in 2001. In 1989, the town had a mostly ethnically Ukrainian population which also included those with a Moldovan ethnic identity, who were 39.01% of the population, while those with a Romanian ethnic identity formed 1.53% of the population. Thus, the proportion of the population with a Moldovan ethnic identity decreased and that with a Romanian ethnic identity increased from 1989 to 2001. Novoselytsia is the city in Ukraine with the largest proportion of the population with a Moldovan ethnic identity in the country; there is no city with an absolute Moldovan ethnic majority in Ukraine. It is also the city with the second largest Romanian-language percentage of the population, after Hertsa, and the city with the largest proportion of the population calling its language Moldovan. In 2001, in the Novoselytska urban community, out of 32,104 inhabitants, 17,697 were Romanian-speaking (55.12%), out of which 51.59% called their language "Moldovan" and 3.53% called it Romanian, while 41.55% were Ukrainian-speaking and 3.16% were Russian-speaking.

In January 1989 the population was 8,384 people.

In January 2013 the population was 7,774 people.

== Notable people ==
- Volf Bergraser, French chess master
- Nicolae Bosie-Codreanu, politician of the Moldavian Democratic Republic
- Ieremia Cecan, Romanian priest and far-right politician
- Tetyana Filonyuk, Ukrainian athlete
- Benjamin Charles Gruenberg, American biology educator and writer
- Abba P. Lerner, American economist
- Alexander Kozulin, German showman and pianist
- Iancu Zotta (1840-1896), politician, headed the Society for Romanian Culture and Literature in Bukovina

== Gallery ==
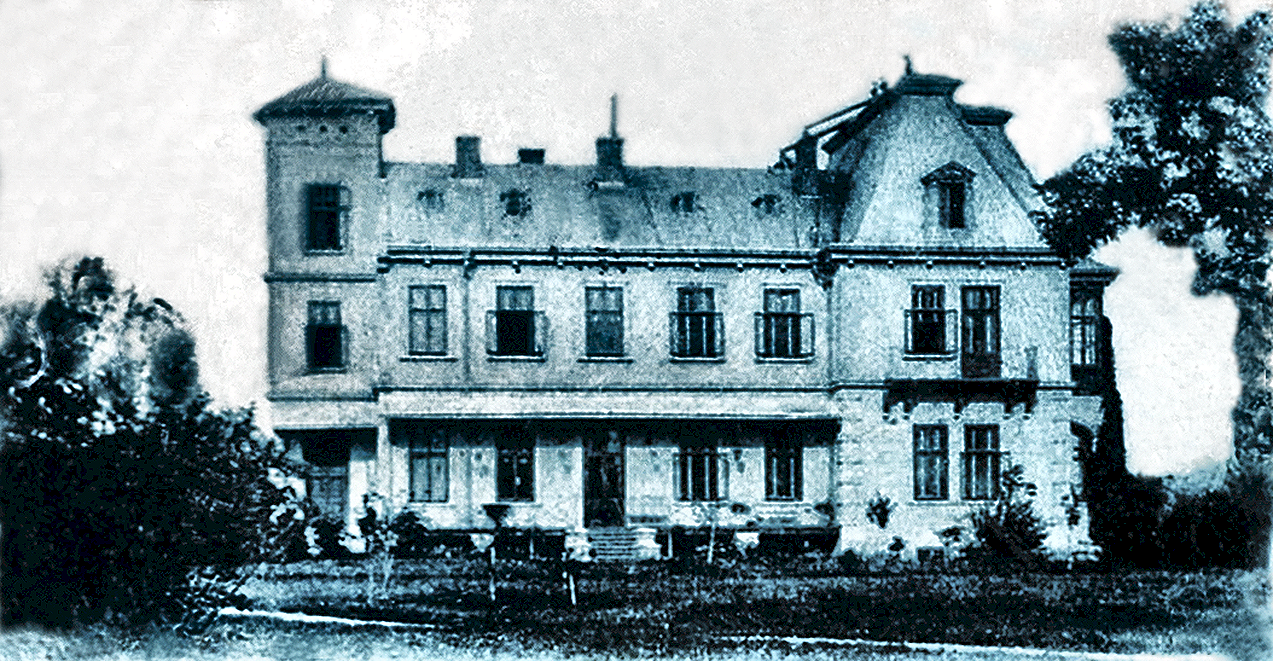
Villa der Ritter von Zotta in Novoselytsia, 1900
