= Coșula Monastery =

Heritage site in Botoşani County, Romania

Coordinates: 47°37′20.1″N 26°46′29.7″E

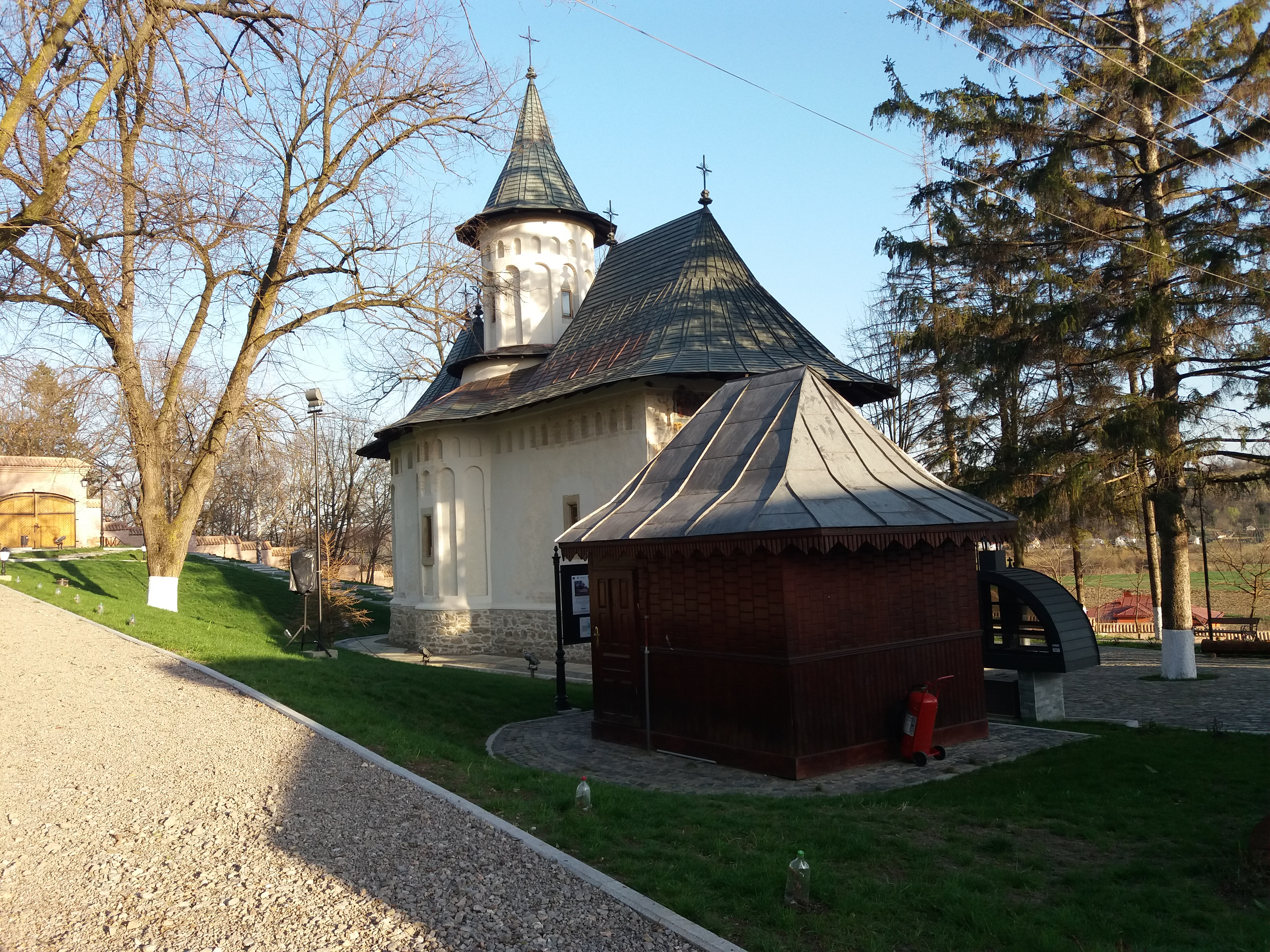
- Coșula Monastery

- Location within Romania

Monastery information
- Established: 1535

People
- Important associated figures: Mateiaş

Site
- Location: Coşula, Botoșani County, Romania
- Visible remains: church, inner court and earthworks
- Public access: yes

Coșula Monastery is a monastery of monks located in the village of Coșula (in Botoșani County), at a distance of 20 kilometers southeast of Botoșani city. This is reached by walking 3 km on a county road on the right DN 28 B. Coșula Monastery dates from the year 1535, when the great treasurer Mateiaș built a monastic complex here. The Coșula monastery was the only one in Botosani county that also had the painted exterior. It is also known for its 500-year-old fresco and the legendary Yellow Coșula. On the fresco are represented the scene of Pentecost and the "Savior's Cross".

It is listed as a historic monument by Romania's Ministry of Culture and National Identity.
