= Shypyntsi =

Village in Chernivtsi Oblast, Ukraine

Shypyntsi Шипинці
- Location of Shypyntsi Shypyntsi (Chernivtsi Oblast)
- Coordinates: 48°22′36″N 25°45′01″E
- Country Oblast Raion: Ukraine; Chernivtsi Oblast; Chernivtsi Raion
- Elevation: 180 m (590 ft)

Population (2014)
  - Total: 3,067
- Time zone: UTC+2 (EET)
  - Summer (DST): UTC+3 (EEST)
- Postal code: 59341
- Area code: +380 3736
- ISO 3166 code: UA-26

Shypyntsi (Ukrainian: Шипинці; Romanian: Șipeniț; German: Schipenitz), a village in Ukraine, is located within Chernivtsi Raion (district) of Chernivtsi Oblast (province), about 530 kilometers (330 mi) driving distance southwest of Kyiv, and about 30 kilometers (19 mi) northwest from the provincial capital of Chernivtsi. Shypyntsi is about 48 kilometers (30 mi) from the Ukrainian/Romanian border, about 64 kilometers (40 mi) from the Ukrainian/Moldovan border, and about 80 kilometers (50 mi) from the city of Suceava, Romania.

Boxing champion Oleksander Usyk is from this village, which is located on the left bank of the Prut River, amid rolling hills covered with farms and forests, in the region generally known as the Dniester Hills. It belongs to Kitsman urban hromada, one of the hromadas of Ukraine.

Until 18 July 2020, Shypyntsi belonged to Kitsman Raion. The raion was abolished in July 2020 as part of the administrative reform of Ukraine, which reduced the number of raions of Chernivtsi Oblast to three. The area of Kitsman Raion was split between Chernivtsi Raion and Vyzhnytsia Raion, with Shypyntsi being transferred to Chernivtsi Raion.

To the north of the village are the ancient ruins of a Cucuteni-Trypillian culture settlement, dating back to the 5th Millennium to early 4th Millennium BC. Archaeological excavation began at this site in the late 19th century by a team of Ukrainians: J. Shombathy, R. Kindle, F. Volkov, O. Kandyba and Tatiana Sergeyevna Passek. Houses, earthenware, and ceramic shards were discovered, and in 1938 Kandyba published a collection of images from this site of beautifully decorated pottery.

This settlement was part of the Neolithic Cucuteni-Trypillian culture, which lasted from 5100 to 2750 BC, and which had some of the largest communities in the world at the time. The members of this society plowed their farms, raised livestock, hunted and fished, created textiles, and developed a beautiful and highly refined style of pottery with very intricate designs. Their settlements were built in oval or circular layouts, with concentric rows of houses interconnected to form rings around the center of the community, where often a sanctuary building would be found. They left behind a large number of clay figurines, many of which are regarded as Goddess fetishes. For over 2500 years their culture flourished with no evidence left behind that would indicate they experienced warfare. However, at the beginning of the Bronze Age their culture disappeared, the reasons for which are still debated, but possibly as a result of invaders coming from the Steppes to the east.

The artifacts taken from the Shypyntsi ruins are kept in museums in Chernivtsi and Vienna.

== See also ==
- Neolithic Europe
- Chalcolithic Europe
- Prehistory of Southeastern Europe
- History of Ukraine
