= Găujani (disambiguation) =

Găujani may refer to the following places in Romania:

- Găujani, a commune in Giurgiu County
- Găujani, a village in the commune Ungheni, Argeș County
- Găujani, a village in the commune Boișoara, Vâlcea County
- Găujani (river), a river in Vâlcea County
