= Petre Pandrea =

Romanian writer, lawyer and activist (1904–1968)

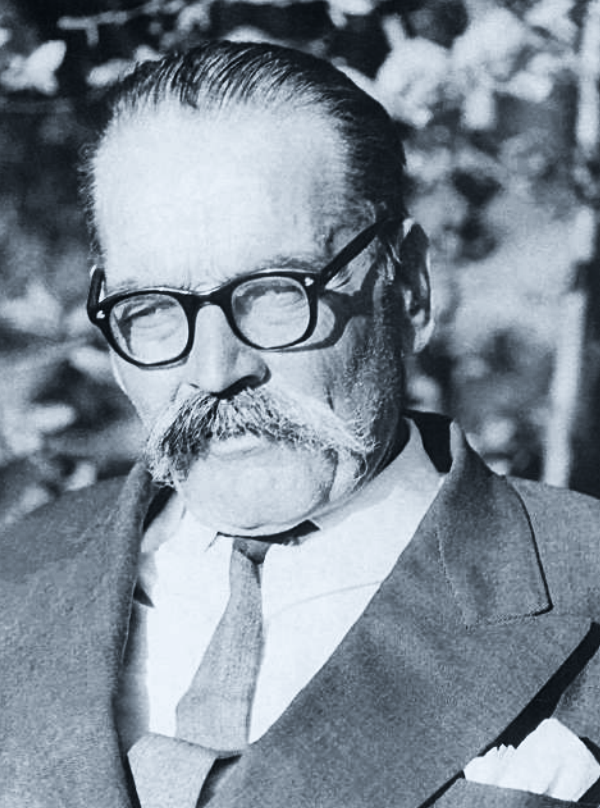
- Pandrea c. 1967
- Born: Petre Ion Marcu; 26 June 1904; Balș, Romanați County, Kingdom of Romania
- Died: 8 July 1968 (aged 64); Bucharest, Socialist Republic of Romania
- Occupations: Lawyer, legal scholar, sociologist, journalist, critic, diplomat
- Writing career
- Period: 1923–1968
- Genres: Essay; reportage; diary; memoir; aphorism; social novel; autobiographical novel; historical novel
- Movements: Gândirea; Trăirism; Viața Romînească; Neohegelianism; Marxist literary criticism; Psychoanalytic literary criticism

Petre Pandrea, pen name of Petre Ion Marcu, also known as Petru Marcu Balș (26 June 1904 – 8 July 1968), was a Romanian social philosopher, lawyer, and political activist, also noted as an essayist, journalist, and memoirist. A native of rural Oltenia, he was always a promoter of its regional identity, which blended into peasant populism. Other than these two traits, and his iconoclastic irreverence that bordered on anarchism, his political opinions fluctuated several times between extremes—from right-wing conservatism to Marxism-Leninism. Beginning from the 1910s, when Pandrea was training as a cadet at Dealu Monastery, he was intimately acquainted with the power structures and ideologies of the Romanian Kingdom; it was also here that he first met the anti-liberal ideologue Nae Ionescu, who became the object of his fascination, and, for a while, an intellectual mentor. Eventually dropping out of the Romanian Land Forces, he was an award-winning student at Carol I National College in Craiova, making his debut almost simultaneously in two rival national magazines: Gândirea and Viața Romînească.

Pandrea riled up the cultural establishment of Greater Romania in 1928, when, with Ion Nestor and Sorin Pavel, he produced the "White Lily" manifesto. This text formulated his desire to reconnect modern literature with Christian mysticism, and also credited unmitigated experiences as a legitimate source of inspiration—a philosophical credo that was later known as Trăirism. Pandrea had by then embarked on a prestigious career as a legal scholar and sociologist, which allowed him to travel in Europe; during his time in Weimar Germany, he studied Neohegelianism, embraced atheism and dialectical materialism, and explored psychoanalysis. He also returned as a committed anti-fascist, having been troubled by the Nazis' rise to power—described in his best-selling book of essays on "Hitlerian Germany". A columnist for left-of-center newspapers and magazines, Pandrea openly quarreled with the Iron Guard, though he continued to maintain cordial relations with Guardists such as Radu Gyr. He was also drawn into collaboration with, and possible membership in, the outlawed Romanian Communist Party, acting as a public defender for its repressed activists—though he was more publicly aligned with the leftist wing of the National Peasants' Party, working toward a "popular front". In 1932, he became the brother-in-law of a communist intellectual and conspirator, Lucrețiu Pătrășcanu.

In early 1938, while serving in the Assembly of Deputies, Pandrea caused uproar by joining the far-right National Christian Party. During World War II, he tested the patience of Ion Antonescu's dictatorial regime by defending both Iron-Guard dissidents (rounded up after the civil war of January 1941) and hundreds of people involved in anti-Nazi resistance. He was himself arrested by Siguranța agents on several occasions, but not prosecuted by the regime. While Pătrășcanu gained national prominence, and a seat in government, following the anti-fascist coup of August 1944, Pandrea maintained an independent, increasingly anti-Stalinist line. He provoked the communists, including his brother in law, by seeking fair treatment for prosecuted fascists and Peasantists; he also drafted plans for Romania's "Helvetization" and integration with a larger Balkan Federation, both of which contrasted with the Soviet Union's regional agenda. A victim of inner-party struggles, Pătrășcanu ultimately fell from power in 1948, during the earliest stages of the Romanian communist regime, and Pandrea himself was arrested at around that time. He was held without trial at various facilities, including Ocnele Mari, for almost five years, returning to civilian life as a committed anti-communist and a penitent son of the Romanian Orthodox Church.

Unexpectedly reintegrated as a lawyer, Pandrea again provoked the authorities, as well as church hierarchs, by agreeing to defend marginalized Christian communities, including the nuns of Vladimirești. He was rearrested by the Securitate in 1958, leading to the discovery and confiscation of his secret memoirs, with their unflattering musings about the communists' real-life personas. Moving between various facilities, he was eventually sent to Aiud Prison, braving a starvation regimen; the Securitate suspected that, during his time there, he began networking with the anti-communist resistance, including segments of the Iron Guard. He was selected for the final, least violent, experiment of re-education, and allowed to write (but not publish) controversial diaries detailing his experience. Released during the general amnesty of 1964, he was partly reintegrated in literary life, but kept under watch, and again repressed, for his repeated quarrels with the communist censors. Pandrea died of cancer in 1968, shortly after having published his final work—a monograph on his artist friend, Constantin Brâncuși. He was granted a rehabilitation months after his death; his ethnographer son Andrei fled abroad in 1979, and was sentenced to a prison term in absentia. Both Pandreas were only fully recovered in their native country after the Romanian Revolution of 1989, with Pandrea-father being awarded posthumous membership in the Romanian Academy.

== Biography ==
=== Origin and childhood years ===
Petre Marcu hailed from the ethnographic region of Oltenia, in what was back then the Kingdom of Romania. He was born on 26 June 1904, at Balș, to a middle-income peasant father, Ion Marcu, and his wife Ana (née Albotă). Ion's father had died young, as a soldier in the Romanian Land Forces; he was practically adopted by his father-in-law, who was a wealthy merchant. As described by his son, Ion was a dedicated philanthropist. He allowed impoverished Romanies to settle on his land, and, during the peasants' revolt of 1907, personally intervened to reduce the damages on both sides. The large family, once described by Pandrea himself as "humble" but "indestructible", included twelve siblings, ten of whom were boys. In adulthood, brothers Iancu, Didă and Minel were minor figures in the communist movement—they respectively worked as a merchant, a stationmaster, and a lawyer. Distant relatives include Mircea Vulcănescu, a fellow sociologist who was also Pandrea's ideological foe and his personal friend.

Petre was baptized into the Orthodox Church—although his first years saw him living under an enforced piety (as a youth, he was required to pray eleven times a day), he struggled against his upbringing, describing himself as one who "could not become a believer, and would not become an atheist". The writer was instead proud of his identity as an Oltenian (or more generally Wallachian) peasant. Literary scholar Cornel Ungureanu sees Pandrea as the "archaic man", eternally attached to the "ceremonies [and] rituals of the Oltenian village", and as psychologically integrated within the Oltenian lineage of Romanian writers, leading from Alexandru Macedonski to Marin Sorescu. Pandrea described himself as an admirer of the 1821 Oltenian rebels, led into battle by Tudor Vladimirescu. He identified the latter as an authentic product of Enlightenment, contrasting him to the upper classes—whose version of progressivism Pandrea excoriated as "hedonistic, shameless, [and] cynical". Like Vladimirescu, he reserved particular scorn for the Phanariote element in Romanian society, and extended his attacks on other immigrant groups from the Balkans—he openly declared his hostility toward Aromanians, seeing them as brazen exploiters of the more subservient locals. He was generally welcoming of Jewish intellectuals, as long as they were Oltenian: he once described painter Medi Dinu, who was born in Vâlcea County, as a "superior Jewess"; he also identified Vladimirescu's spirit in novelist Felix Aderca, celebrated by Pandrea as Romania's most important Jewish novelist.

"Pandrea" was originally a family nickname, acquired when the boy would spend hours bathing in ponds formed around the Olteț (in Oltenian dialect, these are known as pandre). Young Marcu completed primary studies in Balș (1911–1915), under teachers such as Constantin Dinculescu, who, as he recalls, were greatly influenced by the leftist doctrinaire Constantin Stere. In 1914, he joined the Scouting Organization and was instructed to keep a diary, which became a lifelong habit. Within the context of Romanian literature, he found inspiration in Mihai Eminescu (a "king" of Romanian poetry, whose conservative stances Pandrea explained as a return to peasant authenticity) and Tudor Arghezi (whom he declared as Romania's greatest living poet).

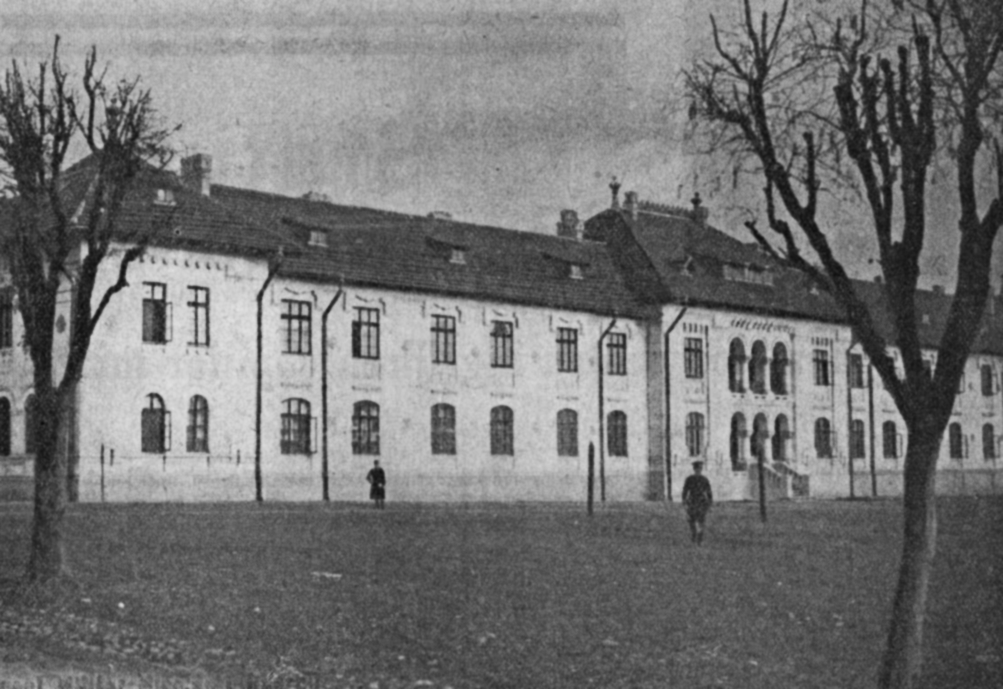
Dealu Monastery school dormitories, in a 1934 photograph

From 1915 to 1922, Pandrea was a student at Dealu Monastery high school (in Târgoviște area), preparing for a career in the Land Forces. His colleagues there included Corneliu Zelea Codreanu, future leader of the fascist Iron Guard, whom he later depicted as a student of meager intelligence. He was instead close to another schoolmate, Nicholas of Romania, the junior son of King Ferdinand I. This friendship gave him his first glimpses of life at the Romanian court. Two other friends were junior members of the aristocratic Ghica family. Vacationing together with them, Pandrea met their uncle, Vladimir Ghika, already famous locally for having converted to Catholicism. Marcu's studies were put on hold in 1916–1917, during The Romanian Debacle of World War I. During the attack on Oltenia, he was still with his father, watching as he buried that season's harvest. By his own testimony, he spent the subsequent interval just behind the new front lines, at Râmnicu Sărat. As a cadet and Scout, he provided support to the regular troops until late 1916, when he was "injured by bombs dropped from a German airplane" and spent a long time recovering at a local hospital. Three other Marcu brothers were drafted for the duration of the conflict (until 1918). One of them, Costică, was killed in combat.

Upon the resumption of classes in 1919, Marcu's teachers included Nae Ionescu, the philosopher and future political intriguer. According to cultural sociologist Zigu Ornea, this "baleful" encounter shaped at least some of Pandrea's later ideas, including his moment of "mystical crisis". Though he came to explicitly reject Ionescu's worldview, he remained forever fascinated by his personality, which, as scholar Ioan Stanomir notes, came to mirror his own. Another author, Alexandru George, sees Pandrea as Ionescu's "actual disciple, possibly the first and the most important, because he was shaped through contrariness." He also reports that Pandrea's late memoirs, which describe Codreanu as Ionescu's favorite pupil, are chronologically inaccurate, and probably mendacious on this point.

=== Debut ===
Literary historian Eugen Simion proposes that the future sociologist, "a fundamentally anarchic type, always at odds with any rules imposed by others", was overall unable to identify with the Dealu ethos. Marcu ultimately decided that he was better suited for a civilian career, once describing himself as a "natural born writer, my generation's strongest." He was already earning his keep as a private tutor to the children of wealthy peasants, and was providing similar services for free to the local orphans. In his final year of high school, he transferred to Carol I National College in Craiova, whence he graduated in 1923, top of his class. In a 1967 letter, he declared that he and his Jewish schoolmates, including Mihail de Mayo and Marcu Stromingher, were students of Marxism, and that they already sympathized with communism. Another colleague and "intimate friend" was the future poet and Iron-Guard militant, Radu Gyr.

By the time of his high-school graduation, Pandrea was working as a legal secretary for Anibal Teodorescu, one of the era's most distinguished attorneys. While in his final year as student in Craiova (where he inhabited a home at 41 Reforma Agrară Street), he had also made his debut in cultural journalism, with an essay hosted by Gândirea journal under a one-letter pseudonym, "A". He was consequently visited by one of the editors, Gib Mihăescu, who asked him to join the regular writing team—without having realized that Marcu's piece had a revolutionary subtext. Using "Petre Diacu" as his signature, he also became a regional columnist for the rival magazine, Viața Romînească. His contributions therein, detailing events in Craiova's cultural life, sparked a public controversy. The city's intellectuals were especially irritated that "Diacu" had mocked the city's national theater as a "non-existent" institution. They "hunted down the author", eventually tracking him to his school; when his identity was uncovered, the schoolmaster gave him a three-day suspension. He remained active in the press after that date, though some of his early contributions remain inscrutable. In October 1924, the local paper Năzuința featured a poem called "My Friend, the Fig Tree". Researchers are divided about its authorship: some see it as a hoax by Pandrea, who presented it as composed by George Bacovia, while others agree that it was in fact a genuine Bacovian piece.

The Craiova protesters had meanwhile asked Ibrăileanu to end his collaboration with the young writer. Ibrăileanu, who had been impressed upon discovering that Pandrea had talent, took his side, inviting him to move to Iași (Marcu never took him up this offer), and adding him to the list of permanent contributors. Pandrea was however shy about his contributions, and for the next forty years prevented anyone from publishing his photograph. Shortly after being acknowledged by Ibrăileanu, he took his Baccalaureate, magna cum laude. He was accepted by the University of Bucharest, where he heard lectures by Ionescu (who had moved on from Dealu), Dimitrie Gusti, and Vasile Pârvan, with the latter becoming his lifelong model. He also heard "some 2—3 lectures" by the respected historian and doctrinaire Nicolae Iorga, but generally avoided him out of shyness, and because Iorga had quarreled with Ibrăileanu.

During his university years, Marcu bonded with the future historian Mihail Polihroniade, in whose home on Lucaci Street he met various young intellectuals of various political hues, including Nicolae Carandino, Mircea Eliade, Petru Comarnescu, Barbu Brezianu, Vasile Marin, Ioan Victor Vojen, and Toma Vlădescu. Pandrea, who amazed his peers with his "multilateral" expertise and his fluent speaking of four languages, had his first political involvement as a leftist: in 1924, he publicly supported French communist Henri Barbusse, who was conferencing in Bucharest, and was beaten up during a standoff with the National-Christian Defense League. In 1925, as part of a field trip, he visited Doftana Prison. It was here that he first became aware of the need for prison reform.

Pandrea took his licentiate in 1926. He then became a Doctor of Juridical Science, again magna cum laude, presenting a paper on the legal philosophy of Simion Bărnuțiu. It first saw print in the academic journal Revista de Drept Public (in 1928), and was then expanded and published as a volume by Editura Fundațiilor Regale (in 1935). Historian Grigore Traian Pop notes that this choice of a subject was "almost bizarre", inaugurating a pattern of eccentricity in Pandrea's scholarly career. In a posthumous review, Sever Voinescu, himself a lawyer a journalist, suggested that the Bărnuțiu monograph was still readable, revealing "Petre Pandrea's exceptional quality as a jurist". Marcu was singled out for the chair of encyclopedic jurisprudence, and sent for specialization at the Humboldt University of Berlin, in Weimar Germany (from 1926). He then also took courses at Heidelberg University and Ludwig-Maximilians-Universität München, and from 1928 or 1929 was employed as a press attaché by the Romanian legation in Berlin. He was reportedly also an "honorary correspondent" of the right-wing Bucharest daily, Curentul. He traveled about, attending lectures at the Universities of Paris, Vienna (where he heard Sigmund Freud), Rome, Prague, and Budapest. While in France, he met and befriended the Oltenian expatriate sculptor, Constantin Brâncuși.

=== "White Lily" period and Marxist conversion ===
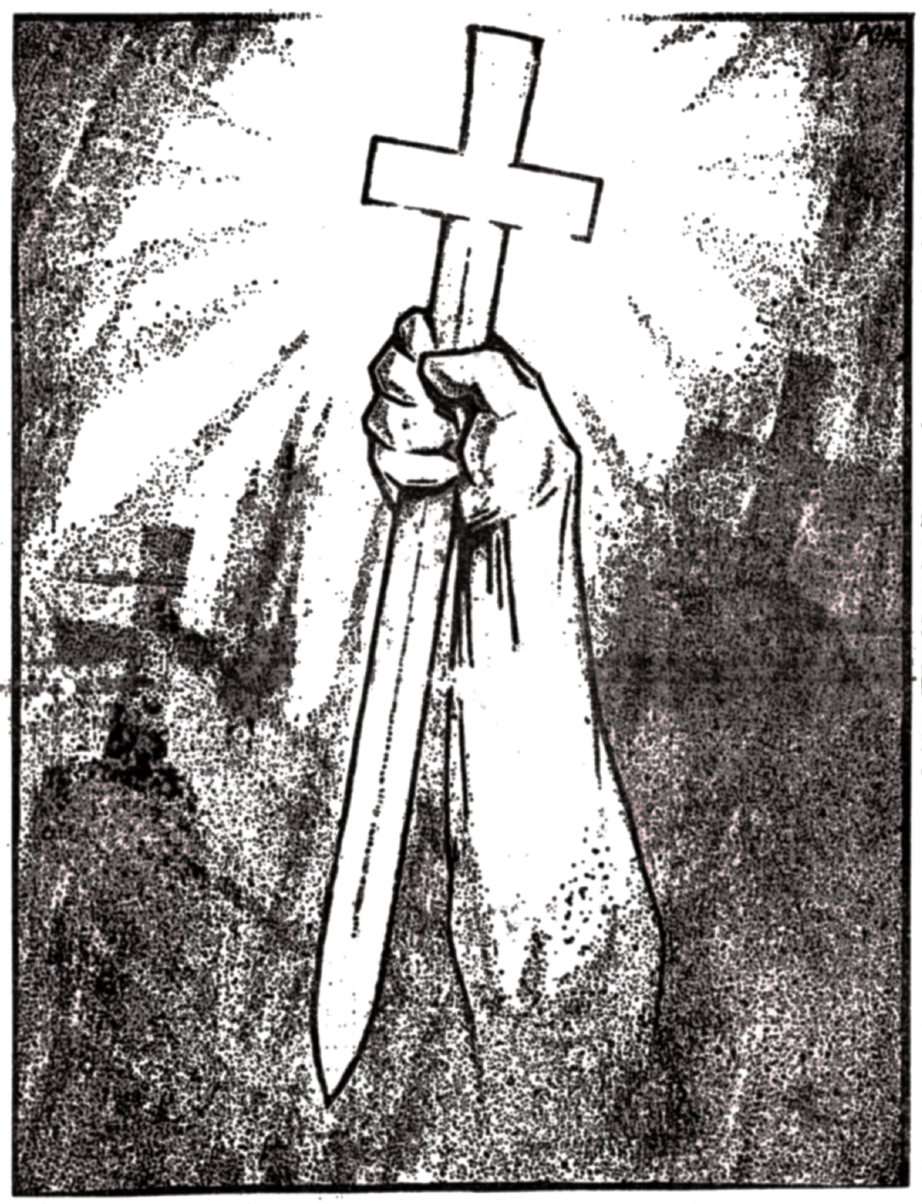
Allegory of Nichifor Crainic's Christian militancy (January 1933 drawing by Victor Ion Popa)

Briefly involved in historical research, Pandrea traced down and publish a medieval manuscript by Albertus Schendl, detailing the life and times of Stephen the Great. His effort was rewarded by Iorga, who was serving as Prime Minister of Romania, and who granted him 1,000 Reichsmark. The aspiring scholar maintained his verbal contract with Gândirea, which published a succession of his articles, including coverage of Walther Rathenau's letters and an overview of Pârvan's "philosophy of the state". Pandrea kept informed about cultural events in Greater Romania, initially declaring himself opposed to the rationalist, left-liberal, Francophile bent that had emerged as dominant in the 1920s. He was disgusted by literary theorists such as Eugen Lovinescu and Paul Zarifopol, writing them off as unoriginal, the "anemic offshoots" of Jules Lemaître and Émile Faguet. To set himself apart from this intellectual movement, Pandrea issued the "White Lily Manifesto"—co-written with Ion Nestor and Sorin Pavel, and taken up by Gândirea in 1928. It largely supported a new path in literature, centered on "frenetic concreteness", but also regarded Christian mysticism as a legitimate source of artistic inspiration. Historian Lucian Boia, who sees the manifesto as a theoretical milestone for the "new generation" of 1930, also finds it confusing, "comprising diverse and jumbled things."

The opus was described, initially mockingly (in a review by Șerban Cioculescu), as the ideological cornerstone of Trăirism—from a trăi, "to live". This term was appropriated in later scholarship, with George proposing that the "White Lily" represents a "historic moment in the affirmation of a Trăirist generation", being especially "delirious" and "humorless" among those fundamental texts. Ornea suggests that Pandrea was being driven into the reactionary, "programmatic" side of Gândirism by Ionescu—but also by his own "temperamental anarchism". Ornea additionally notes that the magazine had been taken over by an increasingly pro-fascist editor, Nichifor Crainic, who used and "probably incited" the White Lily, and later made Pandrea his in-house sociologist. Similarly, historian Radu Ioanid proposes that Pandrea had been genuinely transformed by Crainic, and further influenced by Charles Maurras, in fully rejecting the tenets of Romanian liberalism. Pandrea himself reports that he was mainly guided by his own spiritual crisis, having spent much time reading the Bible, alongside commentary by Nikolai Berdyaev, Henri Bergson, and Jacques Maritain. Berdyayev and Maritain were identified as distinct influences in a 2004 overview by critic Dan C. Mihăilescu, who also found echoes from Friedrich Nietzsche, Ludwig Klages, Oswald Spengler, and the Russian Slavophiles (Aleksey Khomyakov, Konstantin Aksakov, Ivan Kireyevsky).

The White Lily was taken as a provocation by liberal circles, inaugurating a "resounding polemic". In a 2002 monograph, researcher Tudor Opriș describes the aftershock of the "voluble and vehement manifesto", including its being used by the Education Ministry as a pretext for designing new cultural policies targeting the youth. These were officially described as a "channel[ing] of youthful energy" into a "healthy direction", and away from the Lily's "snot-faced" radicalism. Independent of this initiative, Viața Romînească also expressed condemnation of Gândirea, primarily through a "celebrated essay" penned by its leading columnist, Mihai Ralea. The latter was especially derisive of Pandrea's religiousness, calling him out as a Romanian "Rasputin".

By 1930, Marcu was already contradicting himself: tormented by questions about the future of mankind, he took his clues from Rathenau's political philosophy, and later from Leo Tolstoy, Mahatma Gandhi, Xavier Léon, and Romain Rolland. At this stage, he was enthusiastic about the possibility of a "left-wing democracy". Seeking the company of proletarians, he boarded for a while with a bricklayer in Wedding. Somewhat inspired by the efforts of Aristide Briand, he also embraced socialist pacifism, and renounced all paths toward becoming an army officer. He was offered initiation into the Freemasonry, but rejected it on his father's advice.

Young Pandrea eventually came across dialectical materialism, which resulted in "his moral and social nonconformism [being] set up on a different basis"; he now believed that the existential void, which became an "obsessive" theme in his writings, could only be tackled through "labor and the trinity of art–science–skill." By 1944, he was embracing anti-intellectualism, arguing that most scholars were dogmatists with "their mind darkened", and that only a "dialectical intelligence" could still save itself. Stanomir, who equates this stance with atheism, also notes that Pandrea was rare among Romanian interwar figures in his voluntary embrace of Marxism, albeit as an "unfaithful and impure" disciple. Similarly, political scientist Vladimir Tismăneanu covers Pandrea as a man of the generic left, who deep down hoped for a "Hegelian synthesis of capitalism and socialism." Ornea, who met and conversed with Pandrea in later decades, opined that the ideological transition, though marked by Marcu's reinvention as "Petre Pandrea", was never clear-cut. As he wrote in 1981:

Petre Pandrea is known for his contradictory status, as one who, with his resounding gestures, had crossed over from the right to the radical left in 1931. In truth, this year that now seems to stand as a wall is merely a date used for convenience. As a matter of fact, those of us who are truly acquainted with his work understand that his ideological rationales are timidly present before that date, just as his anarchic nonconformity, present early on, will have endured as a diffuse state after that moment.

Working under Neohegelians such as Carl Rudolf Smend, Pandrea prepared an unorthodox paper on the legal philosophy of Montesquieu, which only covered 71 pages and was ultimately presented in 1932. In 1931, he self-published a dissertation on administrative reform in Romania. Viața Romînească employed him as a staff contributor, this time under his consecrated pseudonym—with a series on the political scandal involving Constantin Stere, and also with a set of articles called Încotro? ("Where To?"), which Pandrea himself defined as marking his conversion to Marxism-Leninism. These were enthusiastically read by the magazine's founder, Garabet Ibrăileanu, who believed that Pandrea was stepping up to replace Constantin Dobrogeanu Gherea as Romania's leading Marxist theoretician. With his defense of Stere, Marcu took on Romanian nationalism, describing himself (and other young intellectuals) as duped by the nationalists and the anti-democracy activists. His analysis featured a derisive quote from Nae Ionescu, who had defined nationhood as a "community of love and of life", adding to it his own comment: A se slăbi ("Let's not"). With a 1931 article in Adevărul Literar și Artistic, he described nationalism as a bourgeois distraction. Favoring instead the staples of proletarian internationalism, he now asserted: "We neither find useful nor accept the idea of 'national' cultures". His other contributions were a short account of Montesquieu's awareness of Wallachian topics, as well as several essays on psychoanalysis and psychoanalytic literary criticism (such as one which discussed Panait Istrati's "Oedipus complex").

=== Anti-fascist credentials ===
1931 logo of the Peasant Workers' Bloc

Pandrea gave up his position in the diplomatic corps in 1931, handing in his resignation to Prime Minister Iorga—though he continued to receive a salary from the legation until 1933. During an extended stay in Romania for the parliamentary elections of 1931, he was drawn toward the outlawed Romanian Communist Party (PCR or PCdR). He endorsed the group's front organization, called Peasant Workers' Bloc. Several of its members won seats in the Assembly of Deputies, where they formed their own caucus—with Pandrea as its secretary—before having their mandates invalidated. His ideological shift, and especially his stance in support of Stere, were disliked by the increasingly right-wing circle at Gândirea. Noting the "horrible" takeover maneuvers by Crainic, he suspended his collaboration with a formal letter of resignation. He then amused himself by collecting negative reviews of his defection to the left-wing press, noting that Crainic and Pamfil Șeicaru had declared him to be "dead", and that bishop Grigorie Comșa had called him a "lost soul". Ionescu finally engaged Pandrea in a polemic through Cuvântul daily. At issue was Pandrea's support for constitutionalism, but the dispute degenerated into one about intellectual lineage. Pandrea, who responded through columns in Dreptatea, was upset that his adversary still viewed him as a disciple; he also professed his belief that Ionescu's Orthodox-supremacist ideology was aping political Catholicism, adding only a touch of "Byzantinism".

This period witnessed Pandrea's engagement with anti-fascism. This was partly spurred on by his personal friendship with Georgi Dimitrov, future secretary of the Communist International, whom he helped as a legal counsel during the Reichstag fire trial. On his trips back to Bucharest, Pandrea carried Dimitrov's clandestine propaganda, which ultimately reached Bulgaria. As Boia notes, it is virtually impossible to know whether he ever joined the PCR, since the clandestine group only marked affiliations "through basic verbal communication". He was in any case kept under watch by the old-regime secret police, called Siguranța, as one of the intellectuals who seemed to be serving the communist agenda. In his manuscripts, Pandrea himself clarifies that he was not a party man, but an independent Marxist-Leninist, and that he viewed the PCR leadership as incompetent. A literary friend, Virgil Carianopol, believes that Pandrea had indeed "rallied with the workers' movement and the Romanian Communist Party", and claims that Eliza "had the same convictions as her husband."

In July 1932, Dreptatea hosted Marcu's critique of Crainic's alliances with groups such as the Iron Guard, seen by Pandrea as "utterly devoid of human generosity and with universality not on their horizon." Pandrea was also a foreign correspondent for the Romanian daily, Adevărul, with reportage pieces which warned about the Nazis' steady rise to power, depicting Nazism itself as an "ideological expression of the petty bourgeoisie, as engineered by the great capitalists". These pieces were collected into the 1933 brochure Germania hitleristă ("Hitlerian Germany")—described by literary historian Mircea Moisa as "the first book in European political literature to outline a most serious warning about fascism's criminal potential." Ungureanu similarly commends Pandrea for having identified early on "the true face of fascism" and "the enormous evil of Nazism." The book suggested that Adolf Hitler had duped anti-capitalists by pretending to favor social ownership, which, as the "lackey of great capital", he never intended to actually implement. In his foreword, Pandrea clarified that, in addition to applying "historical materialism", he had taken clues from "reactionary and progressive" books by various authors, ranging from Max Weber, Werner Sombart and Ernst Robert Curtius to Carl Schmitt and Max Scheler. Pandrea would later take pride in noting that Germania hitleristă had predicted both World War II (seen by him as Hitler's necessary diversion) and the eventual destruction of fascism.

Pandrea once confessed that Nazi racial theories had affected his own career choices, in that he decided to quit Germany for good after a native student had called him a "filthy Balkanoid" to his face. While still in Germany, he had become close friends with another jurist and intellectual, Lucrețiu Pătrășcanu, who was secretly engaged with the PCR. Upon returning home and enlisting at the bar association in Ilfov County, Pandrea married Pătrășcanu's sister, Eliza. The civil ceremony took place in April 1932, just before Pandrea fulfilled his service in the Land Forces, with an infantry regiment stationed at Caracal; their son, Andrei Dumitru Marcu (known professionally as "Andrei Pandrea"), was born in March 1936. The couple also had a daughter, Nadia, born in 1940 or 1941.

On the legal front, Pandrea was a "distinguished member" of the National Peasants' Party (PNȚ), though he later claimed that was never formally affiliated with that group. Alongside Ralea, he helped consolidate the PNȚ's leftist tendency. By August 1932, he was serving as editor of Dreptatea, and a participant in the PNȚ's ideological round-tables, which sought to define the "peasant state" as a diametrical opposite of the "liberal state". Pandrea was also a full-time reporter at Adevărul, with his domicile registered as 2 Albă Street. He consolidated his left-wing affiliations with "vitriolic" articles in Adevărul, Dimineața, Azi and Bluze Albastre, using pseudonyms such as Petre Albotă, Gaius, Petre Dragu, Dr. Petru Ionică, Dr. X, and Dr. P, as well as his consecrated pen name. Now fully reconciled with Ralea, he also established two self-styled Marxist reviews—Viitorul Social, followed by Stânga. The latter magazine, which proclaimed that it had "no adversaries on the left", was supported with articles by Petre Țuțea and Traian Herseni, both of whom would later reemerge on the right. Viitorul Social was almost immediately after closed down by the Siguranța. Stânga only appeared for nineteen issues, being shut down by government immediately after endorsing the Grivița strike of 1933. The order reportedly came from Armand Călinescu, who was Minister of the Interior for an embarrassed PNȚ cabinet. When a Siguranța agent stepped into the editorial offices to order their closure, Pandrea had to be persuaded not hit him over the head with an inkwell.

Pandrea was still welcomed at Dreptatea, where, in February 1933, he mocked the far-right's emerging caucus as "an immense ideological distraction from the true front of contemporary combat." He came to ridicule the Iron Guard's mystical approach, since: "An organic incompatibility exists between the Christian religion, and especially so the Orthodox creed, and racial hatred. Orthodoxy has always been tolerant, in the context of Romanian history." The German Legation in Bucharest made some attempts to buy off all copies of Germania hitleristă before they could be sold, and, when this failed, the Gestapo blacklisted Padrea. He reportedly enjoyed "extraordinary success" with this book, and continued to write about the topic, enough to have been able to put together a second volume. He was co-opted to serve on the editorial team at Cuvântul Liber. He later claimed to have co-written many of its editorial pieces, usually signed by the credited editor-in-chief, Tudor Teodorescu-Braniște—"the most consequential democratic and anti-fascist journalist of my era." During early 1934, his extensive critique of nationalism (and in particular his metaphor of the "ethnic brute" that had been let loose), caused him to be exposed under his real name by his former colleagues at Curentul. In doing so, they also commented on his "bourgeois" past, and threatened to publish his earlier letters to the editor.

=== "Popular front" period ===
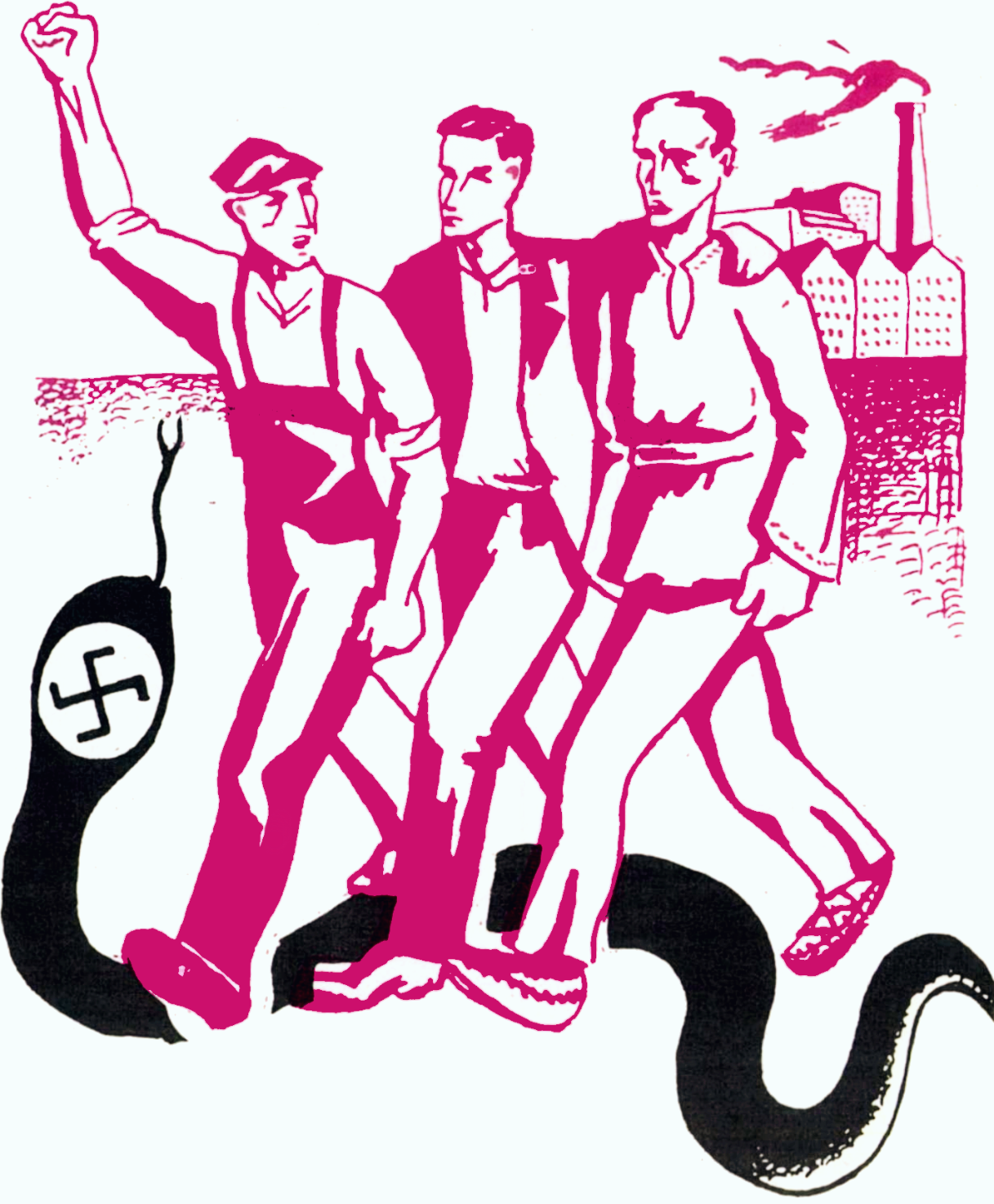
Depiction of the popular front against fascism in a Cuvântul Liber cartoon of 1935

Pandrea announced that he was working on a "social novel", Tractorul, fragments of which were published by Vremea daily in October 1932. The newspaper reported that the book was nearly finished, and that it had generated a "lively debate" among those intellectuals who had read it. His scholarly tract, Psihanaliza juridică ("The Psychoanalysis of Law"), appeared at Cultura Românească in 1933; Moisa proposes that it was co-written by Pătrășcanu. Pandrea also penned a treatise on economic doctrines as applied to the Great Depression in Romania. This had not yet been published in July 1935, making him ineligible for a professorship at the Bucharest Academy of Economic Studies, where his application was subsequently rejected. A self-confessed contrarian, Pandrea also decided to take up unpopular causes, and became a defender for PCR militants in various trials of the period. As Pandrea's confidant, literary historian Ovid S. Crohmălniceanu notes that he took pride in tending to "lepers", or cases that other lawyers deemed unapproachable. He likened Pandrea to the Dănilă Prepeleac—a figure out of Ion Creangă's fairy tales, who confronts and out-pranks the Devil himself. Writer Ilie Purcaru, who met and befriended Pandrea in the 1960s, reports that his personal style of arguing, including at the bar, involved "suffocating the opponent" with a barrage of facts and factoids, reflecting a "feverish mindset". Pandrea's first client of this political category was Aladar Imre. The trial ended with a no-show, because Imre fled (or, according to Pandrea, was secretly expelled) into Hungary. In the 1930s, he organized the defense of PCR activists such as Constanța Crăciun and Ion Vincze, and of the second lot of Grivița strikers.

For a few months in 1934, Pandrea stood in for George Călinescu as a literary columnist at Adevărul Literar și Artistic. This activity, which (as Ornea reports) was casually forgotten by his biographers, saw him covering works by Ralea, Felix Aderca, Sergiu Dan, Camil Petrescu, Victor Ion Popa, Mihail Sadoveanu, and Ilya Ehrenburg. In this field, he modeled himself on Georg Brandes and Hippolyte Taine; he was also the first Romanian critic to discuss Robert Musil as a major European novelist. In October 1934, Pandrea was among the founding members of a Bucharest branch of Amicii URSS society, supporting a détente between Romania and the Soviet Union. In his old-age manuscripts, Pandrea revealed that, in 1934–1935, he had become aware of communist realities, being introduced to them by his colleague Alexandru Sahia. Sahia had visited the Soviet Union and had returned publicly enthusiastic, but secretly horrified; according to Pandrea, the NKVD had arrested Sahia during his short stay, enough for him to be infected with tuberculosis (from which he died in 1937). In April 1935, Istrati, a similarly disillusioned communist, had died of the same disease. Pandrea was among those attending the funeral, which was organized by an Iron Guard dissidence, the "Crusade of Romanianism". He himself was greatly alarmed by the Moscow trials, and especially by the public humiliation of Nikolai Bukharin and Christian Rakovsky, whom he admired.

In August 1935, Pandrea was elected head of the PNȚ chapter in Bucharest's Black Sector. Also then, Dimineața featured a call for a "popular front" of the leftist forces. The article was signed by Pandrea (who also claimed it as the first-ever programmatic document on that topic), but, according to communist militant Ștefan Voicu, it was entirely authored by Pătrășcanu. Pandrea's activity at the bar was complimented by his public stances in Adevărul, where he addressed the 1936 Craiova Trial and spoke of its chief defendant, Ana Pauker, as a martyr of anti-fascism. He was similarly involved in supporting the communist academic Petre Constantinescu-Iași, who was facing trial at Chișinău. In his coverage of the affair, he suggested that Constantinescu-Iași was being framed by a rival professor, Ioan Gheorghe Savin; Savin sued him for damages, and in July 1936 Pandrea was facing prosecution for defamatory libel. Other articles he penned during that interval lauded the Ploughmen's Front and other "left-wing workers' organizations" for having agreed to endorse the PNȚ. He soon attracted negative attention from the Iron Guard's daily, Porunca Vremii, which described him as a "communist dandy"; a Guardist ideologue, Vasile Marin, listed him among the enemies of the Romanian nation. In that context, Adevărul came under fire from its right-wing rival, Universul, which suggested that it was advancing Jewish and "un-Romanian" interests; Adevărul defended itself with a list of Romanian affiliates, which included Pandrea's name. By then, Universul publisher Stelian Popescu had sued Pandrea for blackmail, with their case presented before a judge in September 1936.

In June 1936, Pandrea had returned to Caracal, where he inaugurated a PNȚ "school for propagandists". Later that year, he focused his attention on combating censorship and the state of siege which still governed parts of the country. In his articles, he described these two not just as anomalous, but also as ill-conceived, since they left the populace without an innocent outlet for their sentiments, and encouraged it to take up political violence. For the remainder of the interwar, Pandrea was an opinion-maker, contributing "hundreds of articles and essays" in philosophy and sociology, but also in social, literary and art criticism. According to Pop, such works, many of which describe Romania as prey to exploitative capitalism, are largely unscientific, with assessments that Pandrea keeps intentionally vague. The writings' importance is in sampling their author's "ideological and political attitude". Their unifying threads, Pop argues, were a "dialectical spirit" and an interest in social psychology—though Pandrea insisted on defining himself primarily as a "sociologist", or, more jokingly, a "vulgar sociologist". The essayist was briefly reunited with Brâncuși in June 1937, when the sculptor had returned to Romania to work on the Infinity Column. On his visit to Brâncuși's atelier, he was joined by Țuțea, by director Haig Acterian, as well as by lawyer and writer Arșavir Acterian.

These activities also brought Pandrea to national attention as a controversialist. In his contribution as a social critic, he had expressed occasional derision of the Jewish community, defending Romanian novelist Ionel Teodoreanu against accusations of antisemitism. As he argued at the time, the claims against Teodoreanu were samples of "Jewish chauvinism". While still advocating for the "popular front", Pandrea had become deeply inimical toward another one of Ionescu's renegade pupils, Mihail Sebastian, whom he depicted as an anti-communist "hooligan". His rival responded in a Vremea article during September 1934. Noting that he did not consider it relevant enough to address the object of Pandrea's ire, he depicted him as a political profiteer ("a Hitlerite in 1928, a communist in 1931, and a National-Peasantist in 1932"), then proceeded to list and correct Pandrea's grammatical mistakes. In his later diaries, Pandrea acknowledges that his disgust referred to Sebastian's status as a Siguranța informant and concealed homosexuality. Essayist and biographer Mihai Iovănel observed that, while the former allegation remains unproven, the claims advanced about Sebastian's same-sex relationships may be regarded as "plausible". By 1937, the nationalists at Universul and Neamul Românesc had come to allege that Pandrea was himself an apologist for pederasty, and a likely pederast himself—these accusations relied on quotes from Germania hitleristă, wherein he described the Nazis' brutality toward homosexuals.

=== PNC and wartime dictatorships ===
As a result of inconclusive elections in December 1937, King Carol II assigned power to the far-right National Christian Party (PNC). Running on the PNȚ lists in Romanați County, Pandrea himself was elected to the Assembly of Deputies on 20 December. According to the PNȚ's Patria newspaper, the "far-left doctrinaire" immediately went over to the PNC, hoping to be appointed as prefect. The same source alleged that Pandrea had tried to take control of the prefecture, but had been met with resistance, and was hospitalized during the resulting scuffle. A later article in the same Patria indicated that he had been chased out, or "chided" (muștruluit), by the PNC's own militia, or Lăncieri. Other reports simply had: "Mr Petre Pandrea's supposed appointment as prefect of Romanați has been refuted." On the first day of 1938, Pandrea had handed in his resignation from the PNȚ, siding with a pro-government dissident group that also included Armand Călinescu and Virgil Potârcă. He explained himself as motivated by his enduring belief in a "national, monarchic, peasant State", which the PNȚ leader Iuliu Maniu had betrayed. He was concurrently expelled from the PNȚ, who noted that he had formally registered with the PNC. His "strange, bewildering 'conversion'" to nationalism was mocked by his schoolmate Radu Gyr, on behalf of the Iron Guard. Gyr reminded his readers that Pandrea, "that political conman", had once stood for communism.

Soon after the PNC moment, Romania embraced full authoritarianism, inaugurated with a self-coup by Carol II, and enshrined in the February 1938 constitution. Pandrea was privately disgusted by this political change, and especially infuriated by Carol's co-operation with the Orthodox Patriarch, Miron Cristea, since it had destroyed the Church's good reputation. He continued to appear at trials of repressed communists, and cited the new legal provisions to their advantage. Other scholarly contributions by Pandrea were printed as part of a 1938 textbook on penal procedure (Procedura penală). In June of that year, alongside Popa, Dem I. Dobrescu, Henri H. Stahl and Traian Brăileanu, he accompanied Dimitrie Gusti of the Royal Foundations on an official tour of Romanați—including to the model village of Dioști. In October, Pandrea attended the International Congress of Criminology in Rome, presenting a paper on criminal profiling in pairs of twins. Also in 1938, Pandrea published his translation of Aurel Popovici's Vereinigten Staaten von Gross-Österreich. According to Ungureanu, he may have picked up this particular text because it matched his own designs about a Balkan Federation. Pandrea supported the notion that Popovici had wanted to include Romania-proper into a regional union, formed around the Habsburg monarchy. Historian Theodor Rășcanu argued that, in order to highlight such claims, Pandrea had falsified portions of Popovici's text, replacing the word "Bukovina" with "Romania". The translator was also noted for taking distance from Popovici's racialist and antisemitic remarks, with notes which suggested that these still needed to be backed up by science.

In late January 1939, the Ilfov tribunal sentenced Pandrea to a one-month prison term, as punishment for libel against Nicolae Iorga. By March, he had returned to his practice and was proclaimed, through a royal decree, as the main attorney for the Ministry of Army Supplies. After the outbreak of World War II, Pandrea watched on as Carol and Armand Călinescu purged the Iron Guard and the related far-right movements, who had been driven into opposing the monarchy. Years later, he defined this episode as a political genocide, a culmination of Călinescu's betrayals of his comrades, and as one of Romania's "national shames". He especially deplored Nae Ionescu's death, and circulated rumors according to which his erstwhile mentor had been discreetly killed on Carol's orders, either with poisoned cigarettes or a lethal injection.

After Carol's ouster in 1940, and down to 1944, Romania was ruled upon by Ion Antonescu, who pursued an alliance with Nazi Germany and the Axis powers. In its first phase, his government presented as a "National Legionary State", with the Iron Guard as an equal partner. The Guardists settled their scores with old-regime figures, including Iorga; according to Pandrea, Iorga was responsible for his own death, since his brand of nationalism and antisemitism had produced the Guard. Pandrea himself was arrested in Caracal, in November 1940—he was appearing there as a lawyer for the co-operative of Morunglav. In December, he joined the defense team at a mass trial involving the Union of Communist Youth in Iași, and was again jailed. He blamed this debacle on Ralea, who had arranged the defense, and on Istrate Micescu, who joined the team of attorneys only to betray them.

Following a brief civil war in January 1941, Antonescu repressed and outlawed the Guard. Pandrea again tested official dogmas by acting as a public defender for the imprisoned Guardists. He was again friends with the now-captive Gyr, describing him as a fellow "Mandarin" of Romanian culture. While still ridiculing Gyr's fascist tirades, he was persuaded that Gyr had been wrongly framed as an insurrectionist. Pandrea still published a number of brochures on legal topics, commissioning a printing press manned by the inmates of Văcărești Prison. This enterprise also put out an academic journal, Revista Română de Criminologie, edited by a team comprising Pandrea and other opponents of the Antonescu regime, namely Constantin Ion Parhon and V. V. Stanciu. This project was designed as a discreet form of material support for the PCR's prison elite, including Teohari Georgescu.

=== Meridian and August coup ===
On 22 June 1941, Antonescu engaged Romanian troops in the Nazi-led invasion of the Soviet Union. A "merciful fluke" prevented Pandrea from being called under arms—his Caracal regiment was decimated not two days later, at Țiganca. Though he had kept company with high-ranking figures such as Mihai Antonescu, Siguranța agents again kept track of his activities as one of the "publicly notorious communist elements", observing his "close links" with another political suspect, the journalist Ion Vinea. He visited frequently with Pătrășcanu, who had been placed under house arrest at his villa in Poiana Țapului, on the Prahova Valley. Pandrea brought him virtually all the books that Pătrășcanu used in writing his own sociological tracts. A self-reported "millionaire", Pandrea was more proud of his return to defend the PCR-led side of anti-Nazi resistance. He confessed that he financed himself by overcharging his other clients, who were mainly Oltenian traders, facing trial in Bucharest for "economic sabotage and price gouging" (other groups he extorted included deserters from the Eastern Front). By his own account, he partly dedicated himself to obtaining justice for persecuted religious communities, including the Baptists. He joined efforts with his old friend Vladimir Ghika, who was bringing food and spiritual comfort to all inmates, "without even caring about their creed, class, or race."

Pandrea claimed that in early 1941, using funds extorted from a "tanner out of Calafat", he established the Meridian group, formally led by Alexandru Balaci, Mihnea Gheorghiu, and Tiberiu Iliescu, and disguising itself as a "literary society". The eponymous magazine, handled by Iliescu and pout out from Craiova, featured Pandrea's own defense of his former colleague G. Călinescu, whose synthesis of Romanian literature had sparked anger in far-right circles. Pandrea defied them and the Antonescus, writing that Călinescu's tract needed to be "translated into all the languages of people that have maintained diplomatic relations with us." Pandrea's boast was partly counterfactual, since Meridian had been founded as an avant-garde magazine in 1934; its other details are contradicted by Iliescu's own account:

When I first met [Pandrea] he was on one of his regular visits to Craiova. As a lawyer, he would show up for various commercial lawsuits [and he] never came alone. He always had multicolored girl typists by his side. He was vaguely interested in the lawsuits, and cared more about cultural affairs. He was all smiles, perky, original, and always on his way to Balș, his hometown. [...] That man was an eternal adolescent, with only the most immediate concerns. Already possessing a high culture, he had acquired, in his middle age, all sorts of information in matters of politics, ethnography, and propaganda. He was all wasteful, except when it came to his immediate interests. I loved in him his erudition and wastefulness. He had this funny way of not adhering to anything. [...] I make it known publicly: he never ever gave me any assistance, neither intellectual nor monetary!

Meridian's networking and advocacy pressured Ion Antonescu into sparing the lives of several hundred Romanian-and-Jewish militants, who had been rounded up by the Siguranța at Mediaș. In all, Pandrea claimed to have obtained reprieve for over 300 men and women, many of whom risked the death penalty; he sometimes inflated this count, suggesting that 1,000 communists owed him their lives. Pandrea also noted that the resentful authorities had twice arrested him for this activity—in 1942, and again in 1943. On one of these occasions, he was jailed alongside the communist lawyer Ion Gheorghe Maurer and the National Liberal journalist Paul Dimitriu.

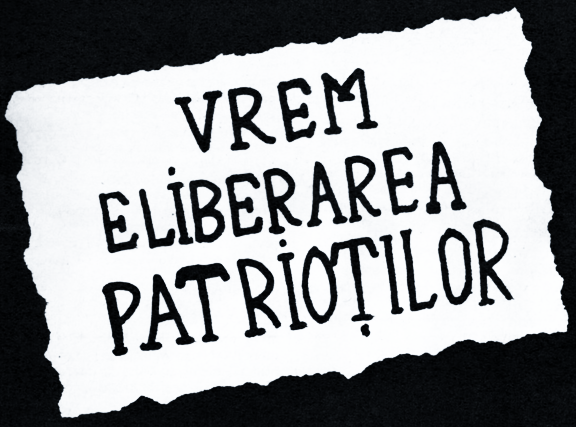
1944 leaflet circulated by the anti-Nazi resistance networks, expressing support for the Union of Patriots, and demanding that its members be released from custody

Pandrea also ensured the legal defense for communist militant Francisc Panet and his wife Lili, but was unable to obtain that they be spared execution. During early 1943, he obtained the release of his client Zigmund Ströbel, who stood accused of having obtained false papers for the Zloczover family of Bukovina Jews. In his plea, he demonstrated that the Zloczovers had helped Ströbel escape with his life after the Soviet invasion of 1940. A while after, Pandrea represented Elena Duca, imprisoned for having refused to declare her stash of Napoléons. He successfully argued that simply holding out gold in one's possession was not a breach of Antonescu's legislation regarding "sabotage". He himself reported other victories in litigation against the Antonescian regime—as a lawyer for Belgian sociétés anonymes and for the International Red Cross.

In mid-1944, Pandrea involved himself in defending the Union of Patriots—his individual clients included Gheorghe Vlădescu-Răcoasa, Mihai Magheru, Manea Mănescu, and Paul Georgescu. He was in on the preparation of an anti-fascist coup on 23 August, helping Pătrășcanu hide out in several "conspiratorial houses", where he worked on drafting the anti-Antonescu proclamation, later read out by King Michael I. According to Mihăilescu, the coup organizers partly relied on Pandrea's funding. Another lawyer and conspirator, Avram Bunaciu, recalled Pandrea himself was not tolerated by Pătrășcanu, who showed him "no consideration", and who kept him out of clandestine meetings occurring in Pandrea's own home.

=== Communist takeover ===
Upon Ion Antonescu's capture and neutralization, Romania applied to join the Allies, and the PCR was allowed to organize legally—with Pătrășcanu himself emerging as a player in national politics, and made minister of justice. According to Moisa, Pandrea did not fully fit the trend: "a constantly left-wing (but not communist) figure", he opted for preserving his intellectual independence, and "did not accept any offer" to join the government apparatus. Pandrea himself partly contradicted such notions, writing: "I never sought the pork-belly, but rather supported the construction of communism through a general disentanglement, after 23 August 1944". From October 1944, he joined Maurer and Bunaciu on the "Group of Democratic Lawyers". The same month, he appeared as a defender of Radu C. Ștefan, the left-wing mayor of Buciumeni-Ilfov, who had been deposed and arrested by the Sănătescu cabinet. In his plea, he alleged that the latter's non-communist ministers still wanted fascism to win. He also joined the Romanian Society for Friendship with the Soviet Union and its Sociological Section, whose chairman was Sabin Manuilă.

These conformist stances were contrasted by Pandrea's other gestures. In 1945, he again defended Gyr, who was being tried by the Romanian People's Tribunals, and unusually prosecuted by their former schoolmate Mihail de Mayo. He engaged in heated disputes with both Mayo and Pătrășcanu, finally obtaining that Gyr receive the minimum sentence. Around the same time, a Guardist factional leader, Nicolae Petrașcu, begged Pandrea and Petre Țuțea to intervene with Pătrășcanu, in hopes that they could prevent the mass execution of Guardist commandos captured in the Ciucaș Mountains. While refusing to advance politically, Pandrea made his comeback as a writer—in May 1946, he was elected into the Romanian Writers' Society. A second series of Meridian had him discussing Brâncuși, the "sociology and metaphysics of Oltenia", as well as the "enigma that was Nae Ionescu". He contributed two volumes of Portrete și controverse ("Portraits and Controversies", 1945–1947), seen by Ornea as "charmingly enticing", "learned without being doctoral". Simion was impressed by his "cantankerous, intelligent and colorful style", which brought together political "diagnostics" and literary observations. Also here, Pandrea completed his Marxist study of Romanian nationalism, and of antisemitism in general, describing both as bygone tools for distracting the proletariat. The book garnered instant praise from the Democratic Peasants' Party, which had aligned itself with the PCR; as observed by the PNȚ press, the promotional material included Pandrea's biography, but omitted all mention of his 1938 defection to the PNC.

The book angered members of the newly repressed right-wing movements, in particular for their impressions on Iuliu Maniu and Corneliu Zelea Codreanu. Some chapters also reprise Pandrea's critique of Ionescu—the Ionescian disciple Mircea Vulcănescu, who read the volume, described these as an "interesting testimony" by "a former student", but also as ultimately mendacious and self-serving. According to Iovănel, the text still did justice to Ionescu with an exploration of his intellectual biography, including his debt to Symbolism. As Stanomir remarks, many of these pieces also serve to consolidate a "Pătrășcanu myth": Pandrea compares his brother-in-law to Heracles, and Romania to the Augean Stables; he also fashions Pătrășcanu into an intellectual heir of Romania's left-wing traditions, including Poporanism. Portrete și controverse mapped out Pandrea's core ideas on "localism". More or less explicitly based on ideas borrowed from Pârvan and Nae Ionescu, it stands as a defense of embedded Romanian traditions over Westernization, openly rejecting Westernizers such as Titu Maiorescu and Ion Luca Caragiale.

Pandrea expanded on "localism" with a 1946 volume, Pomul vieții ("Tree of Life"), which is also a philosophical diary of the two previous years. It was poorly covered by critics such as Vladimir Streinu, who rated it is as sophomoric, but was later praised by Ungureanu for "contain[ing] the true art of living." Dispensing advice and aphorisms that are rooted in the peasant psyche, the book depicts its author as a solitary and self-sufficient man, who only steps into the public arena when he needs to contain the spread of mediocrity. Pandrea was additionally interviewed by Ion Biberi for a 1945 book on "the world of tomorrow", which saw him elaborating his ideas on the inevitable advent of a "socialist morality", but also his discussing poetics and the typology of Romanian poets. Also then, he had issued a scholarly volume on "dialectical criminology", which was partly directed against the highly punitive and "reactionary" school of criminal law, embodied by Vintilă Dongoroz and his followers. This tract is described by Voinescu as Pandrea's juridical masterpiece:

[His] style is fascinating and vigorous, dynamic and captivating. Only a handful of Romanian authors in the field of law have this ability to lead their reader toward their own conclusion, without offending their taste or causing them annoyance. Petre Pandrea takes his reader on an adventure, with every page as a new act in this total spectacle. Quotes from Tolstoy or insights into a judge's psychology are endlessly mixed into a colorful blend, alongside digressions out of sociology and Marx, and not for a second is there even a hint of facile improvisation, or of fake scholarship. [...] The sincere manner of its writing is what renders this book immortal.

The PCR ascendancy was consolidated on the last day of 1947, when it did away with the monarchy and proclaimed a Romanian People's Republic. The transition was assisted by the Soviet occupiers, and was helped along by Pătrășcanu. Pandrea had parted ways with his in-laws, and, upon being confronted by the "Tămădău Affair", decided to act as a public defender for his National Peasantist colleagues, including Ghiță Popp. He was by then unabashedly anti-Stalinist, and increasingly anti-Soviet, arguing that the "dictatorship of the proletariat", an inherently "romantic" notion of limited use, had been transformed into a justification for permanent totalitarian control. Pandrea soon produced designs for Romania's "Helvetization" within a larger bloc of Balkan states, alongside Yugoslavia and Bulgaria. This concept would have assigned a major political role to Pătrășcanu, placed on the same level as Josip Broz Tito and Georgi Dimitrov, who were national leaders of their respective countries. Pandrea, who wanted "Helvetization" doubled by a "Truce of God" between Romania's political parties, presented his plan as advantageous locally, because it could lift Romania out of her "colonial" present, and also as a service to the Soviets, since it created a buffer zone instead of an Iron Curtain.

=== First communist imprisonment ===
After 1944, Dimitrov paid several incognito visits to Pandrea's villa in Poiana Țapului. By early 1948, the sociologist had built himself a "small farm" in Periș, north of Bucharest. This location was immediately raided by the Romanian Police, who were investigating his involvement in the Tămădău disputes; they discovered and confiscated the planned book on "Helvetization". Dimitrov, who was touring Romania in his official capacity, also decided to visit him there. The two friends proceeded to discuss "Helvetization", without Pandrea being aware that Dimitrov had already approached Tito for a Bulgarian–Yugoslav integration project, which would have split apart the Eastern Bloc. As Tismăneanu reports, this saw him unwittingly dragged into an international conflict, and marked for retribution by the Soviets. At the time, the authorities had captured Nichifor Crainic, who had managed to elude arrest for his service under Antonescu. Crainic was appealing his conviction, and called on Pandrea to represent him in court—reportedly, their appeal was nearly approved by Minister Pătrășcanu, but all procedures were ended by his unexpected downfall. In a parallel trial, Pandrea was called up to defend his Meridian collaborator and godson Iliescu, who was being investigated for alleged arson at Mihai Viteazul High School. The lawyer was picked up as well, by policemen who held a gun to his head—he was amiably released after a brief interrogation.

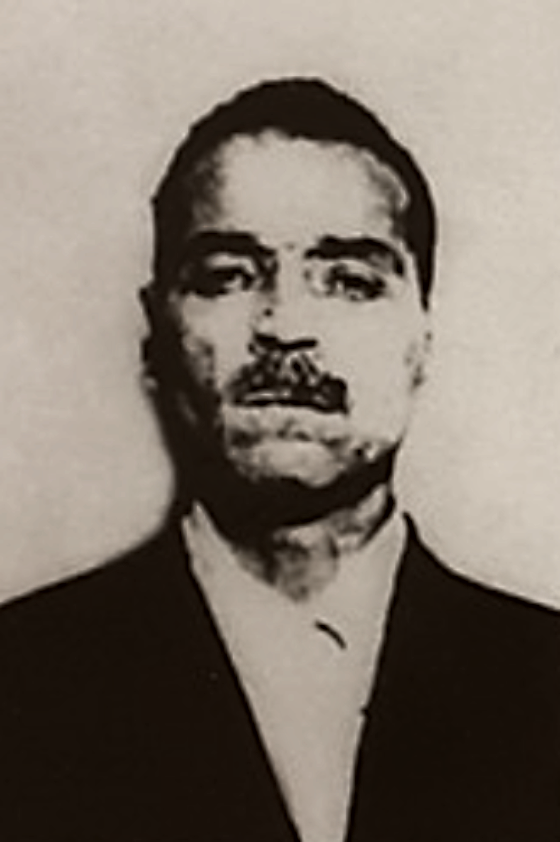
Pandrea's Securitate mugshot

Pandrea was finally arrested on 14 April; he was one of 2,400 lawyers debarred on a single day (21 April) under the pretext that they were "fascist" and "reactionary" elements. His brother-in-law, formally marginalized in February 1948, was arrested on 28 April. The interrogators at Uranus Prison, described by Pandrea as "left-wing hooligans", were the first to process his case—and reportedly did so with a long series of crude beatings. They eventually gave up on implicating Pandrea in Pătrășcanu's show trial, upon noting that the two men had parted ways after 1944. By his own account, he spent some three months moving between Malmaison and Pitești Prisons. The wardens here attempted to starve him into compliance, and also taunted him with implicit threats that he would be shot. For a short while, he was moved to Văcărești Prison, awaiting transfer together with a former Stânga colleague, the economist Titus Cristureanu. They managed to obtain food from some of Pandrea's former clients, who were held in the non-political section. On 19 July, they were taken by train to Craiova Prison.

Pandrea spent four years and seven months in jail, under circumstances described by Moisa as "dreadful". He was held at Aiud, and eventually moved to Ocnele Mari. According to Boia, he was never viewed as one of the Pătrășcanu lot: "neither he nor the ones who held him [in custody] really understood why [Pandrea] had been captured." Pandrea told other inmates that he was being punished for his passionate defense of an unnamed Guardist youth. He also claimed that he been dropped out of the Pătrășcanu trial because of Dimitrov, who had asked about his friend, even prompting the authorities to release him for a short interval. He added: "Dimitrov is dead, and there's nobody left to intervene on my behalf." Agents of the newly established Securitate soon became aware that Pandrea was serving alongside men convicted for their Iron Guard affiliation, again including Gyr, and that he was finding a common ground with them—agreeing to help them mount a "subversive activity against the people's democratic regime." His friend Țuțea, who was held in a nearby cell, once discussed with him his dream of having their captors imprisoned under a regimen similar to theirs. Pandrea himself reports that he would spend much of the day listening to Gyr's poems, which were mostly about "the horrific suffering of his people".

The former lawyer spoke of Ocnele Mari as his "underground Academy", whose overqualified members braved "constant pushes toward [their] extermination." During his time there, he claims to have annoyed the regime, and preserved inmate morale, by presenting reports on the prison conditions to "each and every insignia-wearing inspectors". He claims to have confronted one of the Securitate higher-ups about the starving rations, and to have informed one of his guards that he should resign. He also tried to help a colleague, Savel Rădulescu, who was being framed for conspiracy against the state, with advise on how to best organize his legal defense. Pandrea describes in some detail the living conditions, noting that, after months and years of malnutrition, the entire prison population struggled with vitamin deficiency, periodontal disease, and oliguria, and fed itself on linden leaves to prevent additional damage. He and Țuțea were scheduled for "re-education", witnessing the torture and public humiliation of various other inmates who care before them. They narrowly escaped this fate because the experiment was suspended, on orders from the Ministry of Internal Affairs, before the end of 1951. Pandrea recounts that he was only beaten once at Ocnele Mari, by a warden who was consequently demoted. The sociologist was still held without trial, in an "administrative punishment" regimen, until 19 November 1952, when he was simply let go. As he himself noted, this decision had something to do with the fall of from power of Ana Pauker and her associates, including Securitate supervisors such as Teohari Georgescu.

Before his release, Pandrea was recovering in the hospital ward at Văcărești, after being struck down by hepatitis and malnutrition; as he noted, none of the communists whom he had tended to the previous decades ever considered sending him "just one parcel, just one orange, just one cigarette". He was also operated on for dacryocystitis, but after his eyes had been permanently damaged. In other notes, he expressed gratitude toward Văcărești's warden, Bodnărescu, who had been his client during the years of anti-communist repression, and who felt duty-bound to "save my life". In preparation for his release, he was taken by Securitate men to Uranus, where he was again interrogated, but more politely. He could also talk back, mocking his interrogators for having "licked Ana Pauker in her cunt". The other Pandreas, including Petre's children Andrei and Nadia, had been ordered to vacate the family home in Jianu Park, moving to Pătășcanu's abandoned villa in Poiana Țapului. Andrei was left to fend for himself on the margins of society: after training as a welder, he was successively a builder, waiter, chalet-keeper, tour guide, meteorologist, cowherd, ram breeder, turner, and shepherd. His father had never seen him during the interval, and could not recognize him when they eventually reunited; in their first conversation, they discussed Andrei's clandestine attempts to finish school. When he eventually took his high-school diploma, it was as a part-time student.

=== Vladimirești affair ===
Upon his return to civilian life, Pandrea Sr lived with Eliza somewhere on the outskirts of Bucharest, in a place reachable by tram—they had moved with their large bibliophile collection into the dusky attic of a "peasant dwelling". Driven into severe poverty, they received unexpected help from the communist writer Geo Bogza, who bought them food—including an entire turkey. They were also visited by Crohmălniceanu and poet Nina Cassian, who answered to an informal announcement that Pandrea would be selling off his "pretty interesting" books. Crohmălniceanu later recounted his astonishment at seeing his colleague being unusually "nonchalant"; he himself panicked after their encounter, as he had not been aware that Eliza was the sister of a political "outcast": "No more was needed. Back then, this would've been enough to fabricate conspiracy charges [against me]." At a later date, Pandrea Sr returned to Periș, where he worked on a vineyard and survived on a 10-lei weekly salary. He was also reactivated as a translator by Biblioteca pentru toți, and in 1956 produced a version of Dimitrie Cantemir's geographical tract, Descriptio Moldaviae. Philologist Dimitrie Florea-Rariște criticized the choice, in particular since Pandrea had worked from a German version rather than from the Neo-Latin original, resulting in various errors and inconsistencies.

Pandrea was eventually, and unusually, allowed to return to the legal profession. He took pride in his subsequent activity, which involved appearing in "tens of rayon-and-region-level tribunals". Still convinced about the putrid nature of "bourgeois" laws, he invested himself in generating and fine-tuning a "people's legality". This also implied tackling the "horrible crimes against humanity" that he had witnessed as a prisoner, and that he took to be a reversible characteristic of the regime. By 1957, communist leader Gheorghe Gheorghiu-Dej had ordered a clampdown on unregulated Orthodox mystical societies and monastic fraternities. According to Pandrea himself, this offensive was callously provoked by the monk Andrei Scrima, who, from his temporary home in India, had published identifiable details on clandestine religious activities. Pandrea was subsequently involved in the legal representation for the mainstream monks of Ploscuțeni and for the unrecognized Lipovan Church. More famously, he defended the nuns of Vladimirești, appearing at consecutive trials in Adjud and Bârlad. In his private records, he alleged that the Orthodox hierarchy and the communist state were equally interested in persecuting the nuns: the bishops, encouraged by rival mystics such as Scrima and Sandu Tudor, became alarmed by heterodox practices tolerated at Vladimirești (including lactarianism, excessive Marian devotions, and public acts of confession), while the regime wished to contain the spread of popular piety. During the standoff, in 1958, Pandrea himself was religiously married to Eliza, having postponed this ceremony for two decades.

Reaching his "most productive period" in 1953, Pandrea began a set of political diaries collectively known as Călugărul alb ("White Monk"). These feature dispassionate portrayals of PCR factional leaders Gheorghiu-Dej and Pauker, as well as a moral indictment of intellectuals who now served the regime—including Ralea, analyzed therein as snake-like or "ductile". They also outline a sociological critique of the Orthodox Church, produced from somewhat anticlerical positions—focused on the self-perpetuating nepotism of the bishops, and assessing it as an in-built form of corruption. Herein, Pandrea confesses his admiration for Catholicism, seen as a paragon of chastity and obedience, but also of a "paradoxical laity" in its messaging. As noted by journalist Ionuț Iamandi, his perspective is especially noteworthy for examining "supposed defects that are independent of any political regime", rather than simply focusing on the bishops' momentary subservience to communism.

Another portion of Pandrea's manuscripts, later known as Memoriile mandarinului valah ("Memoirs of a Wallachian Mandarin"), was compiled in stages from 1954 to 1964, and had a more polemical style. He renounces objectivity to declare Ralea "scoundrel No 1", portraying him as a perennial client of political figures from across the spectrum and a sycophant of other, more illustrious, intellectuals. The work also reveals his contempt for friends such as Cassian (whom he calls "horse-faced", while commenting on her "imperialistic" sense of fashion) and Crohmălniceanu (a "small-time engineer who has been ejected into literary criticism"). He confronts news of his brother-in-law's execution with the words: "Neither his ideals nor his methods [were] to my liking. But I for one will tip off my hat, my Wallachian sheepskin cap, for any soldier that has fallen in battle." By 1955, Pandrea himself was privately rejecting all forms of socialism, writing that "no circumstances exist in which socialism would be compatible with freedom." As noted by literary critic Alex. Ștefănescu, his stance showed "almost implausible courage".

According to one of Pandrea's accounts, in early 1958 he became convinced that communism would normalize itself: he became aware of de-Stalinization, after having managed to read a copy of Ilya Ehrenburg's Thaw. His diaries recount several of his meetings with Zaharia Stancu, the interwar journalist serving as chairman of the Writers' Union. The two men clashed over issues of intellectual honesty, though Stancu also tried to warn Pandrea to tone down his anti-communist displays as a method of self-preservation: "Why would you destroy yourself? Do you want to go back in the joint, now that you're out?!" In 1958, Pandrea still felt confident enough to visit the Great National Assembly, which was presided upon by one of his interwar drinking-friends and fellow Siguranța inmate, Ion Gheorghe Maurer. The communist apparatus was however embarrassed by the Vladimirești affair, and preparing to punish the lawyer for his role in it.

=== Second communist imprisonment ===
Pandrea was rearrested by the Securitate on 23 October 1958. Upon investigation, he was found to have preserved both his camaraderie with former Guardists, including Gyr, and his personal "enmity toward the people's democratic state". The latter accusation relied on revelations from his manuscripts, which had been confiscated and stored by the Securitate; the prosecutors found these to contain "crude and spiteful calumnies about the life and activity of state and party leaders". He himself reports that his dossier, though officially depicting him as a dangerous "agitator", was primarily focused on his activity at the bar. He recalls telling his judge: "A writer's manuscripts and intimate diary cannot be used as the object of any trial." Pandrea also claims that his defense team, comprising his brother Minel and a nephew, was prevented from attending court sessions. On 15 June 1959, he was sentenced to a 15-years term of penal servitude. Andrei, who was studying at the Bucharest Faculty of Medicine, was expelled, but reintegrated when Tudor Vianu intervened on his behalf. He was eventually allowed to work as a country doctor in Boișoara. This experience informed his own writings, some of which were anthropological studies of social life in Țara Loviștei.

Petre Pandrea was moved to Jilava Prison in mid-1959, and, by his own account, was again beaten up, in a variety of ways and for no discernible reason. He was sent back to Aiud on 23 October, and consequently chanced upon many of his fellow inmates from 1948–1952. Though presented with an opportunity to share his cell with Țuțea, he preferred solitary confinement, because "I will let no man control me, or dictate his thoughts to me." As an experienced prisoner, he was able to endure the starvation regimen, which drove some of his colleagues to eat leftovers, some out of a trough that a guard was using to feed his pigs. Pandrea claims that, upon witnessing this moral degradation, he embraced a nothing by mouth style of fasting during each Friday. He experienced hunger pangs throughout the day, continuously so from 1959 to 1962. He later wrote about these as a special form of gastritis, but argued that the diet had its advantages, since it induced deep restful sleep in the victim. When he was eventually "crushed" into collaborating with his captors, it was not because of hunger, but rather because of his overwhelming desire to produce literature, and his recurring bouts of existential dread (the "purple hour" of hallucinatory despair). Aware that he was again bonding with Guardist inmates over creating a catch-all "Movement of Resistance", the Securitate placed him under constant surveillance, starting in February 1961; his file recorded his name as "Marcu Petre Pandrea".

Beginning that year, he was caught up in another re-education experiment. Unlike the earlier attempts in Pitești and Ocnele Mari, it was largely non-violent, with positive reinforcement, such as full rations, being awarded to those who confessed their past transgressions. As noted by researcher Ruxandra Cesereanu, Pandrea's claim that, at Aiud, such practices where wholly benign samples of "communist humanism" reflects either his left-wing biases or his attempt to "dupe his re-educators". In such vetted diaries, Pandrea argues that the "counter-revolution" in Hungary, with its string of "atrocities", had shown that the violence of early communism could only generate more violence: "Man does not improve himself with a bludgeon." As proof of his own willingness to change, he joined Dumitru Stăniloae on a tour of Aiud's prison cells, where they heard self-denunciations by other inmates, and gave readings from the works of Anton Makarenko. At around that time (possibly in April 1961), Pandrea witnessed the death of a fellow inmate, George Manu, who had presided upon a moderate but uncooperative faction of the Iron Guard. In his later records of the event, he claims that Manu died in the prison hospital, under banal circumstances. His account was challenged by several other inmates, who contrarily reported that Manu had been passively euthanized by prison guards after having refused to undergo re-education. In late 1962, he and Stăniloae heard confessions from an Iron-Guard bookkeeper, Petre Țocu, who exposed the Guard's secret business dealings with Carol II's camarilla, including Ion Gigurtu and Ernest Urdăreanu.

In 1963, the authorities moved Pandrea himself into the hospital section (one that he himself called a "leper colony"). While there, he underwent an operation to cure a hernia. He managed to obtain access to writing tools, and began work on an autobiographical novel, called Tragedia de la Mărgăritești ("A Tragedy in Mărgăritești"), totaling some 200 pages in its manuscript. Warden Gheorghe Crăciun wanted him and another inmate, Valeriu Anania, to act as his "scribes" for the Aiud white papers, presenting a self-congratulatory overview of the prison experiment. In addition to covering the supposedly harmless events in his re-education, such pages show Pandrea turning against the Iron Guard. A rival inmate, Gheorghe Andreica, opined that he was encouraged by the Securitate to write down his "paltry stuff" for "one more spoonful of barley in his flask", though his verdict is disputed by historian Silviu B. Moldovan (who rather sees Pandrea as a sincere anti-fascist, if indeed one "usable by the communist regime"). Another historian, Filip-Lucian Iorga, believes that the text should be approached with "extreme caution", but also that it provides some valuable hints about the cruelty of re-education at Pitești. Some fragments still feature Pandrea's thoughts on communism as morally bankrupt, suggesting that its localized avatar was salvageable only because of an atavistic quality, "that old Romanian humaneness". Within the context of re-education, he declared de-Stalinization as restoring a moral advantage of the communist countries; he veered into anti-Western sentiment, since "the Occident has abandoned [...] its vitality, and moreover its healthiness."

=== Amnesty and return ===
Pandrea was only released in spring 1964, after a general amnesty of all political prisoners, and had arrived at Poiana Țapului by 1 June. During his two terms behind bars, he had been moved between fourteen prison facilities. As early as October 1964, he asked the Securitate for permission to obtain and publish his prison notebooks. The answer was wholly negative, "since it would create a precedent whereby we publish [...] aspects that need not be popularized". He was however granted a small state pension, and progressively allowed to reconnect with his peers in the literary world. He was accepted as an outside contributor by the Romanian Academy, and welcomed with sympathy at the Writers' Union restaurant in Bucharest—though he initially preferred not to eat there, fearing that it was too expensive. His recovery was sped up when Ramuri magazine, published in Craiova by Ilie Purcaru and other young intellectuals, invited him to join the circle of contributors—mainly with short essays on Brâncuși's life and art. Eugen Barbu, who was putting out Luceafărul in Bucharest, recalls being visited by "Petre Pandrea, morally exhausted by some great injustice and seeking typographic space for reuniting himself with a public that had just about forgotten him". From 1965 to his death, he was also affiliated with another regional magazine, Oltul.

The Securitate reopened its file on Pandrea after his repeated attempts to publish a Brâncuși monograph somewhere in the Western Bloc, since he had sought to obtain backing from intellectually prestigious exiles such as Mircea Eliade and Emil Cioran. Following Gheorghiu-Dej's death, a young PCR activist, Nicolae Ceaușescu, took over as Romania's political leader. This takeover was decisively facilitated by Maurer, whom Pandrea once identified as having all the virile qualities required of a Romanian "Lenin". In the new political climate of 1965–1966, Pandrea was trying but failing to convince the central magazines of Bucharest to republish some of his interwar articles, and also raised negative attention in Securitate ranks by asking Editura Militară to help him recover his stolen manuscripts. He had called upon Maurer, the acting Romanian Premier, to settle that issue—however, his case agents were lenient, describing this as the action of a "misfit"; they sent their own letter to Maurer, advising him not to press the matter. Pandrea's attempts to expand his circle were closely monitored by the secret police, which now violated his correspondence with figures such as Eugène Ionesco, Ionel Jianu, and Alexandru A. Philippide. In September 1965, the Securitate formally warned him to give up on the manuscripts issue, whose "inimical nature" meant that they could never be printed.

Pandrea was living at 96 Sandu Aldea Street, in northern Bucharest, but vacationing with his daughter at Poiana Țapului and in Periș. Purcaru reports on Pandrea's presence at Ramuri's informal salon in Craiova, where he entertained his colleagues with opinions on a wide range of subjects—variously including Milarepa, Schopenhauer's aesthetics, and the folk ballad Miorița. In early 1967, he attended one such party alongside archeologist Constantin S. Nicolăescu-Plopșor and art critic Vasile Georgescu Paleolog. Also then, he met the philologist Stelian Cincă, who was preparing a paper on Gib Mihăescu. This gave Pandrea a chance to reminisce about his deceased friend at Gândirea. Urged on by Cincă and the fledgling University of Craiova, he then began preparing a monograph on that writer. During their exchanges, he expressed a desire to move back to Oltenia, where his nieces and nephews were still residing.

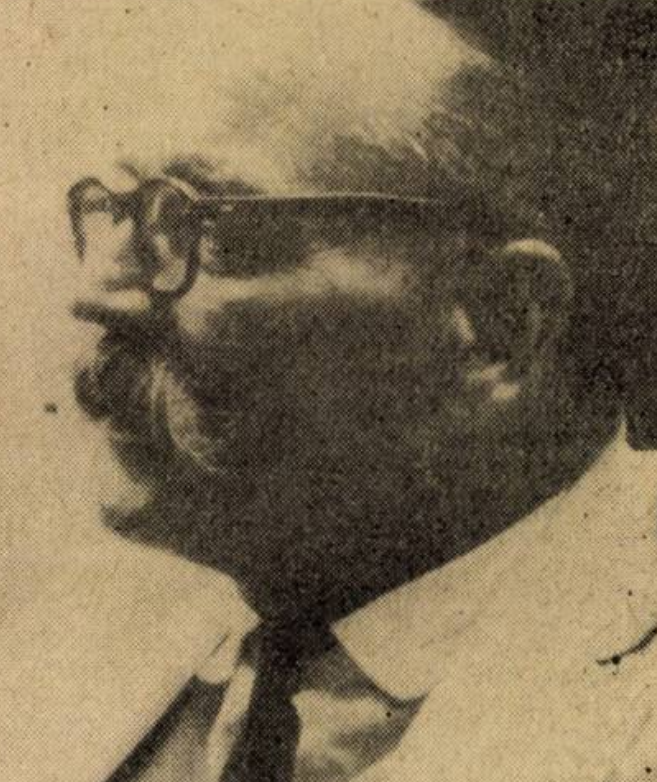
Pandrea, pictured shortly after his final release from prison

A final Padrea book, largely based on his Brâncuși essays for Ramuri, came out at Editura Meridiane of Bucharest in 1967. Art historian Andrei Pleșu, who regarded the work as "charmingly bombastic" and sometimes self-contradictory, inferred that it was printed "before its author could give it a final polish." Much of the text dwells on Brâncuși's supposed intellectual debt to Romanian folklore, and to modern literary figures such as Mihai Eminescu, but also comprises musings about his uniqueness on the world stage, his ultimate universality. This double nature is illustrated with ample quotes from the artist's table talk and his private tastes, down to his enjoyment of Sudanese music. According to Simion, his core argument, namely that Brâncuși was an authentic Westernizer and modernist precisely for being a "localist", was Pandrea's own self-defense; Simion finds the book "delectable, for all its Bogomilist vision." It was intended as part of a (never completed) series, one volume of which would have dealt with Brâncuși's detractors. Art historian Petru Comarnescu was dismissive of the monograph: "shamefully superficial", "it quotes Brâncuși with things that he could never have said", and relies on testimonials by the Romanian American writer Peter Neagoe (whom Comarnescu describes as unreliable). Comarnescu also reports the existence of an unedited, larger manuscript, which had been rejected by the communist censors—justly so, according to Comarnescu, since it had only excelled in "infantile sociology" and "Oltenian chauvinism".

Upon returning to life on the outside, Pandrea had concentrated on his hidden memoirs, an "unclassifiable literary object" exclusively designed to be read by future generations. In one fragment, he describes himself as a political failure and a witness to the realities of power, pleading to be seen as a Romanian Cardinal de Retz or Saint-Simon. The notebooks only preserve faint traces of his Marxist past, generally focused on his repeated attempts to clean up Pătrășcanu's posthumous image. As part of this effort, Pandrea shifts blame for his brother-in-law's criminal faults toward his entourage—his wife Elena-Hertha, his friends Belu Zilber and Herant Torosian. Sometimes harsh toward Pătrășcanu himself, he portrays him overall as an "eminently modern man", whose ending at the hands of his enemies had made him into a "Prometheus". While he repeatedly dismisses claims that Pătrășcanu was ever an informant for the Siguranța, he also cautions against his posthumous image as a national-communist: "The allegations that he was a renegade, converted to xenophobic nationalism, can only be regarded as idiocies. This type of a man only have demanded, and will continue to demand, an improvement on the revolution, without messing about with its fundamental doctrines."

Pandrea's retrospective vision of communism between Pătrășcanu's fall and Ceaușescu's ascent places focus on a backstage figure, Iosif Chișinevschi, whom he describes as Romania's "Iron Chancellor". In order to explain Chișinevschi's supposed sway over local politics, he credits a (since debunked) rumor that his protagonist was an in-law of Lazar Kaganovich, the Soviet Deputy Premier. He is instead genuinely lenient toward some of the PCR leadership, as well as toward allies of communism—especially including Tudor Arghezi, whom Pandrea continued to love, and Isac Ludo, whom he admired for his comedic take on interwar history. The texts also express some sympathy toward Gheorghiu-Dej, seen as preferable to the more Soviet-aligned faction that Dej had purged from the party. These fragments, Voinescu asserts, are disconcerting. They "only show us how tragic things became for the writer, within his demonetized environment." Overall, Tismăneanu observes,

Pandrea rarely even deals with Dej and with Dej's coterie. This may perhaps be explained through his own intellectual fixation: he simply could not believe that the system could even operate from decisions taken by illiterate men, by marginal figures propelled at the very tip of a pyramid through a historic accident, namely Romania's occupation by the Red Army.

=== Illness and death ===
As early as 1955, Pandrea was being drawn back into the Church, writing that had been born as an Orthodox, and intended to die as one. His motivations were secular, since he felt bound by a "communion of love and destiny" with the other Orthodox Romanians, adding: "I could just as well be an atheist, but that seems too crass, too cheap, and inexact as a theory of knowledge." In his Aiud manuscripts, he reiterated his fundamental non-belief, confessing that he could only see the Bible as "Mosaic folklore". He was meanwhile turning to full-blown conservatism, consciously modeled on 19th-century Junimism; as noted by Stanomir, his manuscript memoirs fold back on anti-rationalism, reconnecting Pandrea with his first-ever mentor, Nae Ionescu. However, as Simion observes, he also remained committed to his peasant-inspired vision of "social justice", while expanding on his localist vision (to the point of declaring himself "not a Romanian, but an Oltenian and a European"). Stanomir also believes that Pandrea's attitude on life was occasionally similar to that of another prisoner turned clandestine diarist, Nicolae Steinhardt. While Steinhardt took monastic orders, Pandrea approximated an "atypical sainthood", centered on the constant affirmation of truth.

The aged writer privately confessed that he wished to burn down on a public pyre all of his "juridical and philosophical works", and that he would have gladly burned them down himself "were it not for my fear of ostentation and of policemen." In his last four years, he had entered a correspondence with Crohmălniceanu. It included "painful reflections" on his discarding the legal profession at the age of 60. Pandrea declared himself irreconcilable with the new justice-system, which drove lawyers into a "fraternization with the prosecutors", allowing them to plead against their own clients. An enclosed photograph showed "signs of his exhaustion and foreseeable demise", his mouth contorted into an "evidently bitter" grimace. Pandrea's other writings reveal that his health had been "utterly ruined" during his previous confinement. Writer Ioana Diaconescu, who covered Pandrea's Securitate files in a 2007 article, believes that his physical decline was only enhanced by ongoing oppression and frustration in the post-1964 era. During his stay at Aiud, he had first considered the prospect of dying somewhere near Bucharest, in what he mockingly termed the "Ilfovian State". He made his children promise that they would only bury him in "my tiny homeland" of Oltenia. He made a return trip to Craiova in November 1967, but only managed to meet Nicolăescu-Plopșor.

The philosopher was ultimately brought down by a "ruthless disease, topping the torrent of sorrows that had plagued him during his final two decades"; Comarnescu reveals this to have been an "amazingly fast" developing cancer, and notes that a "premonition of death" had seeped into Pandrea's final essays. Elsewhere, he was optimistic: in April 1968, he announced in Ramuri that he was working on a historical biography of Radu Șapcă (who had participated in the Wallachian Revolution of 1848). In the final days of May, Pandrea was interned for surgery at Elias Hospital. He was impressed at having read a chronicle of his work, penned by M. N. Rusu, and noted that the medical staff had read it as well, and that he now seemed to them a more important patient. One of his final letters was addressed to Eliade, confessing to him his undying admiration, and expressing sympathy with him—at a time when Eliade's fascist past was being re-investigated. Pandrea described this inquiry as a form of character assassination, mounted by "some yokels and decommissioned Jews, angry that they haven't managed to kill you [...] at the opportune moment." Another letter, sent to his intimate circle, asked that a well be dug up near his favorite fig tree, and ended with the salute: "Goodnight to you, well-sinkers!"

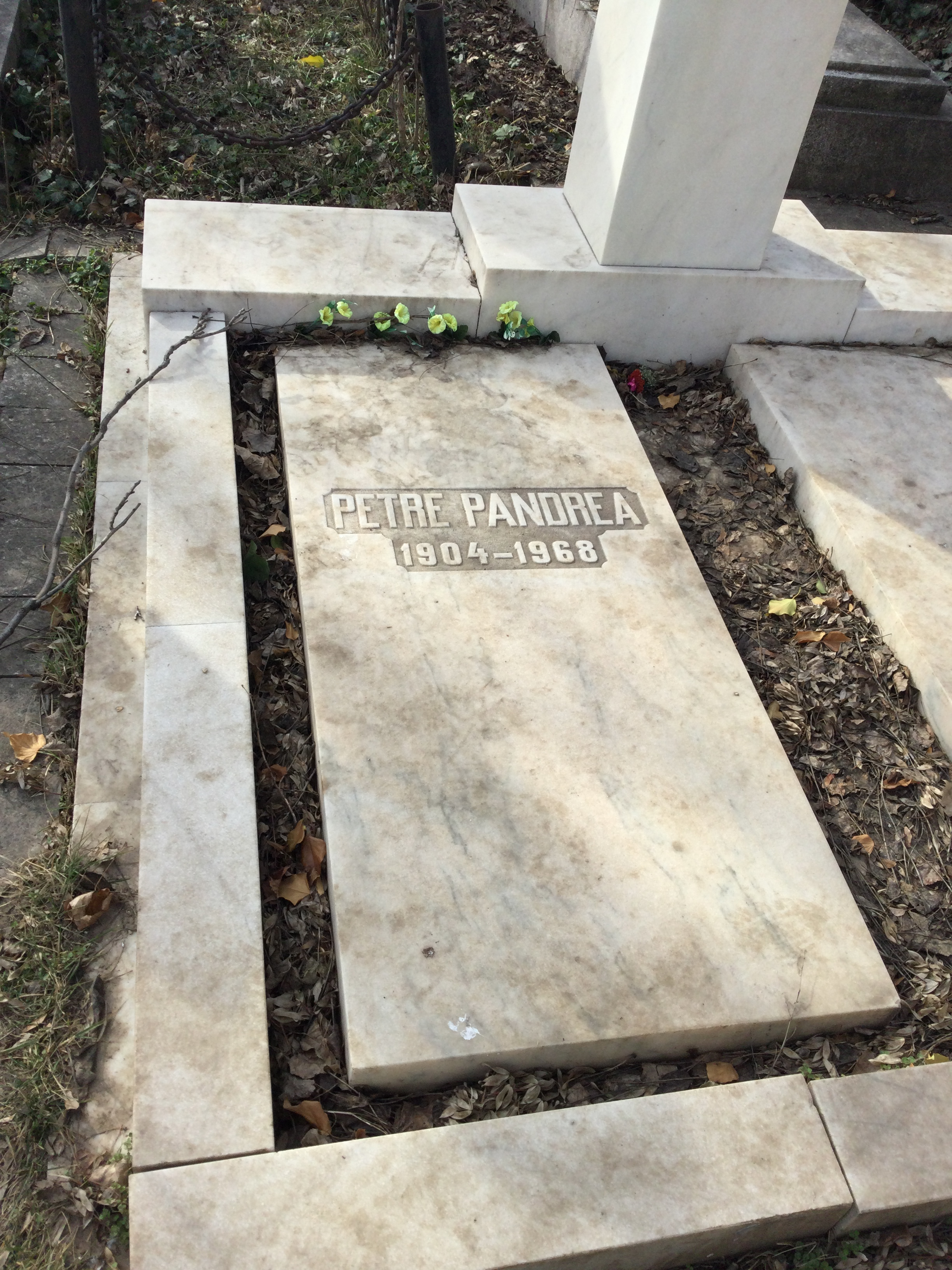
Pandrea's tomb in Bellu cemetery

Pandrea died in Bucharest on 8 July 1968, shortly after having turned 64. The Writers' Union announced this loss of a "distinguished intellectual [and] writer of impressive originality" in an obituary for Scînteia, the PCR's national tribune. He was laid in state at the Union on 10 July, and Comarnescu delivered there his final oration. Virgil Carianopol, who showed up to pay his respects, recalls that the body was coal-black. The dying Pandrea had sent Rusu one of his final manuscripts, which was a sentimental record of his encounters with Garabet Ibrăileanu. As recounted by Alex. Ștefănescu (at the time a 21-year-old student), his "immense and tumultuous" contribution was largely unknown to the younger generations: "Had we known [about him], we would have descended in droves at his funeral". That ceremony took place at Bellu cemetery on the evening of 10 July.

== Legacy ==
=== Communist rehabilitation ===
In late 1968, Ceaușescu and the PCR's permanent presidium issued a resolution that posthumously rehabilitated "Marcu Petre Pandrea", noting that the testimonies against him had been collected from unreliable witnesses, including members of the Iron Guard, and that some of them had since recanted. This came shortly after the Supreme Tribunal had admitted his appeal, clearing him of all charges of "conspiracy against the social order". The decision to publish these findings in the communist press was debated in the central committee: Gheorghe Stoica proposed that they be ignored, "since he is dead by now", whereas others, including Alexandru Bârlădeanu, asked for Pandrea's rehabilitation to be advertised nationally, as a favor to his wife and children. Essayist Dan Ciachir, whose mother befriended Eliza Pandrea in the 1960s, recalls that the latter was indifferent to the rehabilitation afforded to both her brother and husband, as well as, more generally, to the "relaxation" introduced by Ceaușescu. Being "hyper-intelligent", she had come to reject both communism and Marxism.

Posthumous homages included a May 1969 article by poet Nichita Stănescu, who confessed still feeling in awe of "the old man", and conjuring mentally his authoritative presence, as a guide, whenever he felt unsure of himself. In September of that year, Ramuri hosted a fragment from Pandrea's unfinished historical novel about the hajduk Iancu Jianu. The regime tolerated other public tributes, such as the establishment in Balș of a "Petre Pandrea Literary Society", which put out a typewritten magazine. In 1971, Gheorghe Stroia republished at Editura Minerva the full corpus of Pandrea's interwar essays, with a preface by George Ivașcu. Also that year, the official Marxist scholar Miron Constantinescu, whom Pandrea had regarded as an uneducated tool of Pauker's "genocidal" faction, published an overview of recoverable sociology. This text praised Pandrea as one of the earliest Marxist luminaries in the field, alongside Alexandru Claudian, Anton Golopenția, and Henri H. Stahl.

In 1976, Eugen Barbu issued a war-themed novel, Incognito, which features a thinly disguised portrayal of Pandrea, as "Pavel Candrea", and also integrates large fragments of his political prose. Crohmălniceanu's short memoir of his encounters with Pandrea was put out by România Literară in July 1978. Honoring Pandrea as an "anti-dogmatist" who had been sincerely won over by the "superiority of dialectical thought", it also briefly mentioned his "two stints in prison" under communism. In a provided excerpt from their correspondence, Pandrea, referring to himself in the third person, still declared his support for "humanistic communism", and his soldiering on under "the banner of Marxism-Leninism." In his 1981 piece, Ornea asserted that, in posterity, his friend still elicited suspicions: like many of their interwar predecessors, the "distinguished critics" of that age still refused to see Pandrea as a genuine leftist, and "examine [his essays] mostly through the image he projected before and during 1928. That is profoundly unfair and untrue."

An audio recording of Pandrea reading from his Brâncuși-themed book had been aired by the Romanian Radio Broadcasting Company in July 1979. A new edition of Pandrea's essays was curated by Gheorghe Epure and came out in 1982—but was criticized by Ungureanu for omitting two works by "one of the most original Romanian writers", who should be read "without interruption". In May 1982, Ramuri hosted another fragment of his historical fiction, which may have been an independent part of his planned Jianu work. Another missing piece from the writer's archives was revealed in 1984, when Manuscriptum hosted his essay on Horea, leader of a 1784 peasants' revolt in Transylvania. Here, Pandrea discussed peasant unrest as the radical avatar of Josephinism, hypothesizing links between Horea and the Freemasonry.

At the time of his father's death, Andrei Pandrea was a lecturer of literary history at Ștefan Gheorghiu Academy and an adviser on rural medicine for the Romanian Ministry of Health. His books were refused by several publishing houses, which had continued to publish his father's works. This apparent injustice was commented on by poet Adrian Păunescu, who suggested that the contracts needed to be renegotiated, leaving the offending managers without access to the "unforgettable Petre Pandrea." Pandrea Jr left on an extended study trip to France in 1973, and continued to publish various scientific papers, as well as novels. In 1979 he demanded and obtained political asylum; this caused him to be tried in absentia by a Bucharest court, which sentenced him to a seven-years' prison term. He was joined in Paris by his elderly mother (who spent her final years in that city), and also (from 1988) by his sister.

=== Post-censorship ===
Andrei Pandrea only made brief returns to Romania after the Romanian Revolution of 1989, when the peasants of Boișoara voted to award him a plot of land. By December 1990, the two Pandrea children were fighting each other over the Pătrășcanu–Pandrea villa in Poiana Țapului: Nadia reportedly sold the home to a friend, so that Andrei could not claim it, but later came to regret the decision, and sued the buyer. The new political circumstances allowed for a complete investigation of Pandrea Sr as an anti-communist thinker. Upon the thirtieth commemoration of his death in 1998, Moisa referred to him as "one of the greatest consciousnesses of this century, in all of Europe", "inscribed along the coordinates of the greatest humanism and rationalism". He drew a comparison between Pandrea and another writer of the Ramuri circle and former political prisoner, Ion Dezideriu Sîrbu, viewing both of them as irrepressible independents, "in any political context and against all baleful odds." Also then, Moisa introduced a fragment of Tragedia de la Mărgăritești, noting that many other of the manuscript pages were "nearly illegible, due to conditions under which they were written".

Work on recovering and editing Pandrea's other manuscripts was mostly done by Nadia Marcu. In 2000, the Romanian Intelligence Service, which had inherited the Securitate archives, granted Pandrea's secretary and godson, the octogenarian Costi Rătescu, full ownership of the raw texts. Rătescu passed these on to Marcu. Memoriile mandarinului valah first appeared at Editura Albatros, later that same year. In reviewing the text in 2001, Ungureanu observed that "all of his prophecies have come true", and declared himself amazed by his exposure of the state's "best-guarded secrets". In 2001, Memoriile were legitimized as a primary source of information in Marian Popa's Hand-to-Mouth History of Romanian Literature, which was otherwise criticized for endorsing some of the far-right's cultural perspectives—in his defense of Popa's work, essayist Vasile Andru noted that the very reverence shown to Pandrea should have invalidated accusations of neo-fascism.

The recovery project was soon after embraced by Editura Vremea, which inaugurated a Pandrea series—with topical volumes detailing Pandrea's take on re-education experiments (2000), as well as his ideas about the Iron Guard, and, separately, his essays on "Helvetization" (both compiled in 2001). Călugărul alb appeared as part of this collection in 2003 (and was reissued by the same company in 2020). The scientific and literary communities repeatedly highlighted the memoirs' importance, though some controversy surrounded Nadia's decision to include texts that her father had apparently not intended for publishing (in particular his subdued accounts of re-education). Tismăneanu spoke of Memoriile mandarinului as having a "subjective, perhaps even neurotic" tone, but also an "overwhelming significance" for the study of power in Sovietized Romania. The series was seen by critic Ion Simuț as "lack[ing] literary originality", but compensating for this fault with its "documentary authenticity", evidencing the existence in Romania of a "noble breed that has resisted communism". Ștefănescu recommended their sampling in literary textbooks, suggesting that such an effort could help curb the spread of "leftist ideas" among Romanian youths. He added:

Petre Pandrea's spiritual freedom is shocking even today, when we no longer live under the ideological terror that was communism. Prejudices, taboos, unwritten rules of snobbery—nothing of what falsifies thought is ever respected by this writer. [...] Once it will become known and integrated, we may finally get to understand how much an oeuvre of this kind has been longed for in Romanian culture.

Following efforts by Ion Lazu, in October 2007 a memorial plaque was placed on Pandrea's first home in Bucharest. In Balș, where his daughter continued to reside in the 2010s, a high school was named in his honor, and a bust in his likeness was unveiled in 2013. On 5 November of that year, he was posthumously elected a member of the Romanian Academy, alongside Vladimir Ghika. The Pandreas were at the time involved in a legal dispute with Prime Minister Victor Ponta, whose family had obtained ownership of the Poiana Țapului villa. In 2004, the Greater Romania Party's Corneliu Vadim Tudor, claiming to speak on Nadia's behalf, accused Ponta's mother and sister of fraud in regard to this affair. Polemics also surrounded the memoirs themselves: in a 2016 overview, scholar Ștefan Dimitriu, who had worked with Nadia Marcu, suggested that the cultural mainstream had returned to a position where it casually ignored this "literary revelation". This verdict was supported by literary critic Sorin Lavric, who argued that Pandrea had ultimately managed to "irritate" the modern intellectuals.
