= Grohotișul River =

Grohotișul River may refer to:

- Grohotișul, a name for the upper course of the river Turcu in Brașov County
- Grohotișul River (Boia Mare)
