= Youssef Tohme =

Lebanese-French architect and urban planner

- يوسف طعمة
- Tohme in Bordeaux, 2018
- Born: 1969 (age 56–57); Beirut, Lebanon
- Alma mater: Paris-Villemin School of Architecture
- Occupations: Architect, urban planner
- Awards: Medal of urbanism, Academy of Architecture of France (2015)
- Practice: Youssef Tohme Architects and Associates (YTAA)

Youssef Tohme (Arabic: يوسف طعمة; born 1969) is a Lebanese-French architect and urban planner. Born in Beirut, he studied at the Paris-Villemin School of Architecture, where he later taught architectural theory. Between 2000 and 2006, he worked in architecture practices in Paris, including Ateliers Jean Nouvel, before returning to Lebanon. In 2008, he founded Youssef Tohme Architects and Associates (YTAA) in Beirut with Roger Akoury. The practice has undertaken architectural and urban-planning projects in Lebanon, France, Romania, and other countries.

== Career ==
Projects associated with Tohme and YTAA include the Brazza Nord development in Bordeaux, the Campus of Innovation, Economy and Sport at Saint Joseph University in Beirut, the residential development on the Île de Nantes, the Bruneseau project in Paris and Ivry-sur-Seine, the MARe – Museum of Recent Art in Bucharest, the Cambridge School in Romania, the Îlot sur le Parc / Les Échelles project in Marseille, the A599 Residential Building in Achrafieh, the BLF Disaster Center in Ghazir, Kalani Beach in Halat, and several private residences.

== Urban-scale projects ==
In 2012, YTAA won an international urban-planning competition organized by the City of Bordeaux for the redevelopment of the Brazza Nord district. The project involved the transformation of approximately 60 hectares of former industrial land into a mixed-use urban area. The proposal addressed the relationship between housing, landscape, and the existing urban context.

The project included large loggias, terraces, elevated pilotis, and buildings located among existing trees. Landscape was incorporated into the organization of the district and its public spaces.

The Brazza project also introduced the concept of "volumes capables", in which residential units can be expanded by their occupants over time. Within a regulated building height of five meters, residents can develop additional areas of their homes according to their needs and resources.

In 2016, YTAA was selected to design a residential development on the Île de Nantes. Known as La Canopée, the project includes 120 housing units and an eleven-story wood-frame tower. The development incorporates large terraces that extend the residential spaces and provide outdoor areas associated with the apartments.

== Competitions and development ==
In 2019, YTAA was part of the Nouvel R consortium, which won the competition for the Bruneseau project. Located between Paris and Ivry-sur-Seine, the project addresses an area divided by major transport infrastructure, including the périphérique. The proposed development sought to establish connections between Paris and Ivry-sur-Seine through new buildings and public spaces.

The masterplan includes a major axis extending Avenue de France toward Ivry-sur-Seine and combines buildings of different heights. YTAA's contribution includes a 180-metre residential tower. The apartments incorporate adaptable kitchen areas and intermediate spaces that can function as loggias, providing flexibility in the use of the dwellings.

In 2019, YTAA also won the competition for Îlot sur le Parc in Marseille. The project forms part of the final phase of the Euroméditerranée urban-regeneration programme and is located near the Saint-Charles station and the Porte d’Aix. The proposal includes a mixed-use development organized around an open courtyard. The courtyard is intended to provide a shared open space within the development and connect the project with the surrounding neighborhood.

== Architectural practice ==
The Campus of Innovation, Economy and Sport at Saint Joseph University in Beirut was designed by Tohme in collaboration with 109 Architectes. The campus combines academic, sports, and public facilities within a compact site. Its organization includes a central court and a large staircase that connects different parts of the campus.

The project accommodates approximately 60,000 m² of usable academic, sports, and public facilities on a site with a footprint of approximately 6,000 m².

The MARe – Museum of Recent Art in Bucharest was completed in 2018. The museum incorporates a reconstruction of the form of a 1939 villa on the site, expressed as a dark concrete volume above a glazed ground floor. The original villa's form was reproduced as part of the new building, while the ground floor provides a transparent connection between the museum and the surrounding street.

The Cambridge School in Romania was built on a site containing existing buildings dating from the communist period and an existing landscape. The project incorporated the existing buildings and landscape into the school campus. The campus is located adjacent to a forest and includes landscaped areas used as part of the school environment.

The A599 Residential Building in Achrafieh, Beirut, occupies a triangular site at the intersection of two streets. Its structural system is positioned around the perimeter of the building, allowing the interior floor plates to be configured in different ways. The building contains different residential configurations, including single-floor units, duplexes, and penthouses.

=== Houses ===
The T House is located in Kornet Chehouane on a steep site overlooking Beirut and the Mediterranean. The house consists of three concrete planes arranged vertically on the slope and connected by an internal ramp. The design incorporates the existing topography and vegetation into the organization of the house.

The SC House is located in Akoura at an altitude of approximately 1,200 metres and is situated on the edge of a cliff overlooking the surrounding mountains. The house is organized around a central patio, with the principal open façade oriented toward the surrounding landscape.

== Awards ==
In 2015, Tohme received the Medal of Urbanism from the Academy of Architecture of France for his work in Bordeaux. In January 2018, he was admitted as a member of the Académie française d'architecture.

== Public engagements and publications ==
In 2013, Tohme was appointed curator of the 2014 edition of Agora, a biennial architecture, urbanism, and design event held in Bordeaux. The edition addressed public space and the relationship between architecture and urban life.

Tohme published Intensive Beirut, a study of the urban development and architecture of Beirut. The publication examines issues including density, coexistence, informality, resilience, and the development of the city.

Tohme's work has been featured in international architecture publications including Domus, ArchDaily, Bauwelt, d’architectures, and Le Monde. In March 2022, he published Intimacies, a monograph written by architect and critic Karine Dana in collaboration with Sebastian Redecke. The book presents projects by YTAA in Beirut, Bucharest, Bordeaux, Marseille, and Paris and discusses their architectural development and design processes.

Tohme has also participated in lectures and public discussions on architecture in several countries.
