= Suru River =

Suru River may refer to:

- Suru River (Indus), a tributary of the Indus River in India
- Suru, a tributary of the river Boia Mică in Romania
