= Andrei Cădere =

Romanian conceptual artist (1934–1978)

André Cadere
- Andrei Cădere
- Born: May 30, 1934; Warsaw, Poland
- Died: August 12, 1978 (aged 44); Paris, France
- Notable work: Barres de bois rond
- Movement: Conceptual art

André Cadere (Andrei Cădere) was a Romanian conceptual artist, known for his influential work in the world of contemporary art.

== Biography ==
André Cadere was born on May 30, 1934, in Warsaw, Poland, where his father served as a diplomat. He moved to Paris, France, in 1967. During the same year, he exhibited his paintings, which were influenced by OP Art, at the Experimental Art Market. Cadere is associated with Isidore Isou and the Lettrist movement. He quickly connected with Parisian artists who explored the boundaries of authorship, artwork identity, and the significance of signatures and objects within minimal art, Land Art, and conceptual art.

In 1969, André Cadere exhibited a relief painting made of half-colored sticks at the Salon de Mai. He also participated in "Work in Progress," an exhibition organized by Christian Boltanski and Jean Le Gac, during which he wove 750 meters of string onto the portal of the American Center.

He was known for his Barres de bois rond (Round Wooden Bars, 1970–78), which were wood poles made of colored segments. He would carry these bars around with him, showing them in public and installing them in art exhibitions without invitation. Cadere died of cancer in Paris in 1978.

== Exhibitions ==
One of Cadere's notable exhibitions was held at the Institute for Contemporary Art, PS1, in New York, titled "André Cadere, All Walk of Life," from October 15 to December 10, 1989.

Some of his artwork is exhibited in the Museum of Recent Art in Bucharest.

Cadere participated in the group exhibition MOVING 1977, which was featured at Hal Bromm Gallery in Tribeca, New York City in 1977.

In November 1978, Hal Bromm Gallery held an exhibition in memoriam for Cadere, who died prior to the planned exhibition opening.
