= Primăverii Palace =

- Palatul Primăverii
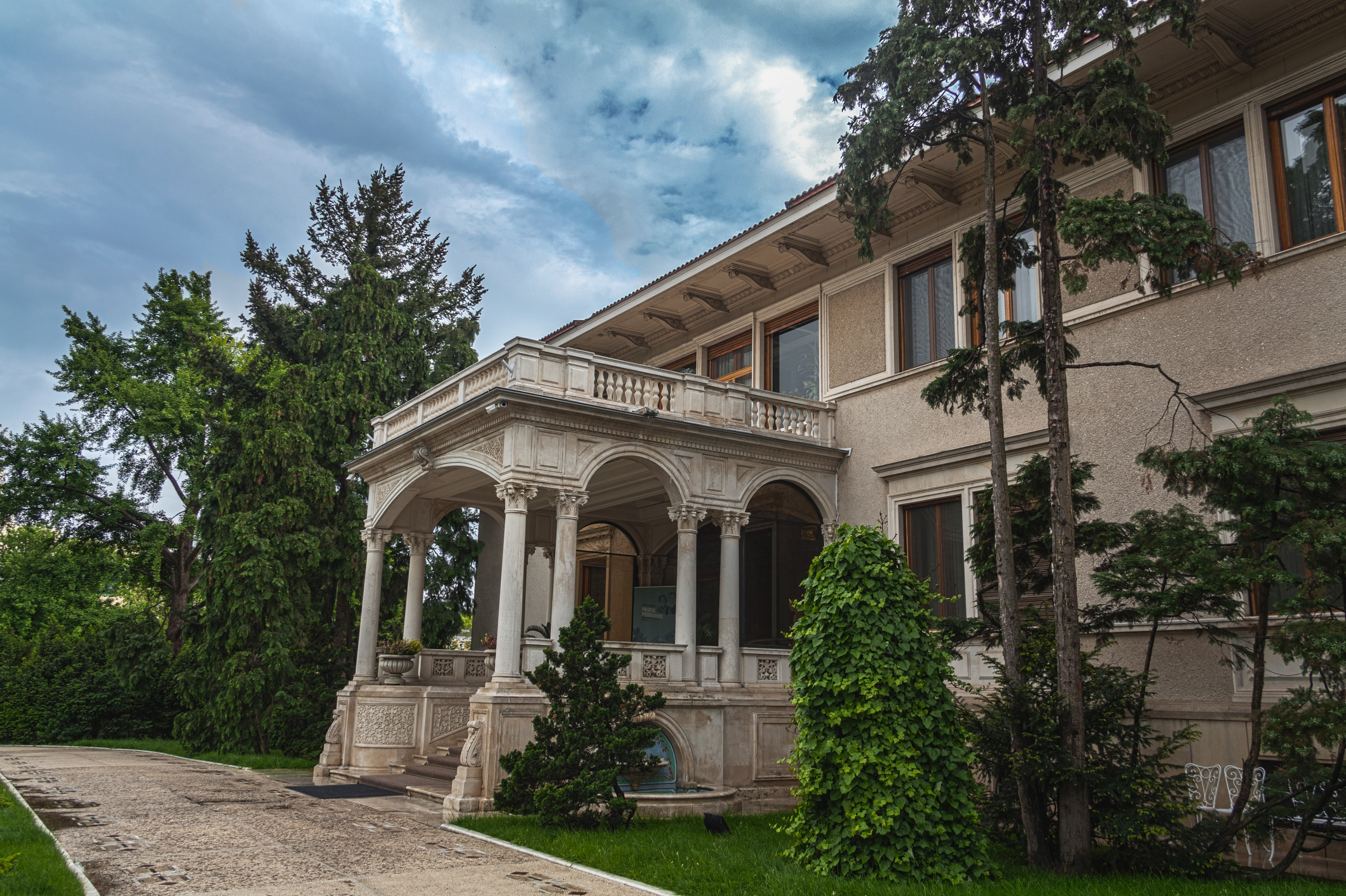
- Interactive map of the Primăverii Palace area
- Alternative names: Casa Ceaușescu

General information
- Location: Primăverii, Bucharest, Romania
- Coordinates: 44.46917°N 26.09241°E
- Year built: 1964-65

Primăverii Palace (Romanian: Palatul Primăverii), also known as Casa Ceaușescu, is a building in Bucharest, Romania, located in the Primăverii district of the city. Since 2016 it has housed a museum.

== History ==
The building was built between 1964-1965 as a residence for Gheorghe Gheorghiu-Dej.

After the Romanian revolution in December 1989, the palace was used as a protocol villa for official delegations from Romania and abroad. In 2016, the palace was transformed into a museum.

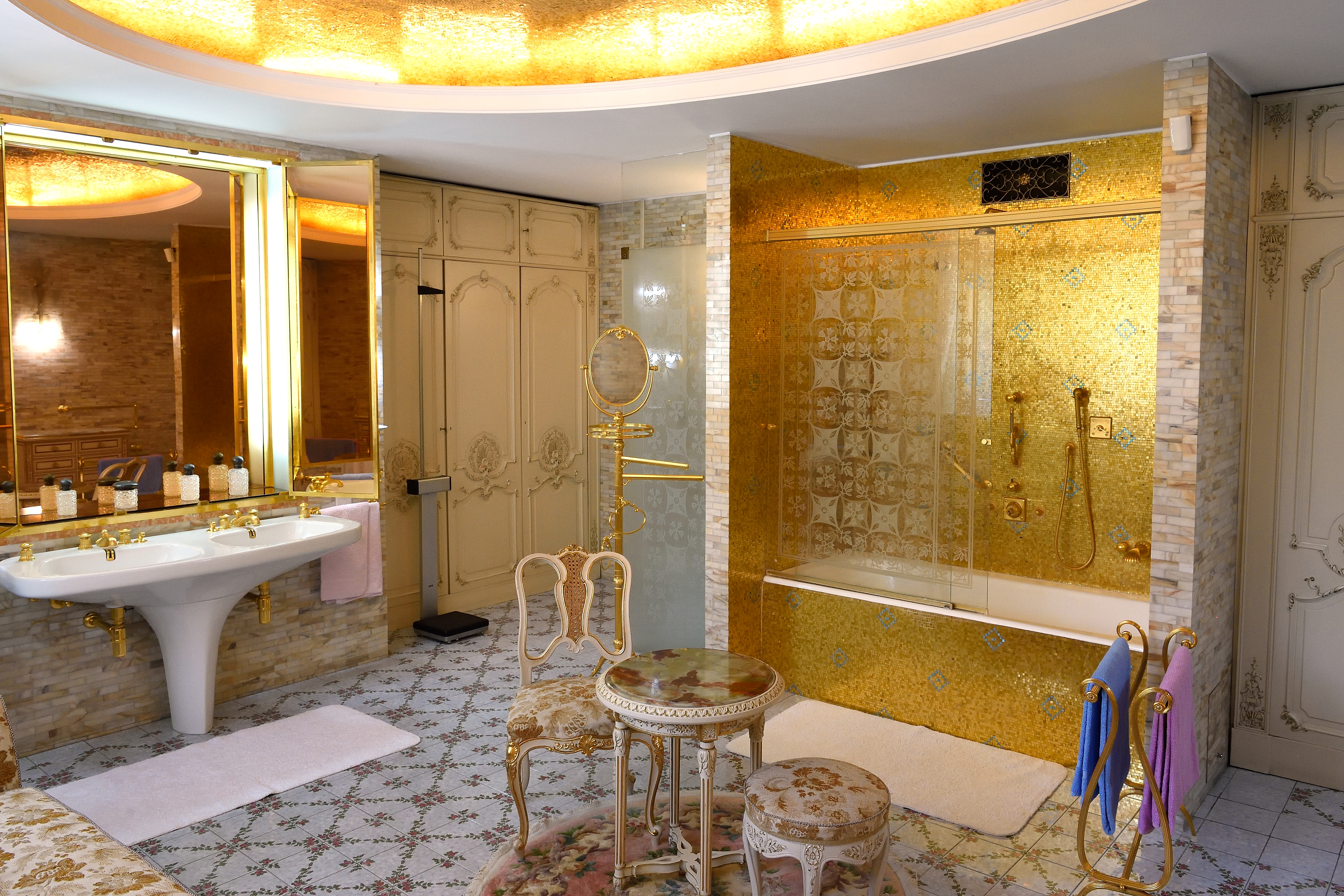
Bathroom

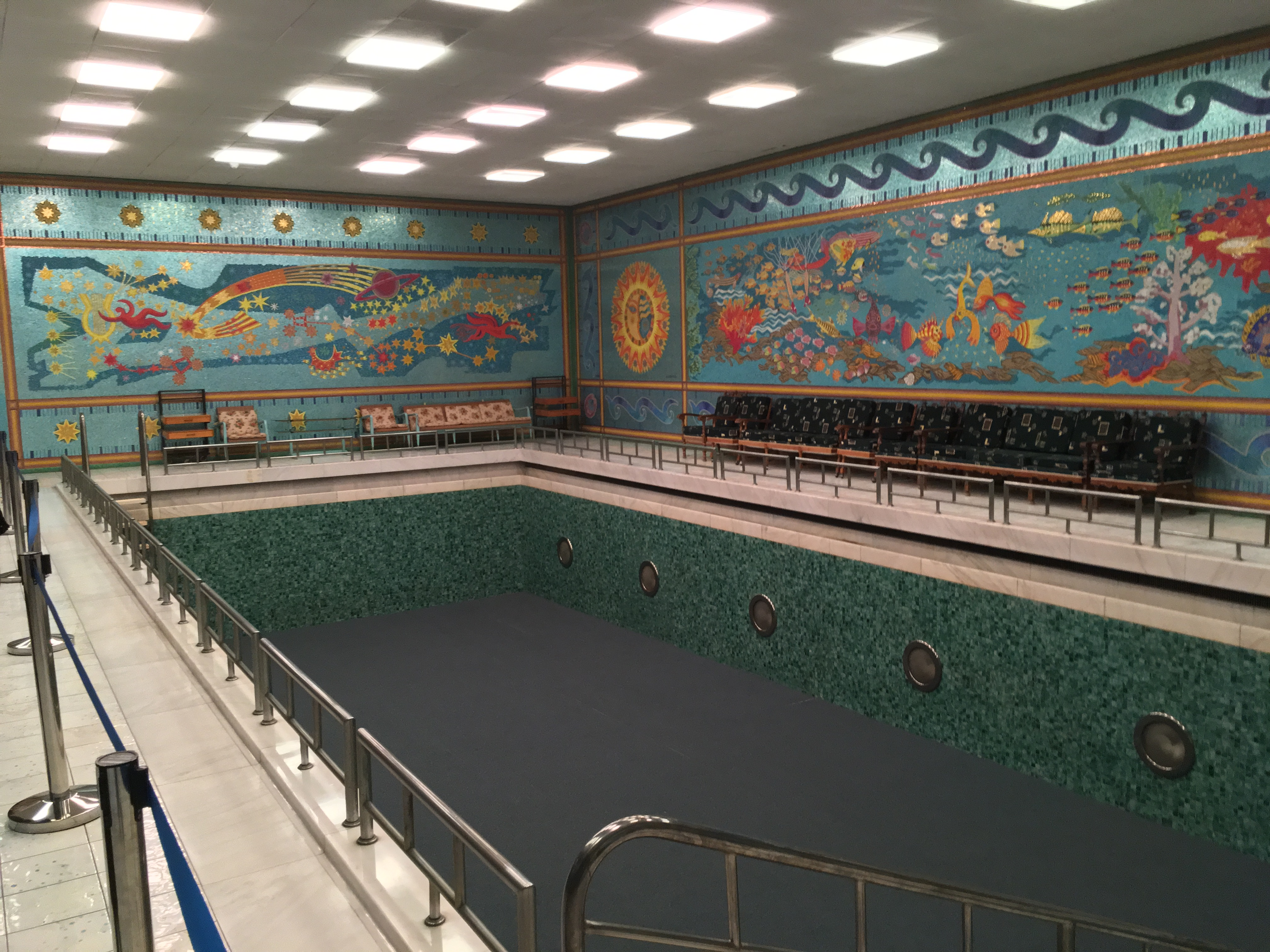
Pool

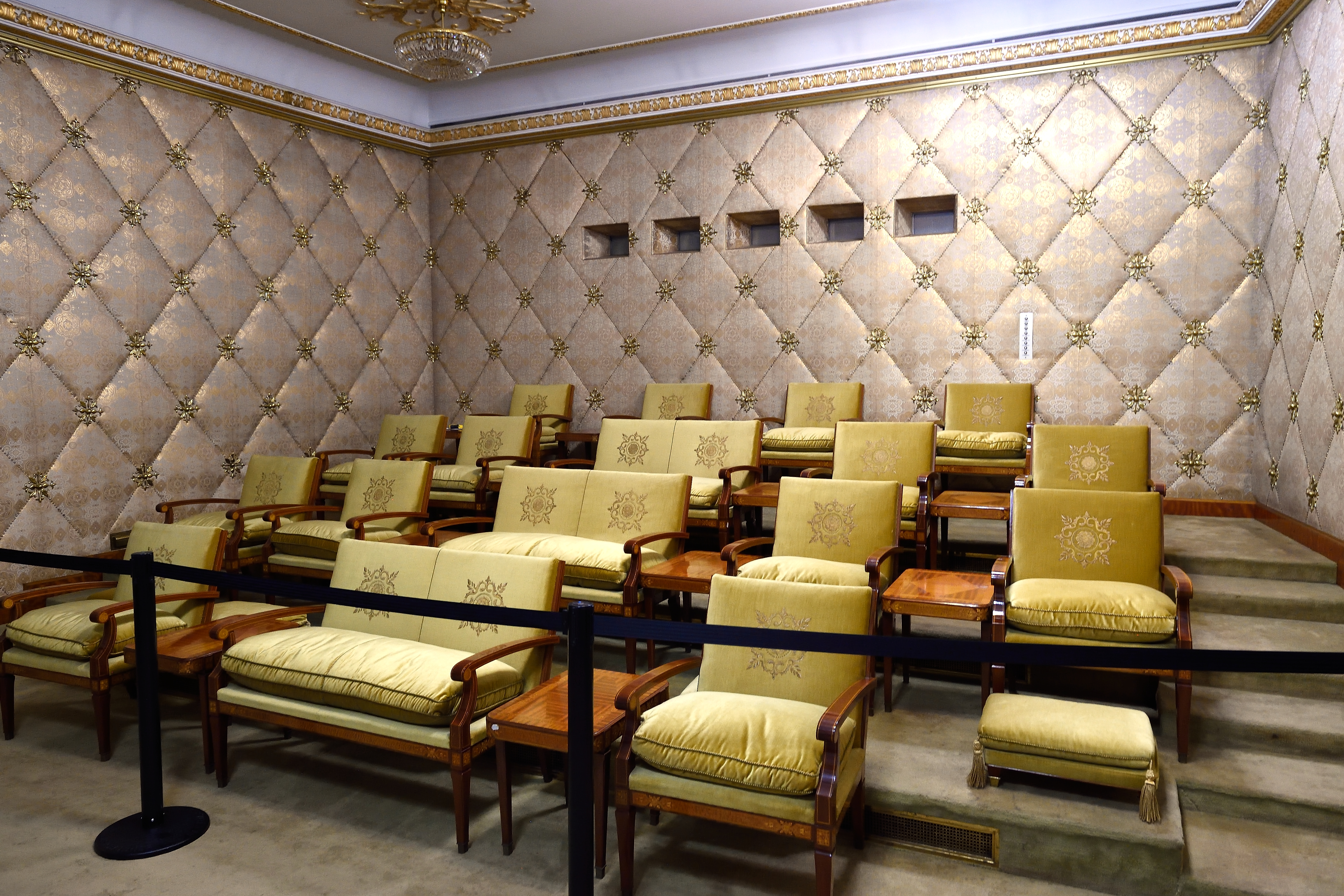
Cinema

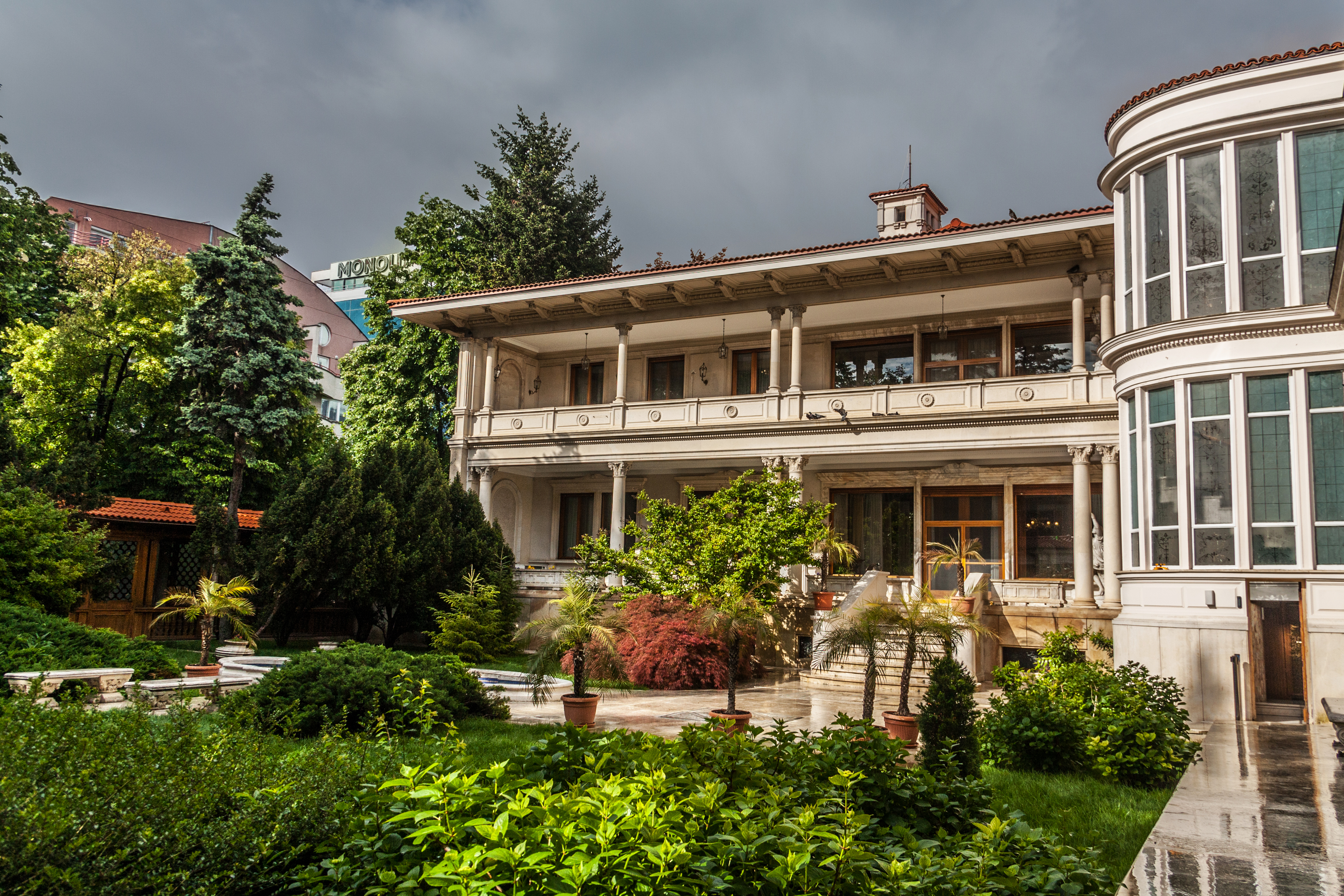
Garden
