= Găujani (river) =

- Location within Romania

Location
- Country: Romania
- Counties: Vâlcea County
- Villages: Găujani

Physical characteristics
- Mouth: Boia Mare
  - location: near Greblești
  - coordinates: 45.4711°N 24.3278°E
- Length: 10 km (6.2 mi)
- Basin size: 36 km^{2} (14 sq mi)

Basin features
- Progression: Boia Mare→ Olt→ Danube→ Black Sea
- Tributaries
  - left: Boișoara

The Găujani is a left tributary of the river Boia Mare in Romania. It flows into the Boia Mare near Greblești. Its length is 10 km (6.2 mi) and its basin size is 36 km^{2} (14 sq mi).
