= Primăverii =

District in Bucharest, Romania

Coordinates: 44°27′57″N 26°05′29″E

Primăverii district on the map of Bucharest

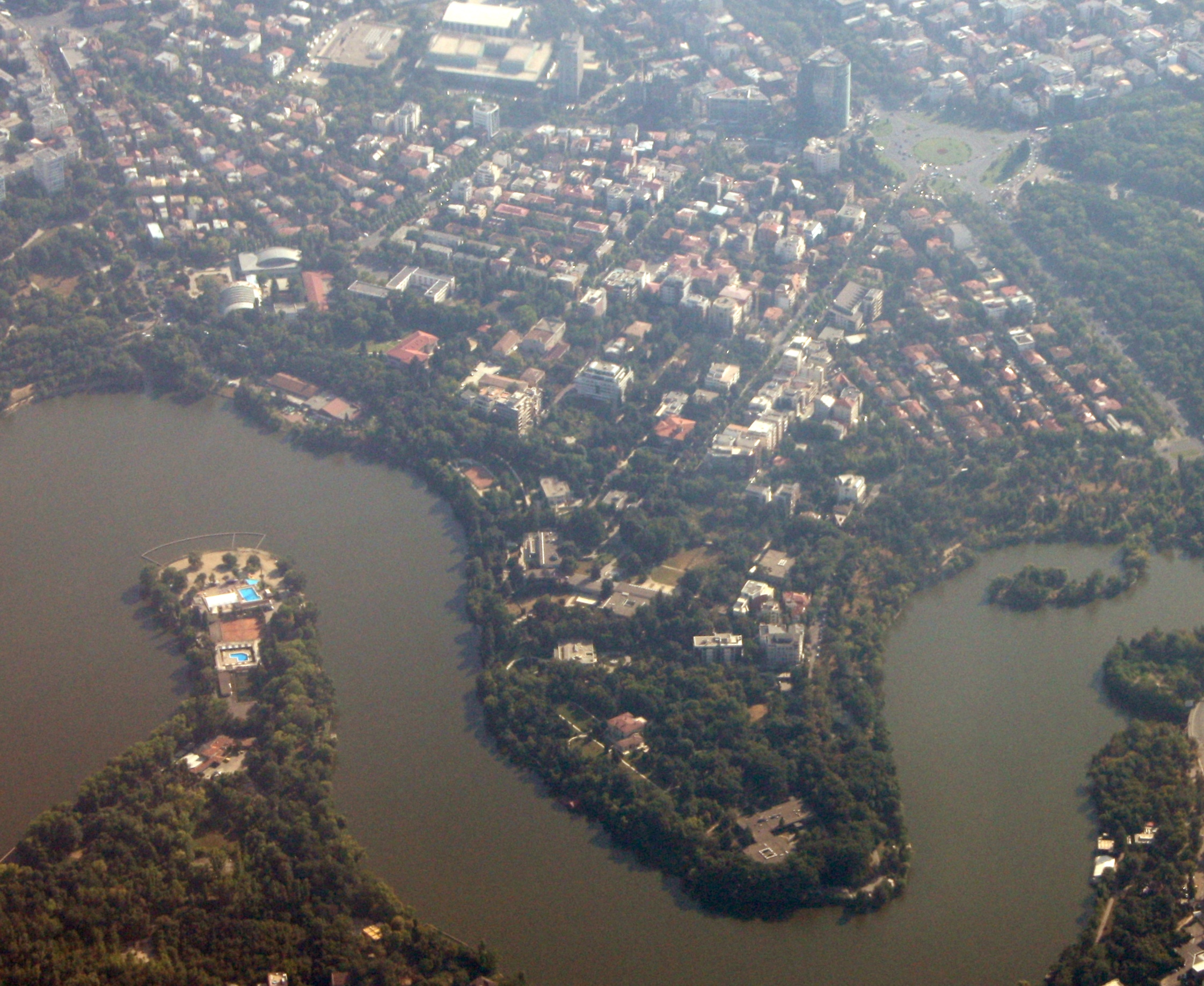
Primăverii, aerial view

Primăverii neighborhood (“Springtime”) is a district situated in the north of Bucharest, the capital of Romania, in Sector 1. The area is one of the most expensive in the city and is home to many politicians and local celebrities.

== History ==
The district is relatively new and was built on the old "Grădina Bordei" park which was situated on the outskirts of the city at the beginning of the 20th century. The park was given as a wedding present to his daughter Caliopi by Constantin Hrisoscoleu, when she married Petrache Poenaru. The domain was later bought by King Carol II of Romania.

The houses of the district were built in the 1930s as inexpensive semi-detached houses by architect Octav Doicescu. After World War II, most members of the Central Committee of the Romanian Communist Party moved to the area, with the largest houses on Primăverii boulevard being inhabited by the members of the Politburo. These houses, which had large gardens in the back, were surrounded by tall walls and heavily guarded by the Romanian police at the time, called Miliția.

Starting with the 1960s, the nomenklatura began building large mansions, with many rooms, parks, and swimming pools. For instance, Alexandru Drăghici built a villa on the banks of Lake Herăstrău, which, after Drăghici fell out of favour with the leaders, was later converted into the Primăverii Palace and used for heads of state guests. Nicolae Ceaușescu occupied a whole block of villas, including one for his security guards and one for domestic servants.

== Landmarks ==
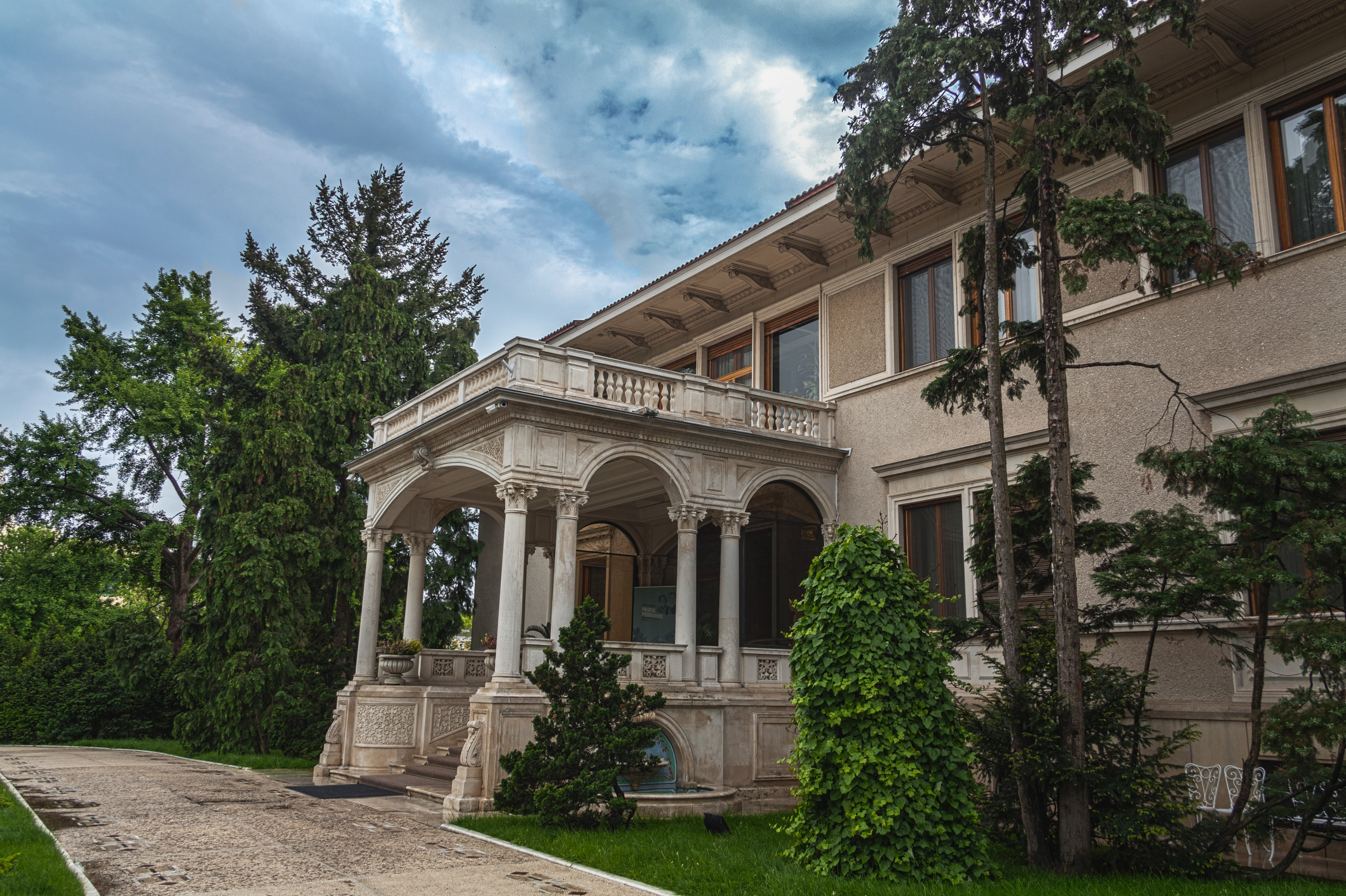
Primăverii Palace

Primăverii has remained an exclusive district since those days. Many historic villas and mansions are now repurposed as embassies, corporate centers, and museums. Some of these are:

- Primăverii Palace – Ceaușescu's villa, now turned into a museum
- Museum of Recent Art (MARe) – contemporary art museum

== Transportation ==
The district is served by the Aviatorilor metro station and by various STB buses.
