= Boia Mică =

- Location within Romania

Location
- Country: Romania
- Counties: Vâlcea County

Physical characteristics
- Source: Făgăraș Mountains
- Mouth: Boia Mare
  - coordinates: 45.5024°N 24.3739°E
- Length: 14 km (8.7 mi)
- Basin size: 42 km^{2} (16 sq mi)

Basin features
- Progression: Boia Mare→ Olt→ Danube→ Black Sea
- Tributaries
  - right: Suru, Corbu, Sterminoasă

The Boia Mică is a right tributary of the river Boia Mare in Romania. Its source is in the Făgăraș Mountains. Its length is 14 km (8.7 mi) and its basin size is 42 km^{2} (16 sq mi).
