= Museum of Recent Art =

Museum in Bucharest, Romania

- Muzeul de Artă Recentă

- Established: October 2018
- Location: Bulevardul Primăverii 15, Bucharest, Romania
- Coordinates: 44.46782724542148°N 26.089198459476425°E
- Type: art museum
- Collection size: 1500
- Architect: Youssef Tohme Architects
- Website: mare.ro

The Museum of Recent Art (Romanian: Muzeul de Artă Recentă, or MARe) is a contemporary art museum in Bucharest, Romania. The museum's collection comprises more than 150 artworks in a five-level, 1200 square meter facility located in Primăverii district in Bucharest.

The word recent primarily refers to the temporal coverage of the collection, which encompasses Romanian art from the post-Stalinist period to the present day. However, international art is also featured through temporary exhibitions. The museum is much more open and accessible than most older-type museums in Romania and includes a library, as well as other spaces for culture and the city.

== Building ==
The new museum was built on the site of one of the interwar villas in the area, which was demolished. This particular villa featured architectural elements influenced by Western (Moorish) design. Notably, the museum's guided tours make use of the house's historical narrative to enhance its appeal. It is mentioned that the renowned figure Ana Pauker, one of the prominent leaders of the Communist Party during the proletkultist era, once resided in this villa. Additionally, there are intriguing references to the existence of underground tunnels beneath the structure, further adding to its historical intrigue.

The architectural project, designed by Youssef Tohme Architects & Associates, is a unified monolithic structure made of dark-colored brick placed atop a fully glazed space. The resulting atrium is very spacious and open towards the street.

== Collection ==
The museum's collection comprises over 1,000 artworks created by more than 250 Romanian and international artists. Notable figures among these artists include Ion Țuculescu, Andrei Cădere, Horia Bernea, Ion Grigorescu, Dan Perjovschi, Hermann Nitsch, Lucio Fontana, and Michelangelo Pistoletto.

== Exhibitions ==
- Martin Creed: Thinking / Not Thinking, February 12 - May 2, 2019
- Martha Rosler, December 14, 2022 - February 26, 2023
- René Groebli. Ochiul Tăcut, March 18 - May 7, 2023
- Ce-i de Văzut, February 8 - May 8, 2023
- Efectul Picasso, September 27, 2023 - January 8, 2024

== See also ==
- List of national galleries
