= Boia Mare =

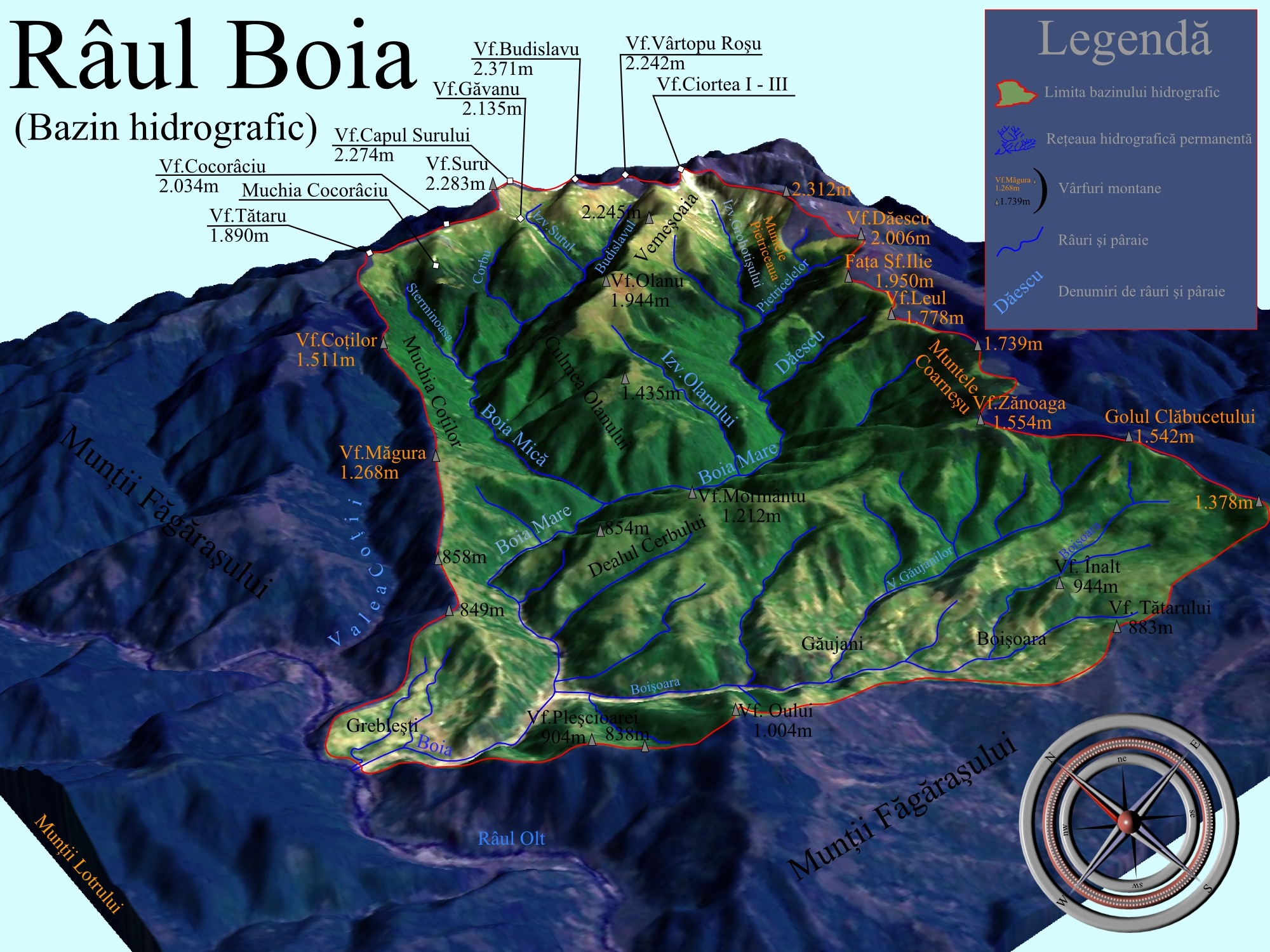
- Map of the Boia Mare Basin

- Location within Romania

Location
- Country: Romania
- Counties: Vâlcea County

Physical characteristics
- Source: Făgăraș Mountains
- Mouth: Olt
  - location: Greblești
  - coordinates: 45.4732°N 24.2966°E
- Length: 23 km (14 mi)
- Basin size: 158 km^{2} (61 sq mi)

Basin features
- Progression: Olt→ Danube→ Black Sea
- Tributaries
  - left: Valea Pietricelelor, Dăescu, Găujani
  - right: Izvorul Olanului, Boia Mică

The Boia Mare is a left tributary of the river Olt in Romania. The Boia Mare's source is in the Făgăraș Mountains. It discharges into the Olt in Greblești. Its length is 23 km (14 mi) and its basin size is 158 km^{2} (61 sq mi).
