= Boișoara =

- Commune
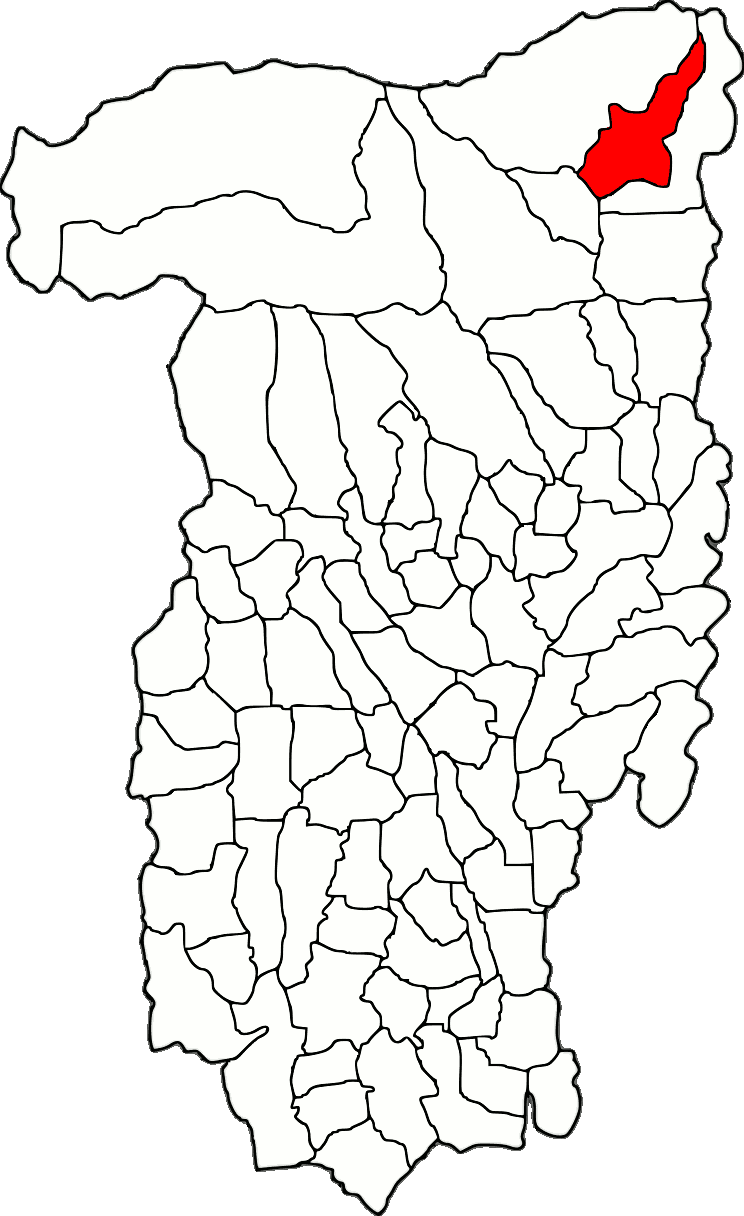
- Location in Vâlcea County

- Location in Romania
- Coordinates: 45°26′N 24°23′E
- Country: Romania
- County: Vâlcea

Government
  - Mayor (2024–2028): Ioan Cristian Mohanu (PSD)
- Area: 79.84 km^{2} (30.83 sq mi)
- Elevation: 640 m (2,100 ft)
- Population (2021-12-01): 967
  - Density: 12.1/km^{2} (31.4/sq mi)
- Time zone: UTC+02:00 (EET)
  - Summer (DST): UTC+03:00 (EEST)
- Postal code: 247050
- Area code: +(40) 250
- Vehicle reg.: VL
- Website: primaria-boisoara.ro

Boișoara is a commune located in Vâlcea County, Romania. It is composed of three villages: Boișoara, Bumbuești, and Găujani. It is situated in the historical region of Muntenia.

Historical population
Year	Pop.	±%
2002	1,681	—
2011	1,313	−21.9%
2021	967	−26.4%
Source: Census data

== Natives ==
- Gheorghe Ceaușilă (born 1966), footballer
