= Traian Brăileanu =

Romanian sociologist and politician (1882–1947)

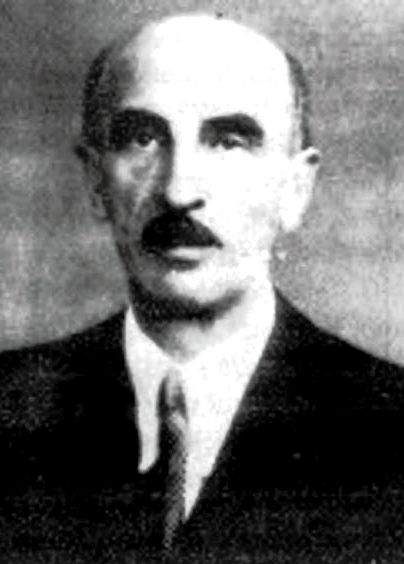
- Born: September 14, 1882; Bilca, Duchy of Bukovina, Austria-Hungary
- Died: October 3, 1947 (aged 65); Aiud Prison, Kingdom of Romania
- Resting place: Sfânta Vineri Cemetery, Bucharest
- Awards: Order of the Crown (1933)

Education
- Education: Czernowitz University

Philosophical work
- School: Holism; Corporatism; Kantianism; Aristotelianism; Scientific racism; Phenomenological sociology; Pragmatism
- Main interests: Epistemology; Ethics; Political sociology; Sociological theory; Political theory; Elite theory; Pedagogy

Minister of State Secretary for the Department of National Education, Religious Affairs and the Arts
- In office September 14, 1940 – January 21, 1941
- Prime Minister: Ion Antonescu
- Preceded by: Dumitru Caracostea; Radu Budișteanu
- Succeeded by: Radu R. Rosetti

Traian Brăileanu or Brăilean (September 14, 1882 – October 3, 1947) was an Austro-Hungarian-born Romanian sociologist and politician. A native of the Bukovina region, he attended Czernowitz University, where he studied philosophy and classical languages, subsequently earning a doctorate. Ending up as a translator in Vienna, he fought for Austria during World War I. At the conclusion of hostilities, returned to the renamed Cernăuți, now part of Greater Romania. There, he soon became a professor of sociology, leading a "Cernăuți School" of academics during the interwar period.

Meanwhile, he was involved in nationalist politics, supporting Alexandru Averescu, Nicolae Iorga and, ultimately, the extremist Iron Guard, of which he was among the most prominent intellectual backers. A theoretician of organicism, corporatism, and antisemitism, he inspired the creation of Iconar, a literary society, and founded the review Însemnări Sociologice. He was elected to the Romanian Senate in 1937, and reached the apex of his political career during the short-lived National Legionary State of 1940–1941. He served as Education and Arts Minister under this regime, targeting the country's Jewish community and his various political opponents. In the wake of the Legionnaires' rebellion, he was arrested, tried and acquitted, but later arrested again and interned.

Freed yet again in 1944, he was placed under house arrest following the coup d'état of 23 August 1944, and, increasingly ill with ulcers, was tried before one of the Romanian People's Tribunals in 1946. Given a twenty-year sentence for war crimes, he died the following autumn at Aiud Prison, shortly before the establishment of a communist regime that suppressed his publications for the more than four decades of its existence.

== Biography ==
=== Origins and education ===
Born in Bilca, Suceava County, a village located in Austrian-ruled Bukovina not far from Rădăuți, Brăileanu was the ninth of twelve siblings. His father Gheorghe (1839–1902) was the director of the local primary school for at least forty years. Gheorghe's father Ioan, born in 1807, had been a simple peasant, but two of his sons became teachers, and the third a Romanian Orthodox priest. Traian's mother, Maria (née Polonic) was the daughter of a shoemaker from Suceava, and married his father in 1865. The first serious tragedy in his life came when his sister Ilenuța died, leaving the entire family despondent. Another two beloved siblings died of diphtheria in late 1893, leaving him a mature individual at an early age. His mother predeceased his father, so that both parents had died by the time he was twenty. The young Traian was a voracious reader, his interests including classical literature, German literature, other European literatures in German translation, Romanian literature and Romanian history, including Alexandru Dimitrie Xenopol's Istoria românilor. He was attached to his brother Constantin, who settled in the Romanian Old Kingdom, which he represented as consul at Bitola and Thessaloniki; an employee of the Romanian Foreign Ministry, his son was killed in action during World War I.

Brăileanu attended three grades of primary school in his native village, followed by a fourth grade in 1892–1893 at Rădăuți, where he and a number of Romanian classmates spent the year perfecting their German and preparing for admission to the local German High School. He passed the entrance examination easily, entering the school in the autumn of 1893. German was the language of instruction; Latin and Greek the principal subjects. Upon graduation in 1901, he was fluent in all three. Entering Czernowitz University, he took courses in philosophy and classical philology, the subjects of his degree. His professors included Richard Wahle and Ion G. Sbiera. Initially, he shared a rented room with two older sisters of his, who were attending a normal school. In late 1902, after starting his second year of university, he went to the Romanian capital Bucharest to bury his father, who had sought medical treatment there.

As a student, he was associated with Societatea Academică Junimea, a Romanian youth movement. In December 1901, already a member of the local chapter, he was selected as editor-in-chief of its satirical-humorous newsletter. Under his aegis it appeared bimonthly, and some issues were written entirely by Brăileanu. In 1904, he was named president of the society's literary section. In this capacity, together with Ion Nistor and George Tofan, he founded Junimea Literară, a literary journal. There, he published a short story, a series of humorous sketches and several poems. The magazine had a nationalist and Sămănătorist agenda, and, according to Nistor, sought to counterbalance Austria's "hatred and contempt for all things [Romanian]". Another member, Romulus Cândea, described the society and its magazine as preservers of "the nationalist flame" and "the Romanianist line".

Upon graduation, Brăileanu became a teacher at a German-language high school in Czernowitz, but, not finding the daily routine suitable to his studies, left after completing the 1905–1906 academic year. He then performed his military service in the Austrian Army, first at Czernowitz and then at the officers' school in Lemberg. For a time, he held a series of low-paid jobs, including that of journalist. Around 1908, he was penning articles for various newspapers secretly run by Aurel Onciul, a controversial leader of the Democratic Peasants' Party. In November 1909, Brăileanu obtained a doctorate in philosophy magna cum laude, his adviser being Wahle. The same year, he became engaged to Emilia Silion, of an old Bukovina family; the couple, who married in 1910, had three sons and a daughter.

=== Academic beginnings ===
Thanks to his elder brother, in 1909 he obtained a position as translator at the Romanian Legation in Vienna, where he remained until 1914. During this period, he took courses at the University of Vienna and undertook research at its library. In 1912, he published a work of epistemology, followed by one on ethics (Die Grundlegung zu einer Wissenschaft der Ethik) in 1919. During that interval, he became especially interested in the work of Vasile Conta, a 19th-century metaphyisician and political thinker. Writing in 1915, Ana Conta Kernbach identified Brăileanu as one of "the few young men who are researching [Conta's] work".

Upon the outbreak of World War I, Brăileanu was drafted into the Austrian Army. Wounded, he was hospitalized in Bohemia, then moved to Lemberg with his regiment, after which he returned to Vienna. Meanwhile, his wife and the two children had taken refuge in Siret and then in Suceava, later returning to Austria. The union of Bukovina with Romania occurred at the end of World War I, and he immediately left Vienna for his native province, upon his older brother's urging.

Beginning in 1919, Brăileanu was a librarian at his alma mater in what was now Cernăuți. He occupied this role until 1921, while in 1920, he became a lecturer. In 1924, he was named full professor at the department of sociology, ethics and politics. As an academic, his objective was to write survey texts of sociology, then ethics and finally politics. His introduction to sociology, published in 1923, was noted for on the sociological work of Conta, whom he identified as the founder of Romanian philosophy, and also as a personal guide. Following Conta, Brăileanu described a holistic social system of organic unity, grouping "social tissues", for which he eventually coined the term "human community". While ethics dealt with individual behavior, the community was the inextricable object of sociology. His first major success, this work drew positive reviews from, among others, Nicolae Iorga. Nicknamed "Socrates" by his admiring students, he was known to appreciate the term, considering the Greek philosopher a model.

Politically, he was, after 1919, involved in nationalist movements within the nascent Greater Romania. Brăileanu was at first a follower of Alexandru Averescu and his People's League, the Bukovina wing of which he led. He was involved in a lengthy dispute with a Nicolai Mitenco, after deposing him as editor of Țărănimea newspaper and "purging" the party of undesirables. In September 1924, with an article he published in Societatea de Mâine, Brăileanu sought to identify the political problems of Greater Romania as they affected Bukovina's society. It suggested that, in the new political climate, "entirely stunted by the supremacy of timely politics, or what we call politicking", Romanian intellectuals were "caving in to a despotic domination by the bankers". He claimed that the Bukovina Jews were a parasitical class, 90% of whom "made a living from the stupidity of the native population", and justified economic antisemitism as a reaction to historical "imbalance". Nonetheless, he argued in favor of complete Jewish assimilation, including "long processes of interbreeding" with Romanians and a renewed social organization, based on the "division of labor" (with references to Conta and Émile Durkheim).

=== Joining the Iron Guard ===
Brăileanu eventually quit the People's League due to internal maneuvers that displeased him. Then, he entered Iorga's Democratic Nationalist Party, helping it to merge with remnants of the local National People's Party, under Constantin Isopescu-Grecul. Though he sincerely respected Iorga, and organized the party's Bukovina chapter from 1922 to 1925, he was unhappy with certain mergers the group had undergone, and again opted to leave. His decision, effected in November 1925, was censured by Glasul Bucovinei newspaper, which called him "the most egotistical and least reasonable among the tiny bosses in Cernăuți"; as noted therein, his departure had established two newspapers called Gazeta Poporului, one of which was under his own direction. Progressively, Brăileanu identified with the extreme right, claiming that the political mainstream took a "soft attitude" toward ethnic minorities. He migrated to the antisemitic National-Christian Defense League (LANC), which he left following a disagreement with its leader A. C. Cuza.

In 1926–1927, Brăileanu was member of the small political group called "Statutory LANC", which, as academic Lucian Butaru noted, was home to "shady figures of the Romanian political and cultural life", including Ion Zelea Codreanu and Corneliu Șumuleanu. At the time, he presided over a commission which investigated the clashes between Romanian authorities in Bukovina and Jewish students who had failed the Romanian Baccalaureate. He wrote an angry report, noting that Jews were ignorant of "the history and geography of the fatherland", and claiming that the riots were "premeditated". At the time, his adversaries at Glasul Bucovinei suggested that, though he spoke vehemently for both antisemitism and anti-Zionism, and though he condemned all parties, including Averescu's, as taken over by the Jews, Brăileanu had failed to also attack his lawyer friend Constantin Rădulescu—just as Rădulescu was representing the Jewish students in court. Brăileanu's antisemitic bias was eventually brought up for public scrutiny by Mayer Ebner, the Jewish community spokesman, and may have led to Brăileanu's eventual dismissal. This came in July 1927, when the governing National Liberal Party reasserted control over his university.

Brăileanu was one of the editors of Gheorghe Alexianu's Bucovina, a review of law, sociology, and criminology, and contributed to Ion Petrovici's philosophical journal, Minerva, with an essay on the sociology of Vilfredo Pareto. By then, his sociological work intertwined with his politics. As noted by historian Lucian Nastasă, he was one of the Romanian academics whose work exemplifies "strongly nationalistic and extremist ideologies". In his 1928 Politica, considered the first Romanian volume of political theory, he suggested the establishment of a military dictatorship to consolidate the Romanian monarchy. By many accounts, Brăileanu had joined the Iron Guard (or "Legionary Movement"), a radical antisemitic and fascist group, upon its founding in 1927. Historian Armin Heinen contrarily suggests that he was only a member from 1930; according to Glasul Bucovinei, Brăileanu had partnered up with the LANC's Gheorghe Vitriescu in the municipal elections of March 1930, helping him spread "racial hatred and animosity among citizens". Also that year, Brăileanu entered the Iron Guard's "Senate", helping to consolidate the movement's intellectual prestige, and is seen by some as its most important theoretician after Nae Ionescu.

Possibly radicalized under the influence of racial eugenicist Iordache Făcăoaru, Brăileanu's views on minority issues were recast into a scientifically racist sociological theory, which postulated that Jews were not capable of being integrated into any other nation. His support for racial determinism led him to conclude that "the variation of social types" was only a historical action of environmental and demographic factors, and that, in all other respects, individuals of the same race were identical. Brăileanu also founded the literary society Iconar, noted for its strong xenophobia, which eventually divided itself into a far-right wing, under Brăileanu, and a more moderate one, supportive of the National Liberals. Writing in 1936 for Marta Rădulescu's Revista Mea, he demanded a neo-traditionalist and nationalist revival in Romanian art, placed in service to "the Church and the State", and rejecting "kike commercialism". According to literary historian Rodica Ilie, his call to "purge Romanian society of corrupting influences" was a "trope" shared by extreme nationalists and communists of the day, the latter of whom targeted "bourgeois seductions" rather than "Jewish spirituality".

Throughout the interval, Brăileanu carried on with his research, writing textbooks of sociology and ethics for the high school level. A translator from German and Greek, he was especially drawn to Immanuel Kant and Aristotle. Brăileanu's translation of the Critique of Pure Reason appeared in 1930, being hailed by philosopher Tudor Vianu as one of the prime achievements of its era, but criticized by Ernest Bernea as "confusing" and "fragmentary". There followed more works on ethics (1935–1936) and the history of sociological doctrines (1936–1937). From 1931 to 1933, he was dean of the Philosophy and Letters Faculty. He had ties to foreign sociologists, and in 1937 became a member of the Columbia University-affiliated Academy of Political Science. In addition, from 1933 he was assistant professor in the history of philosophy department, replacing the deceased Vasile Gherasim. He was made a commander of the Order of the Crown in 1933.

=== Însemnări Sociologice and senatorial mandate ===
Brăileanu ultimately became the unchallenged leader of a sociological school at Cernăuți, akin to those led by Dimitrie Gusti at Bucharest, Virgil Bărbat at Cluj and Petre Andrei at Iași. During this time, he founded Însemnări Sociologice magazine. As noted by various historians, it should be seen as largely dedicated to supporting the Iron Guard platform. Brăileanu's articles there combined a condemnation of the multi-party system with the theory of "Judaeo-communist revolution", arguing that the former would inevitably lead to the latter, and proposed instead a corporate state headed by the Guard. Leon Volovici concludes that Însemnări Sociologice "did not differ from Legionary propaganda", with its ample references to "the Internationale of the yids", anti-Masonic lore, and calls for racial segregation ("complete, biological and spiritual separation from the Jews").

Brăileanu himself proudly acknowledged that there was little difference between his Guardist credo and his sociological work, describing Însemnări Sociologice as providing "Legionary doctrine" with "all the support of social science". "Doctrines", he argued, always took precedence over scientific observation, since "they determine the lives of individuals and peoples." Brăileanu's writings, including his articles in teachers' magazines, shifted toward developing a Romanian "elite theory" and the role of state pedagogy in cultivating a fresh political establishment. His idea of corporatism differed from that espoused by Mihail Manoilescu, arguing a strong dictatorship by an "ascetic elite", with a charismatic leader, could set up the Romanian corporations, but never the other way around. He saw his "meritocratic aristocracy" embodied in Ion Moța and the other five Iron Guard men who left as volunteers for the Spanish Civil War.

Invoking the examples set by Italian fascism and Nazism, Brăileanu argued that educating the masses to accept leadership and social selection "without a murmur" was far more beneficial than perpetuating universal suffrage. In a June 1937 article for Buna Vestire, he identified international fascism as the quintessential enemy of communism and Jewishness, and postulated that freedom was only possible within nationalism. Unlike other Guard intellectuals, he was skeptical of territorial expansionism, writing that, as Greater Romania, the Romanian state had reached its "natural borders" and economic self-sufficiency. His complaint was that the entity had not yet become a "nation state".

Like the rest of the Guard, Brăileanu found himself in conflict with King Carol II and the political factions who supported him, leading to a series of violent clashes and retaliatory murders. In 1936, he was one of 50 "nationalist luminaries" invited at the Guard's student congress in Târgu Mureș. The event ended with mass arrests for conspiracy, during which time Brăileanu was asked to serve as the Guard's defense witness. According to one report, Însemnări Sociologice was banned in February 1937. The Guard itself was also outlawed, but reemerged under the guise of the "Everything for the Country Party". Although by then a secondary figure, cut off from the major political centers, Brăileanu was deeply involved in its creation, in recruiting youth, and in organizing charity campaigns, his activities closely monitored by the Romanian Police. He was particularly enthusiastic about the Guard's work-camp network, deeming them the "formative school of the Legionary Romanian". In April 1937, he appeared in the witness box at a trial of the Decemviri squad, which had assassinated the Guardist dissident Mihai Stelescu. He informed the prosecution that he had known Stelescu as a "diligent commandant" of the Guard, but, when asked specifically about whether Stelescu should have been killed for his "treason", he replied: "yes and no".

Brăileanu was still the inspiration behind Iconar, described in police records as "a camouflaged Legionary newspaper of the defunct Iron Guard". Other magazines he edited included Cugetări, Poporul, Gazeta Poporului and Înălțarea, the last at Sibiu between 1940 and 1941. He was sent to the Romanian Senate following the general election of December 1937, having presented himself on Legionary lists for both Cernăuți and Câmpulung Moldovenesc. Nationally, the split vote resulted in minority rule by a LANC successor, the National Christian Party (PNC), with the king's endorsement. Writing in Însemnări Sociologice in January 1938, Brăileanu complained that the PNC's antisemitic program was incomplete, since it failed to target liberal democracy, "that which has made kikes all-powerful". The LANC, he noted, had been too moderate, "demagogic and corrupt"; the Iron Guard would need to reemerge and "turn chaos to order". He nevertheless displayed his and his party's loyalty toward the king, explaining for Buna Vestire that "the monarch represents the supreme principle of order and the political hierarchy".

Brăileanu eventually lost his Senate seat the establishment of a single-party regime, the National Renaissance Front (FRN), in February 1938. He withdrew from political life, while his Iconar disciples sought a rapprochement with the FRN chapter in Ținutul Suceava. He focused on a synthesis of his sociological theory, with Teoria Comunității Omenești ("The Theory of Human Community"), published in 1939 by Editura Cugetarea (second edition 1941). The work also signified his distancing from both holism and the mainline, positivist, sociological school of Bucharest, turning to phenomenological sociology and pragmatism, with more or less explicit borrowings from Edmund Husserl and William James.

=== Iron Guard Minister ===
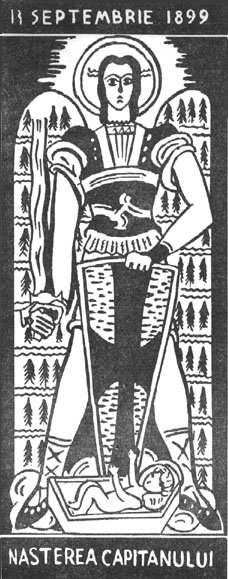
Alexandru Bassarab's propaganda art: Nașterea ("Birth"), depicting the Archangel Michael watching over the crib of future Guard leader Corneliu Zelea Codreanu

Due to the Soviet occupation of Bessarabia and Northern Bukovina in the summer of 1940, Brăileanu was obliged to flee his home, and his entire personal library was lost. He then entered the University of Bucharest as a professor. From his new home in Bucharest, Brăileanu was consulted by the FRN regime and Prime Minister Ion Gigurtu, helping them draft Romania's first set of antisemitic laws. A month later, the FRN dictatorship crumbled, and Carol II abdicated; the Guard seized the opportunity and proclaimed its National Legionary State, with Ion Antonescu as the Conducător. Brăileanu took over two ministerial portfolios, fused into one: the Ministry of Education and Religious Affairs and the Ministry of the Arts. His deputy was a Bucharest sociologist, Traian Herseni. The staff he appointed also included other Guard affiliates: Făcăoaru, Haig Acterian, Vasile Băncilă, Dan Botta, Eugen Chirnoagă, Vladimir Dumitrescu, and Radu Gyr.

Reportedly, Brăileanu's appointment prefigured later conflicts between the Guard and Antonescu: the latter disliked Brăileanu's radicalism, but yielded to pressures from Horia Sima, the Guard Commander. Immediately after assuming office, and at the start of a new academic year, Brăileanu spoke on Radio Bucharest, informing students that they were not required to join the Iron Guard, and also that the state would no longer require them to wear any uniforms; he expressed the belief that, once they would discover self-discipline, young men and women would join the Guard of their own free will. He also ordered sweeping changes in his ministry, but upheld and expanded upon the Gigurtu laws, equating interwar democracy with "the establishment of foreign and Kike rule". On his orders, Jewish students were expelled from Romanian high schools, excepting only those who could present proof that they were the direct descendants of war veterans; he allowed for the creation of a private-run, fully segregated, Jewish educational system. This policy enlisted protests from Jewish community leaders such as Wilhelm Filderman and Alexandru Șafran. Their protests, which went unanswered, noted that Brăileanu's criteria for segregation were more intransigent than the Nuremberg Laws in Nazi Germany.

Brăileanu similarly ordered the segregation of Jewish actors, who were sacked from all Romanian theaters, public or private, "without restriction or exception". They could only be employed by "Jewish theaters", which had to advertise their racial makeup, and could only perform in plays screened for "anti-patriotic" content. Speaking at the time, the minister intimated his goal of outlawing Judaism, and hinted at the possibility of destroying synagogues, finding that these were "too many, if compared to the number of kikes." One other decree issued during his term banned Romanian pupils from purchasing schoolbooks from Jewish-owned businesses, while another dismissed eleven Jewish high school teachers.

Brăileanu also went after one of his FRN predecessors, the left-wing sociologist Andrei, declaring him an undesirable, banned from teaching in all public schools. In October 1940, he countersigned the order to arrest Andrei, who was thus shamed into committing suicide. Brăileanu annoyed Antonescu by insisting on minute details of cultural and religious policy: he wanted to rename villages whose name still honored Ion G. Duca, demanded the removal of frescoes depicting Carol II, and also proposed to shut down the Bucharest Crematorium, which he saw as anti-Christian. According to various reports, his Ministry encouraged the display of propaganda material in high schools, allowing teachers to put up portraits of the Guard's assassinated founder, Corneliu Zelea Codreanu. The Guard was allowed to recruit young students, grouped into "Cross Brotherhoods"; teachers were prevented from interfering with their paramilitary activities, even when students skipped classes. Enlistment therein was facilitated by rumors that non-members would be barred from entering universities.

Brăileanu's other decrees lifted academic freedom, allowing the Ministry to intervene in college policy, and prioritized the academic employment of people who, like himself, were known Guard members or had been jobless since the Soviet occupation. He disbanded the National Student Front, the sole student association established under the FRN, and lifted bans on other student associations. However, these were effectively centralized into the National Union of Christian Students, which answered directly to Brăileanu, and the Student Front property was handed over to the Guard. Creating "review boards" presided over by Herseni, Chirnoagă and Făcăoaru, Brăileanu also presided over the purge of former FRN men, Jews, and known leftists, and personally stripped George Călinescu, Iorgu Iordan and Bazil Munteanu of their university chairs. He also ordered the immediate pensioning of all teachers aged 65 and over. This measure was designed to hurt Iorga, who had emerged as a major adversary of the Guard.

Brăileanu's tenure at the twin Ministries is described by historian Marian Ștefan as a "vast program for the political influencing of both teaching body and youth." He was applauded by Sima as a "doctrinaire of nationalism" and "one of the prime representatives of our race". Co-opted on the Guard's executive committee, or "Legionary Forum", he was still particularly interested in the creation of a new Guardist elite. Unlike Sima, he saw in it a conservative rather than revolutionary force, lecturing on the topic and having his ideas reprinted in Universul. He also attended to problems of school organization, took steps to enhance theological education, and envisaged a state-sponsored translation program of the classics. Like Sima and painter Alexandru Bassarab, he also promoted the ideal of a new "Legionary art", which advertised itself as the true representative of Romanian values. He described Codreanu as the national "educationist" and "great reformer of our times", and overall a "holy torch" of the Romanian people.

=== Downfall ===
Together with Sima and Herseni, Brăileanu sought to establish full Guardist control over cultural institutes such as Accademia di Romania, but their moves were vetoed by Antonescu, who favored a more conservative approach. Brăileanu had a tense relationship with another one of Antonescu's proteges, Sextil Pușcariu, who led the Romanian Institute in Berlin and had been given discretionary powers. Antonescu also asked Brăileanu to tone down his purge of academia, and the latter threatened with his resignation. Horrified by the Guard's assassinations of Iorga and Virgil Madgearu, in late November, he again tendered his resignation, but was persuaded to reverse his decision—allegedly, he agreed so that he could spare the country even greater chaos.

The Guard and Antonescu still clashed over issues of political control, until, in January 1941, tensions exploded as the Legionary rebellion. During these events, the "Cross Brotherhoods" were activated in various schools, and some of their members took up arms against Antonescu's more conservative faction. The university student corps was also highly active during the events, and later organized an underground movement against Antonescu. Within seven days, however, Antonescu had retaken control of the country and purged his government of Guardist ministers. Brăileanu's immediate successor was an apolitical figure, Radu R. Rosetti, who proceeded to undo the politicization of schools and universities. However, as Rosetti himself noted, the Ministry was in effect under Antonescu's direct control. In April 1941, Rosetti blamed "me predecessor" for having terrorized the mass of salaried teachers into accepting guidance from an "ill-prepared, but insolent and very active minority". Himself faced with ministerial suggestions for toning down the repression of Jews, Antonescu remained adamant that segregation was a valuable policy, and devised a system for its perpetuation.

Arrested during the counter-coup, Brăileanu was jailed in a former Bucharest barracks. He was sought after as an expert in Nazi Germany: in May, Ernst Krieck, the racial scientist, invited him over as a visiting scholar. Brăileanu was tried in June 1941 for "corrupting the youth" or "encouraging dissent among the military". After acting as his own attorney, he was acquitted of the more serious charge of treason, but sentenced to six months in jail for the lesser accusation. A nephew of his, Virgil Procopovici, who had been visibly active in the Guard, was also detained at that time. In December 1942, when rumors spread that Sima was preparing to return from exile with Nazi support, Brăileanu was re-arrested, alongside some 1,500 other Guard figures, and interned at the Târgu Jiu camp. He arrived there together with his former subordinates Gyr and Petre P. Panaitescu, and found themselves cold-shouldered by left-wing inmates. One of these was journalist Zaharia Stancu, who made a point of noting that Brăileanu looked "ill and profoundly miserable." Unusually, Brăileanu shared lodgings with a group of Jewish inmates such as Alexandru Albescu. Despite pleas from prominent members of the establishment, he was not released, whereas other detainees, including Gyr, left in February 1943.

Brăileanu was again freed in the spring of 1944 and repeatedly offered a chance to emigrate, which he declined. The year 1941 marked the end of Brăileanu's teaching career; he was forced to retire following his acquittal. Meanwhile, he continued his studies from 1941 to 1945, especially working on translations. In 1944, the official publishing company, Casa Școalelor, issued his Romanian version of the Nicomachean Ethics—according to literary critic Adrian Marino, it was a "failed attempt", and "downright impossible". Philosopher Cristian Ducu also notes Brăileanu's inconsistent translation of the term ergon, which results in "grave errors at the conceptual level."

=== Postwar trial and death ===
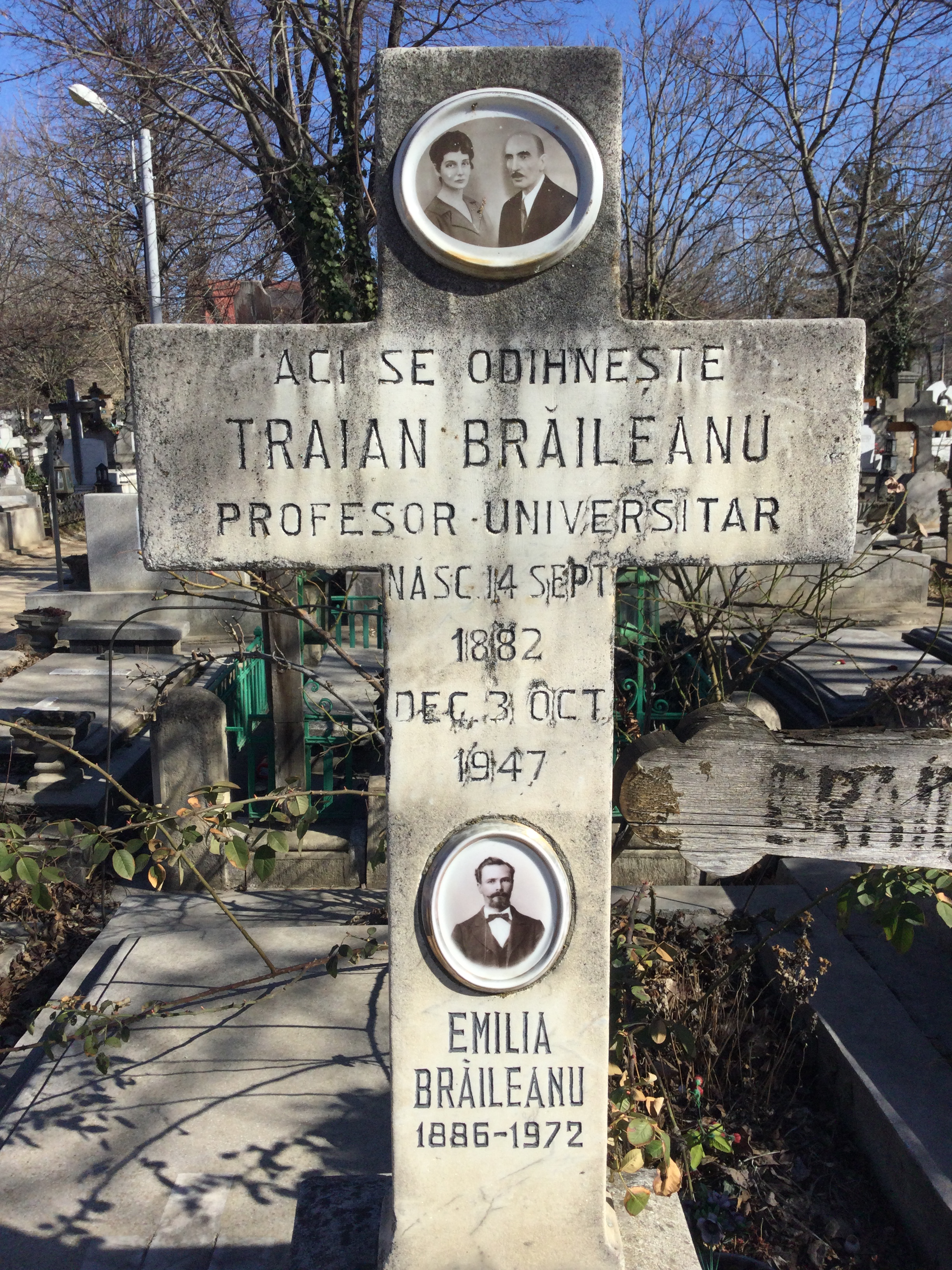
Grave at Sfânta Vineri Cemetery

Following the King Michael Coup of August 1944, General Nicolae Rădescu, soon to become prime minister, pointed to Brăileanu as among those guilty of the "national disaster" that had befallen the country. He was placed under house arrest, and was held under permanent watch in the room where he lay bedridden with a duodenal ulcer. In 1945, he was removed from his house, detained and taken to police headquarters. Hospitalized following a hemorrhage, he remained under medical care until his trial. This took place in May of the following year, when Brăileanu and Antonescu were among the 24 politicians brought before Romanian People's Tribunals, collectively charged with "bringing disaster upon the country". At the time, the Communist Party organ, Scînteia, described Brăileanu as "flushed out, disjointed, his baldness sowed with grey bristle hairs as on a worn-out brush, his mouth toothless, words emerging inconsistent, gelatinous". As argued by political scientist Ruxandra Cesereanu, such portrayals meant to induce the notion that Brăileanu was already dead to the world, a "living corpse".

Brăileanu was sentenced to twenty years' imprisonment; another official jailed at the same trial was Ion Petrovici, a successor of his at the Education Ministry. First held at Văcărești Prison before being moved to Aiud Prison, Brăileanu continued working on translations of Aristotle, as well as on a memoir covering the early part of his life. In 1947, he developed a severe ulcer and, gravely ill, was taken to the Brașov prison hospital. In June, a committee of doctors decided he did not require a hospital stay, and he was returned to Aiud. He died there, most likely on October 3. Shortly before, the prison doctor had refused to send him for an operation, and he was not allowed to access a package his relatives had sent. His family managed to bring the body to Bucharest, where he was buried in an Orthodox ceremony at Sfânta Vineri Cemetery. Others who occupy the same gravesite include his wife, who lived until 1972, and his father.

Publication and analysis of Brăileanu's works were entirely suppressed under the communist regime that followed his death. Some exceptions were made under the national communism of the 1980s, when Mihu Achim recovered him as a reference for "national sociology". By 1990, following the anticommunist Romanian Revolution, Brăileanu's philosophical output was again the object of public scrutiny. Controversially, sociologist Dan Dungaciu published a piece honoring Brăileanu and his theory of the elites in a May 1993 issue of Mișcarea, the neo-fascist newspaper. In 1997, the Romanian Academy's sociological institute held a session dedicated to Brăileanu. His ancestral home in Bilca was reopened as a local museum.

Brăileanu's one daughter was married to his assistant Leon Țopa (1912–1996). Late in his life, Țopa was interviewed by Dungaciu, arguing that Brăileanu should be understood as a sociologist, beyond his political commitments. Brăileanu's nephew Virgil Procopovici survived both his jailing under Antonescu and a renewed communist imprisonment from 1948, and, in 1999, reemerged as a legatee of the Iron Guard, republishing Guardist literature that he had kept hidden for the previous 50 years. A new edition of his uncle's Nicomachean Ethics appeared at Editura Antet in on around 2005; scholar Alexander Baumgarten criticized this editorial decision, noting that the translation had since been superseded by Stella Petrecel's (itself published in 1988).

== Selected bibliography ==
- Despre condițiile conștiinței și ale cunoștinței ("On the Conditions of Consciousness and Knowing"; 1912)
- Die Grundlegung zu einer Wissenschaft der Ethik [The Foundation of a Science of Ethics], Wien: Wilhelm Braumüller, 1919, OCLC 1114593652
- Introducere în sociologie [Introduction to Sociology] (PDF). Cernăuți: Editura Librăriei "Ostașul Român". 1924.
- Sociologie generală ("General Sociology"; 1926)
- Etică și sociologie. Contribuții la soluționarea problemei Individ și Societate ("Ethics and Sociology. Contributions to the Solution of the Problem of the Individual and Society"; 1928)
- Politica ("Politics"; 1928)
- Etica ("Ethics"; 1935)
- Sociologia și arta politică ("Sociology and the Art of Politics"; 1937)
- Teoria Comunității Omenești [The Theory of Human Community]. București: "Cugetarea" Georgescu Delafras. 1941.
- Sociologia și arta guvernării. Articole politice [Sociology and the Art of Governing. Political Articles] (2nd ed.). București: Cartea Românească. 1940. OCLC 895323888.
- Statul și comunitatea morală [The State and The Moral Community] (2nd ed.). București: Tipografia Ziarului "Universul". 1940. OCLC 611858704.

== Sources ==
- Lucian Boia, Capcanele istoriei. Elita intelectuală românească între 1930 și 1950. Humanitas, Bucharest, 2012, ISBN 978-973-50-3533-4
- Traian Brăileanu, "Structura societății bucovinene", in Societatea de Mâine, Issue 24/1924, pp. 478–481
- Radu Florian Bruja,
  - (in Romanian) "Traian Brăileanu în documente (I)", in Codrul Cosminului, Issue 12 (2006), pp. 223–231
  - "Traian Brăileanu in Documents (III)", in Codrul Cosminului, Issue 1 (2008), pp. 297–302
  - "Traian Brăileanu in Documents (IV)", in Codrul Cosminului, Issue (2009), pp. 297–308
- Lucian T. Butaru, Rasism românesc. Componenta rasială a discursului antisemit din România, până la Al Doilea Război Mondial. EFES, Cluj-Napoca, 2010, ISBN 978-606-526-051-1
- Romulus Cândea, Arborosenii: trădători austriaci și naționaliști români, Tipografia Mitropolitul Silvestru, Cernăuți, 1937
- Ruxandra Cesereanu, Imaginarul violent al românilor. Humanitas, Bucharest, 2003, ISBN 973-50-0481-X
- Roland Clark, Sfîntă tinerețe legionară. Activismul fascist în România interbelică. Polirom, Iași, 2015, ISBN 978-973-46-5357-7
- Anca Filipovici, "O incursiune în presa culturală interbelică din provincie: localismul creator ca simptom al periferiei în nordul Moldovei", in Raduț Bîlbîie, Mihaela Teodor (eds.), Elita culturală și presa (Congresul Național de istorie a presei, ediția a VI-a), Editura Militară, Bucharest, 2013, ISBN 978-973-32-0922-5, pp. 255–269
- Armin Heinen, Legiunea 'Arhanghelul Mihail': o contribuție la problema fascismului internațional, Humanitas, Bucharest, 2006, ISBN 973-50-1158-1
- Traian Herseni, "Sociologia", in Nicolae Bagdasar, Traian Herseni, S. S. Bârsănescu (eds.), Istoria filosofiei moderne, V. Filosofia românească dela origini până astăzi. Romanian Philosophical Society, Bucharest, 1941, pp. 437–598
- Radu Ioanid, "Extracts from Characteristics of Rumanian Fascism", in Roger Griffin, Matthew Feldman (eds.), Fascism (Critical Concepts in Political Science). Vol. IV. Routledge, London & New York City, 2004, ISBN 0-415-29019-8, pp. 119–141
- (in Romanian) Maria Larionescu, "Traian Brăileanu. Revolta împotriva determinismului social", in Revista Română de Sociologie, Vol. X, Issue 3–4, 1999, pp. 389–396
- Traian D. Lazăr, "Radu Gyr, rapsodul popular al pușcăriilor (II)", in Revista Română, Issue 2/2009, pp. 17–19
- Irina Livezeanu, Cultural Politics in Greater Romania. Cornell University Press, Ithaca, 2000, ISBN 0-8014-8688-2
- Lucian Nastasă,
  - "Suveranii" universităților românești. Mecanisme de selecție și promovare a elitei intelectuale, Vol. I. Editura Limes, Cluj-Napoca, 2007, ISBN 978-973-726-278-3
  - Intimitatea amfiteatrelor. Ipostaze din viața privată a universitarilor "literari" (1864–1948). Editura Limes, Cluj-Napoca, 2010, ISBN 978-973-726-469-5
- Z. Ornea, Anii treizeci. Extrema dreaptă românească. Editura Fundației Culturale Române, Bucharest, 1995, ISBN 973-9155-43-X
- Valentin Săndulescu, "Convertiri și reconvertiri: elite academice și culturale și schimbare politică în România anilor 1930–1960", in Cristian Vasile (ed.), "Ne trebuie oameni!". Elite intelectuale și transformări istorice în România modernă și contemporană. Nicolae Iorga Institute of History & Editura Cetatea de Scaun, Târgoviște, 2017, ISBN 978-606-537-385-3, pp. 141–180
- Marian Ștefan, "Invitație în lumea arhivelor. Liceenii și Rebeliunea", in Magazin Istoric, January 2008, pp. 41–44
- (in Romanian) Vladimir Trebici, "Traian Brăileanu. Omul și profesorul", in Revista Română de Sociologie, Vol. X, Issue 3–4, 1999, pp. 383–388
- Veronica Turcuș, Șerban Turcuș, "România legionară și impactul asupra instituțiilor de cultură. Studiu de caz – Accademia di Romania din Roma", in Anuarul Institutului de Istorie G. Barițiu, Vol. LII, 2013, pp. 261–284
- Petre Țurlea, "România sub stăpânirea Camarilei Regale (1930–1940) (III)", in Analele Universității Creștine Dimitrie Cantemir. Seria Istorie, Vol. 2, Issues 1–2, pp. 161–205
- Alexandru-Ovidiu Vintilă,
  - (in Romanian) "Traian Brăileanu, sub semnul imperativului categoric (excurs biobibliografic)", in Revista Română de Sociologie, Vol. XXI, Issue 5–6, 2010, pp. 508–539
  - (in Romanian) "Traian Brăileanu, grupul de la Cernăuți și revista Însemnări Sociologice (debutul unor dezbateri)", in Revista Română de Sociologie, Vol. XXIII, Issue 5–6, 2012, pp. 483–501
- Leon Volovici, Nationalist Ideology and Antisemitism. The Case of Romanian Intellectuals in the 1930s. Pergamon Press, Oxford etc., 1991, ISBN 0-08-041024-3
