= Constantin Gane =

Romanian lawyer and writer (1885–1962)

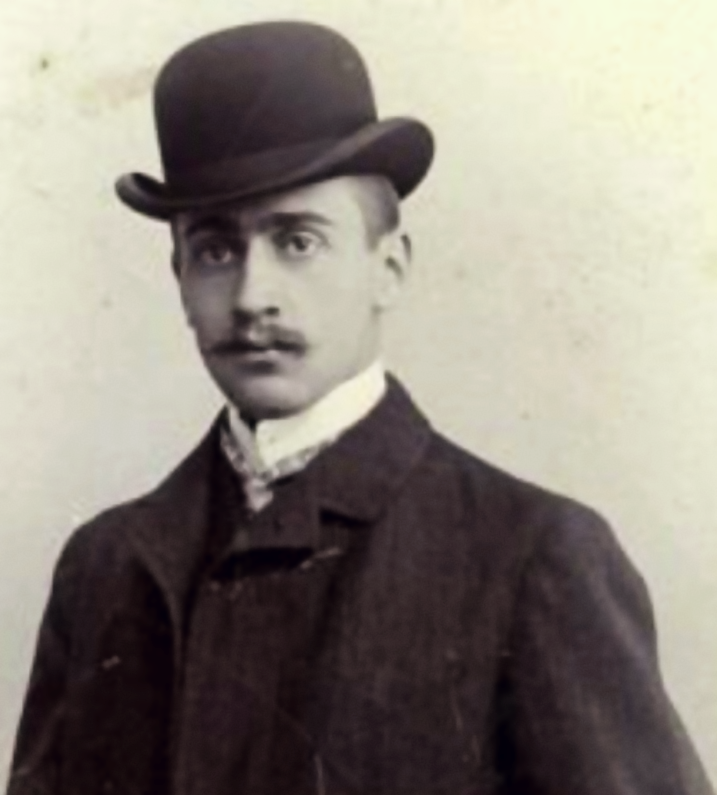
- Gane as a youth, c.1910
- Born: March 27, 1885; Botoșani, Kingdom of Romania
- Died: May 13, 1962 (aged 77); Aiud Prison, Cluj Region, Romanian People's Republic
- Occupations: Lawyer; journalist; diplomat; politician
- Writing career
- Period: 1914–1947
- Genres: Memoir; biography; travel writing; novella; historical novel; family saga; drama

Constantin Gane (March 27, 1885 – May 13, 1962) was a Romanian novelist, amateur historian, biographer and memoirist. Born into the boyar aristocracy of Western Moldavia, he worked as a lawyer in Bucharest, achieving literary notoriety with his recollections from the Second Balkan War and the Romanian front of World War I. By the 1930s, he was primarily a writer on historical and genealogical topics, famous for his contribution to women's history. An apologist for Romanian conservatism and Junimism, Gane also completed in 1936 a biography of Petre P. Carp. He was editor at Convorbiri Literare and a columnist for Cuvântul, also putting out his own literary newspaper, Sânziana.

The late 1930s attracted Gane into fascist politics, leading him to join the Iron Guard. This in turn led to his marginalization and internment by the National Renaissance Front government, but he was allowed his freedom in 1940, when he and other Guardists joined the Front itself (restyled as "Party of the Nation"). Returning to prominence in 1940–1941, when the Guard produced its National Legionary State, Gane served as Romanian ambassador to the Kingdom of Greece. He retired from politics for the remainder of World War II, and resumed his work in literature. Again repressed following the establishment of a Romanian communist regime, he spent 13 years in confinement, ultimately dying at Aiud Prison in 1962. His work was banned by communist censors, then selectively recovered from 1969. It was revisited and republished in the post-communist decades, although interest in it remained marginal.

== Biography ==
=== Youth and writing debut ===
Born in Botoșani, Constantin was the son of Ștefan ("Ștefănică") Gane, and had an elder brother, Gheorghe or "Georges" (1883 or 1884 – August 1941), who trained as an engineer. The writer repeatedly claimed multiple descent from an old boyar family of Moldavia, the Gănești. According to genealogist Mihai Sorin Rădulescu, his only proven link to this clan was through his paternal grandmother. Through this connection, the family were related to Postelnic Matei Gane and writer-politician Nicolae Gane, and also, more distantly, to ethnographer Arthur Gorovei. The latter lived in Nicolae Gane's house at Fălticeni and assisted Constantin with genealogical research. Ștefan Gane was originally named "Gani". He also descended from boyardom, but had more recent Greek Romanian ancestry, traceable to the Phanariote period. In the 1860s, he had attended the Französisches Gymnasium in Berlin. As a minor Junimist (known to have been active in that movement's "small game" section, the caracudă), he had met and befriended the peasant raconteur Ion Creangă.

The writer's mother was Constanța née Canano, one of the last surviving members from a Moldavian family of notables. Constantin later claimed that she was a descendant of Byzantine aristocracy, a theory dismissed as self-aggrandizing by Rădulescu. He also believed that the Cananos had more distant Italian roots, against authors which suggest they were "Levantines". Genealogist Mihai Gicoveanu proposes that his take may be correct, linking Gane to another Canano family, attested at Ferrara in the 11th century; the Moldavian Cananos' patriarch was a Căminar Constantin, active in the late 17th century—though Gane claimed to have traced his maternal descent to Postelnic Constantin Ciobanul, attested around 1560. The family was attested as belonging to the rightful peerage in January 1742, following reviews by a boyar commission which included Ion Neculce. Historian Paul Cernovodeanu views the Cananos as Phanariotes—and, more specifically, as one of the 36 second-rate Phanariote boyar clans (directly below those of the Hospodars).

According to his own recollections, Constantin grew up passionate about storytelling, picking up accounts from the family cook, a senior Romani man (and former slave), and from his maternal grandmother, who was a Napoleon enthusiast. After mediocre and unruly beginnings in school, he improved himself to take first prizes, being largely motivated by books which were offered to the highest ranking graduate. He completed A. T. Laurian High School in 1903 and went on to study law in Germany, obtaining a doctorate from the University of Rostock in 1910. After returning home, he worked as a lawyer for some fifteen years, both in his native town and in the national capital Bucharest. In the early 1910s, his prose was hosted in Viața Romînească magazine.

Coat of arms used by Gane and his family

At some point before 1915, Gane was secretary to Conservative Party politician Ioan Lahovary. In 1913, he took part as a volunteer in the Second Balkan War, destroying his literary notebooks before his departure for the front. Returning to Botoșani, in 1914 Gane was directing a literary festival honoring the national poet, Mihai Eminescu; as part of this effort, he collected memoirs from those who had been Eminescu's friends or acquaintances—including Dimitrie Anghel, Iacob Negruzzi, and A. D. Xenopol. Gane's combat experience was recorded in Amintirile unui fost holeric ("The Recollection of a Former Cholera Patient", 1914). It won Gane the Romanian Academy's Adamache Prize, which he shared with I. Dragoslav and Mihail Lungeanu. In a 1961 piece, scholar Liviu Leonte argued that all three were "outstandingly mediocre". According to Leonte, it was unjust that they won over a more gifted candidate, namely Calistrat Hogaș.

From 1916, Gane fought in the campaigns of World War I, part of the 8th Vânători Regiment stationed at Mănăstirea Cașin. In adulthood, he remained passionate about history, traveling domestically and abroad, rifling through archives and libraries, visiting museums and artistic monuments and researching oral tradition. He published prose (especially of a historical character), articles, notes and reviews, correspondence, travel accounts, plays and novel fragments in Epoca, Universul Literar, Curentul, Cele Trei Crișuri, Politica, Revista Fundațiilor Regale, Luceafărul and Flacăra, and Convorbiri Literare, serving for a while in 1926 as the latter's editor. Constantin's brother Gheorghe married the Bessarabian belle Elena Morariu-Andreevici. She was the niece of Silvestru Morariu Andrievici, Bishop of Bukovina, and the great-granddaughter of poet Constantin Stamati. This made Constantin the paternal uncle of an architect, Ștefan Radu Gane (1923–1988).

A new set of wartime memoirs appeared in 1922, as Prin viroage și coclauri ("Through Ravines and Boondocks", 1922). This was followed in 1923 by a family history, Pe aripa vremei ("On the Wing of Time"). Also active as a literary critic at Convorbiri Literare, in August 1924 he gave coverage to Panait Istrati's novel, Kyra Kyralina, which had appeared in its Romanian translation. Istrati was touched by his review, congratulating him for bringing to light the true meaning of his work. Gane returned in 1927 with the notes of Întâmplarea cea mare ("Major Occurrence"), followed by a series of historical novels and tracts: Trecute vieți de doamne și domnițe ("Bygone Lives of Queens and Princesses", 3 volumes, 1932–1939); Farmece ("Charms", 1933); Acum o sută de ani ("One Hundred Years Ago", 2 volumes, 1935); P. P. Carp și locul său în istoria politică a țării ("P. P. Carp and His Place in the Country's Political History", 2 volumes, 1936); Domnița Alexandrina Ghica și contele D'Antraigues ("Princess Alexandrina Ghica and the Count D'Antraigues", 1937); Dincolo de zbuciumul veacului ("Beyond the Fretting of an Era", 1939).

=== Far-right engagement an ambassadorship ===
Gane also held conferences and, between 1929 and 1937, a series of Radio Bucharest lectures on historical, cultural and literary themes, including the first trial of Mihail Kogălniceanu, Dimitrie Cantemir, and the novels of Stefan Zweig. Other such lectures focused on details from the family life of Mihnea Turcitul, or detailed theories about the meaning of the ancestral ballad Miorița. In the latter case, Gane argued that folk poetry had recorded the mutual enmity between Moldavia and Wallachia, including their territorial conflicts over Putna County. This allowed him to date Miorița back to the 1400s or earlier. He also contributed to Ion Gigurtu's Libertatea, where he published a study on the formation of Romania's political parties (January 1934) and a genealogical essay on Maurice Paléologue (February 1935).

Before 1934, Gane lived on Enei Street, after which he moved to a home on Calea Griviței, near Gara de Nord. He joined the Romanian Writers' Society that year, and, from June, began issuing his research on the female branches of the Callimachi family as a serial for Realitatea Ilustrată. On October 9, 1937, Gane began putting out the Bucharest-based Sânziana, a literary newspaper. In part, this enterprise reflected his genealogical preoccupation, featuring some of Father Vasile Grigorescu's memoirs of life in Fălticeni (some of which spoke about the Gane family). During this time, Gane also published a historical column in the newspaper Cuvântul. Politically, he gravitated toward the far-right, and joined the Iron Guard in 1937—his recruitment as an intellectual "committed to the Guardist line of thought" was celebrated in January 1938 by colleague Mircea Streinul. Another Guardist author, Mihail Cosma, gave a positive review to Sânziana as a "Romanian gazette written by Romanian Christian journalists", contrasting it to the "Judeo-Romanian press [which] holds all politicians in permanent terror, constraining their activity as political thinkers and their political behavior". Cosma noted Sânziana for Gane's own contributions as a historical columnist, as well as for articles from guest writers Mihail Polihroniade and Nicolae Totu.

Gane then allegedly served on the Iron Guard's supervisory council, or "Senate". Sânziana put out a final issue on January 29, 1938, with Guardist-themed contributions by Virgil Carianopol and Mircea Eliade. It announced that it was suspending itself until after the scheduled elections of March. On February 15, in Bucureștii Noi, Gane attended the wedding between Guardist painter Alexandru Bassarab and schoolteacher Elena Cantaragiu; other guests included Guard leader Corneliu Zelea Codreanu, alongside Eliade, Polihroniade, Haig Acterian, and Ion Zelea Codreanu. Such associations with revolutionary fascism to made Gane a target for repression by King Carol II, who staged a self-coup and cancelled the elections. This regime, which formed a one-party state around the National Renaissance Front (FRN), prevented political suspects from working; according to the diaries of Victor Slăvescu, Gane "had no means to support himself"; Sânziana was barred from reappearing later in 1938. When banks refused to loan Gane any money, Slăvescu offered him gifts, which Gane promised to repay with books from his own collection.

By September 1939, alongside World War II, civil war had erupted between the FRN and the Guard. Gane was arrested alongside many other Guardists, and held in confinement at Miercurea Ciuc, but was soon released following pleas from Petre P. Panaitescu and Radu R. Rosetti. Later that month, he was traveling around Romania with Carol Victor, the nominal Prince of Albania. They visited Lahovary's daughter, Marthe Bibesco, at her villa in Comarnic; she described Gane as a "typical Bucharester from the year 1900, influenced by Parisian fashion of the 1890s." In mid-1940, the Guard reached an understanding with the FRN: on June 23, the two groups merged into a "Party of the Nation", with Guard leader Horia Sima voicing his devotion toward Carol. Gane, Panaitescu and Nicolae Petrașcu were among the first to sign up to the new platform. In 1940–1941, after Carol relinquished power, the Iron Guard took over government and established the "National Legionary State". Promoted in that interval, Gane returned to radio journalism, producing propaganda for the Guard's social service, Ajutorul Legionar. In late October 1940, he announced that he was going on an extended study tour of the Kingdom of Greece. On November 1, Prime Minister Ion Antonescu appointed him as the ambassador to Greece. He was still in Bucharest on November 11, when he attended the funeral service of two policemen and Guardist affiliates, Eugen Necrelescu and Aron Valeriu, held at Sfântul Ilie Gorgani Church.

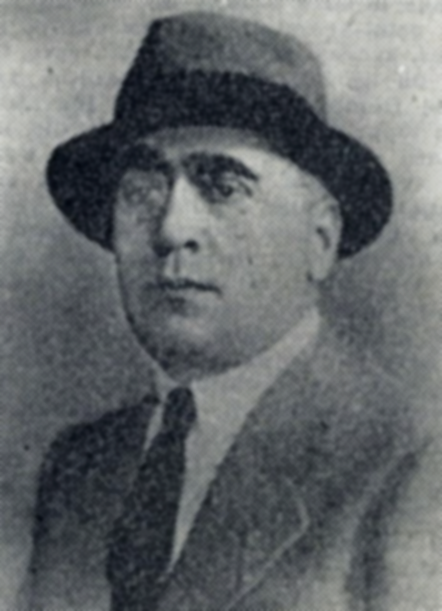
The middle-aged Gane

According to Rădulescu, Gane might have been chosen for the diplomatic mission due to his Greek lineage; nonetheless, while in Athens, he advocated on behalf of the minority Aromanians. He remained in the area throughout the Greco-Italian War and during the German invasion of Greece, being finally recalled on June 15, 1941. Returning to Romania, he was briefly involved in the cultural life of the Transnistria Governorate—carved out from Soviet Ukraine by Romania in the wake of Operation Barbarossa. In February 1942, as a speaker of Russian, he was ordered to assist Ion Radu Mircea with collecting and translating historical documents stored in Odesa, but failed to show up for this assignment. Staying in Romania for the rest of World War II, Gane focused his biographical research on the Mavrodin boyars of Teleorman County, with a topical volume published in 1942.

=== Communist repression and death ===
Gane also put out a 1943 sequel to Trecute vieți, titled Amărâte și vesele vieți de jupânese și cucoane ("Bittersweet Lives of Dames and Boyaresses"). Also then, he founded the Romanian Genealogical Circle, a learned society also joined by Ioan C. Filitti, Constantin C. Giurescu, Emanoil Hagi-Moscu, Octav-George Lecca, Gheorghe G. Bezviconi, Dan Cernovodeanu, George D. Florescu, and Vasile Panopol. In early 1944, Gane was publishing the circle's specialized yearbook Arhiva Genealogică Română, which he described as the continuation of works undertaken by Sever Zotta; he was additionally lecturing on behalf of the YMCA at the Bucharest Atheneum.

Shortly after Romania proclaimed an armistice with Soviet Russia in mid-1944, Gane fled Bucharest, hiding out on the Sebeș (Frumoasa) Valley alongside the poet and fellow diplomat Lucian Blaga; their host was a local peasant, who had been active in the Iron Guard. They reportedly asked another Guardist, Nistor Chioreanu, to arrange their clandestine departure to German-occupied France, but both changed their mind. As Chioreanu notes, only Blaga managed to escape the political backlash. Gane was again arrested shortly after, then sent to a concentration camp in Caracal, sharing his cell with Panaitescu and the missionary priest Ilarion Felea. According to Felea, the conditions were generally harsh, and food was scarce. Another fellow inmate, Onisifor Ghibu, reports that Gane, who had aged prematurely and looked like a "Byzantine saint", was frantically writing a novel called Rădăcini ("Roots").

The deteriorating political climate also caused Arhiva Genealogică Română to be shut down after only one issue. In 1946, a number of Gane's books were formally banned through an order issued by Propaganda Minister Petre Constantinescu-Iași. Rădăcini was approved for publishing in 1947, and remains his final work. He was released from camp by 1948, but singled out for repression by the communist regime. Agents of the Securitate identified him as a figure on the far-right of anti-communist resistance, reporting that Gane was acting as an adviser to Petrașcu. Gane was re-arrested in December 1948, as part of a clampdown, and sentenced in 1949. He was dispatched to Aiud Prison in Cluj Region, where he was subjected to mistreatment and pushed to exhaustion. Though he reportedly maintained his humor and was physically strong, his refusal to undergo re-education made him a target for special abuse: he was sent into solitary confinement in an unheated cell, and made to stand on his feet throughout the working day. He complained of exhaustion and told his jailer that he was on the brink of dying; they ultimately released him after other prisoners proceeded to bang on their cell doors and demand that Gane be spared. The Securitate promised him treatment for his medical conditions, if he agreed to write articles praising the regime—something which Gane refused to do.

While the genealogist was still recovering in 1962, the authorities reportedly issued papers allowing his release from prison. Gane died in Aiud before this could happen, and was buried in an unmarked grave. His death is commonly believed to have occurred in April 1962, but the Gane family records the date as May 13. In 1969, a relative liberalization allowed mentions of the deceased writer, and his nephew, Gheorghe Gane, Jr (1925–2008), published a brief bio in Clopotul of Botoșani. He also kept his uncle's genealogical archive in a Bucharest garage, before emigrating to West Germany; some of these papers were then preserved by genealogist and family friend Ștefan C. Gorovei. Nephew Ștefan Radu also emigrated in 1974, spending the 1980s as a prominent critic of urban planning in Communist Romania.

Trecute vieți de doamne și domnițe was reissued by Editura Junimea in 1971–1973, albeit touched by communist censorship. He was still offered praise in some contexts, including by Luceafărul journalist Artur Silvestri, who wrote that Gane and his contemporary Radu Rosetti had retold historical events with an "outstanding epic vein." Historian George Potra observed in 1980 that Gane had not been mentioned in reference works, despite being a "valuable author". In 1985, journalist Vartan Arachelian, in his book about the intertwined destinies of World War I, gave a positive coverage of Gane's military service, depicted as a feat of outstanding patriotism. Selectivity of coverage was only ended by the Romanian Revolution of 1989, which allowed Gane's work to be fully revisited. A Constantin Gane Street was consecrated in Botoșani, while, in 2006, Amărâte și vesele vieți went through a reprint at Gheorghe Marin Speteanu publishers of Bucharest. Although this was largely a Speteanu family project, and therefore "not first-rate", Rădulescu expressed hopes that it would resurrect interest in Gane's work. Nevertheless, as Gorovei argues, by 2011 Gane was still "entirely outside the scope of public attention." Humanitas published an unabridged edition of Trecute vieți in 2014. This was followed in 2016 by a reprint of Amărâte și vesele vieți, at Editura Corint.

== Work ==
=== Novelist and biographer ===
Gane's debut was as a humorist—a talented one, according to fellow writer-historian Nicolae Iorga. The war memoirs were noted for their sincerity and patriotic emphasis. His first book featured a detailed description of his bout with cholera, which he contracted while fighting in Bulgaria. It was among the first literary records of the Second Balkan War in Romania—alongside works by Iorga, Al. Lascarov-Moldovanu, and Haralamb Lecca; as well as one of the period books giving Romanian impressions of Bulgaria. As such, Gane is highly critical of Bulgarian society, describing the barren landscape as fundamentally inferior to the corresponding Romanian bank of the Danube. On its publication, Amintirile unui fost holeric was embraced by novelist Mihail Sadoveanu as an accurate record for the "sad and bitter reality" of the 1913 expedition. Overall, it stands out for its defense of the campaign, describing the masses of soldiers as generally enthusiastic about going to war. As Gane argues, Romania "restored peace" and earned Europe's respect; this contrasts pronouncements by other veterans, including V. Dragoșescu—who claimed that the campaign could only hurt Romania in the long run. Prin viroage și coclauri is a first-hand source on life during trench warfare, detailing the parties and superstitions of soldiers reduced to that lifestyle. Întâmplarea cea mare is a more subdued travel account where the author digresses into meditations on Romanian and foreign history. The artifacts of ancient Egypt and especially Greece lead him to literary and mythological reflections; he also describes these countries' present-day realities, sometimes in a humorous tone. Overall an argument for classical culture evoking Reiner Maria Rilke's Notebooks of Malte Laurids Brigge (and similarly enclosing an "approximate novella"), it was recommended by columnist Romulus Dianu as "unbearably sweet and agreeable".

When writing about Romanian history, Gane's historic and literary focuses combined to produce evocative social and political portraits. In 1947, literary critic Perpessicius asserted that Gane struck a "singular note in our historical literature", moving between the "romanticized document" and the novel itself—in both sets of works, the narrator shows up as a "discreet" participant, with clues and musings. Pe aripa vremei traces his own family's genealogical tree up to the foundation of Moldavia, while Acum o sută de ani recounts the main events that occurred in the Danubian Principalities a century earlier (1834–1835). His interest in the human character was explored in Farmece, an account of Despot Vodă; and in Dincolo de zbuciumul veacului, which selects grandiose and tragic figures from the turbulent Middle Ages. A family saga centered on the estate of Măcișeni, Rădăcini did not have much impact, although it was favorably reviewed by Perpessicius. The latter praised Gane's talent for inventing emblematic characters to condense and highlight social history, though he suggested that some notes "sounded off-key". Gane's one play, Phrynea, remains in manuscript form.

Gane's historical accounts suffer from minute genealogies, an excess of documentary detail, polemical interventions and confusing or incoherent passages. One enduring and poorly reviewed trait was Gane's willingness to connect his family with the crucial events of Moldavia's past. In 1939, the literary scholar George Călinescu described Gane as the author of "corporate literature", who outlined a defense of the aristocracy and included himself in it, "seeking to prove his belonging to that caste". Călinescu openly ridiculed Gane for passing trivia about his own family into his works. Gane responded that there was nothing commonplace about his family. The writings did earn praise from various professional historians, including Iorga and, later, Lucian Boia; the latter sees Gane as "an 'amateur' historian, but quite professional with the amplitude of his documentation and his unfaltering narration". Likewise, Paul Cernovodeanu describes Gane as a "publicist with a passion for history and genealogy", but also as an "expert" and "researcher".

Gane's 1936 homage to Petre P. Carp is noted for its "hagiographic" defense of the statesman, including against assessments that Carp was wrong not to nationalize the oil industry; in a 1977 overview, military historian Vasile Pușcaș argues that Gane, like Alexandru Marghiloman and Constantin Xeni, only added his "personal opinions" to a purely descriptive overview of any peasant uprising of those occurring under Carp's watch, therefore "bypassing an opportunity to treat the phenomenon in its essence." Some of the chapters, such as the one devoted to Junimea society, have reportedly preserved their documentary interest. Literary scholar Virgil Nemoianu, who first read the monograph as a youth, argued in 2011 that it was still the best work on Carp to have seen print up to that point. He credits Gane with having inspired his own self-identification as a Junimist.

The book, and especially its opening chapter, highlighted a clash of conservative visions between Iorga and Gane. In his response, Iorga advised Gane to refrain from writing political history, for which he was unqualified. Iorga substantiated this allegation by listing errors supposedly found in Gane's chapter, including the "calumny" regarding Alexandru Ioan Cuza's involvement in a conspiracy against Barbu Catargiu. Iorga also notes Gane's obstinacy in denying evidence about Carp's lowly origin and for "exaggerating" his political role, but also praises him for rediscovering Carp's first published essays. Controversy surrounds other such contributions to the biographical genre. Perpessicius views Gane's work on the Count d'Antraigues as a "most important" contribution, commending Gane for his research into the Dijon city archives. However, later reviewers have argued that the book is in large part an unwitting hoax. Cernovodeanu criticizes Gane for basing his entire book on a "romantic" theory, which identified "Princess Alexandrina Ghica" with a daughter of Grigore III; according to Cernovodeanu, the "Princess" was actually an impostor, and d'Antraigues her enabler.

=== Women's historian ===
Gane's enduring masterpiece is Trecute vieți de doamne și domnițe, volume I of which was granted a prize by the Romanian Academy. The book features a vast array of noble ladies from the time of the first voievodes until the union of the Principalities, against the backdrop of chaotic historical events. Among the more memorable figures are Doamna Chiajna and Elisabeta Movilă, and the tragic end of Domnița Ruxandra has drawn praise. As noted by critics, the subjects are unusual and captivating, revealed in stories full of color, recounted in a language of archaic vigor. In 1933, theologian and journalist Grigore T. Marcu saluted Gane's "exceptional talent for storytelling, his voice seeped into the dusty chronicles of our nation", producing "a lively fresco from the lives of princely ladies and children". Some 70 years later, writer Gheorghe Grigurcu revisited Trecute vieți as "one of the essential books of my childhood [...], with its rich literary savor pulsating within the arteries of complicated historical reconstructions". According to literary critic Ioan Milică, Gane reused classical storytelling formulas recalling Ion Budai-Deleanu and Ion Creangă in creating portrait-caricatures—for instance, that of the sailor-prince Nicholas Mavrogenes. Love stories, abductions and releases, spectacular executions (such as those of Constantin Brâncoveanu and his sons), rises and falls succeed one another in a steady rhythm that recreates the atmosphere of the periods it depicts. Scholar Constanța Vintilă-Ghițulescu views Gane's study as a "landmark" in Romanian women's history, but also cautions that it belongs to the "tiny biographical" genre and often switches focus to the male protagonists. In 2009, medievalist Ioan Marian Țiplic noted that Trecute vieți remained "the sole work of synthesis focusing on medieval women in all Romanian-language historiography, and even this one folds on analyzing matrimonial links and the role of women [in establishing] such links."

As noted by historian Radu Mârza, "many of [Gane's] assessments", including some of his claims about Michael the Brave, Doamna Stanca, and Nicolae Pătrașcu, are flawed, "bookish rather than scholarly." The book took a stance in analyzing Michael's supposedly lowly origins, describing his mother, Teodora, as an Epirote commoner. Petre P. Panaitescu, who endorsed this interpretation against Iorga's opposite claims, noted in passing that Iorga had previously accepted the account, and had even prefaced one of Trecute vieți's prints. Gane's claims on other such topics were similarly disputed: Slavist Emil Turdeanu writes that Gane's depiction of Ruxandra's marriage to Tymofiy Khmelnytsky is "not only shaky, but also counterfactual." Among Gane's contemporaries, genealogists Gheorghe G. Bezviconi and George D. Florescu both criticized the writer for his over-enthusiasm and carelessness; Bezviconi dismissed Trecute vieți as a "romanticized biography". Some passages of Trecute vieți also reflect Gane's polemics against Romanian Catholicism, from an Orthodox position. This prompted Catholic writer Mariu Theodorian-Carada to publish "corrigenda" claiming to expose Gane's "mistaken, sometimes unfair" views on the subject. According to Mârza, Gane's book is overall "seriously researched", but "is not scientific in nature, being rather a popularizing work".

The final installments of Trecute vieți were panned by Iorga, who noted that their "pioneering notices" were unveiled in the form of "light anecdote about serious people". Sections of these books drew heavily on new archival material, including the letters of Maria Moruzi Comnen. The author also had interviews with Marthe Bibesco, who provided details about the mental illness plaguing Zoe Brâncoveanu, and leading to her divorce from Prince Gheorghe Bibescu. As part of his research, Gane found and published portraits of Smaranda Vogoride, Princess-consort to Mihail Sturdza, and of Lady Marițica Văcărescu-Bibescu; he also helped record the life of Safta Costache Talpan. Nevertheless, Gane's research of the 19th century continued to feature questionable material. As noted by historian Pavel Strihan, Gane credited urban legends about Prince Bibescu and Marițica, and gave a-historical explanations for their legal conflict with the Wallachian Ordinary Assembly. As literary accomplishments, these final works were criticized by Iorga. He was puzzled by Gane's decision to include a rhyming preface ("curious verse, which we can do without"), as well as for adding "quite doubtful" explanations for the reader, which omitted a number of bibliographic sources. As argued by reviewer Sorin Lavric, Amărâte și vesele vieți is a counterweight to the main volumes, indirectly showing the relative emancipation of women under the Regulamentul Organic regime, but also the "baseness" of life in the post-aristocratic age. It also has a noted regionalist bias: there are 11 entries from Moldavia, 4 from Wallachia and one Englishwoman (Maria Rosetti).
