= Alexandru Bassarab =

Romanian painter, engraver and politician (1907–1941)

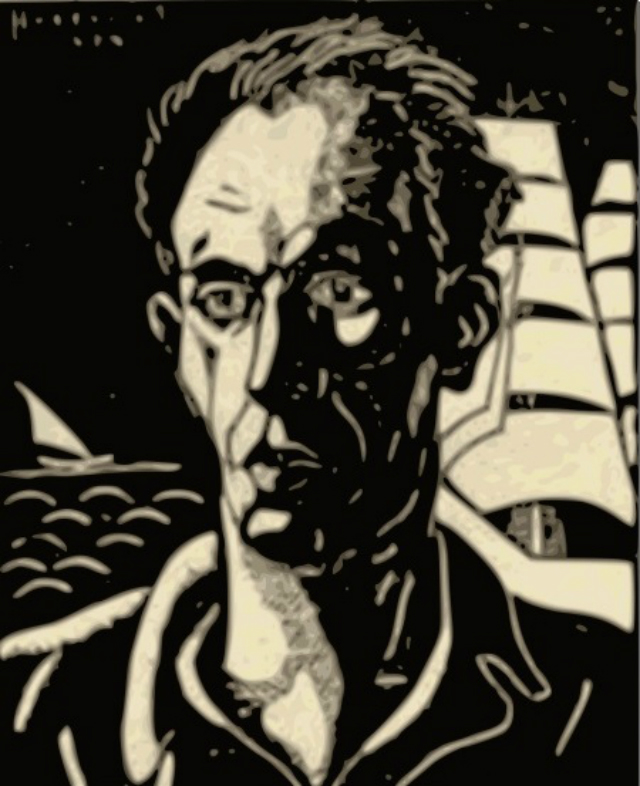
- Self-portrait
- Born: August 7, 1907; Bacău
- Died: July 8, 1941 (aged 33); Țiganca (presumed)
- Education: National School of Fine Arts (presumed)
- Known for: Linocut, woodcut, line engraving, illustration, typography, oil painting
- Movement: Arta și Omul; Grupul Grafic

Alexandru Bassarab, or Basarab (August 7, 1907 – July 8, 1941), was a Romanian painter, engraver, and fascist politician. Earning his reputation for his pioneering work in linocut and woodcut, he explored neotraditionalism, Romanian nationalism, and Romanian folklore, and was ultimately drawn into politics with the Iron Guard. He helped steer several art groups associated or integrated with the Guard, contributed to its fascist propaganda, and briefly served in the Assembly of Deputies. He survived the clampdown of the late 1930s, returning to apolitical work with Grupul Grafic, and exploring the legacy of Byzantine art.

Under the National Legionary State, Bassarab returned to favor as one of the leading political iconographers, also urging others to contribute "epic" art in support of the regime. Arrested during the civil strife of early 1941, Bassarab was allowed to redeem himself on the Eastern Front. He died there, in mysterious circumstances, while his work continued to be censored at home.

== Biography ==
=== Early life ===
Bassarab was born in Bacău, where he graduated high school. Likely a student of Ion Theodorescu-Sion's at the National School of Fine Arts, in subsequent years he attended both the Law Faculty of the University of Bucharest at the private art school run by Constantin Vlădescu, where his teachers included Nicolae Tonitza, Francisc Șirato and Petre Iorgulescu-Yor. Bassarab debuted as a painter—in May 1931, he a still-life of his was exhibited at the Official Salon in Bucharest. As noted by fellow artist Mac Constantinescu, it was "sensibly treated in a palette that is both somber and distinguished." He was becoming a specialist in the linocut technique, also praised for his work in woodcut. He continued to exhibit canvasses at various venues but, as noted at the time by art critic Alexandru D. Broșteanu, these were "timid", far less "rounded" than his woodcuts. The same was argued by Petru Comarnescu, who suggests that Bassarab "never fully mastered the interplay of colors".

Bassarab joined the Iron Guard, a native fascist movement, in 1932, and, as an aspiring propagandist, helped set up its artistic club, named after Ștefan Luchian, and its Ideea României Lodge. This enterprise also involved poet Horia Stamatu, who, in a retrospective letter of 1985, depicted himself as the group's theoretician. Also according to Stamatu, other members were George Zlotescu, Alexandru Ciucurencu and Constantin Joja—as well as, more marginally, Ion Țuculescu, brought in by Zlotescu. From October 1934, with Stamatu, Zlotescu, Ciucurencu, Ioan Victor Vojen, Dan Botta, and Radu Gyr, Bassarab was also active in the art collective Arta și Omul. Founded as an apolitical enterprise by Tonitza, it had been taken over by Guardist intellectuals, expressing its rejection of liberal democracy and its embrace of corporatism.

In parallel, Bassarab's apolitical works were featured at the Official Salons. Although he failed to win prizes there, in 1934 and 1935 the Romanian state purchased a number of his engravings. In early 1936, his portraits and cityscapes in various mediums were featured as a personal art show at Mozart Gallery. Columnist Alexandru Balteș was impressed by his achievements, and especially by his use of contours, "concise, somber and expressive". He declared Bassarab a "bard of the Bucharest mahala". His colleague N. I. Lazăr contrarily noted that Bassarab's "Bucharest views" were less accomplished than his other work. Overall, Lazăr rated Bassarab as "still a beginner." Alongside Stamatu, Bassarab worked on an edition of François Villon's ballads: Stamatu translated them, and Bassarab designed the lettering. Although the work was never printed in book form, it circulated as a rough copy among the intellectuals of Bucharest. Mihail Polihroniade used his engravings for his propaganda work, Tabăra de muncă, which came out at Universul publishers in 1936.

As a contributor to Ideea Românească review, in June 1937 Bassarab co-authored (with Stamatu, Zlotescu, and Pavel Costin Deleanu), the manifesto Revoluția așezării românești ("A Revolution in Romanian Settlement"). It declared the bankruptcy of modernist architecture as a staple of localized "internationalism", advocating instead for updating traditional Romanian forms. According to historian Roland Clark, Bassarab and Zlotescu endure as "[the Guard's] best painters", both of them being guided by Theodorescu-Sion's neotraditionalism; all three were indebted to Romanian folklore, depicting peasants as "active, heroic figures", "dynamic, virile, determined". Their art, seen by far-right chroniclers as a "purely Romanian" enterprise, was prominently displayed at the Guard's Bucharest offices, Casa Verde, during a September 1937 exhibit. He was only featured there with his woodcuts, including Arhanghelul ("The Archangel") and a series of depictions of the Guard's main leaders. Stamatu also recalls a "magnificent exhibit" of his group, held at Sala Dalles "in autumn 1937". Also in 1937, Bassarab and Zlotescu illustrated Neculai Totu's memoir of Guardist participation in the Spanish Civil War.

Bassarab had by then joined the Guard's new legal avatar, called "Everything for the Country Party" (TPȚ), and was serving as its regional president in Ialomița County—also holding a Guard rank as Comandant Ajutor ("Assistant Commander"). He himself ran on the TPȚ county lists in the December 1937 election. According to Polihroniade's retelling of the campaign, Bassarab was able to outsmart rival politicians, in particular those of the National Christian Party, ensuring that the results were properly tabulated. As a result, "the Guardist list took first place in Ialomița." On December 4, he returned to his native city, where Guard leader Corneliu Zelea Codreanu was inaugurating a Christian-only consumers' co-operative, specifically boycotting Romanian Jewish merchants.

On December 15, Bassarab, Deleanu and Mircea Eliade were in Țăndărei for the funeral of Ion Târcolea, who had been killed during the electoral showdown. Bassarab himself took a Ialomița seat in the Assembly of Deputies, but lost it immediately when King Carol II ordered a clampdown. Subsequently, the National Renaissance Front dictatorship kept Bassarab under close watch, documenting his participation (with Polihroniade, Ion Zelea Codreanu, and Bănică Dobre) in the clandestine Guardist reunion of Călărași (February 1938). On February 15, Bassarab married schoolteacher Elena Cantaragiu at a church in Bucureștii Noi, in front of an audience which included C. Z. and I. Z. Codreanu, alongside Eliade, Polihroniade, Haig Acterian, and Constantin Gane.

=== Political rise, downfall, and death ===
In February 1940, Bassarab joined Zlotescu and Valentin Hoeflich for another exhibit at Sala Dalles. Columnist Ion Zurescu noted his "daring" approach, and his growing similarities with primitive art. The clash between Carol and the Guardist leadership had by then escalated into an armed conflict. On March 17, 1940, Bassarab, like Gyr, Radu Meitani and Ștefan Palaghiță, signed up to a letter which affirmed their loyalty to the throne, describing themselves as legionarii de ieri ("former Guardists"). In that context, Bassarab exhibited with the collective known as Grupul Grafic, alongside Marcel Olinescu. Their work was apolitical, heavily inspired by Byzantine art—within that context, Bassarab remained the more naturalistic, preserving elements of perspective. Founders of Grupul Grafic also included Aurel Mărculescu, who was both Jewish and an anti-fascist.

In September 1940, Carol abdicated and the Guard took over, establishing a "National Legionary State"; Bassarab, Olinescu, and Gheorghe Ceglokoff reformed Grupul Grafic, which was now openly associated with the Guard, and exhibited at Sala Dalles. Bassarab now showcased work that was highly political, including portraits of folk heroes such as Horia alongside Guard commanders such as C. Z. Codreanu, Ion Moța and Gheorghe Clime. Ion Frunzetti, a Guard supporter and art critic, praised him as "the chronicler of a destiny", with "a certain Thracian toughness". On November 11, the Ministry of Arts took control over the Artists' Guild, and assigned its new leadership—with Bassarab, Oscar Han and Marius Bunescu among the new directors. Appointed to other high positions in the field of propaganda, Bassarab stirred controversy by suggesting that artists should abandon easel painting in favor of "epic" muralism.

During that interval, the Guard accorded its assassinated and exhumed founder, Codreanu, a lavish second funeral. The ceremony was held at Sfântul Ilie Gorgani Church in Bucharest, and the entrance to the church was flanked by two giant posters of archangels, massively enlarged versions of line engravings drawn by Bassarab in 1935. These closely resemble Nașterea ("Birth"), another drawing by Bassarab. There, the Guard's patron, the Archangel Michael, watches over an infant at his feet. Above, a legend gives Codreanu's birthdate, giving the image a religious and propagandistic impact. Another drawing of his draws upon folklore to place Codreanu in the context of the Miorița legend. In December 1940, Bassarab organized an exhibit, Munca legionară ("Legionary Labor"), also at Sala Dalles, which represented a fusion of art with Guardist ideology. It was attended by Traian Brăileanu, the Arts Minister, and Guard Commander Horia Sima. The same venue was also hosting the Ajutorul Legionar charity bazaar, organized by Codreanu's widow. Participants included Maria Antonescu, wife of Conducător Ion Antonescu, as well as Alexandru and Elena Bassarab.

Also in December 1940, Brăileanu's own journal, Însemnări Sociologice, put out Bassarab's article, Viața legionară, isvor de creație ("Guardist Life as a Source of Inspiration"). On January 13, 1941, he was a government representative for another ceremony, held at Casa Verde in memory of Moța, Codreanu and other Guardist figures. Days after, the Guard fell from power, and Bassarab was arrested on orders from Conducător Antonescu. When Romania entered World War II in June 1941 as part of Operation Barbarossa, Bassarab was placed into a frontline unit with a high risk of casualties, participating in the recovery of Bessarabia (Operation München). He vanished outside Țiganca. Legends began circulating that he had been killed while demining a field with his bare hands. Another account has it that he had been taken prisoner by the Red Army, detained at Chișinău, and finally slashed with a bayonet when he protested against the torturing of a Romanian officer. The most likely version is that he was captured and shot at Țiganca, in retaliation for the Romanians' treatment of Soviet prisoners.

An obituary by Comarnescu saw print in Revista Fundațiilor Regale, praising Bassarab as the "laborer-artist" who, in dying, lived up to his "heroic perspective on art": "it was given to him that he should accomplish more as a Romanian soldier than as an artist, his very sound debut notwithstanding." Bassarab's propaganda work was formally banned soon after Antonescu's downfall, as the new regime and the Allied Commission clamped down on all forms of fascist literature and art. His widow, who had a degree in philology, never remarried. She survived the rise and fall of Communist Romania and died in 1999 at age 95. Their son Șerban, born in 1940, pursued a career as a mathematician. His father's work was again explored after the Romanian Revolution of 1989. In 1999, Petre Oprea republished art chronicles by Bassarab, Stamatu and Zlotescu, noting that their aesthetic hierarchies were often confirmed by posterity.

== Selected works ==
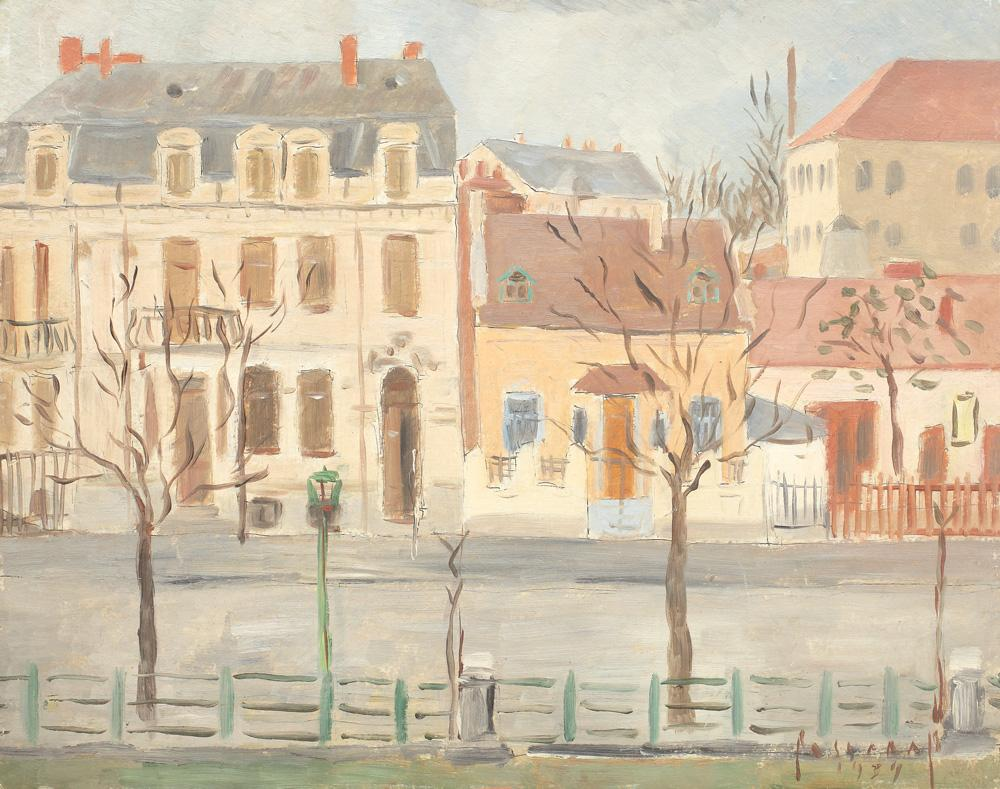
Primăvară pe cheiul Dâmboviței ("Spring on the Dâmbovița", 1934)

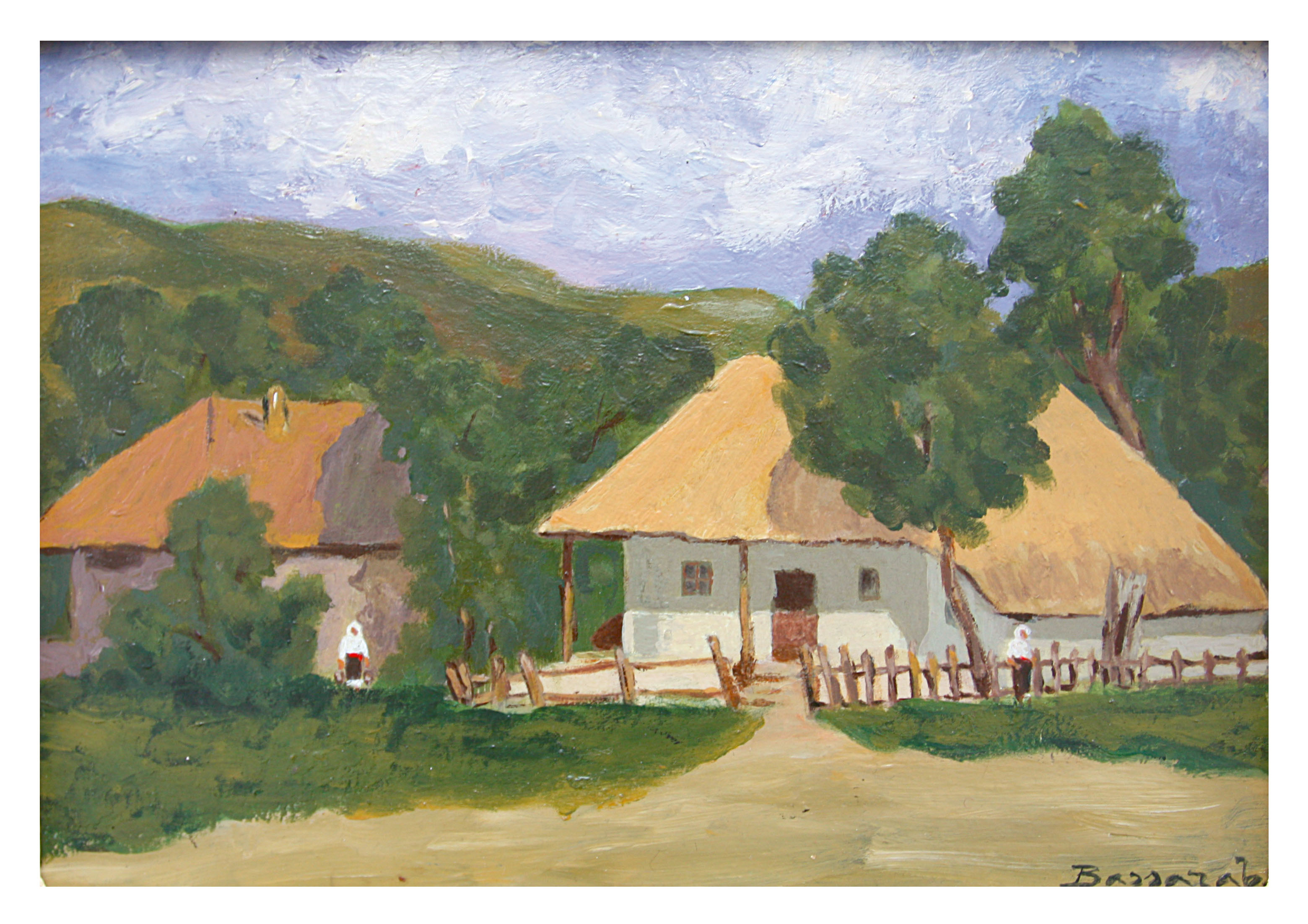
Case de țară ("Countryside Houses")

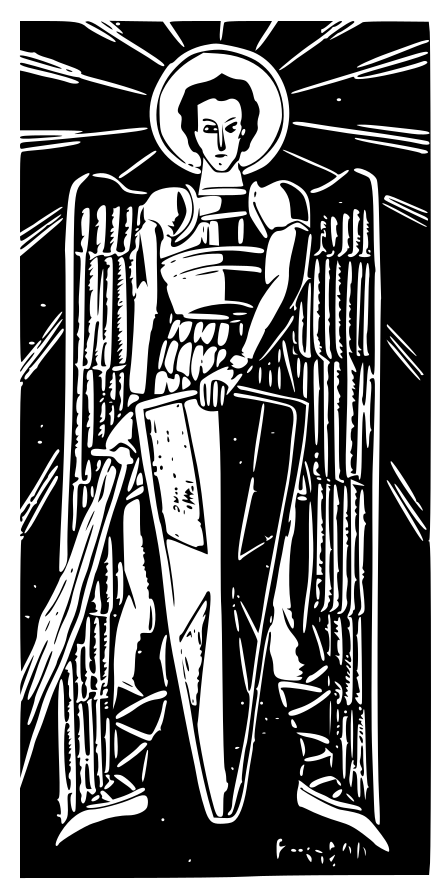
Arhanghel ("Archangel"), 1935

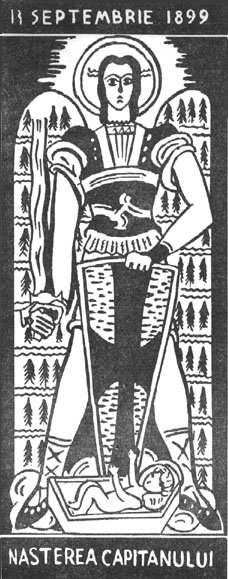
Nașterea Căpitanului ("Birth of the Captain")

Bălcescu

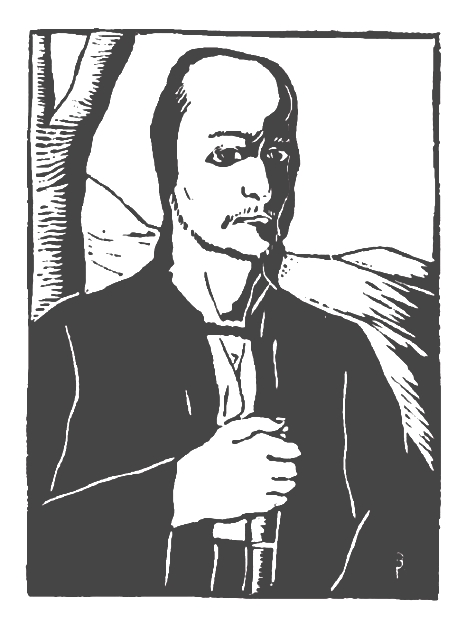
Horia

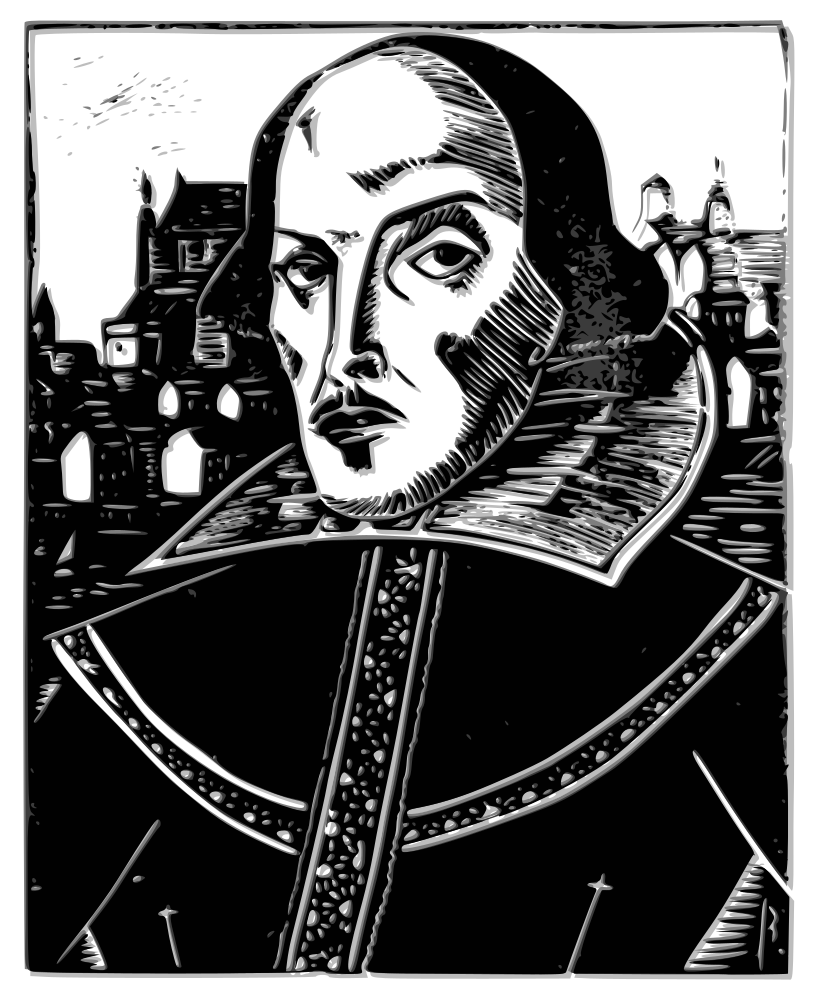
Shakespeare
