= Bilca =

- Commune
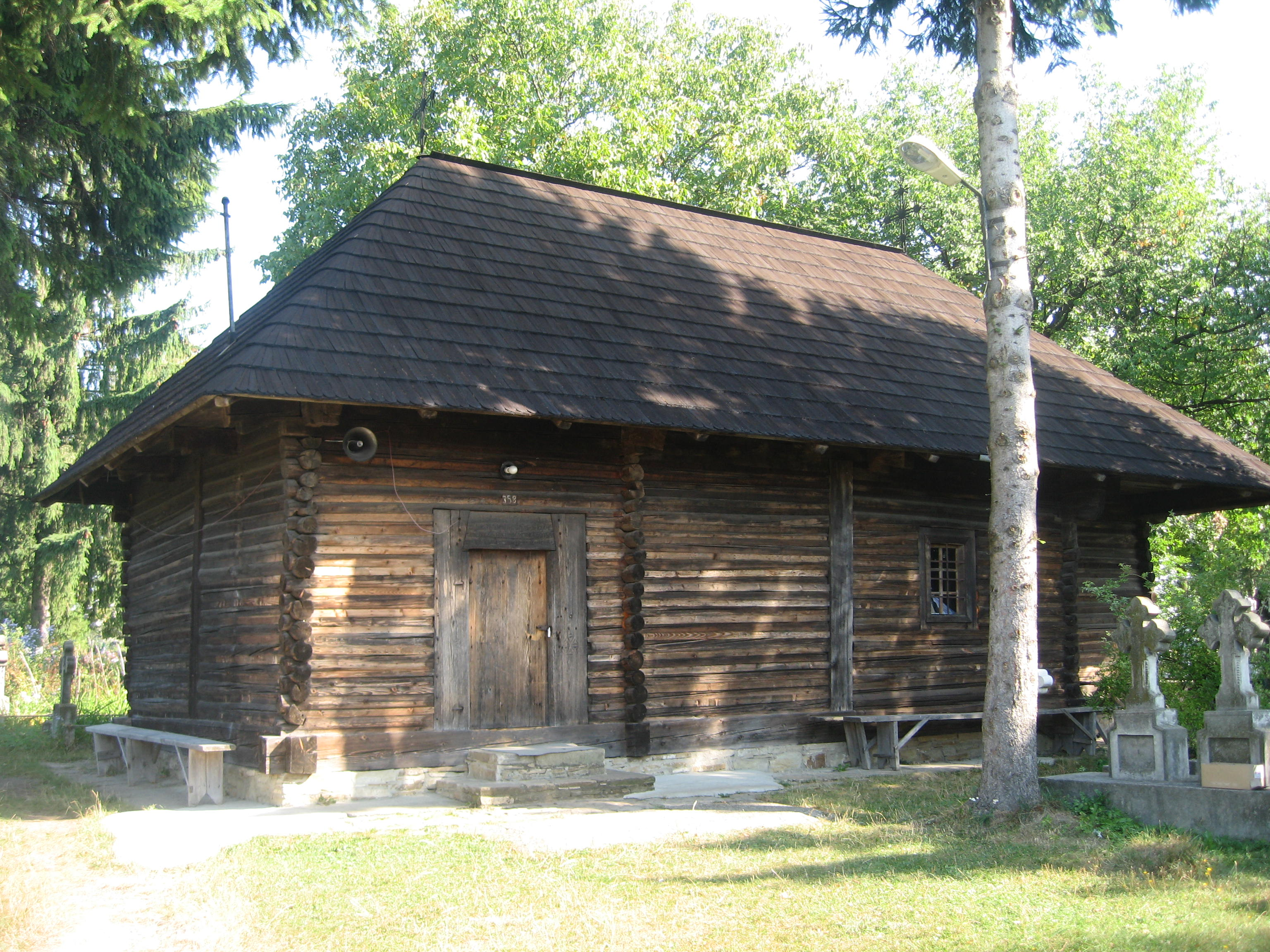
- Bilca wooden church

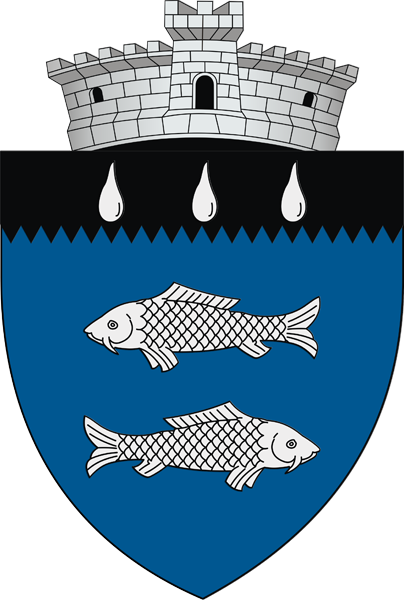
- Coat of arms

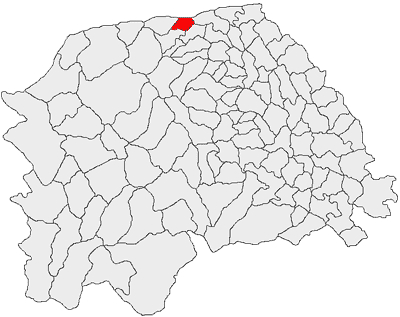
- Location in Suceava County

- Location in Romania
- Coordinates: 47°55′N 25°46′E
- Country: Romania
- County: Suceava

Government
  - Mayor (2020–2024): Zaharie Rusu (PNL)
- Area: 22 km^{2} (8.5 sq mi)
- Elevation: 408 m (1,339 ft)
- Population (2021-12-01): 3,930
  - Density: 180/km^{2} (460/sq mi)
- Time zone: UTC+02:00 (EET)
  - Summer (DST): UTC+03:00 (EEST)
- Postal code: 727100
- Area code: (+40) 02 30
- Vehicle reg.: SV
- Website: primaria-bilca.ro

Bilca (German: Bilka) is a commune located in Suceava County, Romania. It is composed of a single village, Bilca.

The commune is located in the northern extremity of the county, on the Romania–Ukraine border. It lies on the left bank of the Suceava River; its left tributary, the Bilca Mare (which forms part of the border with Ukraine), flows into the Suceava near the village of Bilca.

Bilca is crossed by national road DN2E, which starts in Grănicești, 31 km (19 mi) to the southeast, goes through the nearby city of Rădăuți, and ends in Putna, 17 km (11 mi) to the southwest. The county seat, Suceava, is located 53 km (33 mi) to the southeast.

The Bilca gas field is situated on the territory of the commune.

== Notable people ==
- Traian Brăileanu (1882 – 1947), sociologist and politician
- George Tofan (1880 – 1920), writer and journalist

== Gallery ==
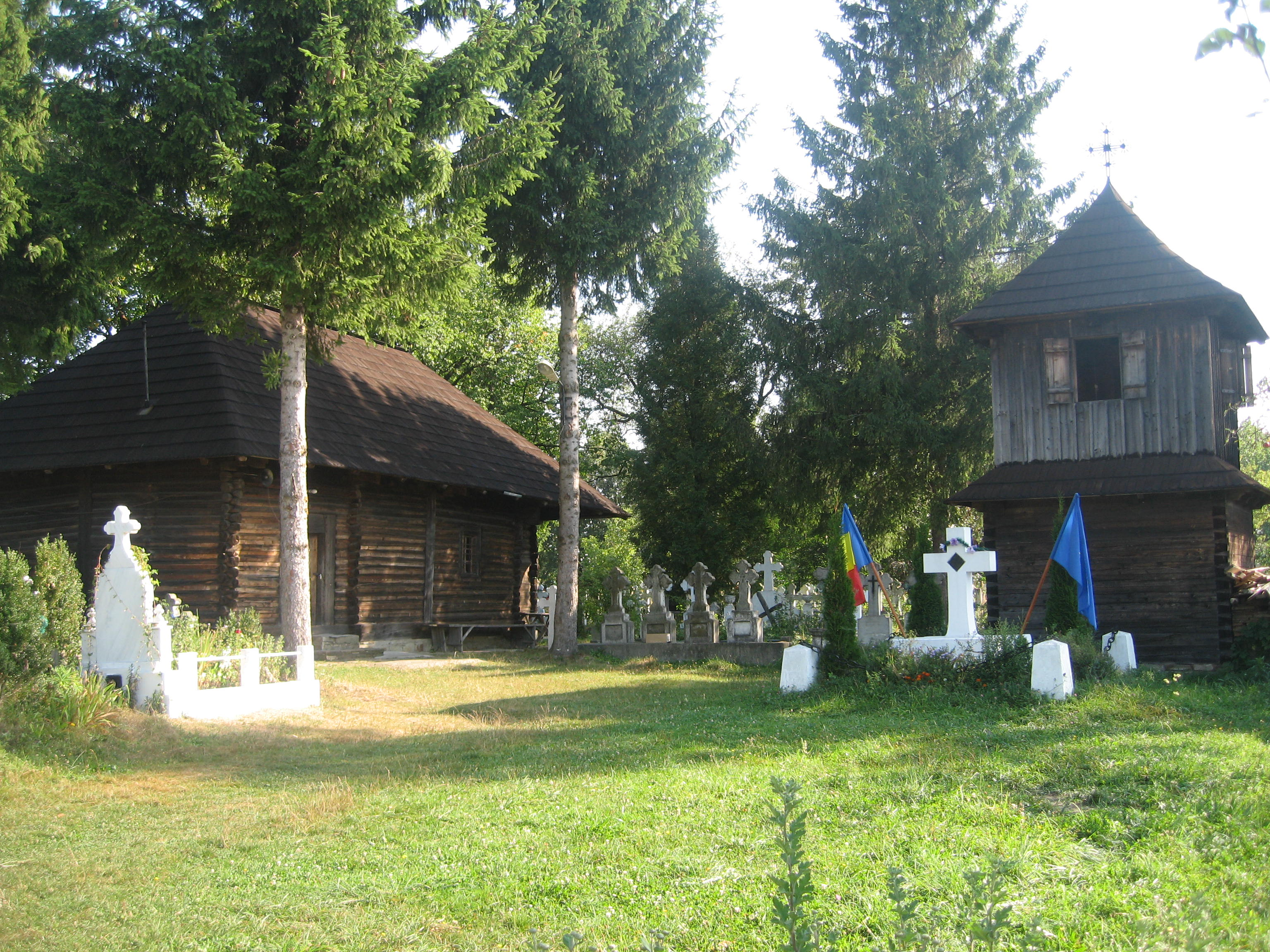
Bilca wooden church

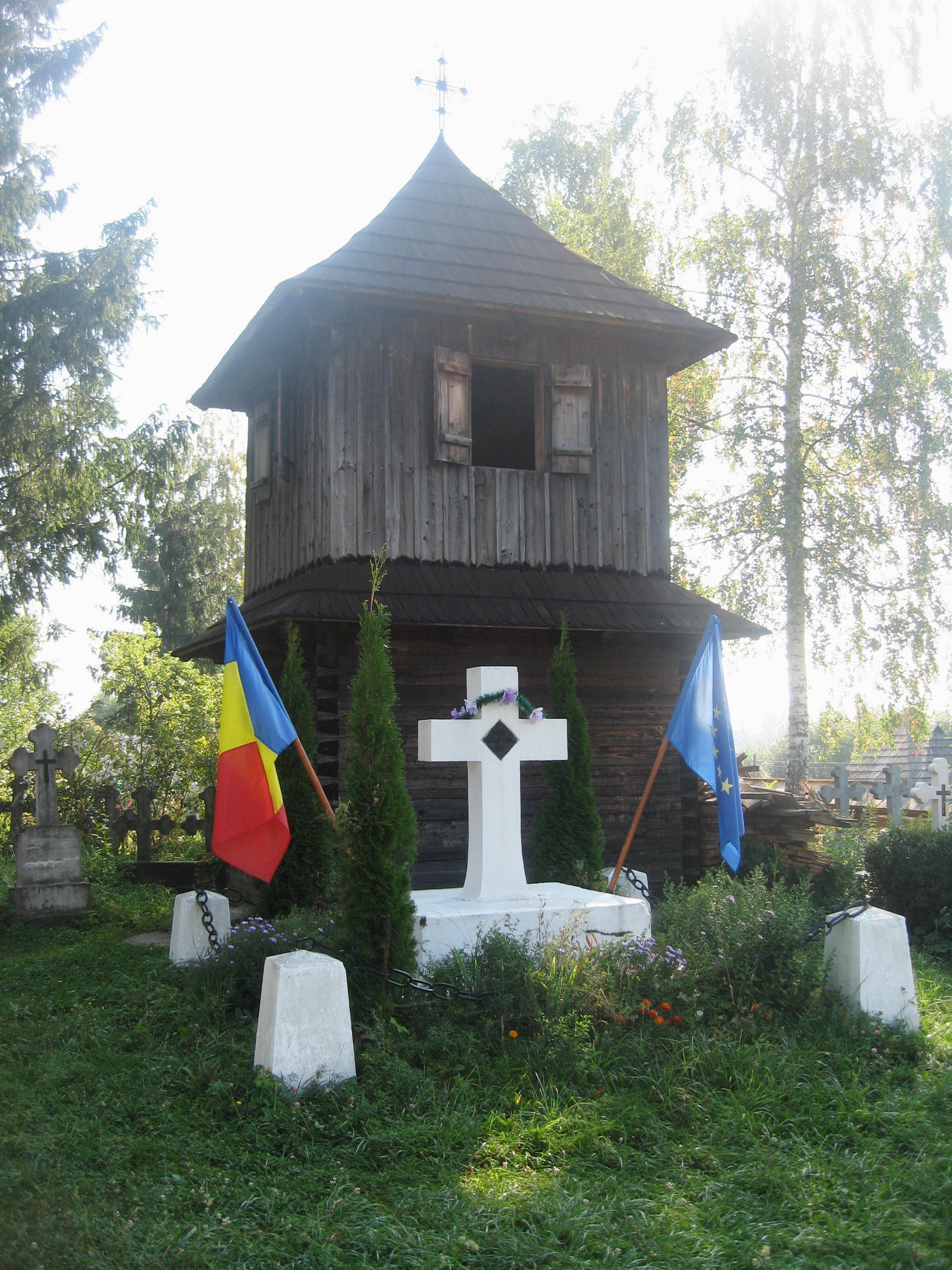
Wooden church

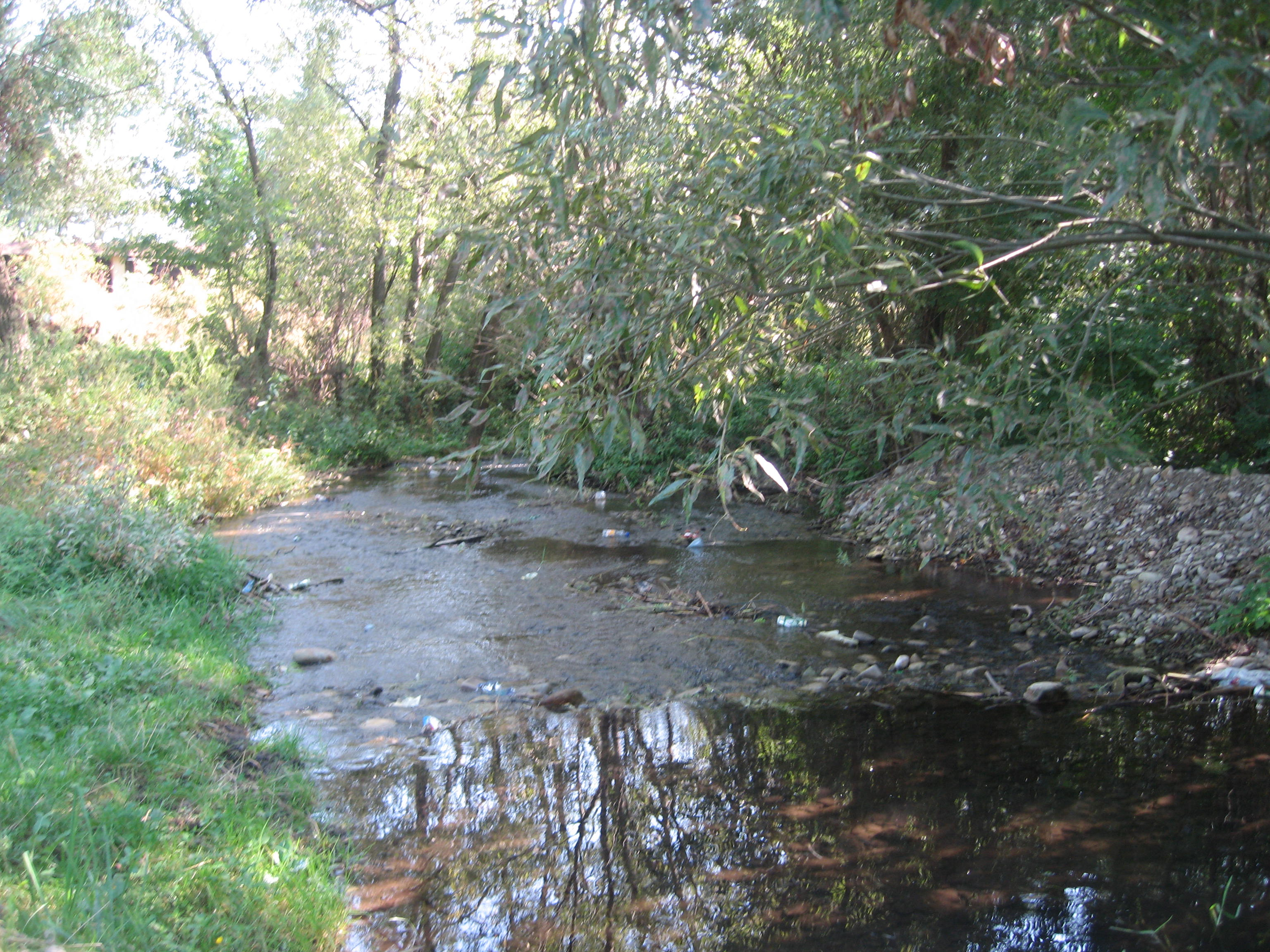
The river Bilca Mare
