= Școala =

Magazine

Şcoala
- Editor: George Tofan
- Categories: Pedagogy
- First issue: 1907
- Country: Austro Hungary
- Based in: Cernăuţi
- Language: Romanian

Şcoala (English: School) was a magazine from Czernowitz, Austria-Hungary, founded in 1907 by George Tofan.
