= Bilca Mare =

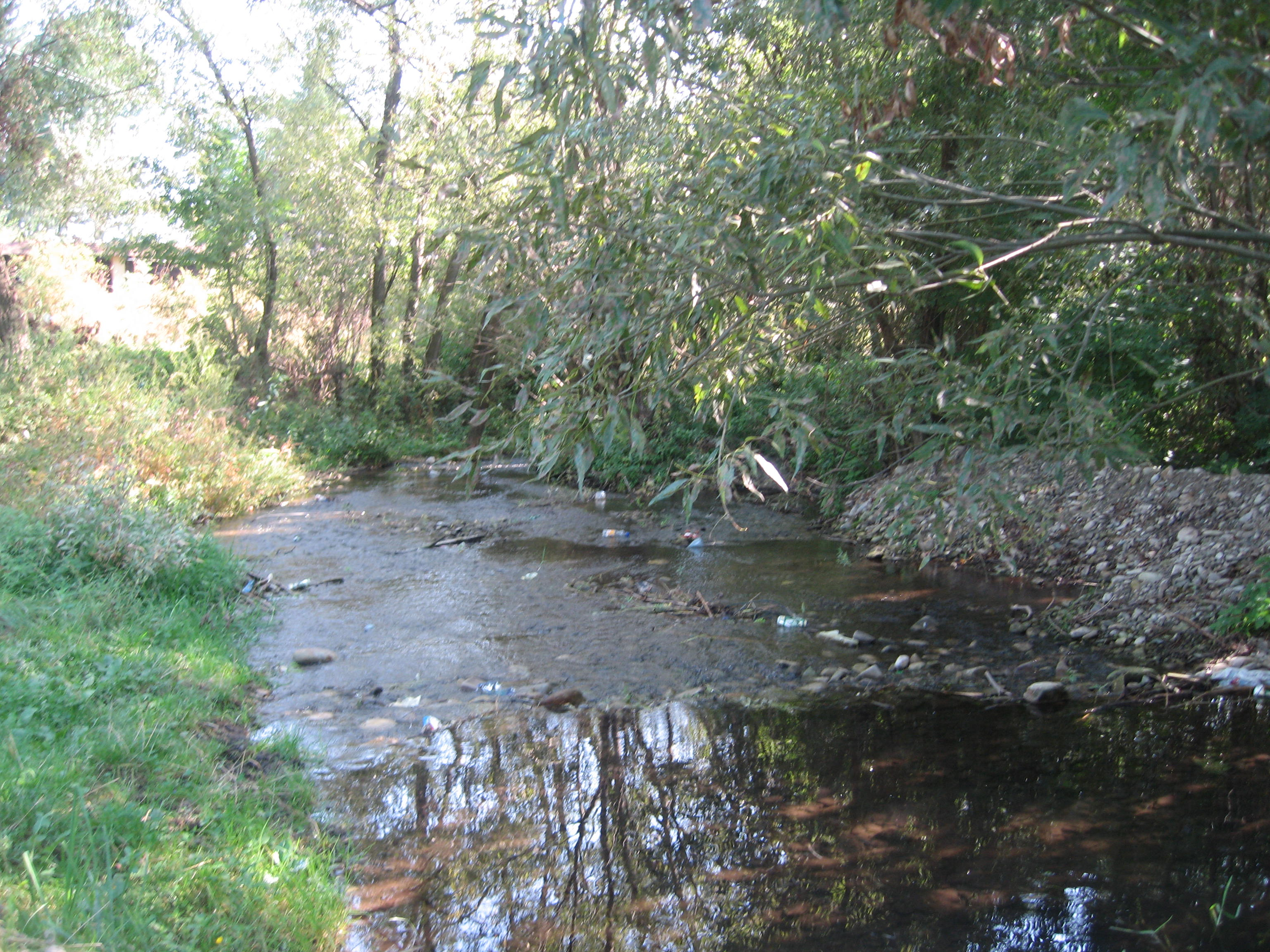

- Location within Romania

Location
- Country: Ukraine, Romania
- Oblasts: Chernivtsi Oblast
- Counties: Suceava County

Physical characteristics
- Mouth: Suceava
  - location: Bilca
  - coordinates: 47.9228°N 25.8242°E

Basin features
- Progression: Suceava→ Siret→ Danube→ Black Sea
- Tributaries
  - right: Bilca Mică

The Bilca Mare (also Bâlca Mare) is a left tributary of the Suceava River. Originating in Ukraine, the river crosses the border into Romania where it joins the Suceava near the village of Bilca. Within Romania, the Bilca Mare measures 7 km (4.3 mi) in length and has a drainage basin of 30 km^{2} (12 sq mi).
