= George Tofan =

Romanian writer (1880–1920)

- Born: 5 November [O.S. 17 November] 1880; Bilca, Austria-Hungary
- Died: 15 July 1920 (aged 39); Cernăuți, Kingdom of Romania
- Education: Chernowitz University
- Occupation: Teacher
- Known for: journalist
- Political party: National Moldavian Party

George Tofan (5 November [O.S. 17 November] 1880 – 15 July 1920) was a writer and official from Austro Hungary, the Moldavian Democratic Republic, and Romania. He was the editor in chief of Școala magazine (1907); also, George Tofan was a journalist and official in Chișinău.

== Biography ==
George Tofan was born on 5 November [O.S. 17 November] 1880, in Bilca (at the time in Austria-Hungary, now in Romania), studied in Suceava (1892–1900) and graduated from the Chernowitz University (1904). He contributed to Junimea literară (1904), Viața Românească (1906), Patria, and Foaia poporului (1909). On 31 January 1909 he became the president of the Teacher Training Resource Centre "George Tofan". Also, he was the secretary of "Societatea pentru Cultura și Literatura Română în Bucovina".

In 1914, Tofan was appointed as an inspector for the Romanian private schools and director of a school from Bazargic (today Dobrich). In 1917, together with Onisifor Ghibu, Tofan edited Școala Moldovenească in Chișinău; there he was a founder of the National Moldavian Party. On 6 November 1918 he was appointed as school inspector in Chișinău. In April 1919 Tofan was "Departamentul Instrucțiunii Publice din Bucovina" in Cernăuți, where he died a year later.

== Honours ==
- Teacher Training Resource Centre “George Tofan”, Suceava
- "George Tofan" Publishing House, Suceava

== Works ==
- "Avram Iancu, viața și activitatea lui", 1901
