= Romulus Cândea =

Romanian historian

Romulus Cândea (October 7, 1886 – January 27, 1973) was an Austro-Hungarian-born Romanian ecclesiastical historian.

== Biography ==
Born in Avrig, Szeben County, in the Transylvania region of Austria-Hungary, his father was a Romanian Orthodox priest. He studied at the German High School in Sibiu from 1897 to 1905, followed by the Theology Faculty at Czernowitz University in Bukovina from 1905 to 1909. The same institution granted him a doctorate in 1912, and he returned for a while to teach in Sibiu. He also continued to study history and philosophy at Leipzig University, earning a doctorate in philosophy and master's degree in fine arts there in 1916.

From March 1915 to October 1919, he taught church history and pedagogy at the theological seminary in Sibiu. By the time he left, Transylvania and Bukovina had united with Romania; from 1919 to 1922, he was a professor of general church history at his alma mater in what was now Cernăuți. Between 1922 and 1940, when the area was occupied by the Soviet Union, he was a professor within the department of medieval, modern, and contemporary world history within the Literature and Philosophy Faculty at Cernăuți. For the 1923-1924 academic year, he was dean of the faculty, while from 1925 to 1926, he was rector of the university. In 1921, Cândea was involved in a student-led campaign to fire two Jewish professors, including Eugen Ehrlich, and wrote an article denouncing the "ferocious pan-Germanism of a Jew".

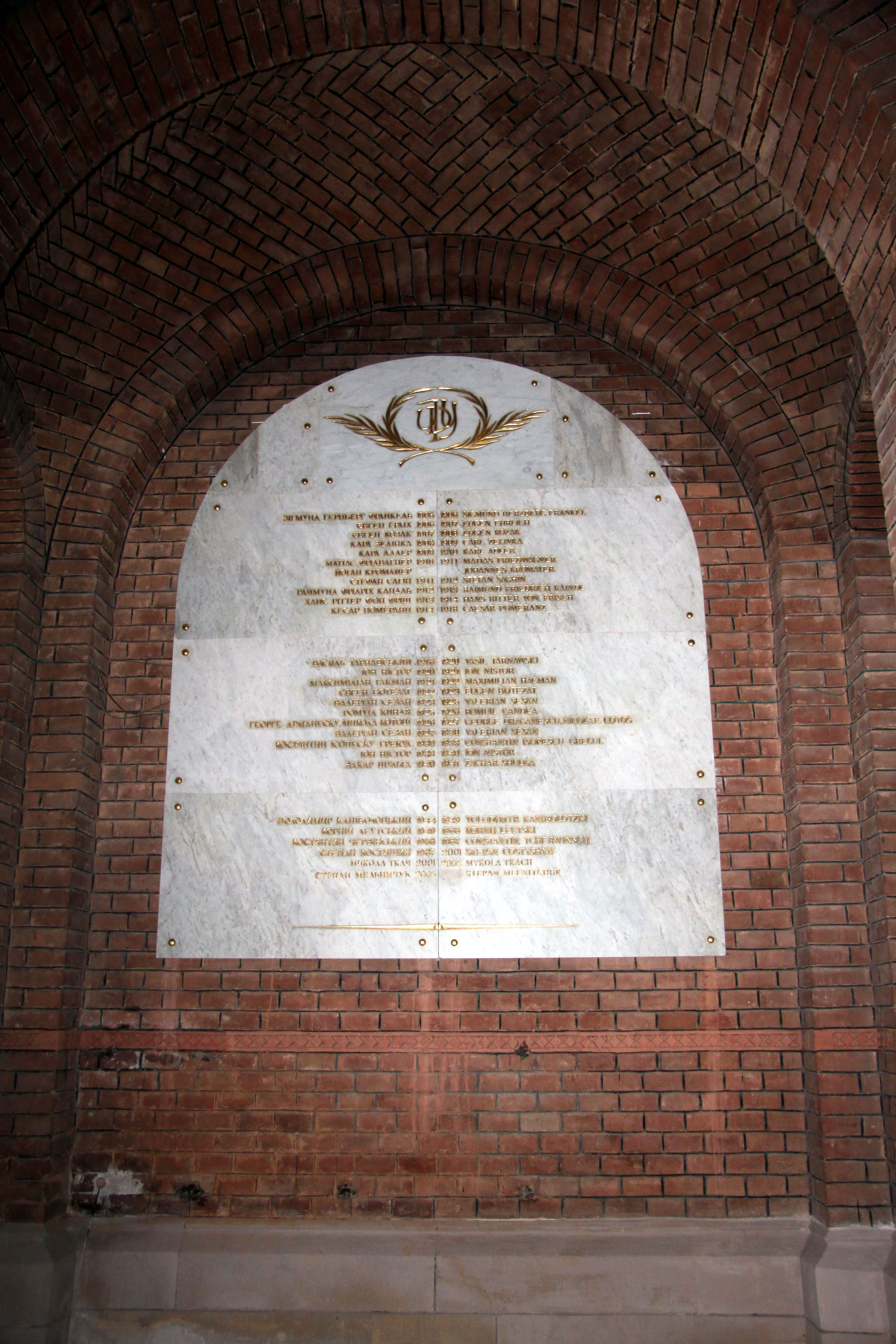
Plaque dedicated to the rectors of the University of Chernivtsi, also mentioning Romulus Cândea

In 1929, Cândea was elected a corresponding member of the Romanian Academy. He was a lay member both of the Cernăuți Archdiocese's assembly and of the national church congress. A friend and trusted advisor to Ion Nistor, his professional achievements, in the opinion of historian Lucian Nastasă, did not amount to much. He also had a parallel career in politics, serving as mayor of Cernăuți from 1927 to 1929. Within the Romanian Parliament, he represented his university both in the Assembly of Deputies and in the Senate in a number of legislatures. He was a prominent member of the quasi-fascist Romanian Front, elected on Pentecost 1935 as its regional leader for Bukovina.

Between 1940 and 1947, Cândea was a professor of world history within the Literature and Philosophy Faculty of Cluj University, which met at Sibiu for the first five years of that period, due to the Second Vienna Award. In 1948, the new communist regime stripped Cândea of his Academy membership.
