= St. Elijah–Gorgani Church =

Heritage site in Bucharest, Romania

Coordinates: 44°26′02″N 26°05′28″E

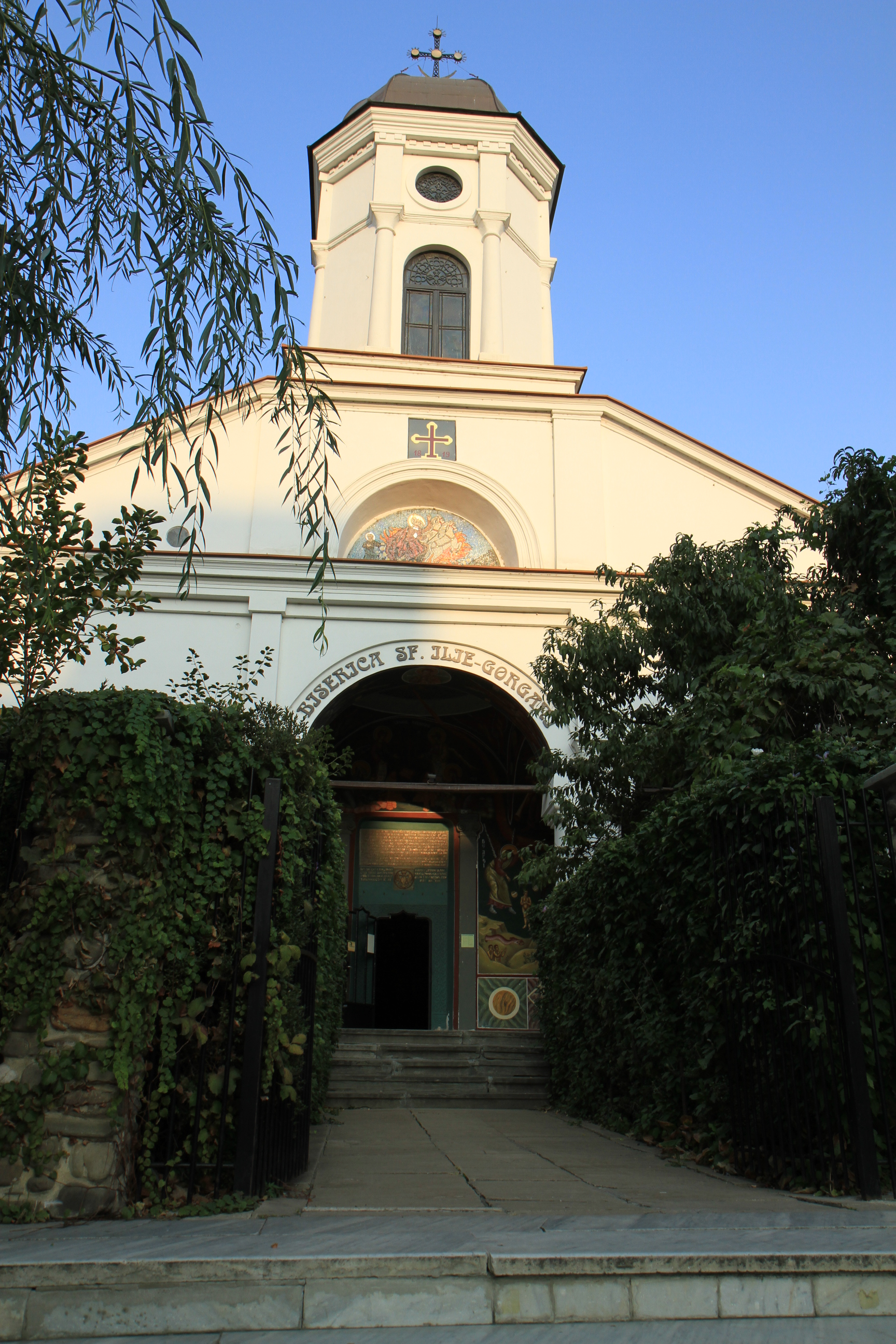
St. Elijah–Gorgani Church

St. Elijah–Gorgani Church (Romanian: Biserica Sfântul Ilie–Gorgani) is a Romanian Orthodox church located at 5 Silfidelor Street in Bucharest, Romania. It is dedicated to the Feast of the Annunciation and to the Prophet Elijah.

== History ==
Since the 17th century, a church has been located on a funerary mound or tumulus (gorgan) in what was then a poor district situated between the Dâmbovița River and the pond in what later became Cișmigiu Gardens. The oldest mention appears to occur in a 1639 deed issued by Matei Basarab. Some experts believe it was built by Șerban Cantacuzino (1678–1688), who made it a metochion of his Cotroceni Monastery, as noted in a 1693 document. At any rate, the church existed in 1694/95, when Constantin Brâncoveanu donated a bell. Contrary to some researchers, who cite Gheorghe Ionescu-Gion, the first church was not made of wood. Archaeological excavations undertaken in 1953 unearthed traces of the old church, including a thick layer (0.6–1 meter) of rubble, containing bits of plaster painted in fresco and glazed discs. Likewise, the razing and flattening of the mound was established by a thick segment of sand and gravel, left by the builders of the first masonry church. Records from before 1761, Ban Mihail Cantacuzino and an 1810 registry all mention a masonry structure. By the reign of Alexander Ypsilantis, the church was in bad shape. The walls collapsed during the 1802 earthquake, and it was demolished in 1813.

The church was rebuilt from the foundations, with massive walls, by former High Paharnici Manolache Hrisoscoleo and Ștefan Voinescu, former High Clucer Radu Voinescu and the cojoc (winter coat) makers’ guild. Completed in 1814, the gilding was finished in 1819, the date on the pisanie above the portico entrance door. Severely damaged by the 1838 earthquake, it was repaired, painted and the altar floored in 1862. Other repairs took place in 1880, 1886, and 1901. The portico was closed with windows for a time; a baldachin standing on two wooden poles existed in front until 1927. The narthex bell tower was redone in masonry in 1935. The imposing marble staircase, leading from the street to the church, dates to 1936. Both projects were undertaken by members of the Iron Guard, who started to attend services there around 1927.

In 1937, the church was the setting for the funerals of Ion Moța and Vasile Marin, two Iron Guard members who were killed in action in the Spanish Civil War. In 1940, it hosted the funeral and reburial ceremony for the movement’s founder, Corneliu Zelea Codreanu, and the Iron Guard death squad members who had been killed in prison. Another consolidation was undertaken after the 1977 earthquake. The initial painting was redone in tempera in 1913. Iron Guard affiliate and artist Alexandru Bassarab repainted the frescoes in 1936–1937, in Neo-Byzantine style with Romanian touches. His work was destroyed in 1982. Other artists then decorated the altar and upper nave (1982–1985) and narthex and lower altar (1991–1993).

== Description ==
The church is in a very unusual shape for Wallachia: a three-nave basilica with a central apse, flanked by smaller apses for the altar area. Together with the portico, the church measures 29 meters long by 13 meters wide. The central nave is wider than the side ones; all three are spanned by six bays. Two rows of large wooden columns covered in stucco support a vaulted ceiling above the main nave, while the sides have a flat ceiling. The entire ceiling is made of slatted wooden beams. A fragile wooden dome, covered in tin, rises above the center. The western facade features a large open portico with five front-facing arches in the middle, the central one being much larger than those on the side. These rest on cylindrical masonry columns. Above the portico and the profiled cornice, the facade terminates in a trapezoidal pediment, with a semicircular niche enclosing an icon of the patron saint.

A large octagonal bell tower on a square base rises above the center of the portico, parallel to the facade. The smaller of the bells is inscribed in Romanian Cyrillic and dated 1777; the larger, cast in 1834, is in Polish. The side facades feature a series of pilasters in powerful relief. The entrance portal is artistically carved in stone, with post-Brâncovenesc motifs. The southern nave holds six graves from 1814-1834, carved in Cyrillic and Greek. There is seating along the edges and around the central columns. Above the altar table, there is a richly carved baldachin held up by four small pillars. The iconostasis, painted at Mount Athos, extends along the entire width. It has ten large icons, five of which were coated in silver between 1838 and 1897, inscribed in Greek with the artists’ names. The princely throne, ambon and two candelabra are valuable as art, as is the icon of Elijah to the right of the entrance. The church owns relics of Saint Anthony the Great.

The parish house, located to the northwest on the same mound, dates to 1936. A military jail was situated behind the altar apse from 1835 to 1848; Nicolae Bălcescu and Grigore Alexandrescu were held there in 1841. The church is listed as a historic monument by Romania's Ministry of Culture and Religious Affairs.
