= Haig Acterian =

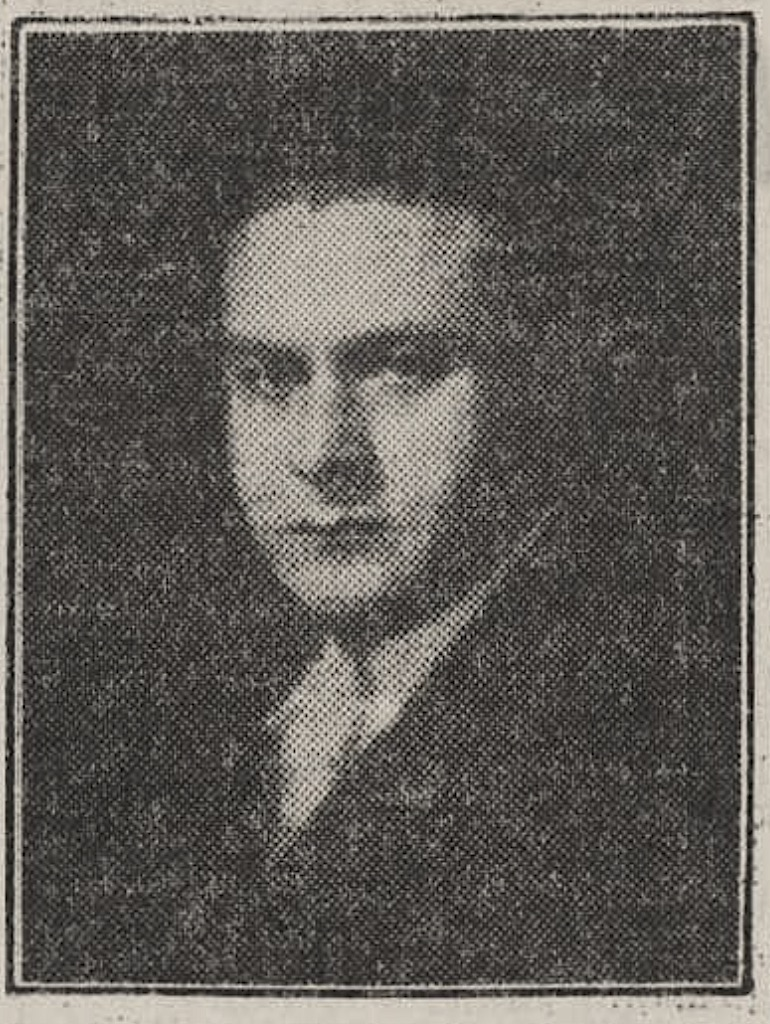
- Acterian in 1936.
- Born: Haig Garabet Acterian; March 5, 1904; Constanța, Kingdom of Romania
- Died: August 8, 1943 (aged 39); Kuban, Soviet Union
- Cause of death: Killed in action
- Education: Caragiale National University of Theatre and Film
- Occupations: Film director, Theater director, Critic, Dramatist, Poet, Journalist, Political activist
- Employer: National Theatre Bucharest
- Spouse: Marietta Sadova
- Relatives: Arșavir Acterian, Jeni Acterian

Haig Acterian (Romanian: [haˈiɡ akteriˈan]; also known under his pen name Mihail [mihaˈil]; March 5, 1904 – August 8, 1943) was a Romanian film and theater director, critic, dramatist, poet, journalist, and fascist political activist. Alongside Mihail Sebastian and Camil Petrescu, he is considered one of the major Romanian theater chroniclers in the interwar period.

Acterian was also noted for his friendships with the writer and historian of religions Mircea Eliade, the philosopher Petre Țuțea, and the British dramatist Edward Gordon Craig. He was married to actress Marietta Sadova (who had earlier been the wife of Ion Marin Sadoveanu).

== Biography ==
Born in Constanța to an Armenian-Romanian family, he was the brother of Arșavir Acterian and Jeni Acterian. Haig studied at the Mircea cel Bătrân High School in his native city, then attended the Spiru Haret National College in Bucharest. He made his literary debut in the school magazine, Vlăstare, with pieces which caught the attention of his colleague, Mircea Eliade. Acterian befriended Eliade during their school years. It was also then that he has included him as a character in Eliade's debut work, the Novel of the Nearsighted Adolescent. After his stay in British India, Eliade dedicated his novella, Isabel and the Devil's Waters, "To my friend Mihail and the blind woman Lalu" — Lalu being one of Eliade's acquaintances from Calcutta.

Upon graduation, Acterian enrolled at both the University of Bucharest, Faculty of Philosophy, and the Conservatory of Dramatic Art, where he studied drama and comedy under Lucia Sturdza-Bulandra. He completed courses at the Conservatory in 1926, and made his debut in poetry, in 1929, with a selection titled Agonia ("Agony"). Acterian also completed work on a short play, Dialog între închipuiri ("Dialog between Apparitions"), in which he reinterpreted the Meșterul Manole legend, one of the central pieces in Romanian mythology, from a Christian perspective.

In 1930, Acterian traveled to Berlin, where he closely followed developments in German theater, and came to admire the achievements of the locals Max Reinhardt, Heinz Hilpert, Erwin Piscator, Karlheinz Martin, as well as those of Soviet director Vsevolod Meyerhold. Upon his return, he staged R. C. Sherriff's Journey's End (translated into Romanian as Călătoria din urmă), receiving critical acclaim. Among others, it starred Tony Bulandra. Soon after, Acterian began contributing to Vremea magazine, where he wrote his first portrait pieces of modern theater directors and actors, and held a conference on Romanian theater (for a foundation sponsored by King Carol II).

Between 1932 and 1934, Haig Acterian was scenic director for the Bucharest-based Ventura Theater. He was by then heavily influenced by the classical works of William Shakespeare and Aeschylus, but practical constraints prevented him from staging them. He directed a series of other plays, including one by George Bernard Shaw. Around that time, he became good friends with Petre Țuțea, who was taking an interest in the world of theater.

Initially a communist (like Mihail Polihroniade), Acterian contributed articles to Bluze Albastre (a literary magazine published in 1932, with backing from the Romanian Communist Party). He affiliated with Amicii URSS ("Friends of the Soviet Union"), a loose grouping of left-wing intellectuals which was created and disbanded in 1934. Later the same year, he traveled to Italy, and trained in filmmaking at the Cinecittà in Rome. Acterian took part in the 1934 Volta Congress on dramatic theater, and reported on it for Vremea. Over the following year, he traveled to France and Switzerland, briefly residing in Paris and Geneva; this sojourn was the topic of a diary, published later.

With Eliade and others, Acterian was a founding member of the Criterion literary society. Rejecting his early political ideas, he soon became a disciple of Nae Ionescu and Trăirism, and later a supporter of the far right Iron Guard movement.

In 1936, Acterian completed his Pretexte pentru o dramaturgie românească ("Themes for a Romanian Dramaturgy"), with a preface by his friend Edward Gordon Craig, and published a volume of poetry, titled Urmare ("Follow-up"). The following year, he completed a lengthy essay, published under the title Orientarea Teatrului ("The Direction of the Theater"). He also wrote several works on the first Romanian monograph on Shakespeare (1938), and an essay titled Limitele Artei ("The Limits of Art", 1939). Also in 1939, Acterian produced and directed two documentary films: one on the Bucharest industrial plant of Nicolae Malaxa (Fabrica Malaxa), and the other on the Apuseni Mountains (Munții Apuseni).

As a journalist, Acterian contributed propaganda for the 1940 Iron Guard government, the National Legionary State, and served as head of the National Theatre Bucharest. In this capacity, he founded, together with George Franga, the National Theater's Museum. In February, he also organized the premiere of Iphigenia, a play by his friend Eliade, who was at a time living in London.

Haig Acterian was arrested when the Guard violently clashed with Ion Antonescu's forces in January 1941 (see Legionnaires' Rebellion and Bucharest Pogrom), and detained until after Operation Barbarossa (the German invasion of the Soviet Union, to which Romania contributed as an Axis country; see Romania during World War II). Acterian, like other prisoners, was offered the choice of remaining in prison or joining the war effort as a soldier on the Eastern Front; he was declared missing during battles in the Kuban (see Kuban bridgehead), and was probably killed at that time.

== Legacy ==
Despite the short period of time covered by his activities, Acterian has been hailed as an innovative director and author. Taking in view his many interests, as well as his "technical expertise and spiritual synthesis", Eliade defined him as a "Renaissance man". Writing in 1989, literary critic Constantin Măciucă deplored Acterian's political choices and his "occasional negative generalizations", but noted his merits in supporting a national specificity in Romanian dramaturgy.

In a 1945 letter to literary historian Tudor Vianu, harshly critical of his generation's political choices, playwright Eugène Ionesco, who had witnessed first-hand the impact fascism had on his generation, blamed Acterian and Polihroniade's deaths on the original influence exercised over them by Nae Ionescu. The self-exiled Eliade remembered Acterian and Mihail Sebastian in a 1951 essay, which offered praise to both of them.

Haig's diary, Cealaltă parte a vieții noastre ("The Other Side of Our Lives"), was published in 1989 by Arșavir Acterian. His frontline letters to Marietta Sadova are kept at the National Archives of Romania.
