= Isopescu =

Isopescu is a Romanian surname. Notable people with the surname include:

- Claudiu Isopescu (1894–1956)
- Dimitrie Isopescu (1839–1901)
- Modest Isopescu (1895–1948)
- Constantin Isopescu-Grecul (1871–1938)
