= George Popovici =

Romanian jurist and politician

George Popovici (German: Georg Popovici; November 20 [O.S. November 8] 1863 – July 11/12, 1905) was an Austro-Hungarian and Romanian agrarian politician, jurist and poet. He took to politics as a youth, participating in the nationalist movement as a member of Societatea Academică Junimea and Concordia Society. He won a seat in the Austrian House of Deputies in 1897, and, during his mandate, co-founded the Romanian National People's Party, which he also represented in the Diet of Bukovina. Popovici and Iancu Flondor led the party's autonomist wing, which rejected compromise with the Austrian administration and demanded national rights for the Romanian Bukovinians.

Popovici lost the parliamentary election of 1900, during which time he ran into heavy debt. He left for the Kingdom of Romania, renouncing Austrian citizenship and focusing on his career as a historian of law. He eventually committed suicide at Munkács, which was at the time part of Hungarian Transleithania.

== Biography ==
=== Early life ===
Born in Czernowitz (Cernăuți), in Austrian-ruled Duchy of Bukovina, his parents were the Romanian Orthodox priest Eusebiu Popovici (1838–1922) and his wife Elena Hacman. Eusebiu's father Constantin (1807–1890), himself a parish priest, had served in the Diet in 1861; his uncle, Constantin Clement Popovici, a church historian, also had a career in politics. Eusebiu himself was recognized for his work as an antiquarian, librarian, and theologian. Eusebie had embraced Romanian nationalism from the 1870s, against the conservatism of the boyar class; George radicalize himself even further, by introducing social demands into the nationalist program and seeking direct backing from the peasants.

George entered a local primary school in 1870, followed by the German high school four years later. He graduated in 1882, immediately joining Societatea Academică Junimea, the Romanian cultural club. That autumn, he entered the law faculty of Czernowitz University. Rising from secretary to president of Junimea for the 1883–1884 year, he was part of a quartet that organized a ten-year celebration of Arboroasa in 1885. During his university years, he published historical studies and poetry both in the Czernowitz-based Candela and in Convorbiri Literare and Sămănătorul, from the Kingdom of Romania. In the summer of 1885, he took part in maneuvers at Stanislau with the Austro-Hungarian Army. He graduated university in 1888; the same year, he left to continue his studies at the University of Innsbruck, but a serious illness prevented this for nearly two years. Popovici earned his doctorate in 1894.

In 1897, he returned to Czernowitz, after a study trip to Vienna, in order to campaign for a seat in the Austrian House of Deputies at the March election, joining the Concordia Society (or National Romanian Party, PNR) of Ioan Zotta and Modest Grigorcea. He won the seat with 597 of 625 votes cast, and represented the southern portion of Bukovina: Storojineț, Siret, Rădăuți, Suceava, Gura Humorului and Câmpulung Moldovenesc. He ran on an agrarian-focused platform, declaring: "All the lands of our empire, and of other empires as well, are marching toward economic betterment while us Bukovinians have lagged behind, so therefore I promise to do everything necessary to mend the economic state of our Bukovinian peasant." During that stage of his career, Popovici also believed that all Romanian provinces would be united under Austrian rule.

Dissatisfied with the conservative Concordia, in April 1897 Popovici entered the Romanian National People's Party (PNPR), a more radical nationalist group whose ideologue was Iancu Flondor. He served on its leadership board, with, among others, Grigorcea, Eudoxiu Hurmuzachi, Varteres von Prunkul, Ion Țurcan, and his uncle C. C. Popovici. Later, he and Graf Wassilko where co-opted on the Party Directorate; Popovici also served on the electoral board of Czernowitz. Eusebie Popovici also joined the new group, and, in 1898, became a member of its electoral board in Suceava.

In autumn 1897, Popovici proposed before parliament the establishment of an appeals court for Bukovina, and participated in a peasants' assembly at Vienna that gathered together representatives of the empire's rural Romanian population. In March 1898, he delivered a speech in parliament where he called for the rights of the peasantry to be respected in the matter of land rents. He was the party rapporteur on the issue of regional autonomy, which the PNPR supported as part of a right-wing coalition in the House, against the objections of German nationalists. Also in 1898, after a heated campaign with accusations of fraud against his competitors, he won a seat in the Diet for the rural constituency of Câmpulung Moldovenesc. When not engaged in political campaigning, he submitted entries on old Romanian law to Enciclopedia română, which appeared that same year. Meanwhile, his fiancée Virginia, the daughter of cultural figure Dionisie Bejan, died.

=== Conflicts, departure, death ===
In May 1899, Popovici held a passionate speech before a join session of imperial legislators held in Budapest, calling on Romania to join the Triple Alliance and warning of the threat posed by the Russian Empire. In the spring of 1899, he signed his name to a formal protest against the Bourguignon von Baumberg, the Bukovina Governor, accusing him of being anti-Romanian and of censoring the local nationalist press. He also stood up against the governor's ban on public displays of the Romanian tricolor, arguing that the colors were naturally found on Romanian folk costumes, which would risk being banned. This was followed in September by another protest, prompted by Bourguignon's conflict with the Orthodox clergy, including his own father. By 1900, Popovici had stopped participating in sessions of the Diet, in protest at the older Bukovina Romanian politicians' policy of concessions and patience with the Austrian authorities. The PPNR split into factions, but the core group, steered by Flondor and Popovici, endured, hoping to rely on renewed support from the Romanian peasantry.

In August, he became president of the reconstructed PNPR. In summer 1900, he ran for re-election to the Vienna parliament, but lost to an accommodationist candidate, Dimitrie Isopescu. Beset by campaign debts, Popovici left Austrian territory settled in Bucharest, capital of the Kingdom of Romania. He refused to run again for a vacated seat the House, citing "personal reasons"; his absence cleared the way for Tudor Flondor, who was Iancu's brother and political rival. In the spring of 1901, at Bucharest, Popovici married Maria, the daughter of politician Ștefan C. Șendrea.

Popovici renounced Austrian citizenship upon emigrating, and was naturalized a Romanian citizen in February 1902. He continued to publish studies in 1903, gave lectures at the Romanian Atheneum, and in 1904 submitted material on Romanian diplomacy to Enciclopedia română. He was working on a large-scale volume dealing with the history of Romanian law, but never finished it; instead, he helped his fellow nationalist historian, Nicolae Iorga, reviewing for print his texts in German. Popovici was elected a corresponding member of the Romanian Academy in April 1905. However, he was blocked in his bid for the chair of Romanian law at the University of Bucharest, after conservative Bukovinians launched a press campaign against him. According to Iorga: "A Bukovinian made a fuss in the papers, in the newspaper Conservatorul, spewing insults at this correct, modest and delicate man, this man who had never insulted anyone; a veritable camp emerged at the Faculty to block his entry. We know how much that insult hurt him, how he knew who the perpetrator was, and how, knowing this, he knew that he could expect no vindication [of his honor] from him".

Reportedly, the peasants of Bukovina continued to hold Popovici in high esteem, and kept copies of his portrait. By then, Iancu Flondor had replaced him as president of the PNPR. Flondor was accused by adversary Aurel Onciul of the Democratic Peasants' Party of having plagiarized his friend's projects for electoral reform; Onciul also claimed that Popovici had only stayed by Flondor's side because he was being paid to.

That July, some time after visiting Iorga in Bucharest, Popovici left for Hungary. He was reportedly ashamed by prospects of insolvency and one night, while at an inn in Munkács, took a lethal dose of morphine. A letter and six telegrams were found in his room. The letter was addressed to the town's administrator, while the telegrams were for family members, a friend and the prefect of the Bucharest police. He left no indication of why he committed suicide, instead giving instructions as to his burial. Popovici was buried in his native city.

In his Sămănătorul obituary, Iorga argued: "Among those who were brought down by our sins, among those who were murdered by the stupidity and wickedness of this nation, I know none for whom more tears should be spilled. He was of pure gold, blocking the path of those who, with lead as their ornament, have trampled on him." A posthumous volume of poetry was published in 1908 by Ștefan Octavian Iosif, with a preface by Iorga. These and other works appeared under the pen name T. Robeanu; the moniker originated with an 1885 pun addressed to his then-fiancée: Te robea, nu? ("He enslaved you, no?").
