= Teodor V. Ștefanelli =

Imperial Austrian-born Romanian historian, writer and lawyer (1849–1920)

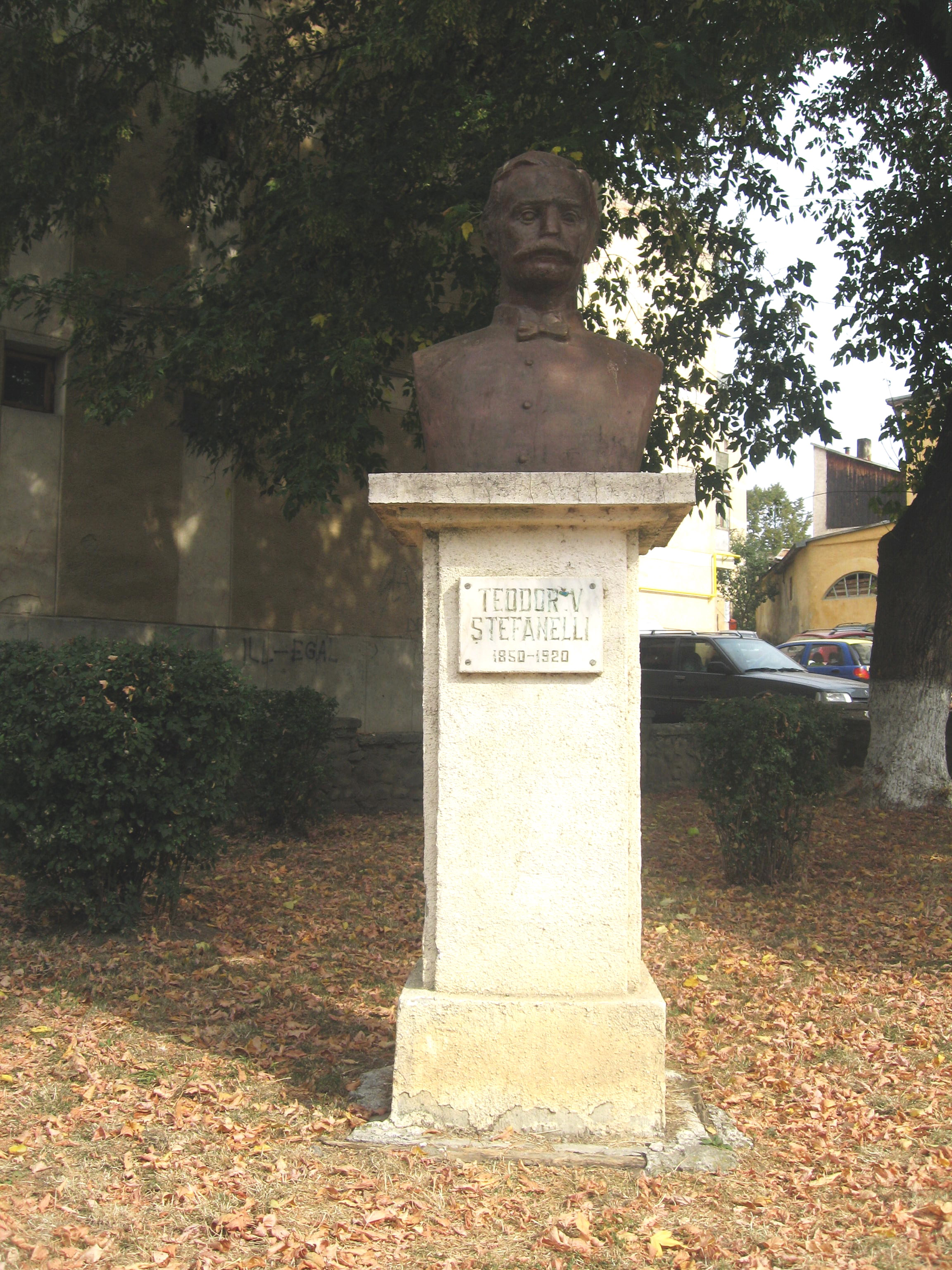
Bust in Siret

Teodor V. Ștefanelli (born Teodor Ștefaniuc; 18 August 1849 – 23 July 1920) was an Imperial Austrian-born Romanian historian, poet, prose writer and lawyer.

Born in Siret, part of Bukovina, his father Vasile Ștefaniuc was a tradesman and merchant. After attending primary school in his native town, he went to high school in Czernowitz (Cernăuți) from 1861 to 1869, and was classmates with Mihai Eminescu during his second year. From 1869 to 1873, he studied law at the University of Vienna, which awarded him a doctorate in 1875. He worked as a magistrate and administrator in Câmpulung Moldovenesc, Suceava and Lviv; by the time of his retirement in 1910, he was an imperial adviser at the Supreme Court in Vienna. A deputy in the Diet of Bukovina for the National Romanian Party, he actively participated in the province's union with Romania in 1918. He died in Fălticeni. Ștefanelli belonged to România Jună society in Vienna, and as such was among the organizers of the festivities at Putna Monastery in 1871. In Czernowitz, was part of the Society for Romanian Culture and Literature in Bukovina, as well as Arboroasa and Societatea Academică Junimea. As a member of the Romanian School Society of Suceava, he founded a library. In 1898, he was elected a corresponding member of the Romanian Academy, rising to titular status in 1910.

His first published work was a translation that applied in Foaia Societății pentru Cultura și Literatura Română in 1868. His contributions also appeared in Analele Academiei Române, Arhiva, Aurora română, Calendariul Societății pentru Cultura și Literatura Română, Convorbiri Literare, Gazeta Bucovinei, Junimea literară, Revista politică, Transilvania and Tribuna. He signed his early work T. Șt., T. V. Ștefaniu, Truță and T. V. Șt. Most of Ștefanelli's work remains uncollected in periodicals. He published the following in book form: the adapted story Loango (1886), the history texts Istoricul luptei pentru drept în ținutul Câmpulungului Moldovenesc (1911) and Documente din vechiul ocol al Câmpulungului Moldovenesc (1915), and Amintiri despre Eminescu (1914).
