= Bălăceana =

- Commune
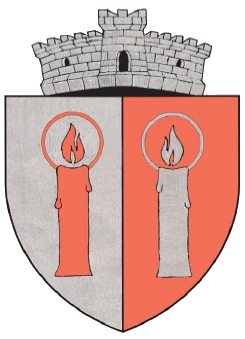
- Coat of arms

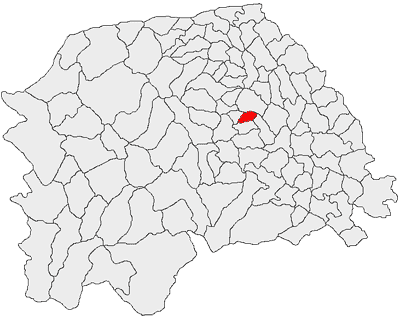
- Location in Suceava County

- Location in Romania
- Coordinates: 47°38′35″N 26°2′18″E
- Country: Romania
- County: Suceava

Government
  - Mayor (2024–2028): Constantin-Octavian Cojocariu (PSD)
- Area: 28 km^{2} (11 sq mi)
- Elevation: 386 m (1,266 ft)
- Population (2021-12-01): 1,342
  - Density: 48/km^{2} (120/sq mi)
- Time zone: EET/EEST (UTC+2/+3)
- Postal code: 727126
- Area code: +40 x30
- Vehicle reg.: SV
- Website: comunabalaceana.ro

Bălăceana (German: Balaczana) is a commune located in Suceava County, Bukovina, northeastern Romania. It is composed of a single village, namely Bălăceana. This was part of Ilișești (German: Illischestie) commune (theretofore called Ciprian Porumbescu) until 2004, when it was split off, along with Ciprian Porumbescu village; both formed separate communes.
