= Frătăuții Vechi =

- Commune
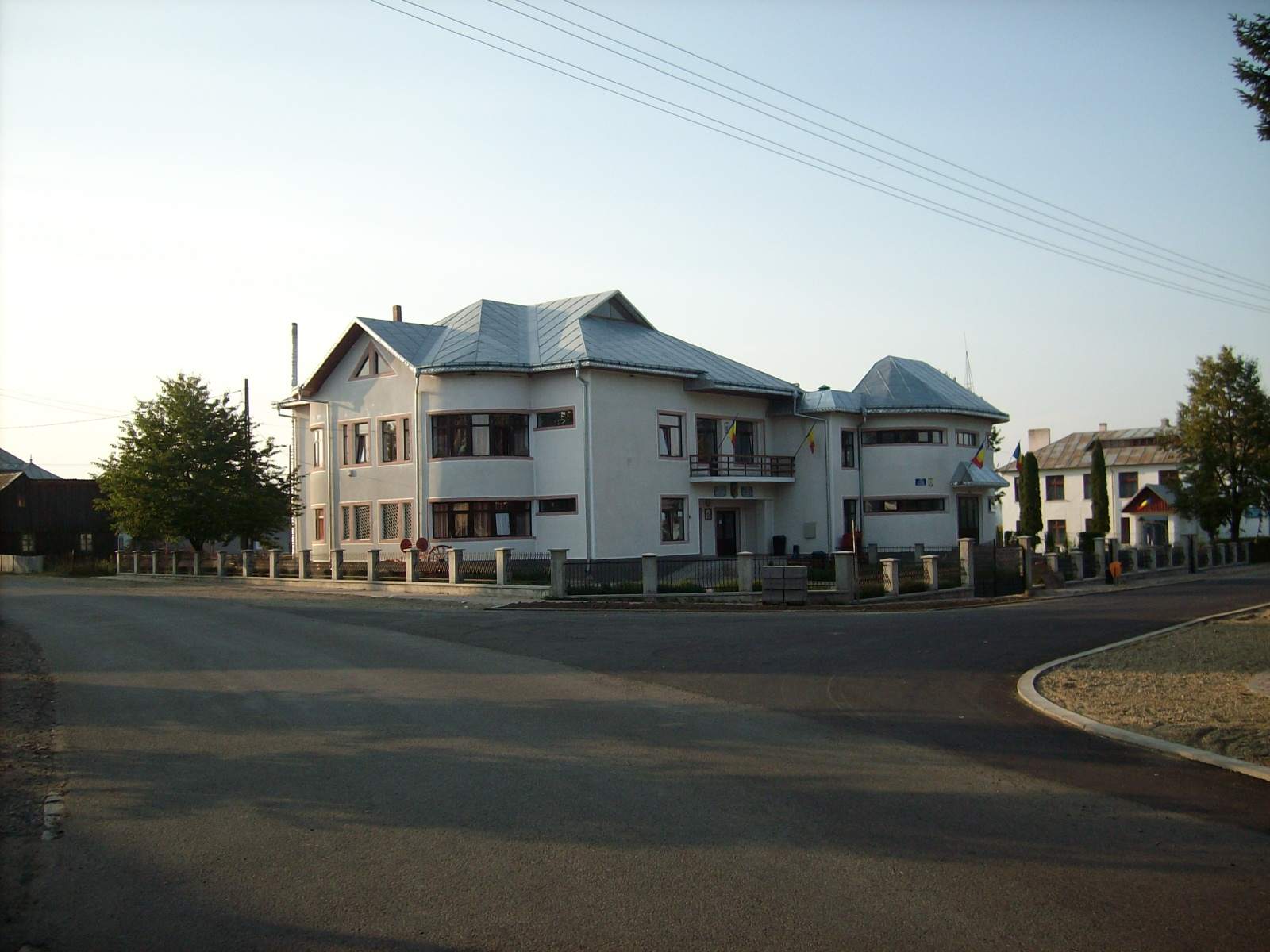
- The town hall and cultural home of Frătăuții Vechi

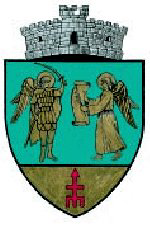
- Coat of arms

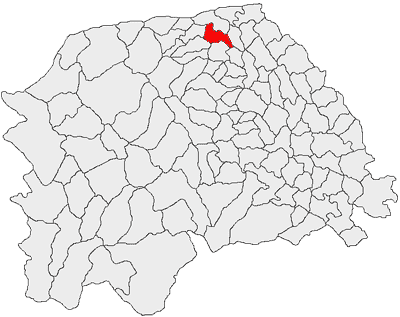
- Location in Suceava County

- Location in Romania
- Coordinates: 47°54′N 25°53′E
- Country: Romania
- County: Suceava
- Area: 35.89 km^{2} (13.86 sq mi)
- Elevation: 405 m (1,329 ft)
- Population (2021-12-01): 4,782
  - Density: 133.2/km^{2} (345.1/sq mi)
- Time zone: UTC+02:00 (EET)
  - Summer (DST): UTC+03:00 (EEST)
- Postal code: 727255
- Area code: (+40) 0230
- Vehicle reg.: SV
- Website: www.primariafratautiivechi.ro

Frătăuții Vechi (German: Alt Fratautz, Alt-Frautautz, Alt-Deutsch-Fratautz) is a commune located in Suceava County, Bukovina, northeastern Romania. It is composed of two villages: namely Frătăuții Vechi and Măneuți (Hungarian: Andrásfalva).

From 1786 to 1941, Măneuți village was inhabited by the Székelys of Bukovina. During the 1780s, 16 ethnic German families settled in Frătăuții Vechi in the course of the Josephine colonization (German: Josephinische Siedlung).

== History ==
Historical affiliations
- Moldavia (1388–1775)
- Habsburg Monarchy (1775–1804)
- Austrian Empire (1804–1867)
- Austria-Hungary, Cisleithania (1867–1918)
- Kingdom of Romania (1918–1947)
- Romanian People's Republic (1947–1965)
- Socialist Republic of Romania (1965–1989)
- Romania (1989–present)

As it is the case of other rural settlements from the countryside of Suceava County, Frătăuții Vechi (just like Frătăuții Noi for example) was previously inhabited by a sizeable German community, more specifically by Bukovina Germans (German: Bukowinadeutsche or Buchenlanddeutsche) during the modern period up until the mid 20th century, starting as early as the Habsburg period and, later on, the Austro-Hungarian period.

== Administration and local politics ==
=== Communal council ===
The commune's current local council has the following political composition, according to the results of the 2020 Romanian local elections:

Party	Seats	Current Council
National Liberal Party (PNL)	7	
Social Democratic Party (PSD)	3	
Social Liberal Humanist Party (PUSL)	2	
PRO Romania (PRO)	1	
People's Movement Party (PMP)	1	
Alliance for the Union of Romanians (AUR)	1	

== Natives ==
- Claudiu Isopescu (1894 – 1956), literary historian and translator
- Dimitrie Isopescu (1839 – 1901) teacher and politician
- Modest Isopescu (1895 – 1948), officer, administrator, and convicted war criminal
- Petru Luhan (born 1977), politician
- Mihai Tatulici (born 1948), journalist and writer

== Gallery ==
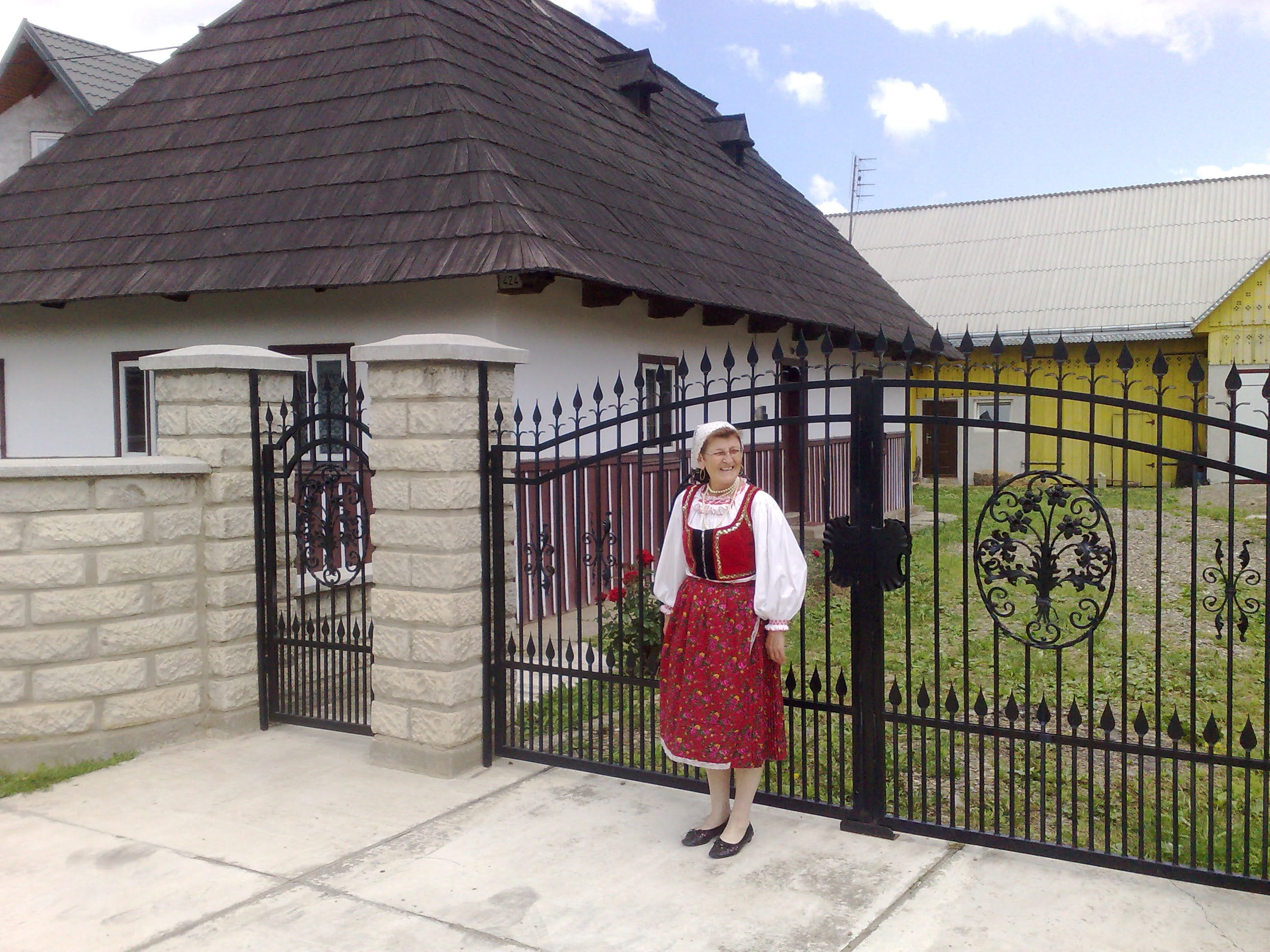
Măneuți, Hungarian/Székely village

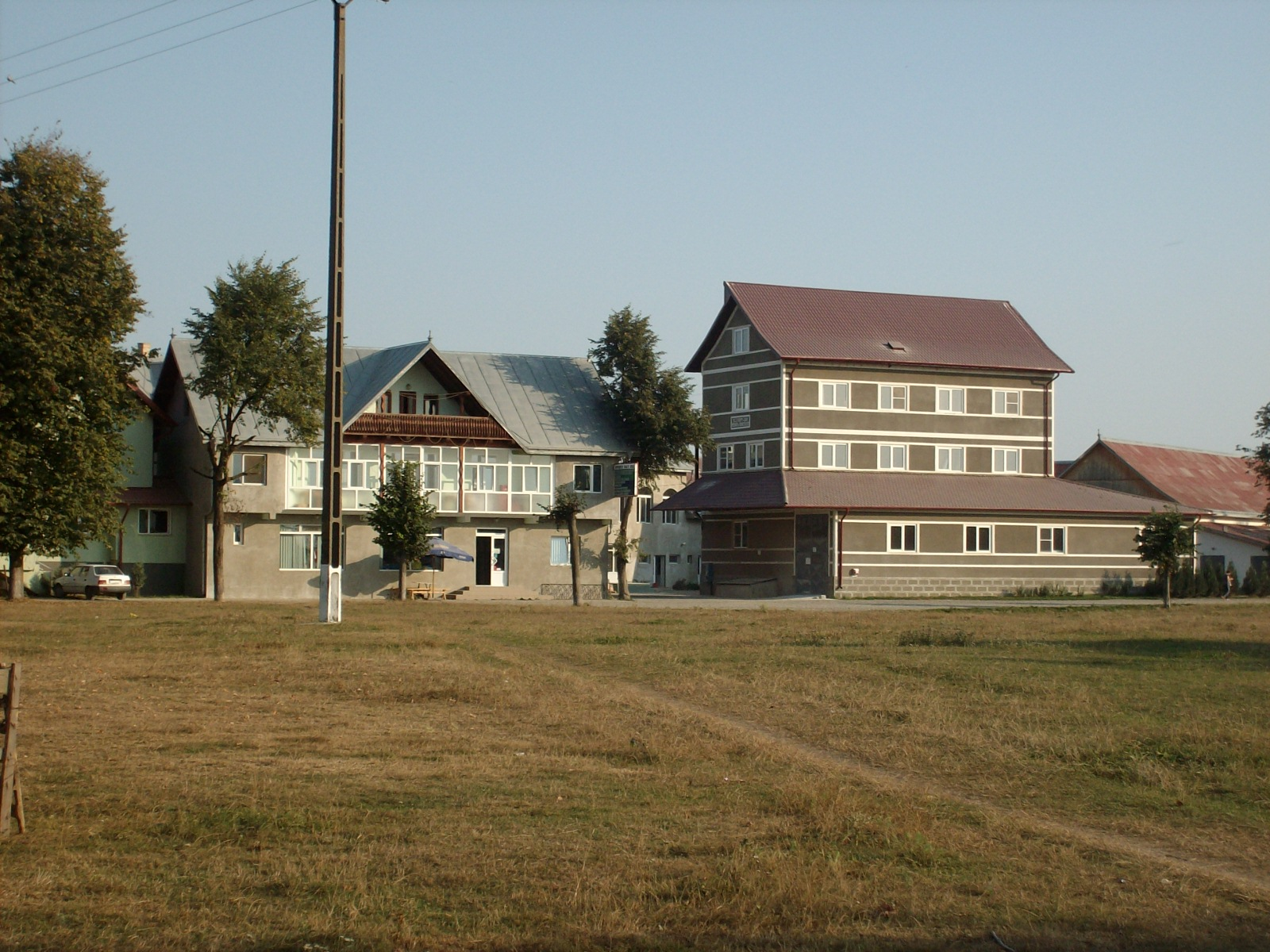
The local bakery and "Every Day" shop

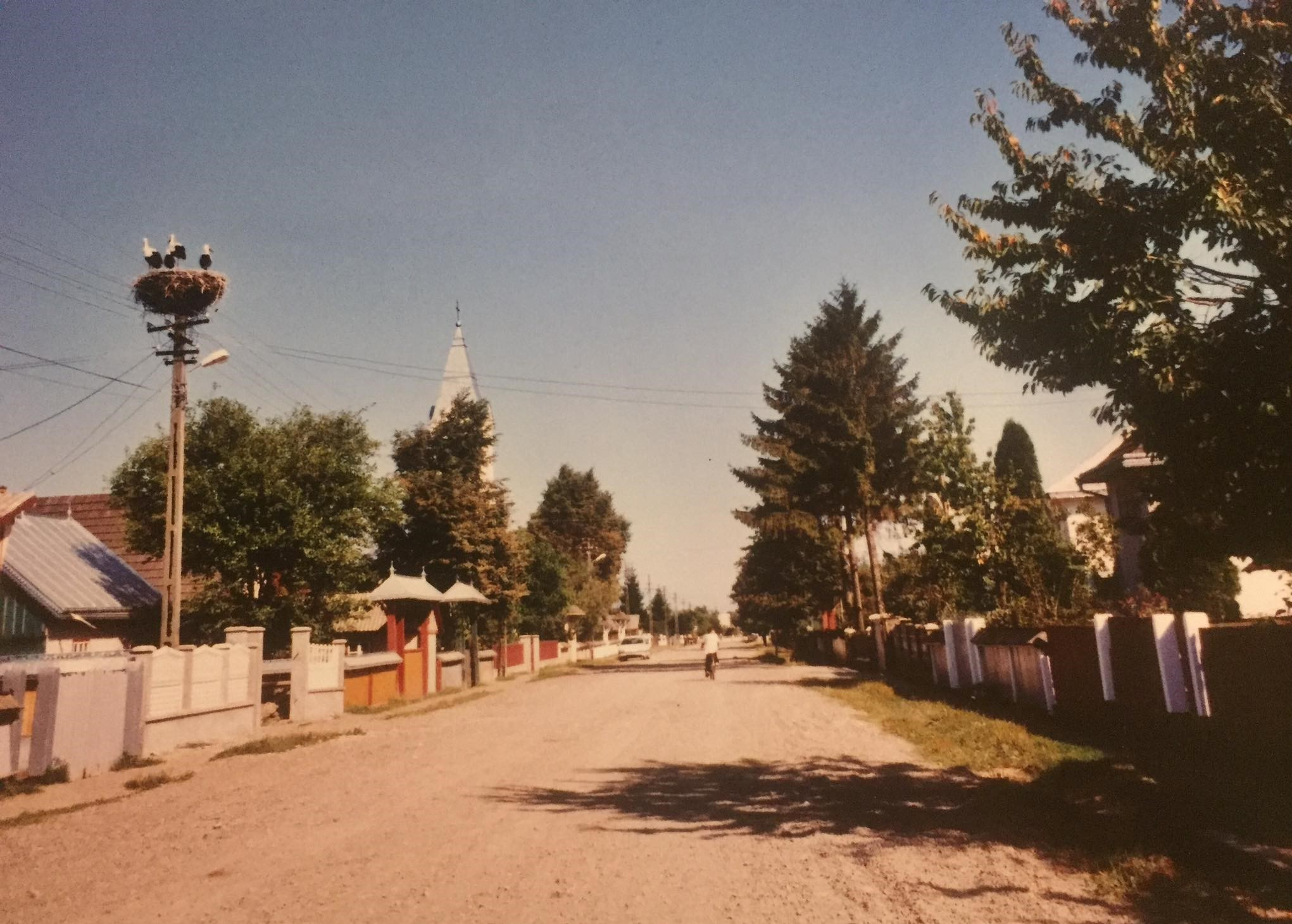
Măneuți in 2007

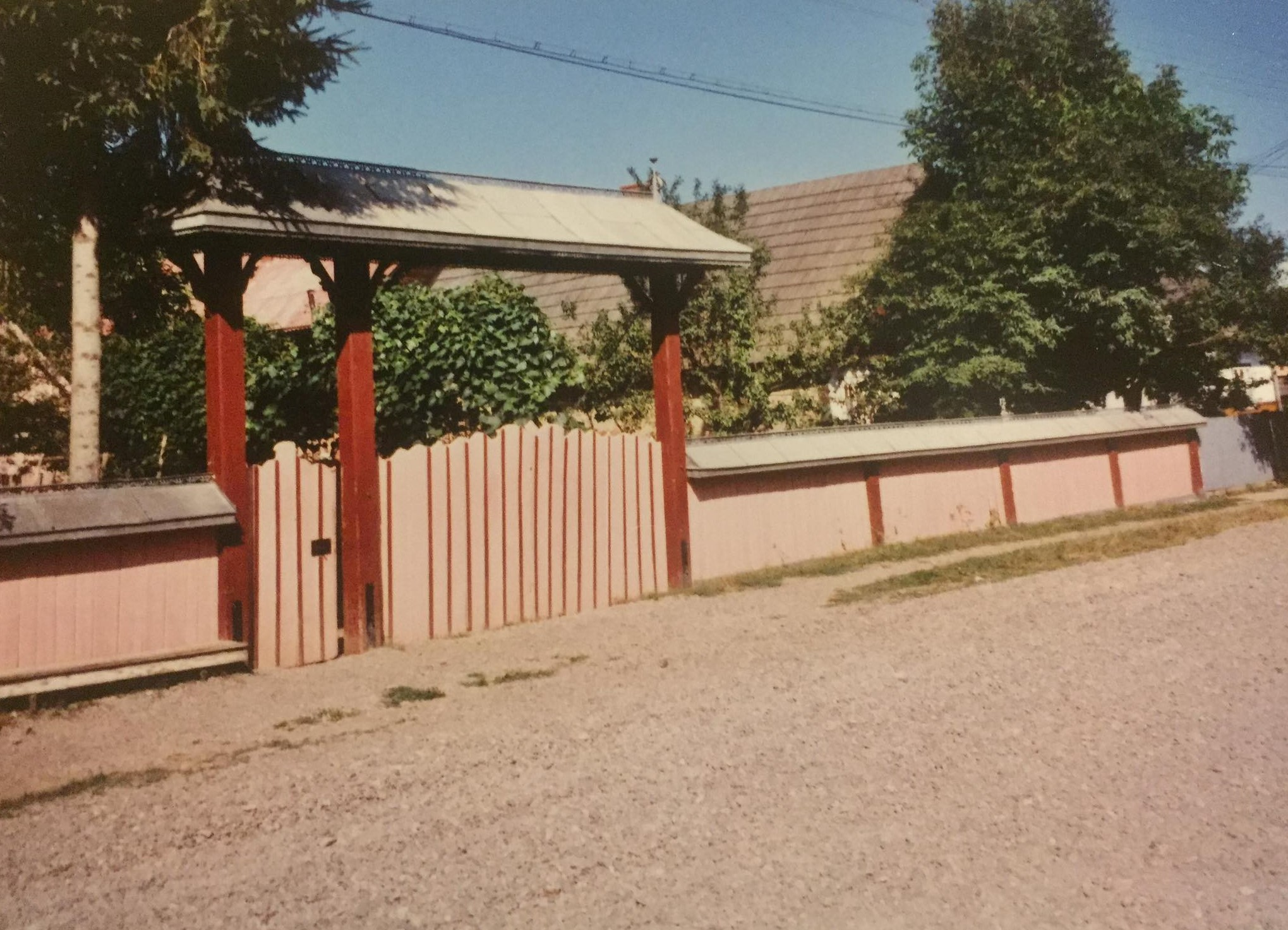
Székely gate in Măneuți

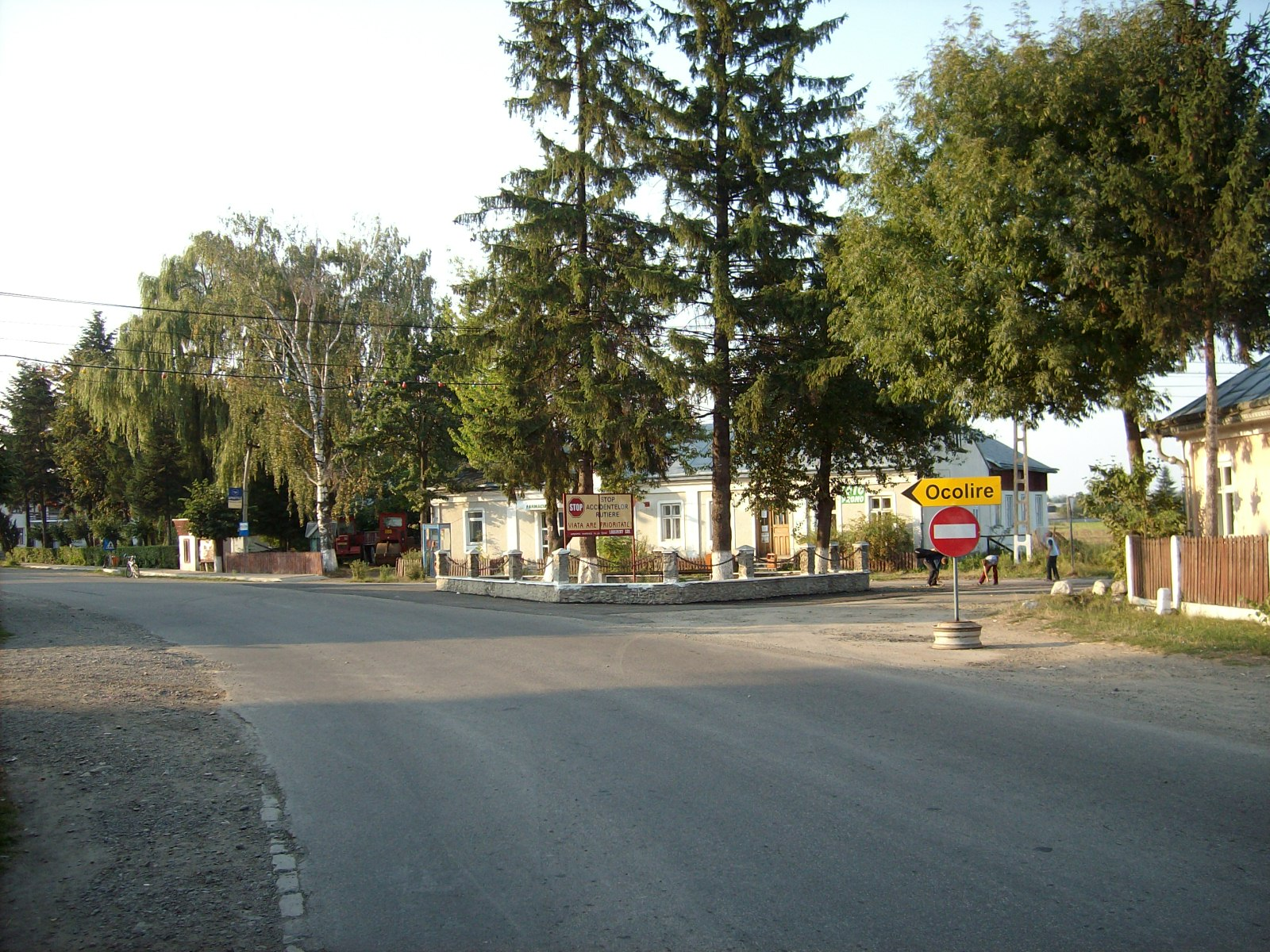
The center of Frătăuții Vechi

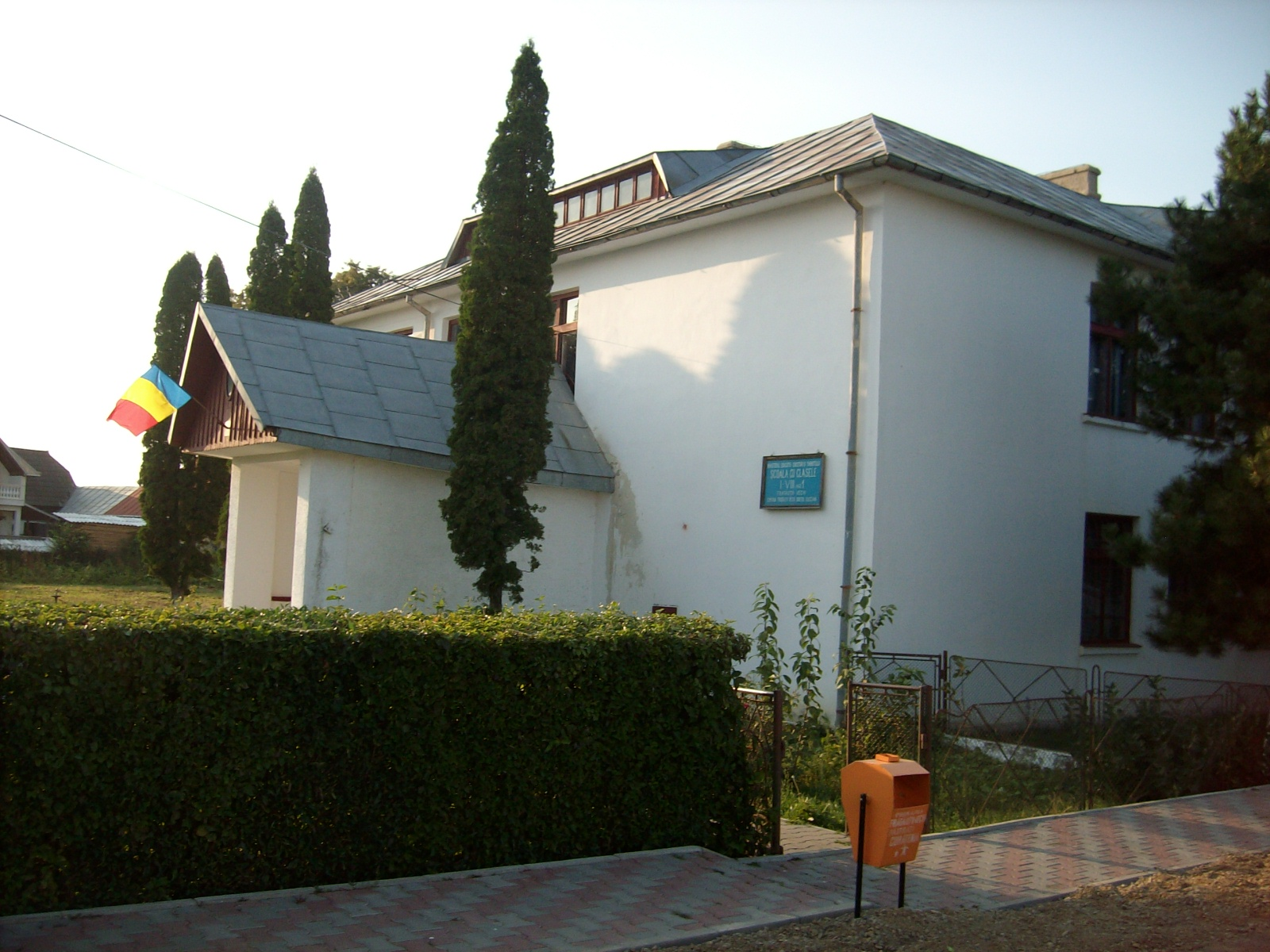
Local school in Frătăuții Vechi

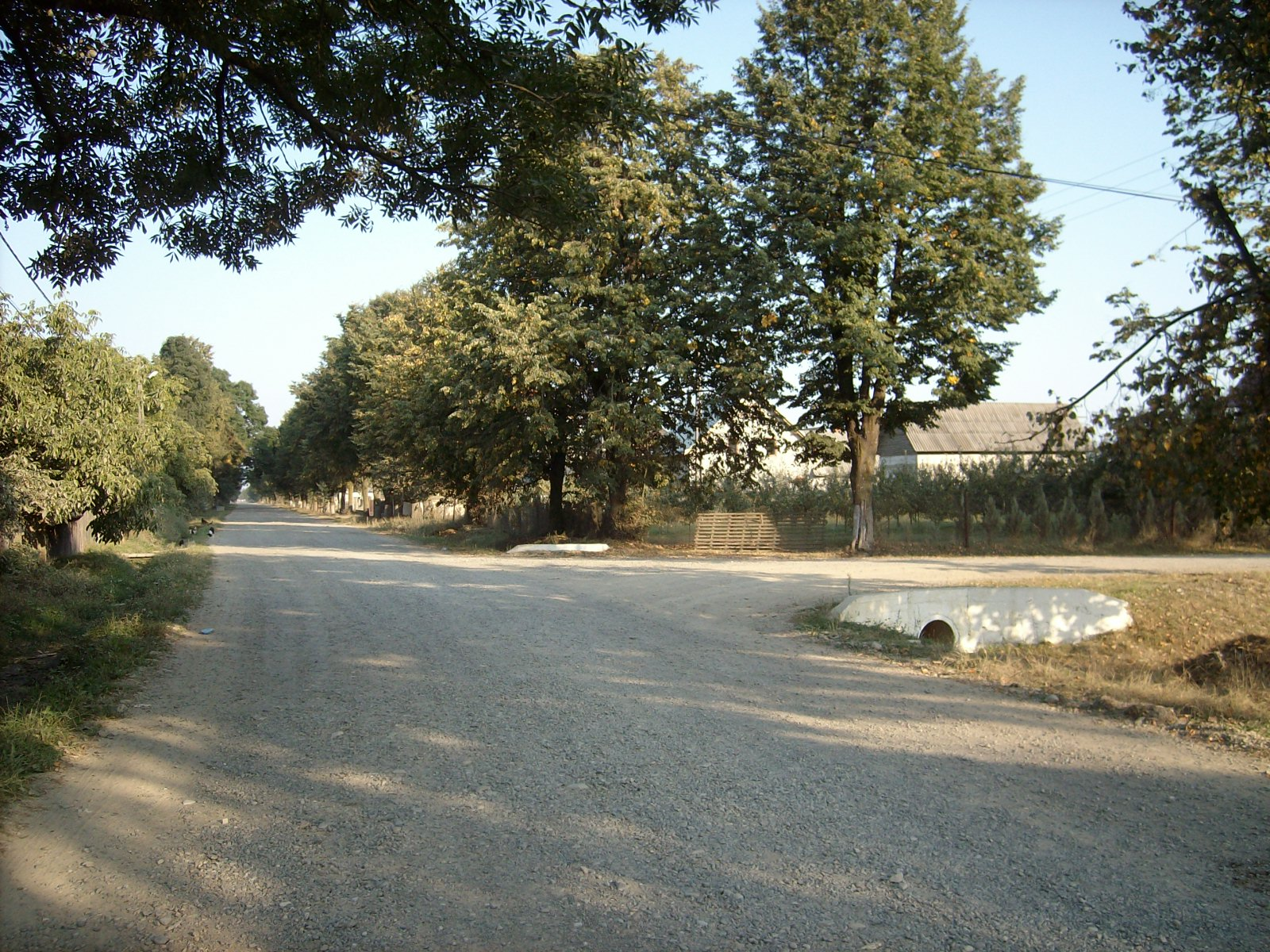
Frătăuții Vechi

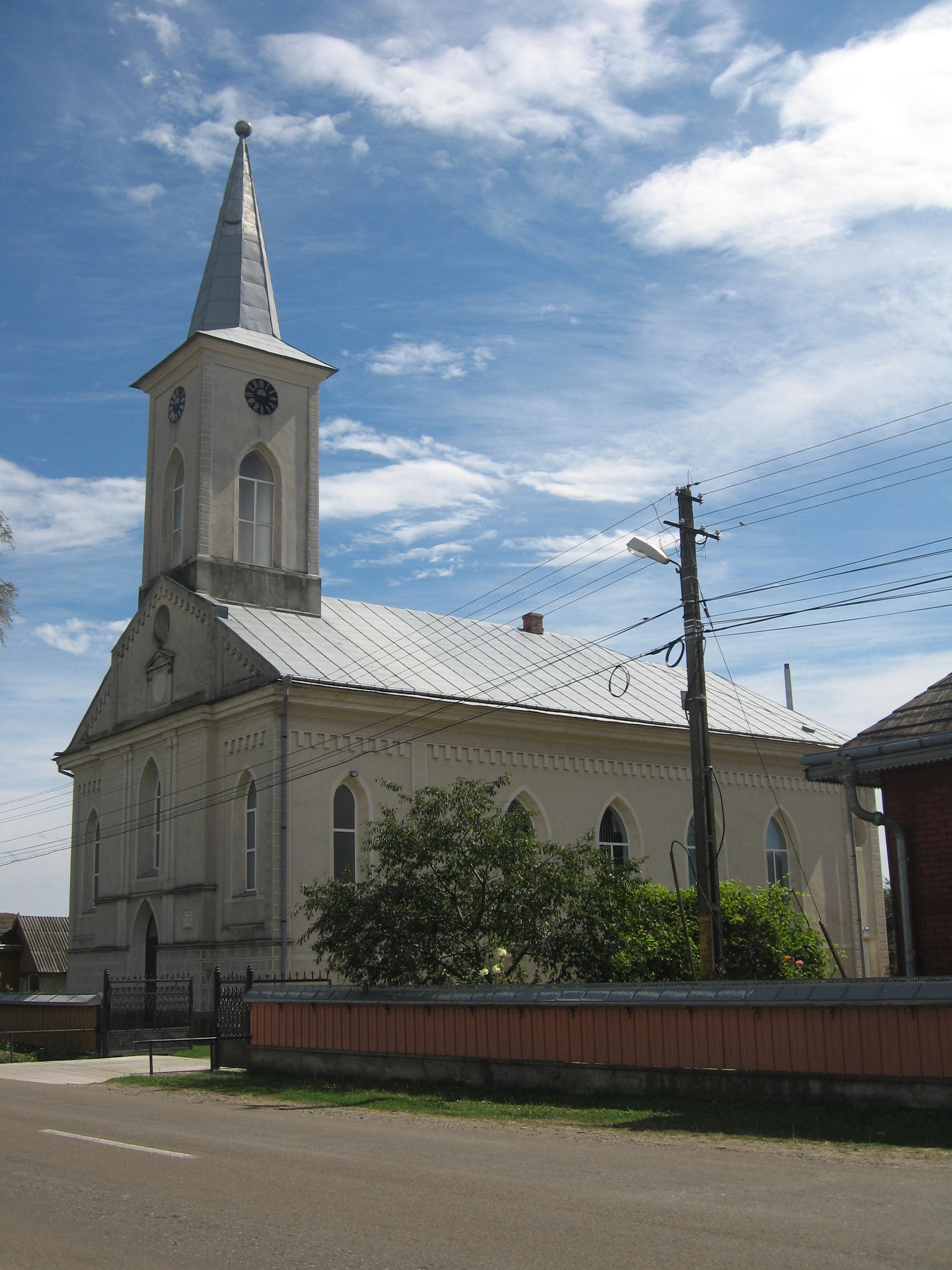
Lutheran church in Frătăuții Vechi

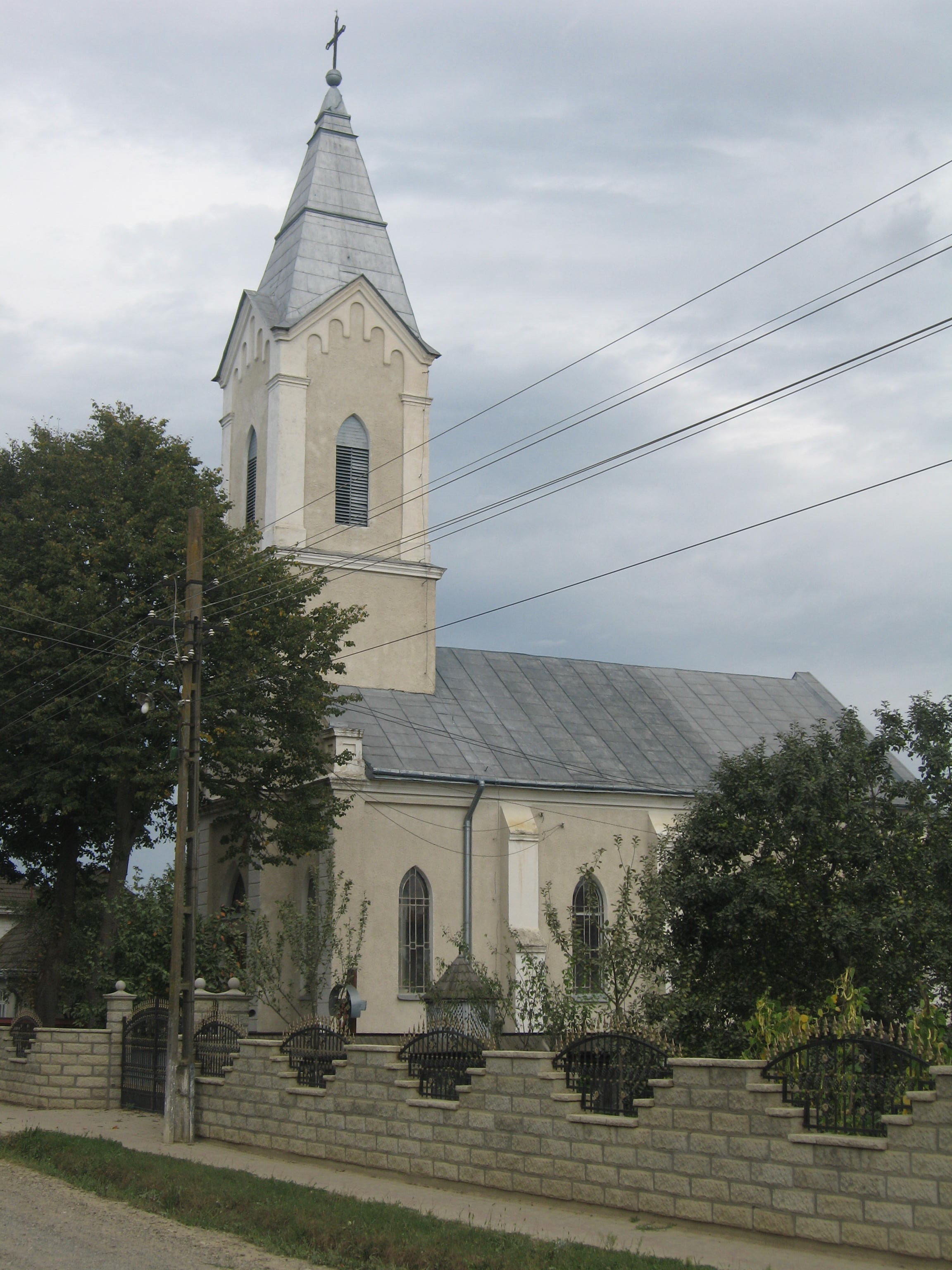
Orthodox church in Măneuți
