= Ciprian Porumbescu =

Romanian composer (1853–1883)

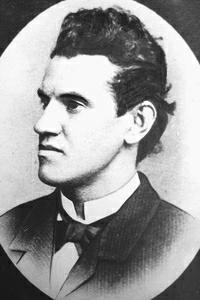
- Born: Ciprian Porumbescu; 14 October 1853; Șipotele Sucevei, Duchy of Bucovina (Austrian Empire)
- Died: 6 June 1883 (aged 29); Stupca, Kingdom of Romania (present-day Ciprian Porumbescu, Romania)
- Era: Romantic

Ciprian Porumbescu (Romanian: [tʃipriˈan porumˈbesku]; born Cyprian Gołęmbiowski; 14 October 1853 – 6 June 1883) was a Romanian composer born in Șipotele Sucevei in Bucovina. He was among the most celebrated Romanian composers of his time; his popular works include Crai nou, Song of the Tricolour, Song for Spring, Ballad for violin and piano, and Serenada. In addition, he composed the music for the Romanian patriotic "Song of Unity", also known as "Pe-al nostru steag e scris Unire" ("On our flag is written Unity"), which was Romania's anthem from 1975 to 1977 and is currently used for Albania's national anthem, "Himni i Flamurit". His work spreads over various forms and musical genres, but the majority of his work is choral and operetta.

== Life and career ==
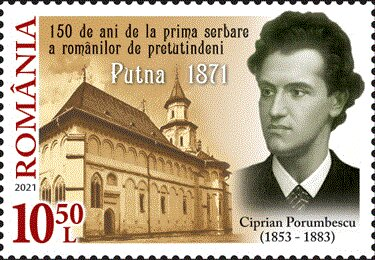
Ciprian Porumbescu on a 2021 stamp of Romania

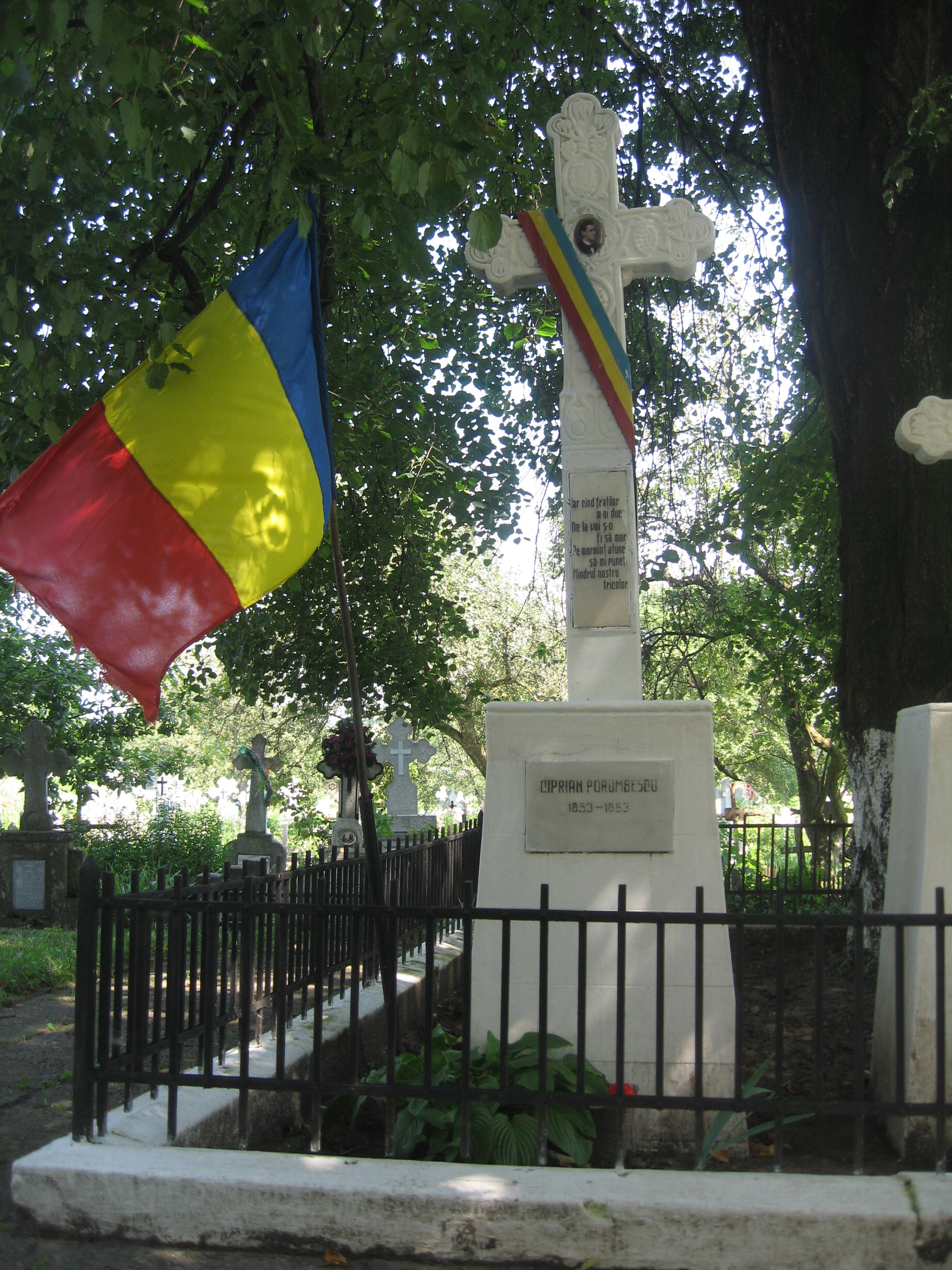
His tomb at San Demetrio church in Stupca

Ciprian Porumbescu was born into the family of Iraclie Gołęmbiowski a Romanian Orthodox priest and Emilia Clodnițchi, Polish, daughter of the forest brigadier from Voievodeasa. Iraclie Gołęmbiowski called himself Iraclie Porumbescu from his youth, but he did not officially change his name until 1881, when Ciprian was at school in Suceava. He was assigned as a priest to Șipotele Sucevei, a Hutsul village, as a punishment for repeatedly criticizing Bishop Eugene Hackmann's anti-Romanian attitude.

Ciprian studied music in Suceava and Cernăuți, then continued at the Konservatorium für Musik und darstellende Kunst in Vienna from 1879 to 1881 under Anton Bruckner and Franz Krenn. His artistic career as a composer, conductor, violinist, and pianist started in Cernăuți, and continued in Vienna, and later in Brașov where he taught vocal music at Romanian schools.

Ciprian Porumbescu wrote poetry, lyrics and press articles, and actively participated in public cultural life. He helped the rise of the Romanian music school during an age of enthusiasm generated by Romania's independence. Some of the most remarkable musical pages of the composer were inspired by national heroes and great army leaders, such as Stephen III of Moldavia and Dragoș Vodă. The appreciation of his music came from the melodic nature of his compositions and their folklore inspiration.

In 1877, Porumbescu was arrested by the Austrian authorities due to his political ideals of Bucovina independence manifested within the Arboroasa society; Arboroasa was a Romanian irredentist organisation in Cernowitz (Cernăuți). The arrest was carried out by investigating magistrate Benno Straucher, who will later become the leader of the Jewish community of Czernowitz. During detention, he contracted tuberculosis. He was released later after being found not guilty, going on to become a founding member of Societatea Academică Junimea (Junimea Academic Society). He died at the age of 29 in Stupca, which was renamed Ciprian Porumbescu in his honor.

Ciprian Porumbescu left a legacy of more than 250 works, bringing him fame and popularity through his short life. The composer saw his work Crai nou ("New Moon") performed in Brașov, while his vocal works Pe-al nostru steag ("On Our Flag"), Tricolorul ("The Tricolor", dedicated to Romania's national flag), Cântec de primăvară ("Spring Song"), Serenada, Cântecul gintei latine ("Latin Nation's Song"), La malurile Prutului ("On the Shores of the Prut River"), and Altarul mânăstirii Putna ("Putna Monastery's Altar") were already in the public conscience.

== Major works ==
=== Crai Nou ===
As a student at the Vienna Musical Conservatory, Porumbescu noted with great interest the success of operettas by Strauss, Suppé, Offenbach and others. His supreme goal was to replace the frivolity of subject-matter in the fashionable operettas with a plot that revived old Romanian traditions. Among them was Crai Nou (New Moon), in which the new-born moon will fulfill every lover's dreams of happiness (collected and published by Vasile Alecsandri), appeared the most appropriate for the dream-like environment of the local and earnest task he had in mind. The result was Romania's first operetta of the same name.

=== Ballad for Violin and Orchestra ===
Finished on 21 October 1880, the Ballad for Violin and Orchestra soon became the best known work by Ciprian Porumbescu, and a reference work in Romanian classical music of the 19th century. In seclusion at Stupca, the composer meditated, drafted and then finished the piece, full of poetry and bitter nostalgia, with light and shade, a mixture of "Doina", old dance and song, everything in the environment of serene melancholy.
