= Dimitrie Onciul =

Romanian historian

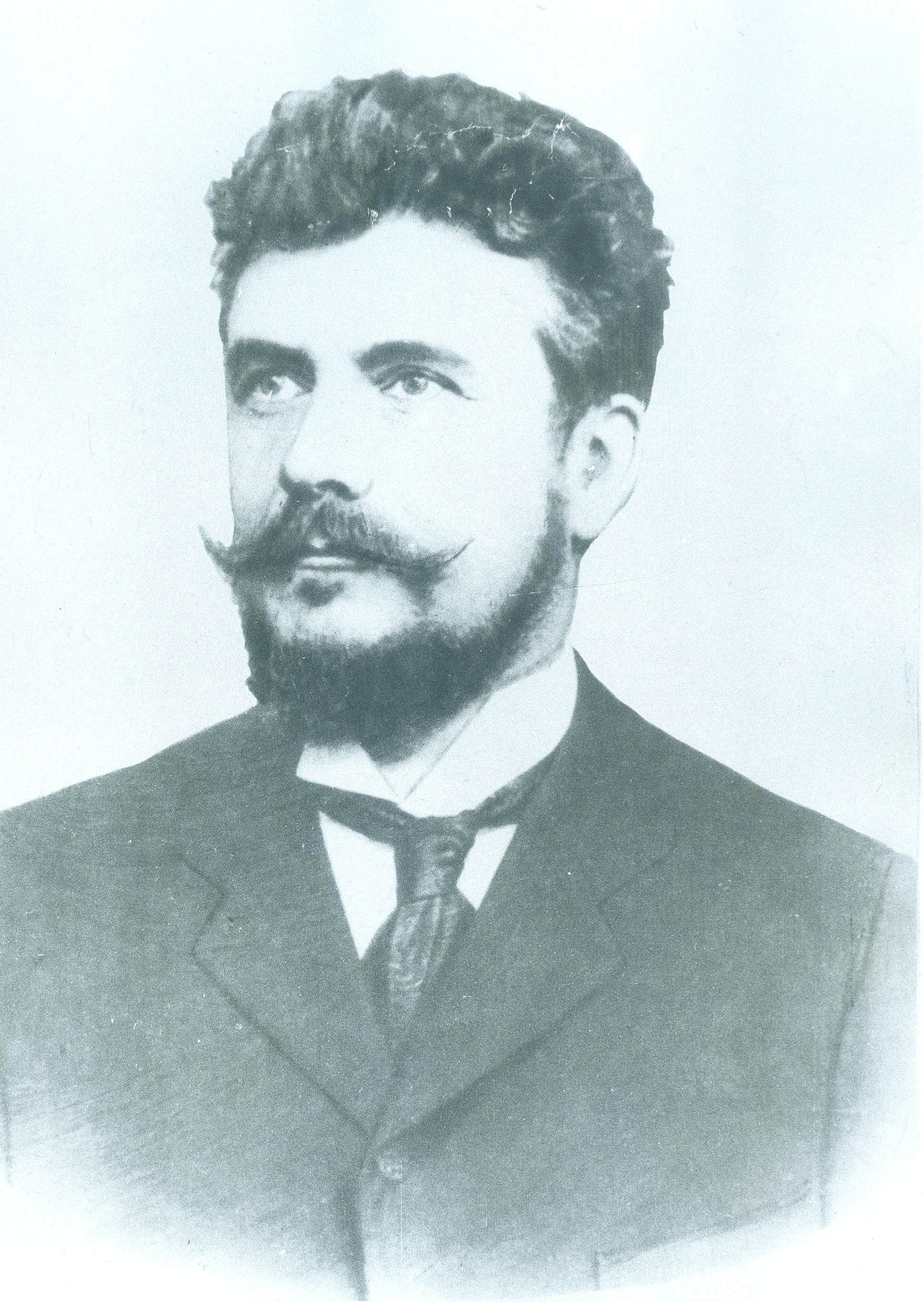
Dimitrie Onciul

Dimitrie Onciul (26 October / 7 November 1856 – 20 March 1923) was a Romanian historian. He was a member of the Romanian Academy and its president from 1920 until his death in 1923.

== Biography ==
Onciul was born in Straja, at the time in the Duchy of Bukovina, Austrian Empire, now in Suceava County, Romania. He studied at the University of Czernowitz, where he was active in Arboroasa and then in Societatea Academică Junimea, and at the University of Vienna. In 1884, he received his doctorate in philosophy from the University of Czernowitz.

He became a professor at the University of Bucharest and director of the National Archives of Romania. He was the first chairman of the Advisory Heraldic Commission. Together with Ioan Bogdan, Onciul founded a school-of-thought in Romanian historiography that approached history critically. He dealt with the issue of Romanian origin, demonstrating the formation of the Romanian people over a wide area on both sides of the Danube and rejected the theory of medieval migration of Romanians from the Balkan Peninsula. Much of his work dealt with and documented the formation of the early Romanian feudal states. He sought to separate Medieval realities from 20th century politics.

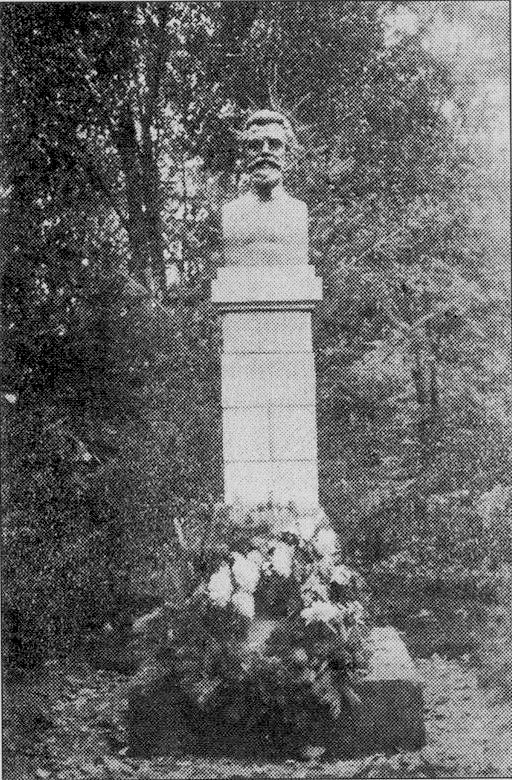
Monument of Dimitrie Onciul in Cernăuți (Chernivtsi), installed by the Romanian authorities in 1928, demolished by the Soviet authorities after the occupation of the city

== Selected works ==
- Teoria lui Roesler. Studii asupra stăruinții românilor în Dacia Traiană (Roesler's theory: Studies on the Persistence of Romanians in Dacia Felix) (1885)
- Radu Negru și originile Principatului Țării Românești (Radu Negru and Origins of the Principality of Wallachia) (1890-1892)
- Originile Principatelor Române (The Origins of the Romanian Principalities) (1899)
- Ideea latinității și a unității naționale (The Concept of Rome and National Unity) (1919)
- Tradiția istorică în chestiunea originilor române (Historical Tradition in the Issue of Romanian Origin) (1906-1907)

== Legacy ==
The Romanian Academy established an historiography prize in his name, known as the "Dimitrie Onciul Award".

There are streets named after him in Sector 2 of Bucharest, and in the cities of Cluj-Napoca, Pitești, and Suceava.

== Notes ==
Preceded by Petru Poni	President of the Romanian Academy; 1920–1923	Succeeded by Iacob C. Negruzzi
