= Petru Luhan =

Romanian politician

Petru Luhan MEP
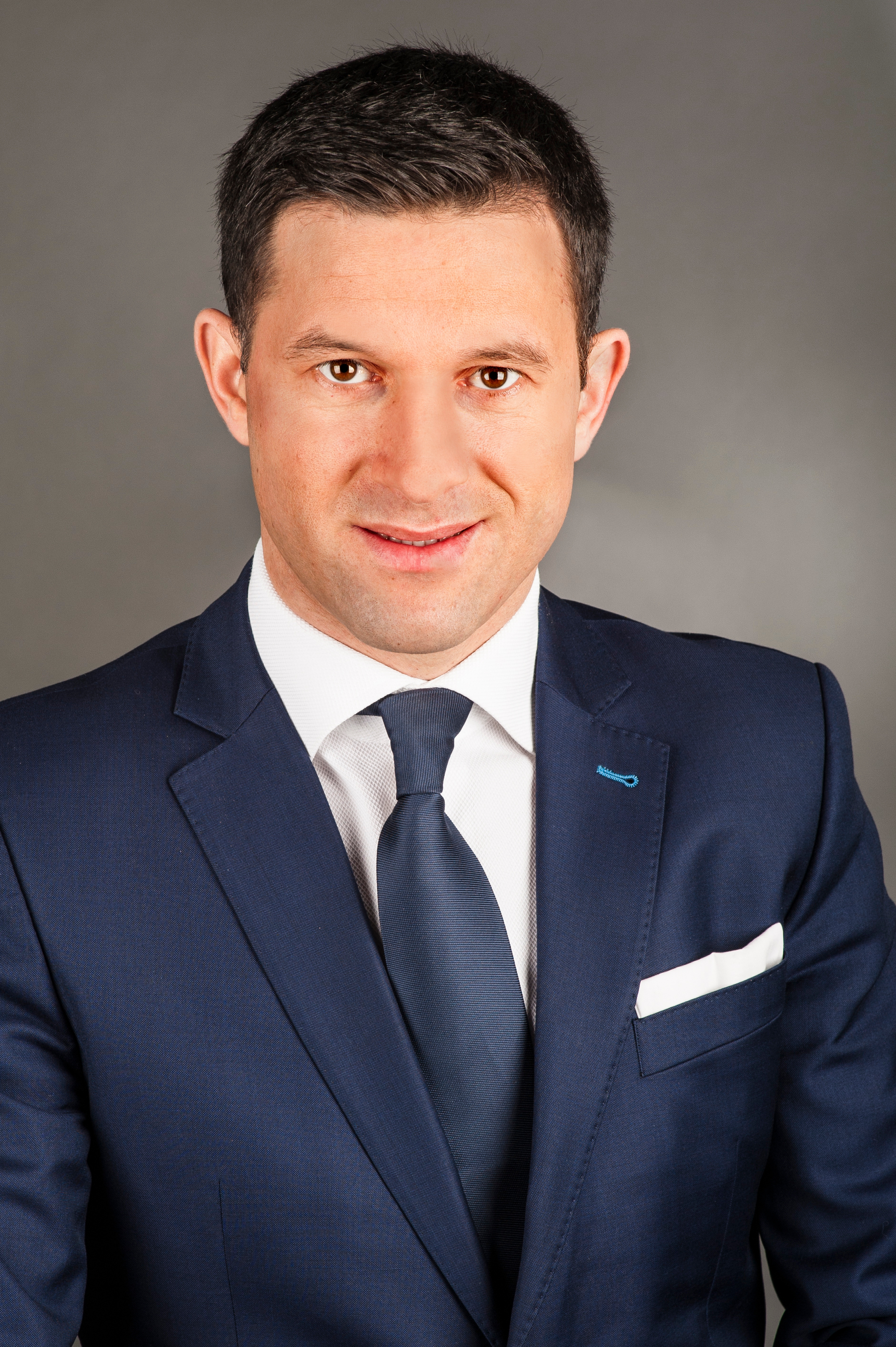

Member of the European Parliament for Romania
- Incumbent
- Assumed office 8 June 2009 Serving with 32 others

Personal details
- Born: 19 March 1977 (age 49) Frătăuții Vechi, Suceava County, Romania
- Party: Democratic Liberal Party

Petru Constantin Luhan (born 19 March 1977) is a Romanian politician, who since the 2009 election has been a Member of the European Parliament for Romania, representing the Democratic Liberal Party (PDL). He is a member of the Regional Development Committee and vice-president of EPP Young Members in the European Parliament.

== Education ==
Luhan studied economics at Osnabrück University in Germany and also had study exchanges in the United States and Australia.

== Parliamentary Activities ==
- Regional Development Committee
- Awarded MEP of the Year in 2013 in the Health Category
