= Ilișești =

- Commune
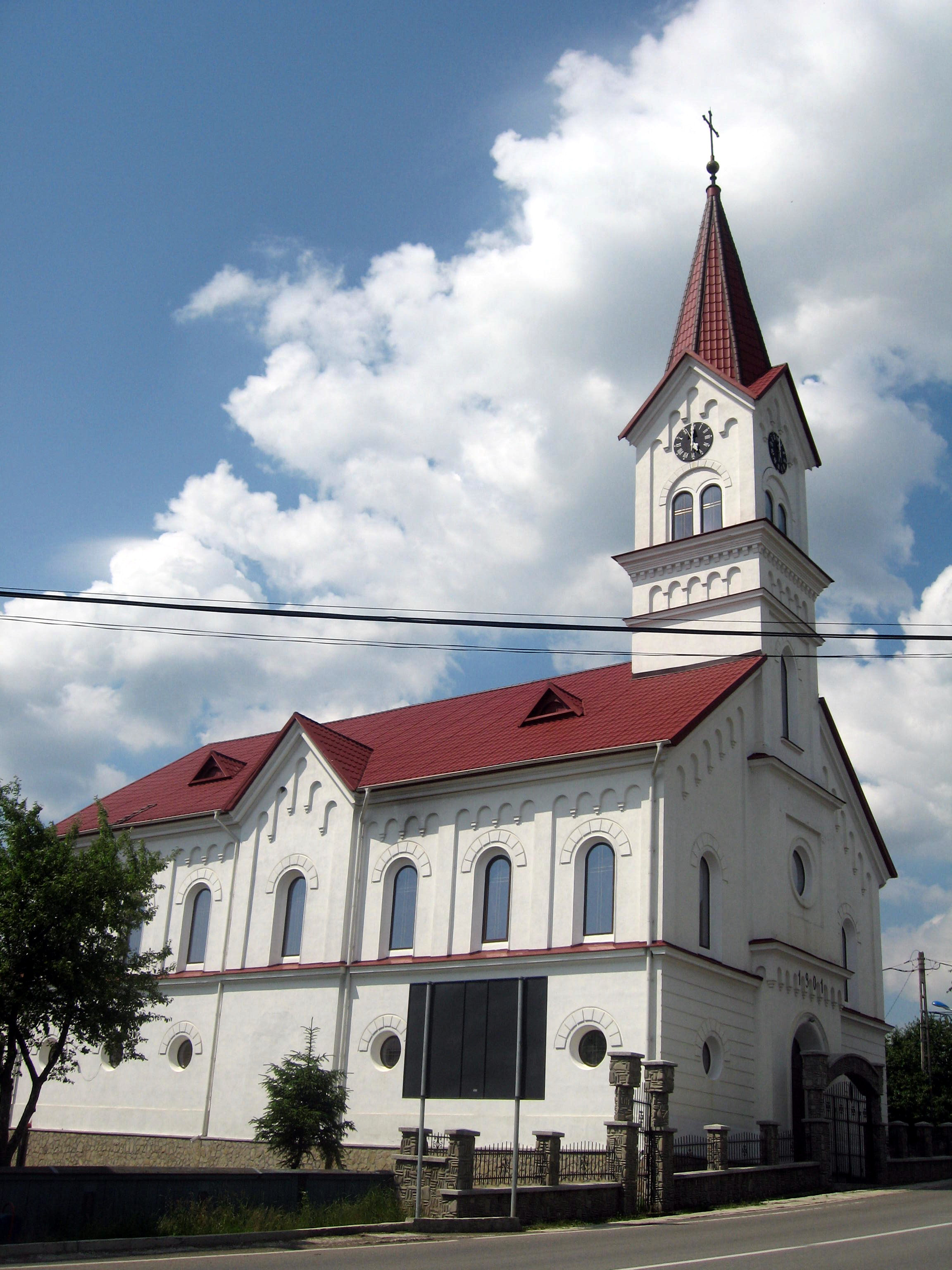
- Former Evangelical Lutheran church, previously belonging to the Bukovina German community, now a Romanian Orthodox church

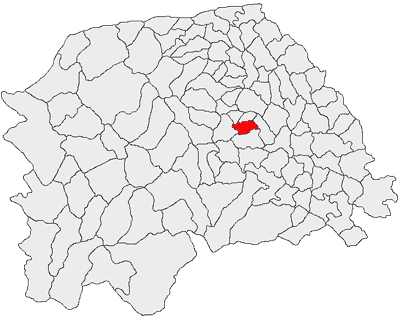
- Location in Suceava County

- Location in Romania
- Coordinates: 47°36′N 26°3′E
- Country: Romania
- County: Suceava

Government
  - Mayor (2020–2024): Florinel-Răduțu Avasiloaie (PNL)
- Area: 33.2 km^{2} (12.8 sq mi)
- Elevation: 398 m (1,306 ft)
- Population (2021-12-01): 2,839
  - Density: 85.5/km^{2} (221/sq mi)
- Time zone: UTC+02:00 (EET)
  - Summer (DST): UTC+03:00 (EEST)
- Postal code: 727130
- Area code: (+40) 02 30
- Vehicle reg.: SV
- Website: www.comunailisesti.ro

Ilișești (German: Illischestie or Deutsch-Illischescht) is a commune located in Suceava County, Bukovina, northeastern Romania. It is composed of two villages, Brașca (German: Braschka) and Ilișești. The commune was called Ciprian Porumbescu (with Ilișești as its center) and included the villages of Bălăceana and Ciprian Porumbescu until 2004, when these were split off to form separate communes.

== History ==
During the 1780s, 12 ethnic-German families settled in Ilișești in the course of the Josephine colonization. These ethnic Germans were part of the then-emerging Bukovina German community which formed in the historical region of Bukovina during the Habsburg period under Austria-Hungary.

== Administration and local politics ==
=== Commune council ===
The commune's current local council has the following political composition, according to the results of the 2020 Romanian local elections:

Party	Seats	Current Council
National Liberal Party (PNL)	4	
Social Democratic Party (PSD)	3	
Save Romania Union (USR)	2	
PRO Romania (PRO)	1	
Romanian Ecologist Party (PER)	1	

== Natives ==
- Leontin Grozavu (born 1967), football player and manager
- Simion Florea Marian (1847–1907), folklorist, ethnographer, Orthodox priest, and teacher
