= Dimitrie Isopescu =

Australian Teacher and Politician

Dimitrie C. Isopescu (October 3, 1839 – May 1, 1901) was an Austro-Hungarian teacher and politician.

== Biography ==
Born into an ethnic Romanian family in Frătăuții Vechi, in the Bukovina region of the Austrian Empire, his parents were the Romanian Orthodox priest Constantin and his wife Ana (née Brăilean), a native of nearby Bilca. He had two brothers, Gheorghe and Nicolae. After attending primary school in Rădăuți, he enrolled in the high school at Czernowitz (Cernăuți); one of his teachers there was Aron Pumnul. Initially studying theology according to the family tradition, he abandoned this discipline after a year, due to a lack of vocation. In 1860, he entered the University of Vienna with a wish to pursue a career as a teacher. He graduated from the history and geography faculty in 1864. The same year, he was hired as a teacher in those subjects at the Greek Orthodox Gymnasium in Suceava, remaining there for five years. In 1869, he transferred to the Czernowitz Gymnasium, and was elected a member of the provincial school council. A year later, thanks to his managerial talent, he was named director of a newly established state normal school. The school was initially for boys, but Isopescu opened a section for girls in 1872. He was the first teacher in the area to offer classes on pedagogy in Romanian.

In 1875, Isopescu joined a Vienna-based committee for the preservation of historical and artistic monuments in Bukovina. In 1877, he became inspector for the province's Romanian-language primary schools. In 1880, he was elected a member of the city council, and from 1890 headed the local museum. He was involved in promoting the establishment of Romanian schools in the villages, including the province's first kindergartens, and the drafting of textbooks. From 1873, he edited Bukowinaer Pädagogische Blätter, the province's first pedagogical magazine, which advocated on behalf of Romanian schools and teachers. In addition to textbooks, his writings include pedagogical and historical works; some were published, while others remain in manuscript.

In the summer of 1900, some months before the Austrian election of 1900-1901, there was a split among the Romanian politicians of Bukovina. One faction, led by the youthful firebrands Iancu Flondor and George Popovici, favored confrontation with the authorities; another, headed by Ioan von Volcinschi, was made up of older men who preferred accommodation. The latter group ran Isopescu as its candidate against Popovici, and he won the contest for a seat in the Austrian House of Deputies. He died of heart disease in Vienna shortly thereafter.

He was married to Aglaia Constantinovici-Grecu. The couple had a daughter and four sons, including Constantin Isopescu-Grecul.

== Publications ==
- Beziehungen Karls des Großen zu den Saracenen in Spanien und zu den abbasidischen Chalifen von Bagdad. Czernowitz, 1869.
- Das Theorem der Fourier'schen Reihen. Czernowitz, 1873.
- Schematismus der Bukowiner Volksschulen und Lehrer, zusammengestellt auf Grundlage amtlicher Daten. Bukowiner Landeslehrerverein, Czernowitz, 1894.
