= Arboroasa =

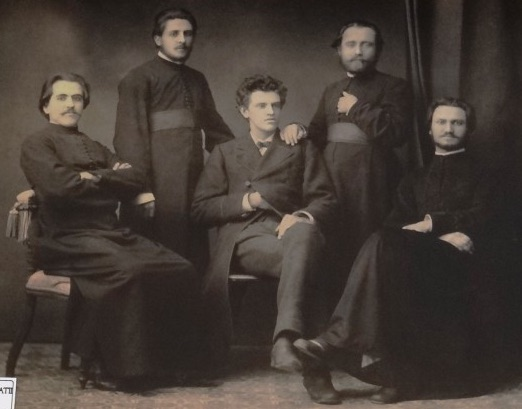
The leadership of Arboroasa; Porumbescu is in the center.

Arboroasa (roughly, "the woodland") was a society (Studentenverbindung) for Romanian students in the Austro-Hungarian city of Czernowitz (Cernăuți; now Chernivtsi, Ukraine), located in the Bukovina region of Cisleithania. Operating between 1875 and 1877 and attracting several dozen participants, its activities were both cultural and patriotic in nature; a central figure within the group was composer Ciprian Porumbescu. Arboroasa was shut down by the authorities and the leadership arrested after members sent two politically sensitive telegrams to the Romanian Old Kingdom. However, a year later, the organization was largely reconstituted as Societatea Academică Junimea.

== Founding and activity ==
The society, which was given an old name for Bukovina, was founded on December 22, 1875, at the newly established Czernowitz University. Meanwhile, similar organizations were set up for German, Polish and Ruthenian students, as well as a pan-national group. Arboroasa's initiator, Teodor V. Ștefanelli, had been a member of the Romania Jună Society, and used the latter group's statute as a model for the new organization. Its stated purpose was to perfect members' patriotic, literary and cultural consciousness, to develop a social spirit and to assist poorer members, including free medical care in case of illness.

Among its leaders were students Ciprian Porumbescu, Gherasim Buliga, Ion Topală, Zaharia Voronca, Gheorghe Popescu and Dimitrie Onciul. They aimed to strengthen the identity and raise the prestige of Romanians in Bukovina. To this end, they organized conferences related to national literature and history, as well as Romanian-themed musical and literary evenings; set up a library and reading rooms; and maintained ties with other student societies in the Romanian Old Kingdom and in Transylvania. Buliga was the first president, followed by Porumbescu. The motto was by Vasile Alecsandri (Uniți să fim în cugete, uniți în Dumnezeu — "Let us be united in our thoughts, united under God"), members wore a ribbon with the blue-yellow-red of the Romanian tricolor, and the official song was written by Ștefanelli, with music by Porumbescu.

Initially, of 53 Romanian students at Czernowitz, 44 joined Arboroasa as ordinary members. It was financed through fees levied on these as well as through donations from supporters; other membership categories included founder, supporter, honorary and extraordinary. In 1877, learning through press reports that the Romanian government had set aside 1000 lei for cultural organizations located outside the country's borders, the leadership asked for part of this money, and received 250 lei. The same summer, as the Romanian Army was winning victories in the War of Independence, members of Arboroasa were gleeful, toasting the successes of their "brothers fighting beyond". Meanwhile, the Bukovina authorities received instructions from Vienna to collect funds for wounded troops from the opposing Ottoman side.

== Suppression and legacy ==
On October 1, 1877, members of the society sent a condolence telegram to the city hall of Iași in Romania, in order to mark the centenary of the beheading of Grigore III Ghica, who had refused to cede Bukovina to Austria. A second, celebratory, telegram was sent to the Romanian capital Bucharest in order to mark the Fall of Plevna during the war. The imperial Austrian authorities, also taking into account the subsidies received from Romania, considered these as acts of treason, and disbanded the society on November 11. This act prompted a fierce reaction in the Romanian-language press, both in Hungarian-ruled Oradea, and in Iași and Bucharest. In particular, an article by C. A. Rosetti published repeatedly in Românul created a stir within Bucharest's diplomatic circles, and also drew notice from Vienna. A search at Arboroasa headquarters revealed compromising documents from societies in the Transylvanian cities of Blaj and Gherla, as well as in Vienna.

The leadership committee, consisting of Porumbescu, Voronca, Constantin Morariu, Orest Popescu and Eugen Sireteanu, was arrested. After a trial held in Czernowitz in early February 1878, the accused were acquitted by unanimous jury verdict and released after being kept in prison for eleven weeks. It was during this prison stay that Porumbescu contracted the tuberculosis that would lead to his death. The trial drew notice from Mihai Eminescu, who wrote about what he considered the mistaken policies adopted by the imperial court at Vienna toward Bukovina's Romanians. Despite the acquittal, the ringleaders were placed under surveillance and expected to limit themselves to cultural manifestations. Nevertheless, after a few months, the local Romanian students again increased their organizational activity. In December 1878, a new group, Societatea Academică Junimea, was established; it continued the objectives set forth by Arboroasa, and largely consisted of the same members.
