= Ciprian Porumbescu, Suceava =

Ciprian Porumbescu
- Commune
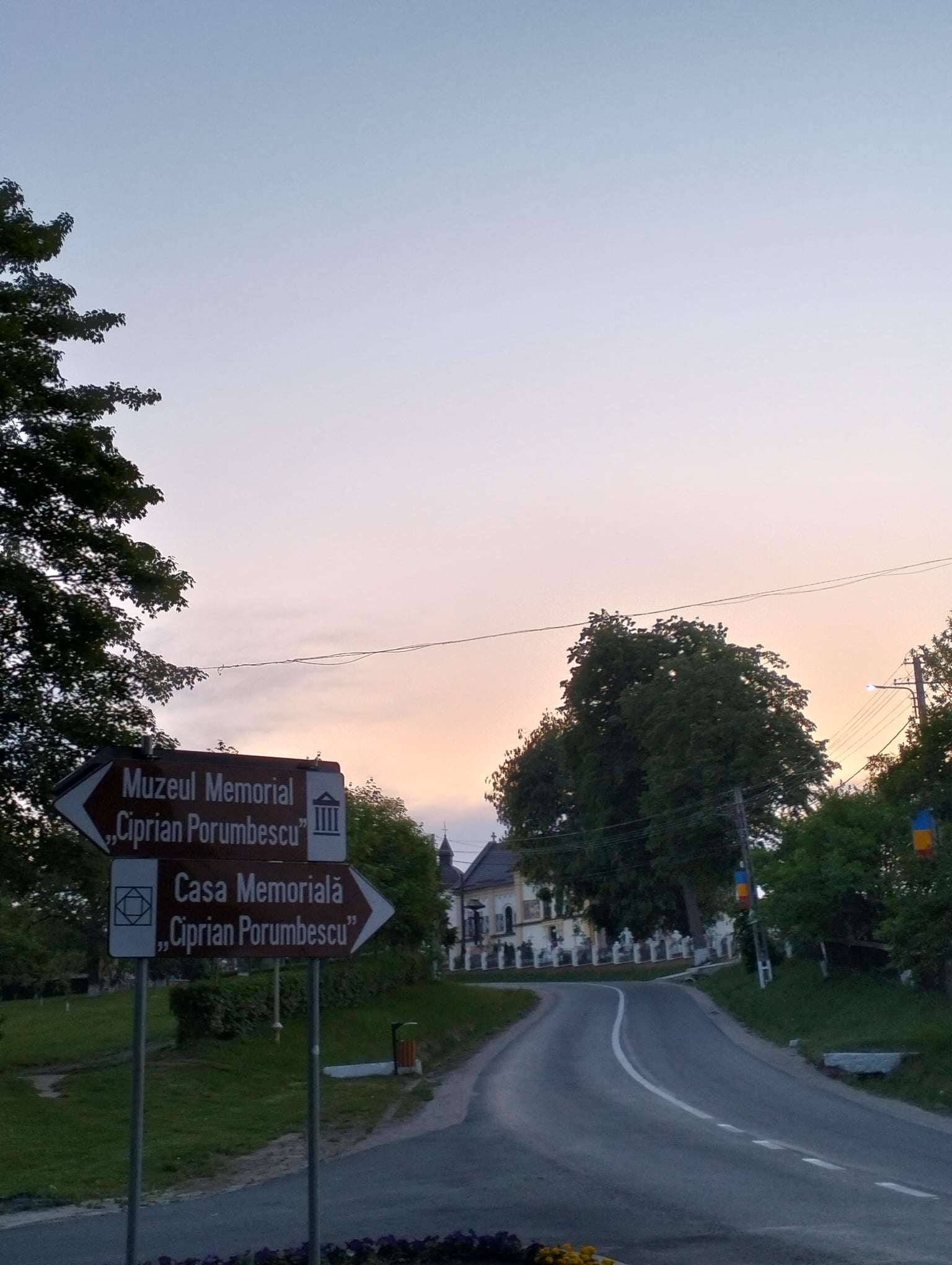
- Centre of the village

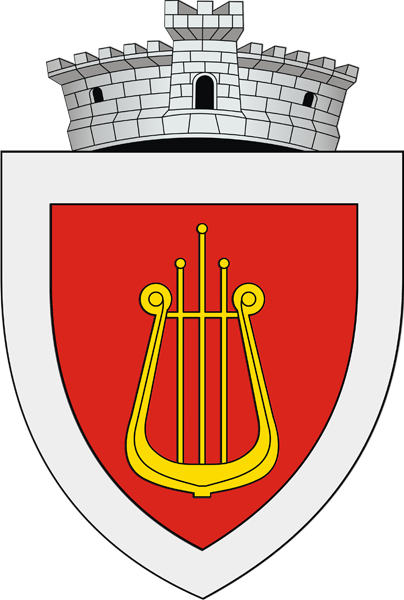
- Coat of arms

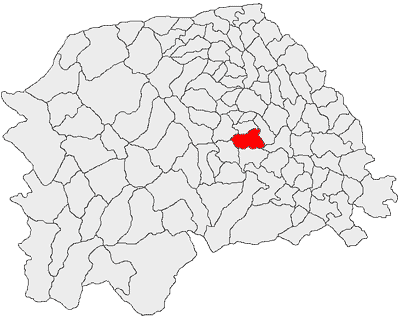
- Location in Suceava County

- Location in Romania
- Coordinates: 47°34′N 26°4′E
- Country: Romania
- County: Suceava

Government
  - Mayor (2024–2028): Dumitru Nimițean (PSD)
- Area: 30.56 km^{2} (11.80 sq mi)
- Elevation: 396 m (1,299 ft)
- Population (2021-12-01): 2,090
  - Density: 68.4/km^{2} (177/sq mi)
- Time zone: UTC+02:00 (EET)
  - Summer (DST): UTC+03:00 (EEST)
- Postal code: 727125
- Area code: (+40) 02 30
- Vehicle reg.: SV
- Website: ciprian-porumbescu.ro

Ciprian Porumbescu (German: Stupka) is a commune located in Suceava County, Bukovina, northeastern Romania. It is composed of a single village, namely Ciprian Porumbescu. The village was part of Ilișești (German: Illischestie) commune, theretofore called Ciprian Porumbescu, until 2004, when it was split off to form a separate commune. The commune was named in honor of Romanian composer Ciprian Porumbescu, who died there in 1883. Until 1953, it was called Stupca.
