= Claudiu Isopescu =

Romanian philologist and educationist

Claudiu Isopescu (April 18 [O.S. April 5] 1894 – April 1, 1956) was an Austro-Hungarian-born Romanian literary historian and translator.

Born into a well-read family in Frătăuții Vechi, in the Bukovina region of Austria-Hungary, he graduated from the Greek Orthodox Gymnasium in Suceava in 1912. He then entered Czernowitz University, interrupting his studies during World War I. Following the incorporation of Bukovina into Romania at the war's conclusion, he enrolled in the literature faculty of the University of Bucharest. In 1919, he obtained a magna cum laude degree in modern philology, with a speciality in Italian. From 1920 to 1923, he taught Italian and German at Bucharest's Matei Basarab High School.

Moving to Italy in 1923, he was a member of the Accademia di Romania for the next two years. In 1929, he became associate professor of Romanian language and literature at Sapienza University of Rome, rising to full professor in 1936. His work appeared in the publications of the Accademia, Ephemeris Dacoromana and Diplomatarium italicum; in Codrul Cosminului, Il giornale di politica e di letteratura, Roma, L’Europa Orientale, Termini, Revista germaniștilor români, Meridiano di Roma, Rassegna Italo-Romena, Revue de Culture, Européenne, Atti dell’Academia degli Arcadi, Le vie d’Oriente, Cahiers "Sextil Pușcariu", Il libro italiano del mondo, L’illustrazione toscana; in the bound volumes put out by the Romanian Academy, and in various Italian academic publications. A researcher in the traditional mode of cultural and literary relations between Romania and Italy, he published the studies L’Italia e le origini della nuova letteratura romena (1929), La stampa periodica romeno-italiana in Romania e in Italia (1937) and Saggi romeno-italo-ispanici (1943), as well as exegeses on the works of Ion Codru-Drăgușanu and Gheorghe Asachi. He died in Rome.
