= Modest Isopescu =

Romanian military officer (1895–1948)

Modest Isopescu (30 November 1895 – 17 October 1948) was an Austro-Hungarian-born Romanian officer, administrator and convicted war criminal.

Born in Frătăuții Vechi, in Austrian-ruled Bukovina, he entered the Austro-Hungarian Army in 1916 with the rank of reserve second lieutenant, and fought in World War I. He was promoted to captain in the Romanian Land Forces in 1923, he was advanced to major in 1934 and lieutenant colonel in 1939.

Romania entered World War II in June 1941 at the onset of Operation Barbarossa, under the Ion Antonescu regime. At that point, Isopescu was commander of a battalion in the gendarmerie, part of the Romanian 4th Army. He entered Chișinău with his battalion in July 1941, and in August he established a gendarmerie outpost in Bălți. He filled this position until October, when he was named prefect of Golta County in Transnistria Governorate. He remained as such until March 1944; meanwhile, at the end of 1942, he was transferred to the reserves. Under Isopescu's administration, the Golta district became a veritable "kingdom of death" for the Jews deported there.

In January 1945, several months after Antonescu was deposed in King Michael's Coup of August 1944, the Romanian government ordered the arrest of 65 persons, including Isopescu, for the "national disaster". Charged with war crimes, he was sentenced to death by the Bucharest People's Tribunal on 22 May. On 1 June this was commuted to hard labour for life. He died at Aiud Prison in 1948, of cancer and a liver abscess.
