= Societatea Academică Junimea =

Student organisation

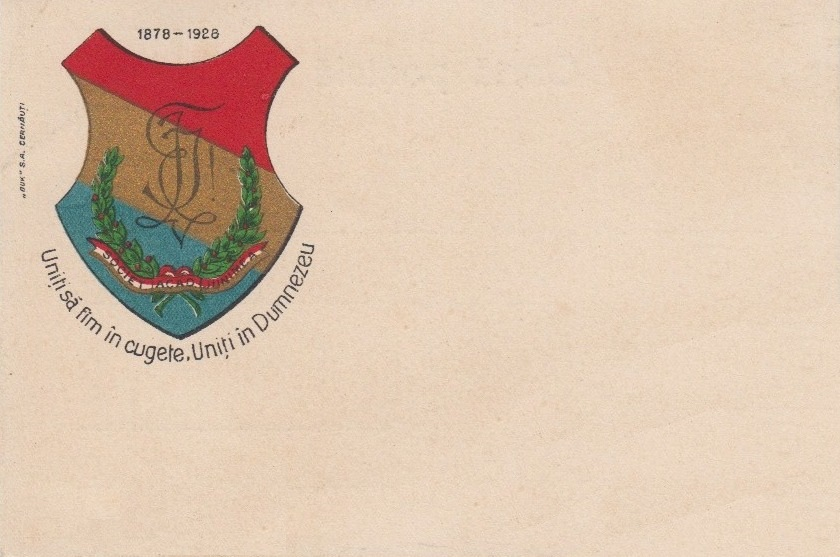
Coat of arms for Societatea Academica Junimea

Societatea Academică Junimea (Romanian for "Junimea Academic Society") was a society (Studentenverbindung) for Romanian students in the Austro-Hungarian city of Czernowitz, located in the Bukovina region of Cisleithania. The city was called Cernăuți after the region united with Romania in 1918, and today is Chernivtsi, Ukraine. The society operated between 1878 and 1938, spanning both the Austro-Hungarian and the Romanian periods.

== Founding and initial phase ==
Affiliated with Czernowitz University, Junimea was established on December 7, 1878. It carried forth the patriotic ideals proclaimed by Arboroasa, which the authorities had suppressed the previous November. Nearly all the members of the defunct society joined Junimea. The initial leadership included Dimitrie Onciul and president and Ciprian Porumbescu as secretary. Members habitually wore a ribbon patterned after the Romanian tricolor. They raised the flag on festive occasions, as well as an insignia inscribed Vivat, crescat, floreat Junimea.

A festive celebration was held in January 1879, following which Junimea began its activities, which were of a cultural and patriotic nature, with particular attention given to the cultural history of Romanians in Bukovina. By the end of 1880, the society had 39 regular members and 49 supporters, and focused on refinement of the Romanian language for the 1880–1881 academic year. Among those who visited the members were Gheorghe Sion, Titu Maiorescu and Agatha Bârsescu. In 1884, Junimea strongly lobbied against plans by the Austrian government to move the university to Brno.

Over the course of the 1880s, members consciously viewed themselves as upholding a Romanian culture imperiled by foreign domination, and propagated patriotic ideals. In towns and villages, they organized conferences devoted to national history and literature; musical, literary and theatrical evening performances; celebrations with folk songs and traditional dances; and commemorations of national heroes. By 1900, they were raising the tricolor at every occasion; marking 300 years since Michael the Brave briefly united the Romanian lands; and feasting in honor of Vasile Alecsandri, "the king of poetry". They actively combated the cosmopolitanism of the empire, instead promoting national pride.

== Early 20th century ==
At Junimea's 25th jubilee in 1904, guests arrived from the Romanian Old Kingdom, Transylvania, Banat and Crișana, as well as Aromanians from Macedonia. Meanwhile, local women donated a tricolor they had stitched together. The celebration happened to fall on the four hundredth anniversary of Stephen the Great's death, and the Junimea leadership was selected as part of the festive committee. Members were concerned with the economic well-being of Bukovina's Romanian peasants and craftsmen, and especially after 1892, helped create reading rooms in villages and cooperative banks. They also adopted a combative posture against the authorities, traveling to Cluj in 1894 to support the Transylvanian Memorandum defendants, campaigning in favor of the tricolor in 1898–1899, protesting against the Germanophilia of Czernowitz professors in 1900, electing Nicolae Iorga as an honorary member in 1908 when he was forbidden to enter Bukovina.

The society edited several publications: Tinerimea română, Junimea literară and Deșteptarea, as well as a number of short-lived satirical magazines. Its 30th anniversary in 1908 brought a number of prominent Romanian intellectuals, including Simion Mehedinți, Constantin Stere, Mihail Sadoveanu, Ștefan Octavian Iosif and Dimitrie Anghel, as well as delegates from the universities of Bucharest and Iași, and representatives from Romanian students in other provinces. By 1914, participants maintained ties with Romanian student societies in, among other places, Vienna, Graz, Munich, Budapest, Berlin and Kraków, as well as other cultural organizations in Bukovina.

Junimea's activity was interrupted upon the outbreak of World War I. The war's implication was quickly clear to its followers: upon the assassination of Archduke Franz Ferdinand, one member brought the news and exclaimed, "this is a war of liberation!" The society's flag was brought to the Romanian Academy in Bucharest. Half the leadership committee, including president Traian Popovici, left for the Old Kingdom right away, with others soon following. A number of members, Ion Grămadă among them, would eventually die fighting in the Romanian Army. Others, including Ion Nistor and George Tofan, publicized the difficult situation of Bukovina's Romanians while working within various cultural organizations, and worked to hasten Romania's entry into the war, which eventually happened in August 1916.
