= Sbiera =

Sbiera is a Romanian male surname. Notable people with the surname include:

- Ion G. Sbiera (1835–1916), Romanian folklorist
- Radu Sbiera (1876–1946), Romanian linguist and politician
