= Horodnic =

Horodnic may refer to one of two communes in Suceava County, Romania:

- Horodnic de Jos
- Horodnic de Sus
