= Botezatu =

Botezat or Botezatu is a Romanian surname. Notable people with the surname include:

- Eugen Botezat (1871–1964), Romanian zoologist
- Gheorghe Botezatu (1882–1940), Romanian-Russian American engineer
- Ionuț Botezatu (born 1987), Romanian rugby union player
