= Mayor of Chernivtsi =

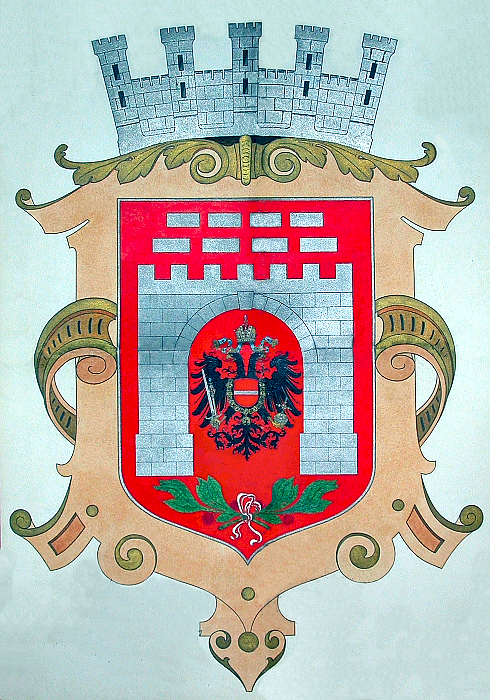
Crest of the city of Czernowitz 1908

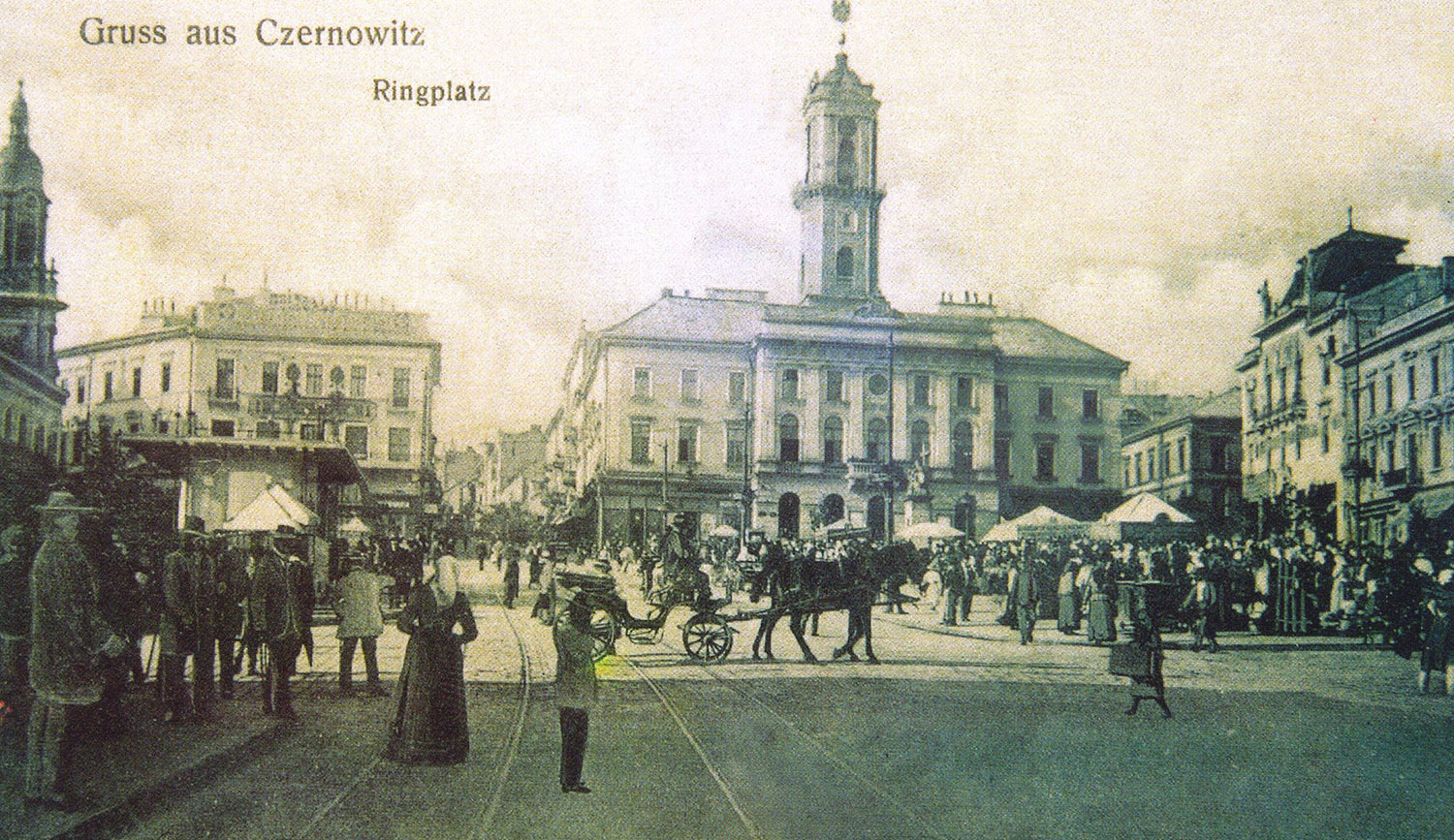
City Hall of Czernowitz about 1900

The following is a list of mayors of the city of Chernivtsi, Ukraine. It includes positions equivalent to mayor, such as chairperson of the city council executive committee.

== Austrian period ==
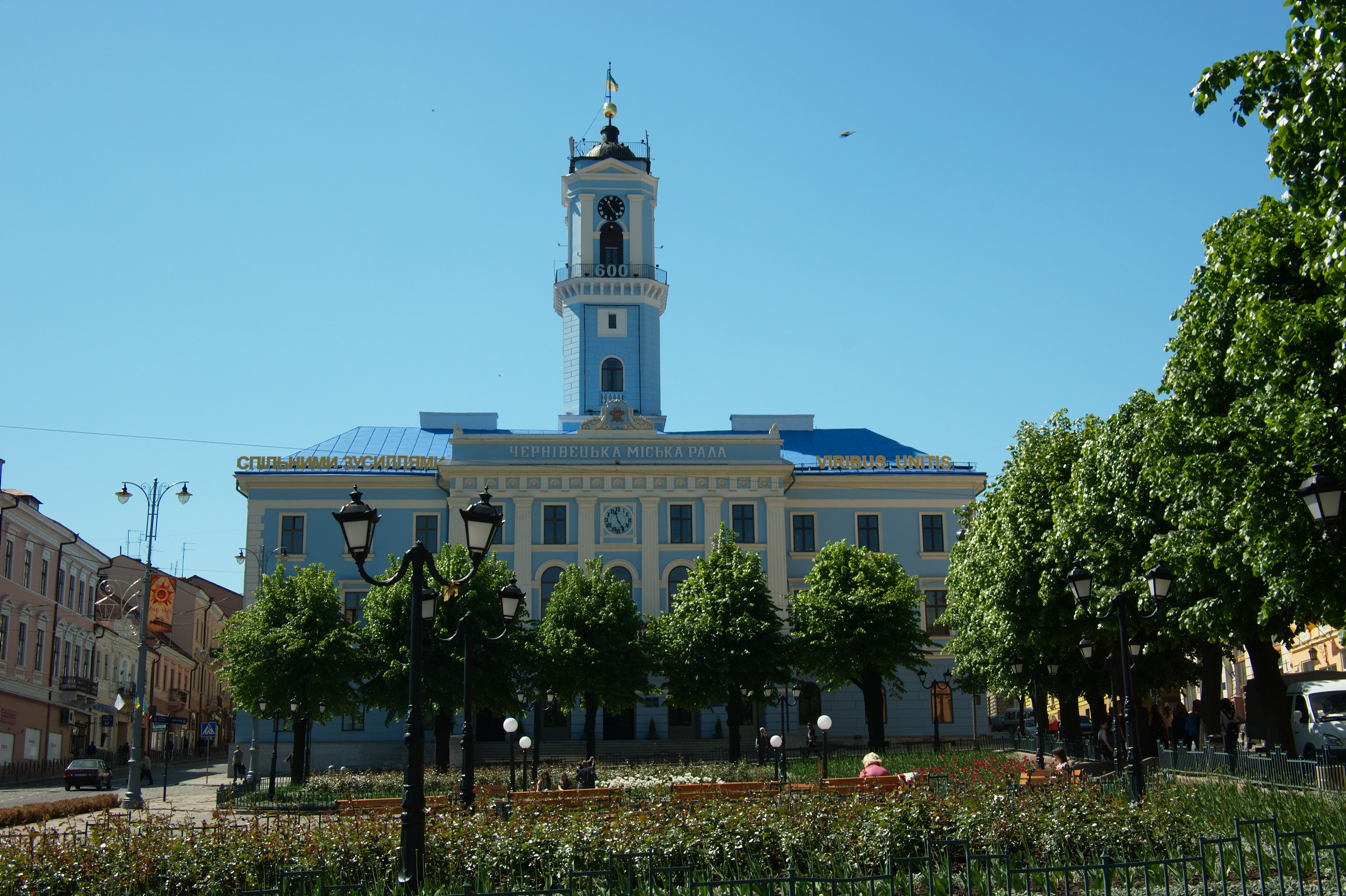
City Hall of Czernowitz today

=== Prehistory ===
In the period from 1780 to 1832 the town was ruled by so-called municipal judges. Usually they led the city only between one and two years. A longer tenure had only Joseph Hampel (1796–1800 and 1802–1811), Alexander Beldowicz (1811–1817) and the last city judge, Andreas Klug (1817–1832).

=== 1832: Regulation of local government, creating a magistrate ===
- Franz Lihotzky (1832–1848)
- Adalbert Suchanek (1848–1854)
- Josef Ritter von Ortynski (1854–1858)
- Josef Lepszy (1859–1861)
- Julius Hubrich (1861–1864)

=== 1864: Czernowitz becomes a town with its own statute ===
- Jakob Ritter von Petrowicz (1864–1866)
- Anton Freiherr Kochanowski von Stawczan (1866–1874)
- Otto Ambros Edler von Rechtenberg (1874–1880)
- Wilhelm Ritter von Klimesch (1881–1887)
- Anton Freiherr Kochanowski von Stawczan (1887–1905), since April 4, 1905 honorary mayor
- Dr. Eduard Reiss (1905–1907)
- Felix Freiherr Brewer von Fürth (1907–1913)
- Dr. Salo Edler von Weisselberger (1913–1918)

== Since 1918 ==
=== Period of the Western Ukrainian People's Republic ===
- Yosyp Bezpalko, 1918

=== Romanian period ===
- Gheorghe Șandru, 1918–1919
- Teofil Siminovici, 1919–1920
- Gheorghe Șandru, 1920–1922
- Nicu Flondor, 1922–1926
- Barbu Grigorovici, 1926
- Radu Sbiera, 1926–1927
- Romulus Cândea, 1927–1929
- Dimitrie Marmeluc, 1933–1938
- Nicu Flondor, 1938–1940
- Traian Popovici, 1941

=== Soviet period ===
- Alexey Ivanovich Nikitin, 1940–1941
- Anton Ivanovich Koshovyi, 1944–1945
- Alexander Nikiforovich Gritsay, 1945–1948
- Ivan Fedorovych Kozachuk, 1948–1949
- Polikarp Arkhipovich Kotko, 1949–1950
- Viktor Ivanovich Gutafel, 1950–1954
- Mikhail Ivanovich Mikhailovsky, 1954–1959
- Petro Petrovych Donchenko, 1959–1964
- Vasil Petrovich Tolmach, 1964–1972
- Volodymyr Fedorovych Dotsiuk, 1972–1985
- Pavlo Mykhailovych Kaspruk, 1985–1991
- Georgy Dmitrovich Grodetsky, 1991

=== Modernity ===
- Viktor Pavliuk, 1991–2004
- Mykola Fedoruk, 1994–2011
- Oleksiy Kaspruk, 2014–2020
- Roman Klichuk, 2020-present

== Gallery ==
Mayors during Austrian period

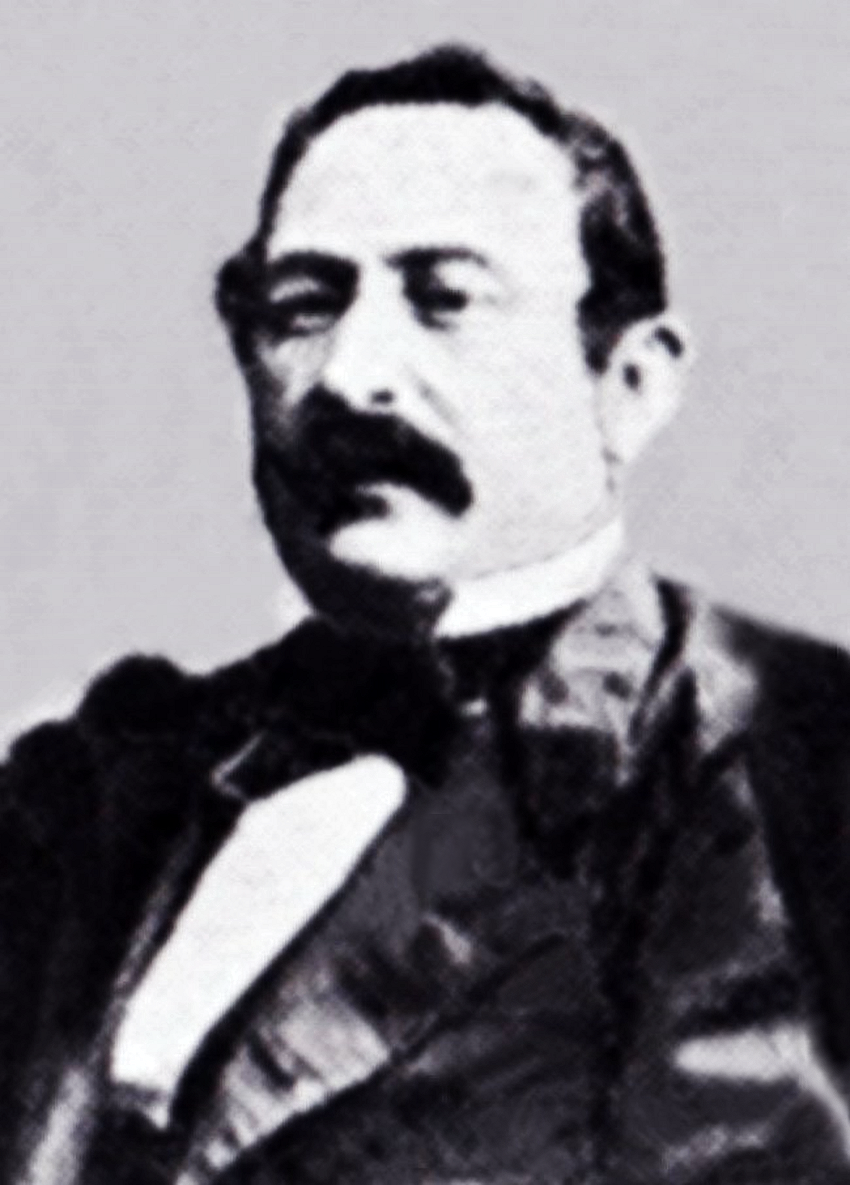
Jakob von Petrowicz

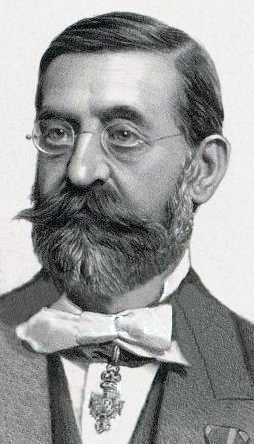
Anton Kochanowski von Stawczan

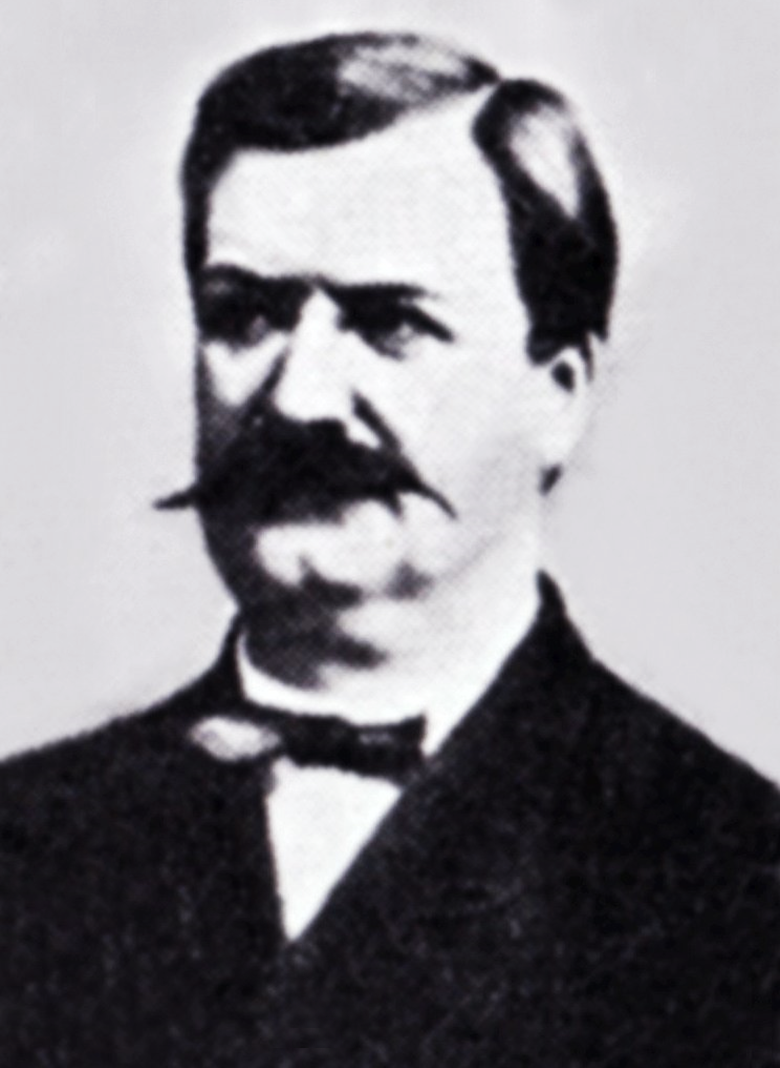
Otto Ambros von Rechtenberg

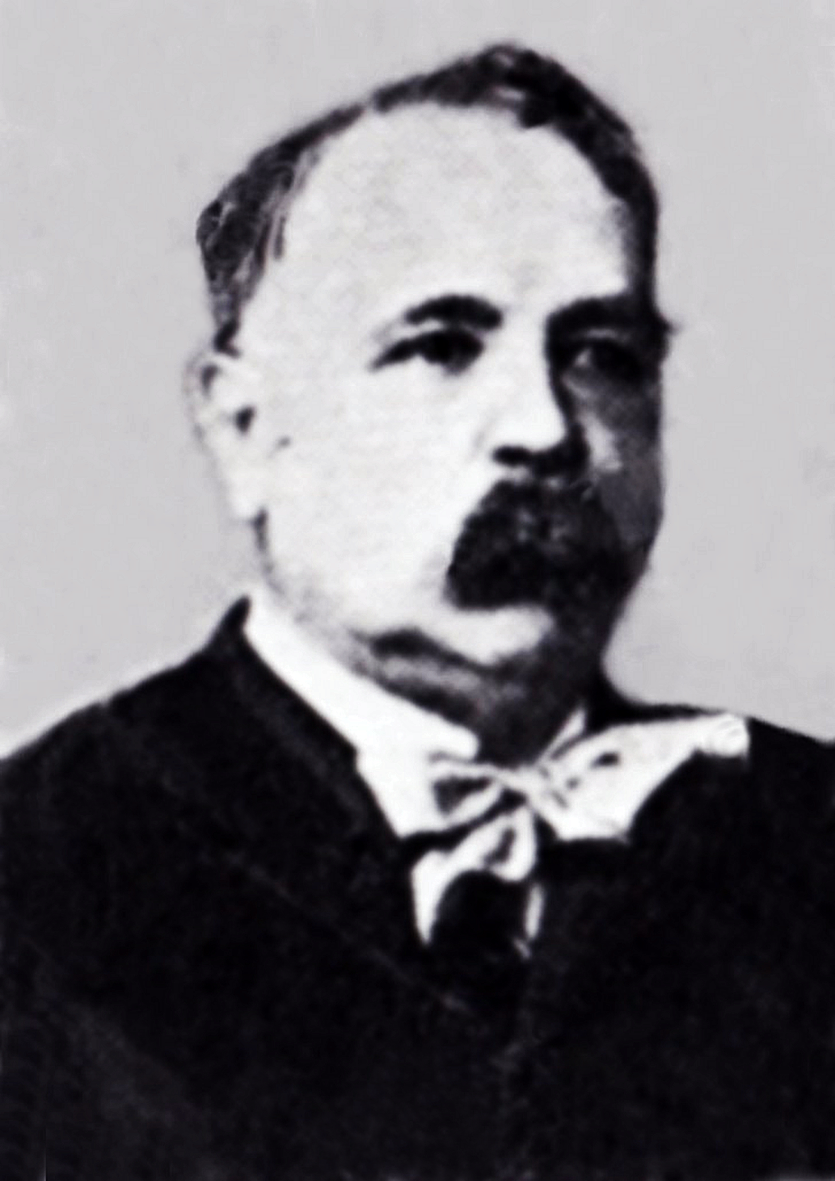
Wilhelm von Klimesch

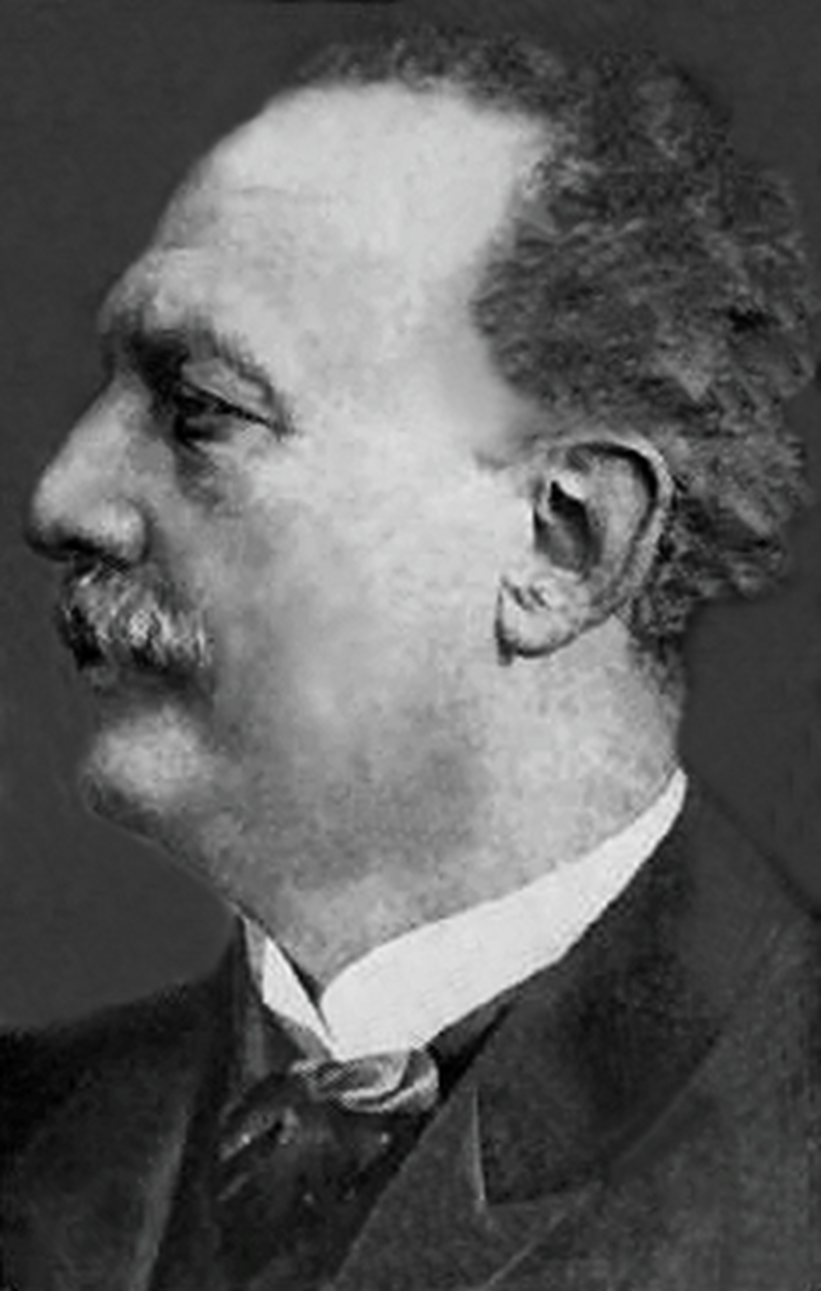
Eduard Reiss

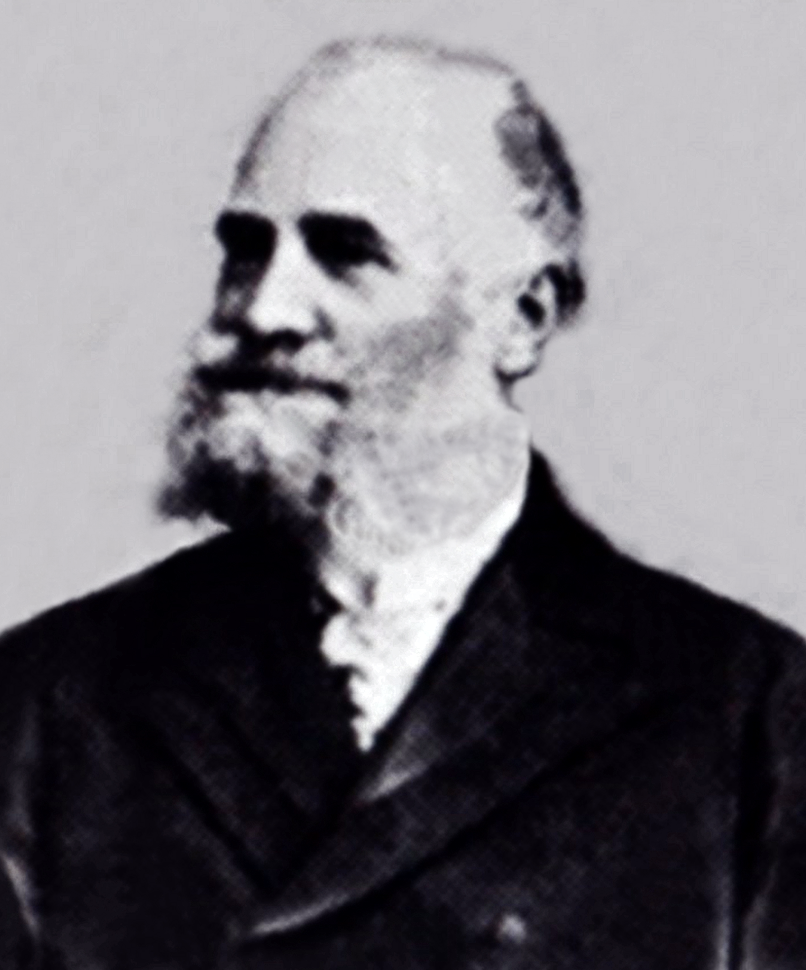
Felix Brewer von Fürth

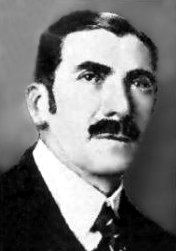
Salo von Weisselberger

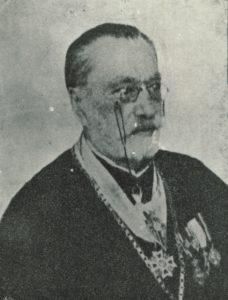
Gheorghe Șandru

Ukrainian mayors of Chernivtsi

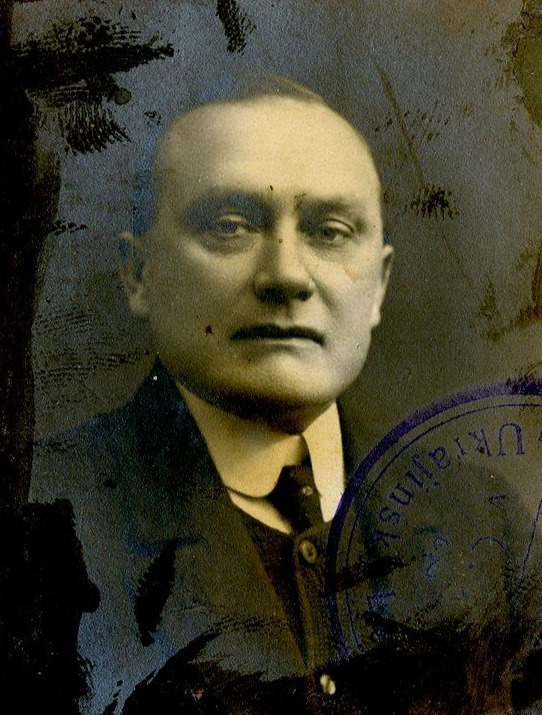
Yosyp Bezpalko

== See also ==
- Chernivtsi history
- History of Chernivtsi (in Ukrainian)
