= Aurel Țurcan =

Austro-Hungarian-born Romanian politician, engineer and businessman

Aurel Țurcan (May 16, 1876–October 13, 1939) was an Austro-Hungarian-born Romanian politician, engineer and businessman.

Born in Cajvana, his parents were the Orthodox priest Vasile Țurcan and his wife Eufrosina. After graduating from the State Higher Gymnasium in Rădăuți in 1895, he attended the silviculture faculty of Vienna University, which he completed in 1899. He belonged to the România Jună Academic Society, serving as its vice president from 1897 to 1899. He then settled in Cernăuți, working as an engineer for the Bukovina Orthodox church fund. He became an active supporter of Societatea Academică Junimea, making significant donations. In 1908, he joined the Christian Social Party of Bukovina. From 1911 to 1918, he represented Rădăuți in the Diet of Bukovina, serving as the province's deputy marshal and later captain.

In October 1918, Țurcan joined the Romanian National Council of Bukovina. In mid-November, he entered the provisional government formed by this body, as secretary of public works. Late that month, he took part in the general congress that voted for union with Romania. Within Greater Romania, he sat in the Assembly of Deputies during two parliaments, representing the People's Party. He was named liquidator of Austrian assets in Bukovina. By 1919, he was director of the church fund, head of Holzindustrie A. G. Bucovina firm and president of the provincial credit union. He was an officer of the Order of the Star of Romania. He died in Cernăuți.
