= Eudoxiu Hurmuzachi National College =

Coordinates: 47.8416°N 25.9238°E

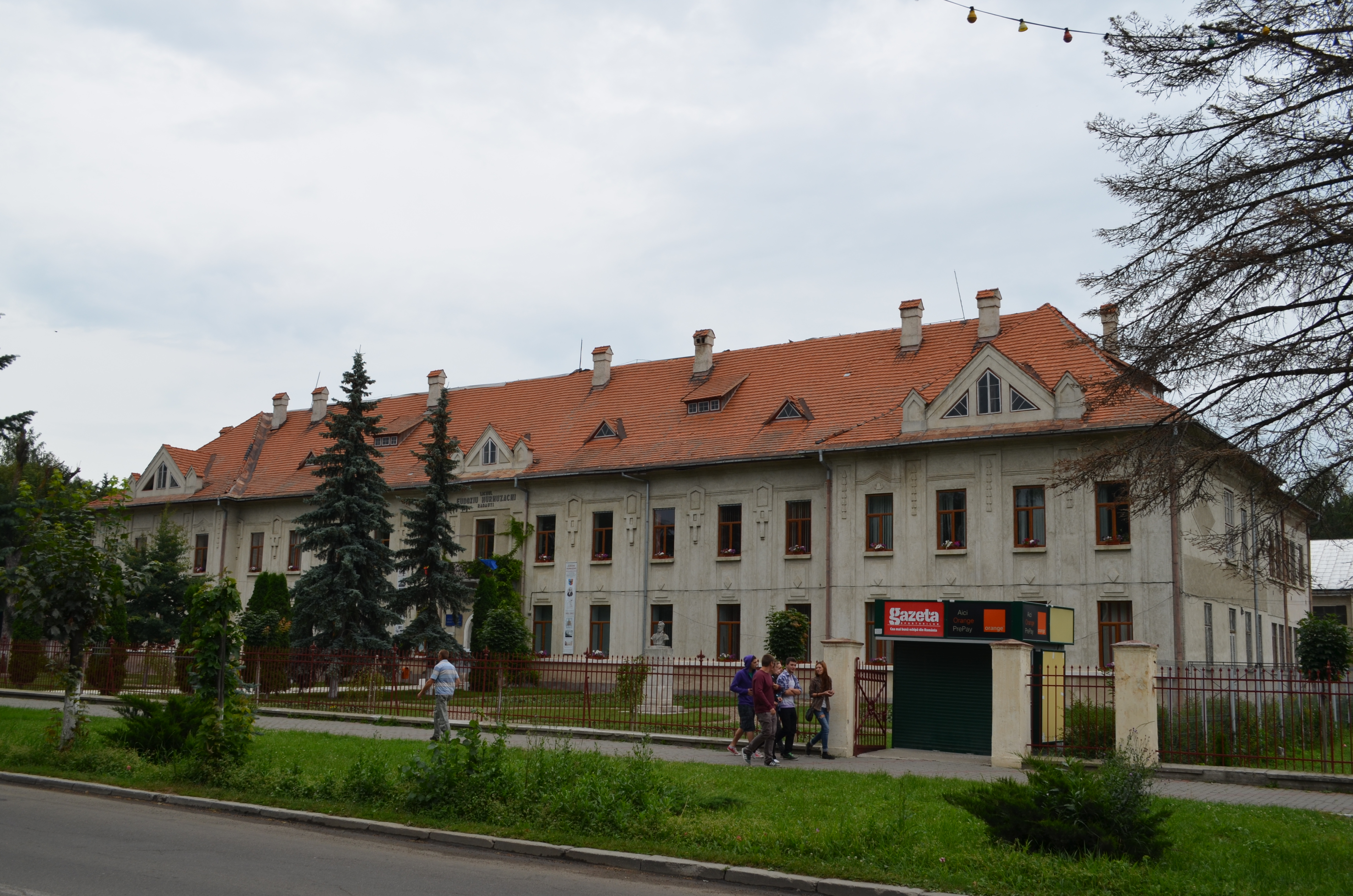
Eudoxiu Hurmuzachi National College

Eudoxiu Hurmuzachi National College (Romanian: Colegiul Național Eudoxiu Hurmuzachi) is a high school located at 5 Bucovinei Way, Rădăuți, Romania.

In 1865, a fund was established for opening a secondary school in Rădăuți. In 1871, the fund administrators received imperial approval for establishing a Realgymnasium with instruction in German; at the time, the area was part of the Duchy of Bukovina within Austria-Hungary. A military hospital on a stud farm was selected as the building. Classes opened in October 1872; Ernst Rudolf Neubauer was the first principal. In 1878, the institution became a classical high school. Upper-level (Obergymnasium) courses were added in 1880. The first baccalaureate degrees were awarded in 1885. Classes in Romanian were introduced in 1910. The following year saw the founding of a school library, a chapel, gymnasium, art room and drawing club. Higher-level courses in Romanian were offered for the 1913-1914 year; in April 1914, the Romanian courses were formalized as a separate section.

During World War I, Bukovina was the site of heavy fighting, with Russian troops repeatedly occupying Rădăuți. The school was closed and used for military purposes, while older students were drafted and sent to the front. Classes were able to reopen in May 1918. The first Romanian-language baccalaureate was given in September, shortly before the union of Bukovina with Romania. In June 1919, the Romanian section declared its independence and became a high school named after historian Eudoxiu Hurmuzachi. Romanian classes became the default, with German ones held in parallel; both had a single administration. Until 1923, a girls’ section operated under the same leadership, as the principal of the local girls’ high school refused to change over to a Romanian school. A school magazine first appeared in 1924–1929, and again in 1934 and 1940.

During World War II, the faculty were drafted, and courses were taught by the female teachers from the girls’ high school. Part of the property was used as a military depot. The 1943-1944 year ended early due to the approach of the Eastern Front. In the spring of 1944, the archive was evacuated to Turda, while the school itself set up in the nearby village of Luna. Part of the documents were destroyed when the Turda railway station was bombed. In 1948, the new communist regime dropped the name of Hurmuzachi and reduced the educational offering to eleven grades; from 1953 to 1957, there were ten grades, with a largely technical focus. Hurmuzachi's name was restored for the centennial in 1972. The institution became a technical high school in 1976, with twelve grades from 1984. In 1990–1991, following the Romanian Revolution, the technical orientation was shelved and a full range of subjects reintroduced. The school was declared a national college in 1999.

The school building, from 1863, is listed as a historic monument by Romania's Ministry of Culture and Religious Affairs.

== Alumni ==
- Eugen Botezat
- Traian Brăileanu
- Zvi Laron
- Florea Lupu
- Ion Nistor
- Virgil Percec
- Aurel Țurcan
- Iulian Vesper
