= Terebleche =

Village in Chernivtsi Oblast, Ukraine

Coordinates: 48°01′N 26°04′E

Terebleche (Ukrainian: Тереблече; Romanian: Tereblecea; German: Tereblestie or Deutsch-Terebleschti) is a village in Chernivtsi Raion, Chernivtsi Oblast, Ukraine. It hosts the administration of Terebleche rural hromada, one of the hromadas of Ukraine.

Until 18 July 2020, Terebleche belonged to Hlyboka Raion. The raion was abolished in July 2020 as part of the administrative reform of Ukraine, which reduced the number of raions of Chernivtsi Oblast to three. The area of Hlyboka Raion was merged into Chernivtsi Raion. In 2001, 81.33% of the inhabitants spoke Romanian as their native language, while 13.81% spoke Ukrainian.

== Natives ==
- Ivo Bobul (born 1953), Ukrainian singer of Romanian ethnicity
- Eugen Botezat (1871–1964), Austro-Hungarian-born Romanian zoologist
