= Dimitrie Prelipcean =

- Dimitrie Prelipcean
- Born: November 18, 1927; Horodnic de Jos, Suceava County, Kingdom of Romania
- Died: July 29, 1987 (aged 59); Câmpina, Prahova County, Socialist Republic of Romania

Dimitrie Prelipcean (November 18, 1927 – July 29, 1987) was a Romanian writer, whose works trace the history of his native Bukovina in the wake of World War II and the early years of the Communist regime.

He was born in Horodnic de Jos, Suceava County.

== Works ==
- Drumuri şi popasuri
- A fost odată
- Iubiri neîmplinite
