= Virgil Percec =

Romanian chemist

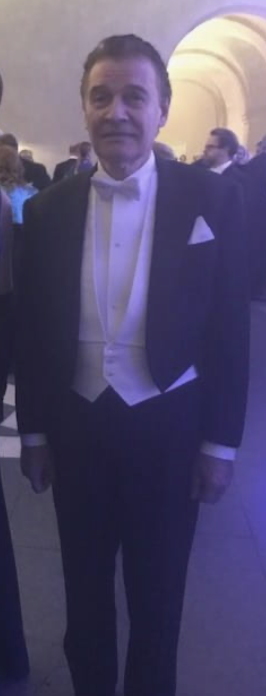
- Born: December 8, 1946 (age 79); Siret, Suceava County, Kingdom of Romania

Academic background
- Education: Polytechnic University in Iași (BA, 1969; PhD, 1976)
- Website: web.sas.upenn.edu/percecgroup/professor-percec/

Virgil Percec (born December 8, 1946) is a Romanian-American chemist and P. Roy Vagelos Chair and Professor of Chemistry at the University of Pennsylvania. Expert in organic, macromolecular and supramolecular chemistry including self-assembly, biological membrane mimics, complex chiral systems, and catalysis. Pioneered the fields of liquid crystals with complex architecture, supramolecular dendrimers, Janus dendrimers and glycodendrimers, organic Frank-Kasper phases and quasicrystals, supramolecular polymers, helical chirality, Ni-catalyzed cross-coupling and multiple living and self-interrupted polymerizations. Most of these concepts were inspired by Nature and biological principles.

== Life ==
=== Early life ===
Percec was born in December 1946 in Siret, Romania. His father, Traian, was a schoolteacher and painter; his mother was named Virginia. Virgil attended Eudoxiu Hurmuzachi High School in Rădăuți.

=== Education ===
Percec received his BS in Organic and Macromolecular Chemistry at the Polytechnic University in Iași in 1969 and his PhD in 1976 at the Institute of Macromolecular Chemistry in Iași where he had Cristofor Simionescu as a mentor. In 1981 he defected from his native country and after short postdoctoral stays at the University of Freiburg in Germany (July 1981 with H.-J. Cantow) and University of Akron, US (August 1981 to March 1982 with J. P. Kennedy) he joined the Department of Macromolecular Science of Case Western Reserve University (CWRU) in Cleveland, US in March 1982 as an assistant professor. He was promoted to associate professor in 1984 and to professor in 1986. In 1991 he became director of Materials Research Science and Engineering Centers (MRSEC) and in 1993, he was awarded the Leonard Case Jr. Chair at CWRU. In 1999 he moved to the University of Pennsylvania in Philadelphia as P. Roy Vagelos Chair and Professor of Chemistry. He has been repeatedly a visiting professor at the Universities of Freiburg, Ulm and at the Max Planck Institute for Polymer Research in Mainz (all in Germany) and at the Royal Institute of Technology in Stockholm, Sweden.

=== Personal life ===
Percec and his wife, Simona, have a daughter Ivona Percec. She earned a double major in Molecular Biology and Medieval History from Princeton University and received an MD and PhD in Genetics from University of Pennsylvania, where she joined the faculty and surgery department.

== Research ==
Percec has made scientific contributions in diverse areas, including the discovery of all helical stereoisomers of polyphenylacetylene, their interconversion and intramolecular electrocyclization with applications in chiral separation, sensors, membranes, molecular machines, the discovery of liquid crystals based on conformational isomerism: polyethers, poly(vinyl ether)s, macrocyclics, covalent and supramolecular dendrimers the discovery of self-assembling dendrons, dendrimers and dendronized polymers; and the creation of helical rod-like and spherical viruses mimics. He generated the first organic Frank-Kasper phases and quasicrystals. He revealed double-helices disregarding chirality and deracemization in crystal state, designed the sequence-rearrangement concept to transform dynamic racemic (atactic) into homochiral (isotactic) supramolecular polymers and demonstrated acceleration of self-assembly and disassembly by fluorine and fluorous phase. His discovery of self-interrupted and self-accelerated iterative organic synthesis, polymerizations and living polymerizations produced the first monodisperse polymers by noniterative synthesis. More recently, he uncovered biological membrane mimics from Janus dendrimers, glycodendrimers and ionizable dendrimers; determined they self-assemble into monodisperse artificial cell-like mimics, co-assemble with bacterial and human cells, and generate one component mRNA delivery systems for virus vaccines and drugs. He is also known for the methodologies he developed for organic, macromolecular and supramolecular synthesis: replacement of Pd with Ni in cross-coupling reactions, the concepts of mixed-ligands and catalytic solvents, phase-transfer catalyzed living condensation polymerization, new mechanisms for living polymerization of acetylenes, single-electron-transfer mediated organic and polymerization reactions including living polymerizations. Percec discovered that the one-component multifunctional sequence-defined amphiphilic Janus dendrimer is an efficient delivery system for mRNA. Designed and synthesized several libraries containing sequence-defined multifunctional ionizable amphiphilic Janus dendrimer (IAJD) by an accelerated modular-orthogonal methodology. Demonstrated they co-assemble with mRNA into dendrimersome nanoparticles (DNPs) by a simple injection method rather than by the complex microfluidic technology. These sequence-defined IAJDs and DNPs are being employed to elucidate the mechanisms of encapsulation and release of mRNA from supramolecular virus-like assemblies and for the production of vaccines and drugs.

== Awards and achievements ==
Percec is the author of more than 800 scientific articles, 20 books and special issues and listed as inventor of at least 80 patents. Percec presented over 1200 endowed, plenary and invited lectures. He has served as the Editor of Journal of Polymer Science: Part A: Polymer Chemistry, Advances in Polymer Science and Book Series “Liquid Crystals”. He serves on Editorial and Advisory Scientific Boards of 24 International Journals, and of the advisory boards of many Academic and Industrial Institutions. Percec organized numerous National and International Symposia including Gordon Conferences, and IUPAC meetings. In 2018, Percec was listed as "Global Highly Cited Researches" by Clarivate Analytics for world-class researches and their exceptional research performance based on multiple highly cited papers that rank in the top 1% by citations for field and year in Web of Sciences. In 2016, 2015, and 2014 he was listed as "One of The World's Most Influential Scientific Minds of our Time" by Thomson Reuters. Percec delivered over 1400 plenary endowed lectures including: the Raychem Lecturer, Chemistry Department, University of California, Berkeley, CA (1996); The 4th Aggarwal Lecturer in Polymer Science, Chemistry Department, Cornell University, NY (1997); The Inaugural Woodward Lecturer "Frontiers in Chemical Sciences", Harvard University (2004); the 7th Rohm and Haas Lecture at the University of California, Berkeley (2005); the Lecturer of the Swiss Chemical Society (2008); Invited Lecture at Kekule Institute of Organic Chemistry and Biochemistry at the University of Bonn (2010); the Inaugural Kavli Foundation Innovations in Chemistry Lecture and Award, American Chemical Society (2011); The 8th International Dendrimer Symposium (2013); the Inaugural Aldrich lecture at Massachusetts Institute of Technology (2015); Ben-Gurion University of the Negev, Israel, Department of Chemistry and the Faculty of Natural Science's Distinguished Scientist Visitor and Lecturers (2016); IVA 100: Centennial Jubilee Workshop of the Royal Swedish Academy of Engineering Sciences (2019). Percec is an Honorary Foreign Member of the Romanian Academy (1993), Doctor Honoris Causa of University of Athens (Greece), Polytechnic University Iasi (Romania) since 2007 and of Polytechnic University, Bucharest (2016). He is an Honorary Member of the Israel Chemical Society (2009) and of the Romanian Society of Chemistry and "Petru Poni" Medal of the Romanian Society of Chemistry (2014). Percec educated over 300 PhD and postdoctoral students with more than 70 of them being in faculty positions.

=== Awards ===
- 2024 Elected Member of the American Academy of Arts and Sciences (AAAS) https://www.amacad.org/.
- 2020 Elected Foreign Member of Academia Europaea.
- 2016, 2000, 1995, 1990, National Science Foundation Research Award for Creativity in Research.
- 2015, "Cristofor Simionescu" Award for Excellence in Macromolecular Chemistry- The Inaugural American Chemical Society in Collaboration with the Romanian International Chapter.
- 2013, The Joseph and Josephine Rabinowitz Award for Excellence in Research at The University of Pennsylvania School of Dental Medicine.
- 2013, Honorary Foreign Member of the Royal Swedish Academy of Engineering Sciences IVA.
- 2012 and 1997, Humboldt Research Award for Senior US Scientists Alexander von Humboldt Foundation
- 2008, The Herman F. Mark Medal and The Polymer Award from the Austrian Research Institute for Chemistry and Technology, Vienna, Austria.
- 2008, The International Award and Silver Medal of the Society of Polymer Science, Japan.
- 2007, International Award of The Society of Polymer Science, Japan (SPSJ).
- 2005, Staudinger-Durrer Medal, ETH, Zurich, Switzerland.
- 2004, American Chemical Society Award in Polymer Chemistry.
- 2002, Polymer Technology Netherland (PTN) Award from the Netherlands.
