= Cajvana =

- Town
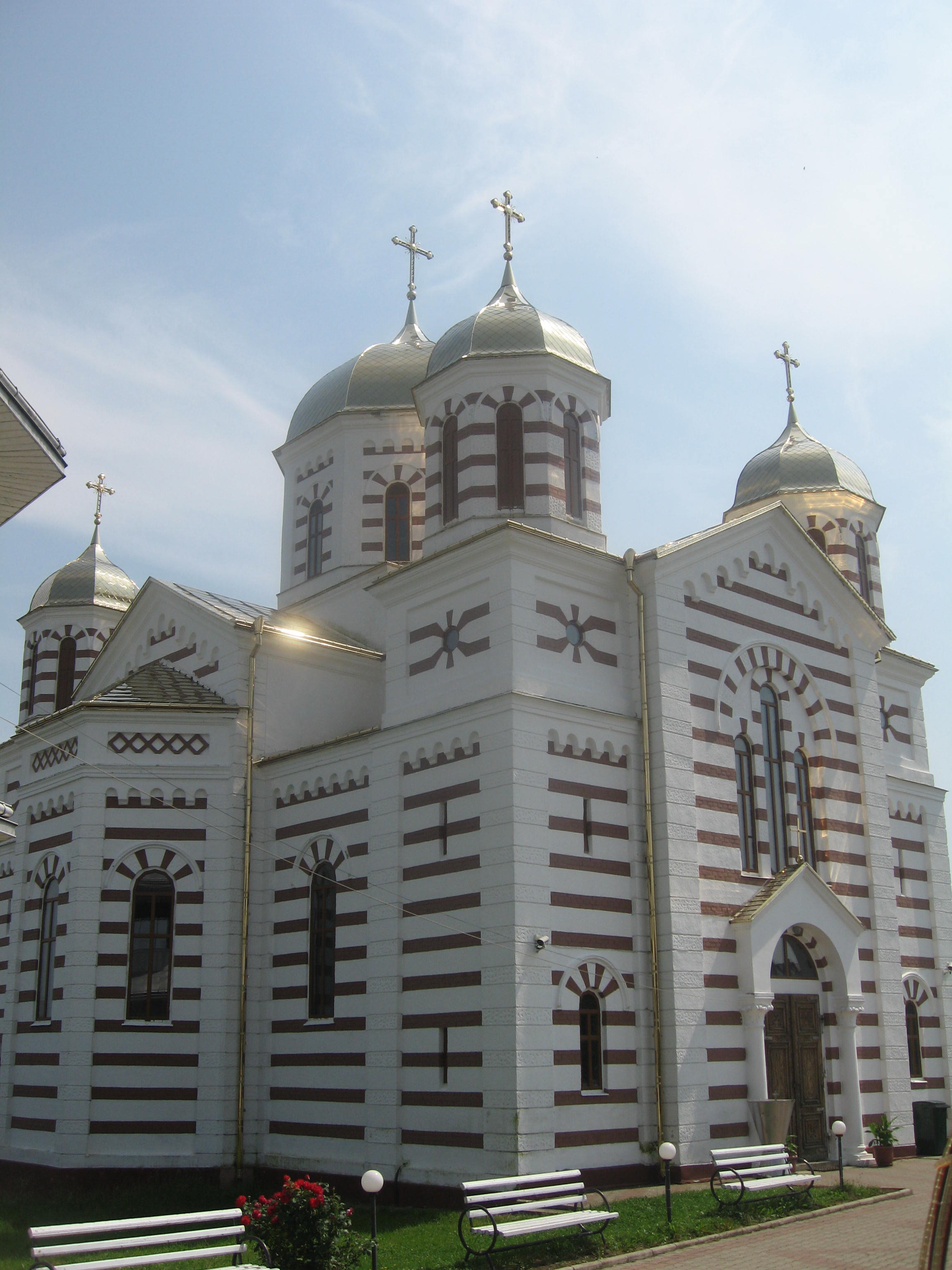
- Church of the Archangels in Cajvana

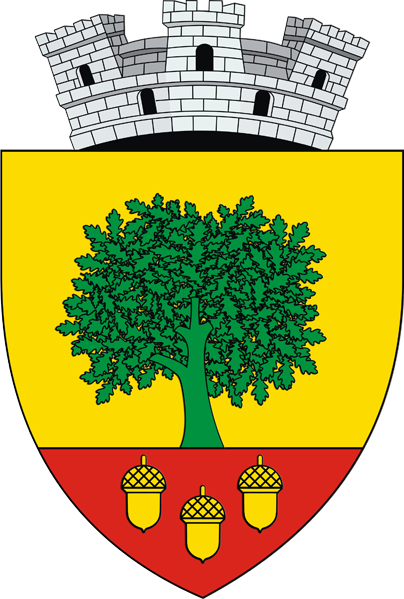
- Coat of arms

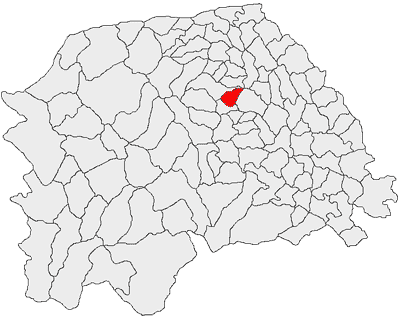
- Location in Suceava County

- Location in Romania
- Coordinates: 47°42′16″N 25°58′10″E
- Country: Romania
- County: Suceava

Government
  - Mayor (2024–2028): Gheorghe Tomăscu (PSD)
- Area: 24.83 km^{2} (9.59 sq mi)
- Elevation: 408 m (1,339 ft)
- Population (2021-12-01): 9,139
  - Density: 368.1/km^{2} (953.3/sq mi)
- Time zone: UTC+02:00 (EET)
  - Summer (DST): UTC+03:00 (EEST)
- Postal code: 727100
- Area code: (+40) 02 30
- Vehicle reg.: SV
- Website: www.cajvana.ro

Historical population
Year	Pop.	±%
2002	7,263	—
2011	6,812	−6.2%
2021	9,139	+34.2%
Source: Census data

Cajvana (German: Keschwana) is a town in Suceava County, northeastern Romania. It is situated in the historical regions of Bukovina and Western Moldavia. Cajvana is the twelfth-largest urban settlement in the county, with a population of 9,139 inhabitants, according to the 2021 census. It was declared a town in 2004, along with seven other localities in Suceava County. One village, Codru, is administered by the town.

Cajvana is located at a distance of 36 kilometres (22 miles) away from Suceava, the county capital. The town is known for its legendary oak tree, which dates from the time of Moldavian ruler Stephen the Great (1457–1504). Despite being a town, Cajvana has a rural aspect and the main occupation of the inhabitants is agriculture. The locality was severely affected by the European floods in 2005.

== Administration and local politics ==
=== Town council ===
The town's current local council has the following political composition, according to the results of the 2024 Romanian local elections:

Party	Seats	Current Council
Social Democratic Party (PSD)	7	
People's Movement Party (PMP)	3	
National Liberal Party (PNL)	3	
Alliance for the Union of Romanians (AUR)	3	
Law, Education, Unity Party (PLEU)	1	

== Natives ==
- Maria Băsescu (born 1951), First Lady of Romania from 2004 to 2014
- Aurel Țurcan (1876–1939), politician, engineer, and businessman
