= Iulian Vesper =

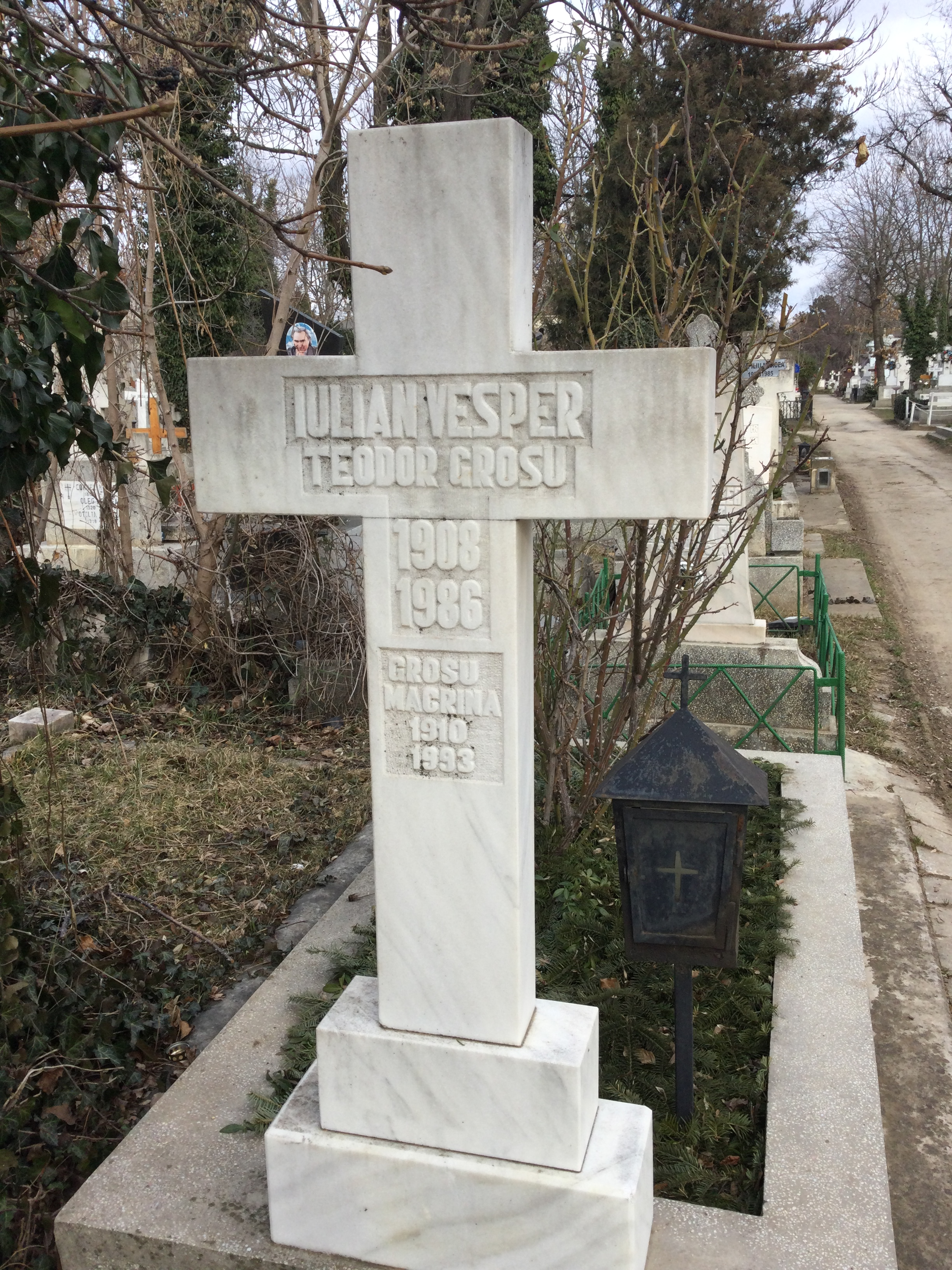
Grave in Bellu Cemetery

Iulian Vesper (pen name of Teodor C. Grosu; November 22, 1908–February 11, 1986) was an Austro-Hungarian-born Romanian poet and prose writer.

Born in Horodnic de Sus, Suceava County, in the Bukovina region, his parents were Constantin Grosu, a farmer and church singer, and his wife Teodosia (née Prelipcean). After attending primary school in his native village, he went to the classical section of Eudoxiu Hurmuzachi High School in Rădăuți, graduating in 1927. The same year, he enrolled in the literature faculty of Cernăuți University, but transferred to the literature and philosophy faculty of the University of Bucharest, graduating in 1933. He was editor-in-chief of Glasul Bucovinei newspaper in 1933–1934, then editor until 1937. He worked as cabinet head at the Labor and Social Protection Ministry (1934-1942); translator, editor and press secretary at the Press Directorate (1944-1949); editor at Agerpres (1949-1950); and proofreader at the State Publishing House for Literature and Art (1951-1956).

Vesper's published debut took the form of poems that appeared in his high school magazine in 1924. His early poetry situated him within the Iconar group of Bukovina poets, who advocated metaphysical verses in an avant-garde style. His work appeared in Mircea Streinul's 1938 anthology Poeți tineri bucovineni. He published volumes of poetry (Echinox în odăjdii, 1933; Constelații, 1935; Poeme de Nord, 1937; Izvoare, 1942; Poezii, 1968; Ascultând nopțile, 1972; Al treilea orizont, 1979), historical fiction (Viața lui Mihai Viteazul, 1939; Chipuri domnești, 1944) and novels (Primăvara în țara fagilor, 1938; Glasul, 1957). His translations included Russian tales, Vasily Belov, the Kalevala and Louis Hémon. Aside from his hermetic poems and those which display a somewhat affected messianism, Vesper's poetry, innately romantic, is undoubtedly valuable. It reflects an authentic experience of awe in the face of death and its projection into a fabulous realm.
