= Mykola Fedoruk =

Ukrainian politician (1954–2025)

- Микола Федорук
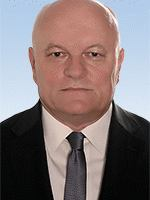
- Fedoruk in 2012

Mayor of Chernivtsi
- In office July 1994 – March 2011
- Preceded by: Viktor Pavliuk
- Succeeded by: Oleksiy Kaspruk

People's Deputy of Ukraine
- In office 12 December 2012 – 29 August 2019

Personal details
- Born: Mykola Trokhymovych Fedoruk; 20 March 1954 Pisochne, Volyn Oblast, Ukrainian SSR, USSR
- Died: 7 May 2025 (aged 71)
- Party: Batkivshchyna; People's Front
- Education: Lviv Polytechnic Institute
- Occupation: Engineer

Mykola Trokhymovych Fedoruk (Ukrainian: Мико́ла Трохи́мович Федору́к; 20 March 1954 – 7 May 2025) was a Ukrainian politician. A member of Batkivshchyna and the People's Front, he served as mayor of Chernivtsi from 1994 to 2011 and was a member of the Verkhovna Rada from 2012 to 2019.

Fedoruk died on 7 May 2025, at the age of 71.
