= Horodnic de Sus =

- Commune
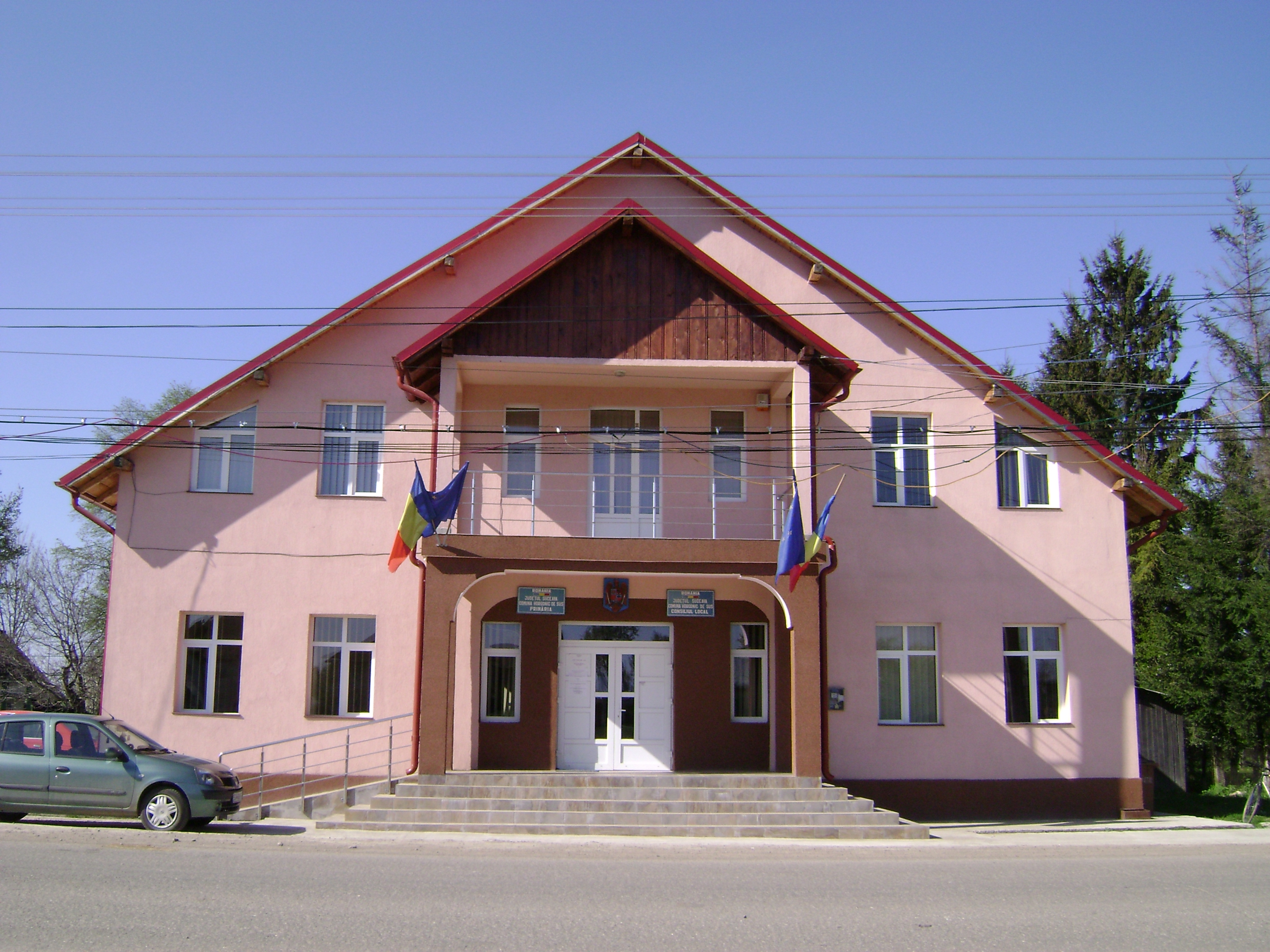
- Town hall of Horodnic de Sus

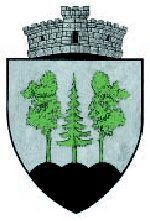
- Coat of arms

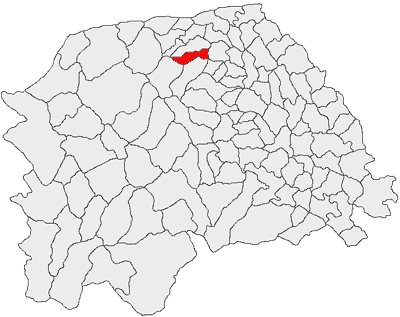
- Location in Suceava County

- Location in Romania
- Coordinates: 47°50′N 25°50′E
- Country: Romania
- County: Suceava

Government
  - Mayor (2024–2028): Valentin Petrică Luța (PNL)
- Area: 56 km^{2} (22 sq mi)
- Elevation: 417 m (1,368 ft)
- Population (2021-12-01): 5,407
  - Density: 97/km^{2} (250/sq mi)
- Time zone: UTC+02:00 (EET)
  - Summer (DST): UTC+03:00 (EEST)
- Postal code: 727305
- Area code: (+40) x30
- Vehicle reg.: SV
- Website: horodnicdesus.ro

Horodnic de Sus (German: Ober Horodnik or Oberhorodnik) is a commune located in Suceava County, in the historical region of Bukovina, northeastern Romania. It is composed of a single village, namely Horodnic de Sus. A separate commune until 1950, it was a village of Horodnic Commune until 2003, when Horodnic de Sus was split off to form a separate commune and Horodnic was renamed Horodnic de Jos.

== Natives ==
- Iulian Vesper
