= Eugen Botezat =

Zoologist in Romania

Eugen C. Botezat (March 15, 1871–December 1964) was an Austro-Hungarian-born Romanian zoologist.

== Biography ==
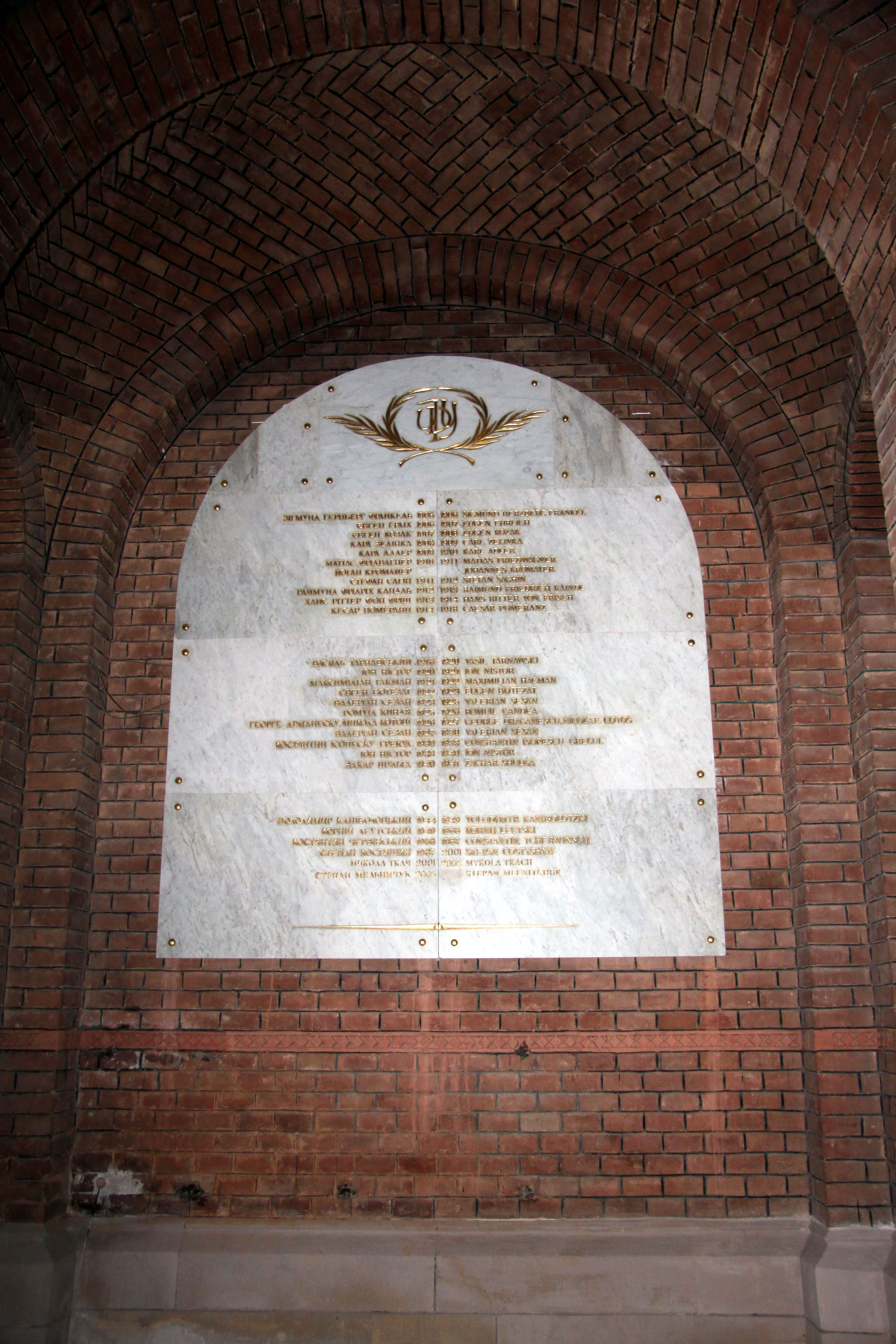
Plaque dedicated to the rectors of the University of Chernivtsi, also mentioning Eugen Botezat

Born in Tereblecea, in Austrian-ruled Bukovina, his parents Constantin and Domnica, were teachers. He attended three grades of primary school in his native village from 1877 to 1879, followed by a fourth in Siret, where he learned German. Botezat went to high school in Czernowitz (Cernăuți) and Suceava, graduating in 1892. He studied natural sciences at the German University in Prague. In 1897, he became a teaching assistant at its zoology institute; a year later, he received a doctorate. From 1898 to 1919 he taught natural sciences at the normal school in Czernowitz, paying particular attention to students from rural backgrounds like himself. In 1907, he became assistant professor of histology at Czernowitz University, and also performed laboratory research on the comparative anatomy and histology of sensory organs in vertebrates. In 1913, upon being nominated by Ion Th. Simionescu, he was elected a corresponding member of the Romanian Academy. During World War I, when the local schools were closed due to the Russian occupation, he taught at the high school in Rădăuți. In 1918, he formed part of the Romanian National Council that approved Bukovina's union with Romania.

In 1919, soon after Bukovina came under Romanian administration, he became a full professor of zoology at Cernăuți University, remaining as such until retiring in 1938. During this period, he was dean of the philosophy and then of the natural sciences faculty, as well as university rector from 1922 to 1923. His scientific activity was known abroad as well as domestically, with many of his studies appearing in German. He made important advances in the histology of sensory organs in mammals and birds, publishing 34 articles on morphology, physiological anatomy and cynegetics. His discoveries pertained to the nerve endings in the tactile corpuscles of mammals, taste buds in birds, the neurofibrillary structure of nerve endings, the double innervation of striated muscle tissue and the epidermis, and glandular activity in sensory cells. Botezat's ecological studies, undertaken during his many walks through the woods of Bukovina, focused on wild animals in their natural habitat: wild boar, deer, bears, wolves, and lynx. He described the biological meaning of bird vocalization and was concerned with the balance of nature.

An avid hunter, Botezat was also concerned with the biology and ecology of hunting in Bukovina. He studied the varieties of red deer living in the area's section of the Carpathian Mountains, analyzing the formation of their antlers and classifying them. He argued that the Austrian administration, particularly after 1870, mismanaged hunting, as it prioritized the shooting of the best specimens by nobles without concern for the state of the forests or the remaining deer. He recommended that, on the contrary, the weakest animals should be the ones targeted for hunting.

In June 1940, during the Soviet occupation of Northern Bukovina, he temporarily took over the university and handed over its administration to the Soviets, who treated him with respect. He took refuge in unoccupied Romania via Germany, settling in Bucharest. His valuable collection of hunting trophies and scientific displays was lost during World War II. In 1948, the new communist regime stripped him of Academy membership. He died in 1964.
