= Ion G. Sbiera =

Romanian folklorist

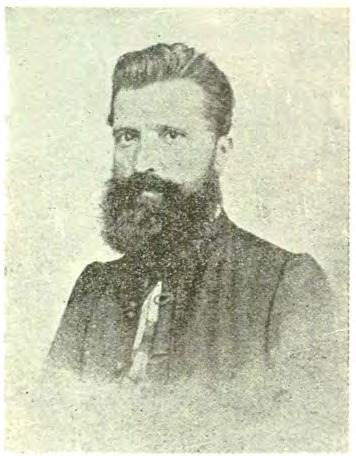
Portrait from Enciclopedia României

Ion Gheorghe Sbiera (born 1 November 1835, in Horodnic de Jos - died 22 October 1916, in Czernowitz) was an ethnic Romanian folklorist from Austria-Hungary. He was one of the founding members of the Romanian Academy. He is noted for his contributions towards promoting the use of the Romanian language in higher education and his work in preserving Romanian literary history.

== Biography ==
Ion Gheorghe Sbiera was born on November 1, 1836, in Horodnic de Jos, in Bukovina. He was the eighth child of Gheorghe and Ana Sbiera, who were wealthy peasants. He graduated from the Gymnasium in Rădăuți (1845-1848), where, according to later statements, he came to know the German language better than Romanian. Subsequently, he studied at the Gymnasium in Cernăuți, where Aron Pumnul – a person who had an important influence on him – was his Romanian language teacher.

Ion G. Sbiera passed his baccalaureate with the highest mark, and then, benefiting from a scholarship from the Orthodox Religious Fund of Bukovina, he was admitted to the University of Vienna, studying both Law and Philosophy concurrently. In July 1861, he finished his studies and returned to Bukovina, wishing to enter politics. At the suggestion of Alecu and Gheorghe Hurmuzachi, he became a Romanian language professor at the Cernăuți Gymnasium, replacing Aron Pumnul, who had retired due to severe illness. Realizing that the students lacked basic knowledge of Romanian national history, he tried to fill this gap. He documented himself from specialized works, learned and, in turn, taught his students basic notions of the history of Romanians and the history of the Romanian language, organized excursions and religious celebrations, which turned into true lessons of national education.

In 1862, Ion G. Sbiera played a decisive role, alongside other Romanian intellectuals, in founding the Romanian Reading Reunion in Cernăuți, which was transformed in 1865 into the Society for Romanian Culture and Literature in Bukovina. This society would play an extremely important role in promoting national culture until the Great Union, also influencing the political life of the Romanians in Bukovina. I. G. Sbiera would also lead the Society's first publication (Foaia Societății pentru Cultura și Literatura Română în Bucovina - The Sheet of the Society for Romanian Culture and Literature in Bukovina), in which his various reports and writings would appear, and Romanian authors would publish their literary creations. As years passed, I. G. Sbiera deepened his studies on the history of the Romanian people and language, and conducted folklore research, creating a body of work marked by durability. "My entire life," he would write, "I have spent with my eyes on a book and my quill in my hand. Books were my best friends, and reading them the most pleasant conversation." He collaborated in the elaboration of the Romanian Encyclopedia, edited by the ASTRA Society, coordinated by Corneliu Diaconovici, and the biographical and monographic notes from this work remain a valuable source of information to this day.

After the founding of the University of Cernăuți, Sbiera became the head of the Romanian Language Department within the university. In parallel, he continued to publish works about the Romanian language and the history of the Romanians. He retired from the University in 1906.

On December 14, 1898, by Royal Decree, he was awarded the Order of the Crown of Romania in the rank of Commander by King Carol I of Romania. Ion G. Sbiera died on October 22, 1916, in Cernăuți, and was buried in Cernăuți, next to Aron Pumnul. His son, Radu Sbiera, played an important role in the union of Bukovina with Romania and served as the mayor of Cernăuți and a deputy in the Romanian Parliament during the interwar period.
