= Radu Sbiera =

Austro-Hungarian-born Romanian linguist and politician

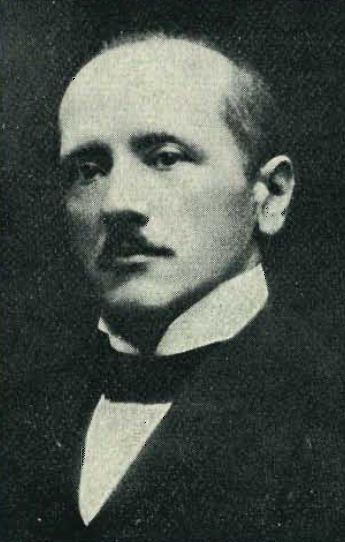
- Born: December 17, 1875; Czernowitz, Duchy of Bukovina, Austria-Hungary
- Died: April 6, 1946 (aged 70); Caracal, Kingdom of Romania
- Employer(s): Czernowitz/Cernăuți University; University of Bucharest

Academic background
- Education: Czernowitz University
- Alma mater: Czernowitz University

Mayor of Cernăuți
- In office 1926–1927

Member of the Chamber of Deputies

Personal details
- Profession: linguist, professor

Academic work
- Main interests: Linguistics

Radu I. Sbiera (December 17, 1876–April 6, 1946) was an Austro-Hungarian-born Romanian linguist and politician.

Born in Cernăuți, in the Duchy of Bukovina, he was the son of Ion G. Sbiera. After attending the state gymnasium and the normal school in his native city, he studied at the literature and philosophy faculty of Czernowitz University from 1894 to 1898. He received a degree in Latin, Greek, and Romanian, with a specialty in Classics and philosophy. He was a founding member of Societatea Academică Junimea. His 1903 PhD thesis dealt with Romance grammar. Until 1919, he taught Latin and Greek at the normal school and at a state high school in Cernăuți.

Sbiera joined the Romanian National Party in 1905. In October 1918, he joined the Romanian National Council as well as its executive committee. In November, he was secretary of the congress that voted for the union of Bukovina with Romania, and formed part of the delegation that presented the resolution to King Ferdinand I. From December 1918 until April 1919, he was education minister in the provincial government elected by the council. From 1919 to 1940, he taught at the department of Indo-European philology of Cernăuți University, and was dean in 1922–1923. From 1940, he taught in the Latin language and literature department of the University of Bucharest.

Sbiera served in the Assembly of Deputies and in 1926–1927 was mayor of Cernăuți. He wrote on Romanian and Classical philology, the history of education and culture in Bukovina. A poet and journalist, his contributions appeared in literary magazines and specialty publications: Apărarea națională, Convorbiri Literare, Codrul Cosminului, Deșteptarea, Gazeta Bucovinei, Familia, Junimea literară, Patria, and Revista filologică. From 1921 to 1924, he headed the Society for Romanian Culture and Literature in Bukovina. He died in Caracal.
