= Horodnic de Jos =

- Commune
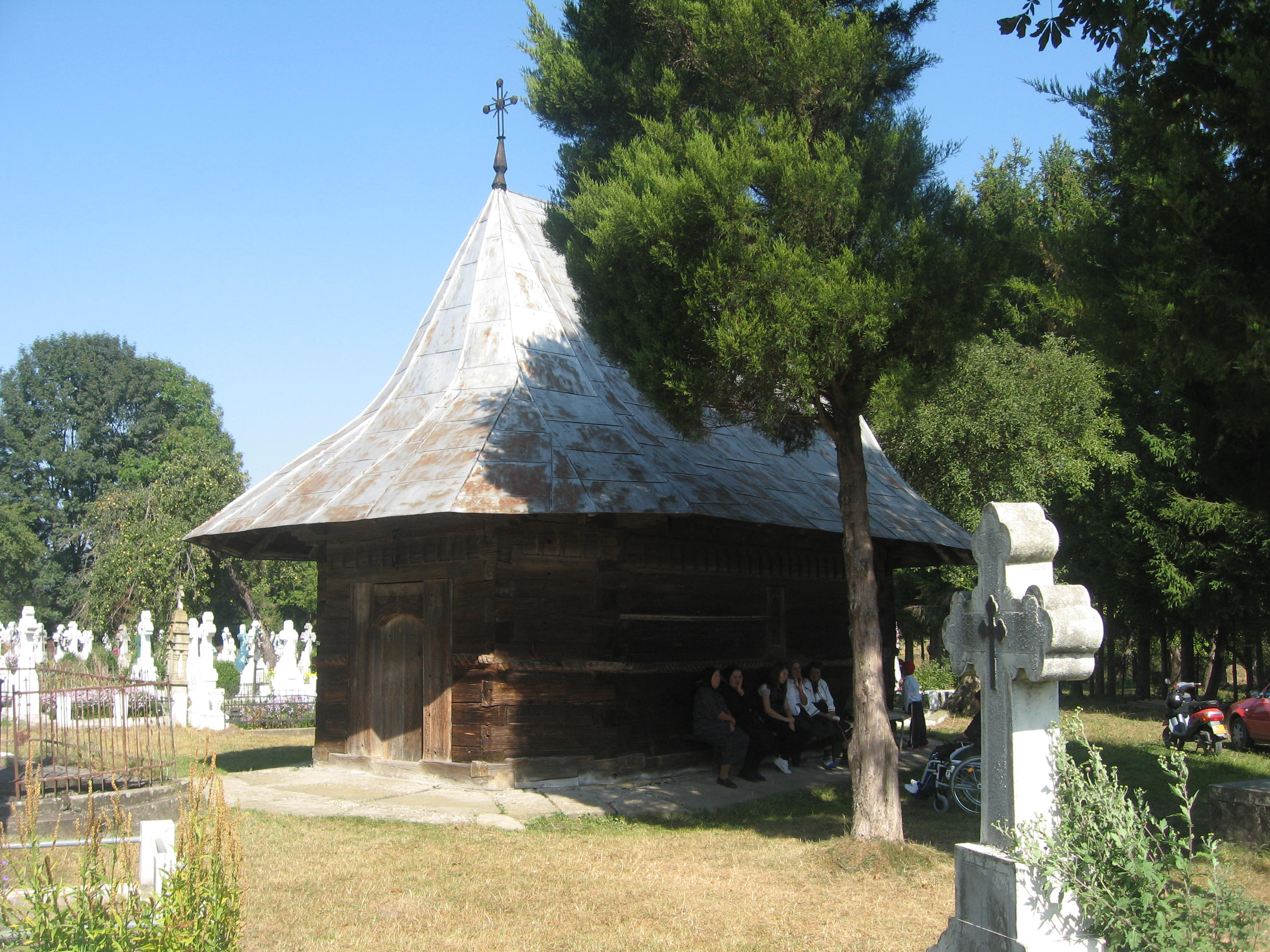
- Wooden church in Horodnic de Jos

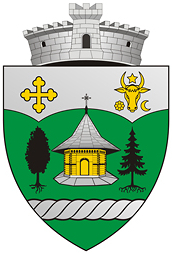
- Coat of arms

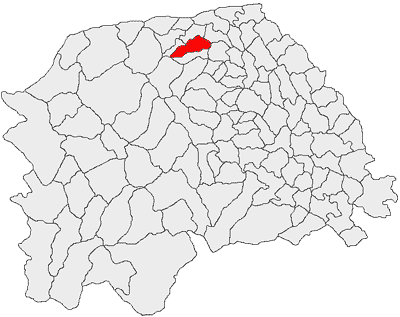
- Location in Suceava County

- Location in Romania
- Coordinates: 47°52′N 25°50′E
- Country: Romania
- County: Suceava

Government
  - Mayor (2020–2024): Ionel Andrișan (USR PLUS)
- Area: 26 km^{2} (10 sq mi)
- Elevation: 416 m (1,365 ft)
- Population (2021-12-01): 2,253
  - Density: 87/km^{2} (220/sq mi)
- Time zone: UTC+02:00 (EET)
  - Summer (DST): UTC+03:00 (EEST)
- Postal code: 727301
- Vehicle reg.: SV
- Website: horodnicdejos.ro

Horodnic de Jos (German: Unter Horodnik or Unterhorodnik) is a commune in Suceava County, Bukovina, northeastern Romania. It is composed of a single village, namely Horodnic de Jos. From 1950 to 2003, under the name of Horodnic commune, it included Horodnic de Sus (German: Ober Horodnik) village; that was then split off to form a separate commune, and Horodnic was renamed Horodnic de Jos.

== Natives ==
- Dimitrie Prelipcean (1927–1987), writer
- Ion G. Sbiera (1836–1916), writer
