= 2018 Olt County name referendum =

2018 name referendum held in Olt County in Romania

Olt County name referendum, 2018
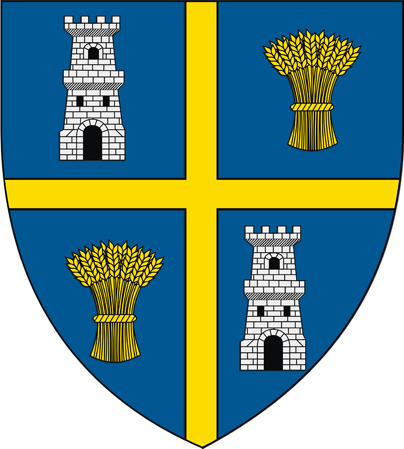
- 6–7 October 2018
- Do you agree with the assignment of the name Olt-Romanați to Olt County? Romanian: Sunteți de acord cu atribuirea denumirii Olt-Romanați județului Olt?
- Outcome: Referendum failed due to low turnout, below the required 30%

The 2018 Olt County name referendum was a referendum held in Olt County in Romania to rename the unit to "Olt-Romanați County" on 6 and 7 October 2018. This referendum was demanded by the inhabitants of the former Romanați County, especially those of its former capital Caracal, as they said it was to defend their identity and to remember the abolished county. The referendum did not attempt to enforce any administrative changes, only changes in the county's name. For it to pass, the voter turnout had to be of 30% or more out of the approximately 300,000 people eligible to vote in Olt County at the time and the results had to be of 50%+1 votes or more saying "yes".

The referendum was held at the same time as the 2018 Romanian constitutional referendum, which sought to prohibit same-sex marriage in Romania, so Olt County voters were given two ballots. The referendum cost about 900,000 Romanian lei, which was seen as an unnecessary expense by many locals.

Although the referendum was originally scheduled for 15 October 2017, it was held in the end on 6 and 7 October 2018. The question of the referendum was the following: "Do you agree with the assignment of the name Olt-Romanați to Olt County?" (Romanian: Sunteți de acord cu atribuirea denumirii Olt-Romanați județului Olt?). Around 369,000 people signed up for Olt County's voting lists. The turnout was 27.19%, so the referendum failed. The nationwide referendum regarding same-sex marriage also failed for the same reason. Unlike the nationwide referendum, no official data was released for the Olt County one.

== See also ==
- 2017 Nagorno-Karabakh constitutional referendum, a referendum which involved a name change
- 2018 Macedonian referendum, another referendum which involved a name change
