= Marius Bunescu =

Romanian painter

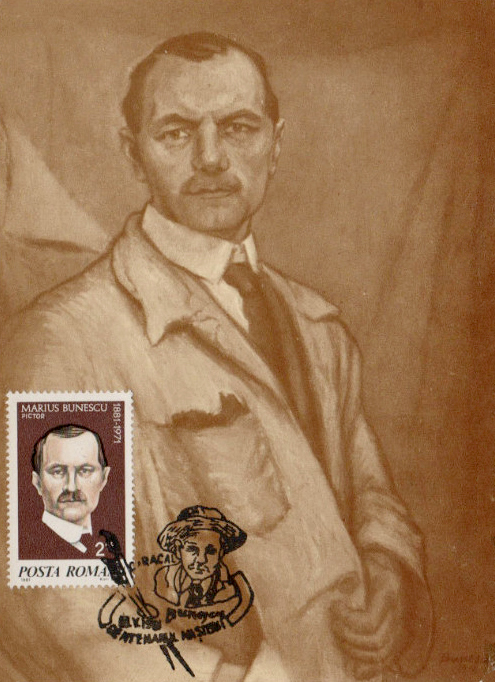
- Bunescu on a 1981 Romanian postcard
- Born: May 15, 1881; Caracal, Romanați County, Kingdom of Romania
- Died: March 31, 1971 (aged 89); Bucharest, Socialist Republic of Romania
- Resting place: Bellu Cemetery, Bucharest; 44°24′12.22″N 26°5′59.12″E
- Education: Academy of Fine Arts, Munich
- Known for: Painting
- Spouse: Magda Bunescu
- Relatives: Preda and Udrea (sons)
- Awards: Order of the Crown, Commander rank Order of Cultural Merit, 1st class

Marius Bunescu (15 May 1881 – 31 March 1971) was a Romanian painter, organizer of the National Museum of Art, and director of the Anastase Simu Museum.

Bunescu was born in Caracal, Romanați County, the son of Ioniță Bunea, a craftsman. His first artistic training was with Dimitrie Hârlescu in Constanța from 1904 to 1906, after which he went to study at the Academy of Fine Arts in Munich, where he worked with Hermann Groeber. He made his debut in 1911 at the Official Salon in Bucharest, and he had his first personal exhibit in 1919, at the Minerva Library. In 1924 he exhibited some of his paintings at the Romanian pavilion, during the Venice Biennale arts festival; he returned for exhibits at the Biennale in 1942 and 1954.

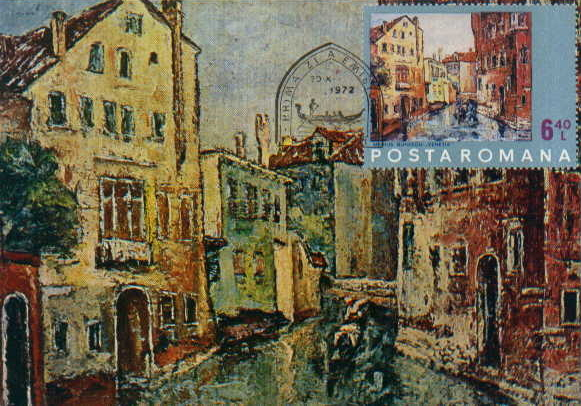
Venice by Bunescu

He began his long administrative career in 1920, becoming director of the Anastase Simu Museum, and later, after the death of the art collector in 1935, of the Simu Memorial House. In 1921, Bunescu participated in the establishment of the Fine Arts Union, being elected secretary, and from 1923 to 1927 he was president of the union. He received the National Prize for Painting in 1938, and in 1940 he was awarded the Order of Cultural Merit, Knight rank. In 1941 he was awarded the Order of the Crown, Commander rank. In 1944 he wrote a biographical study of Anastase Simu. Two years later, Bunescu was the chief force behind the initiative to open an art gallery at the high school in Caracal; the gallery now bears his name. In 1949 he took over the management of the Picture Gallery at the National Museum of Art. In 1967 he was awarded the Order of Cultural Merit, 1st class.

He was married to Magda (1895–1974), and had two sons, Preda (who defected to Germany, and worked at Radio Free Europe), and Udrea (a doctor who later left for Belgium).

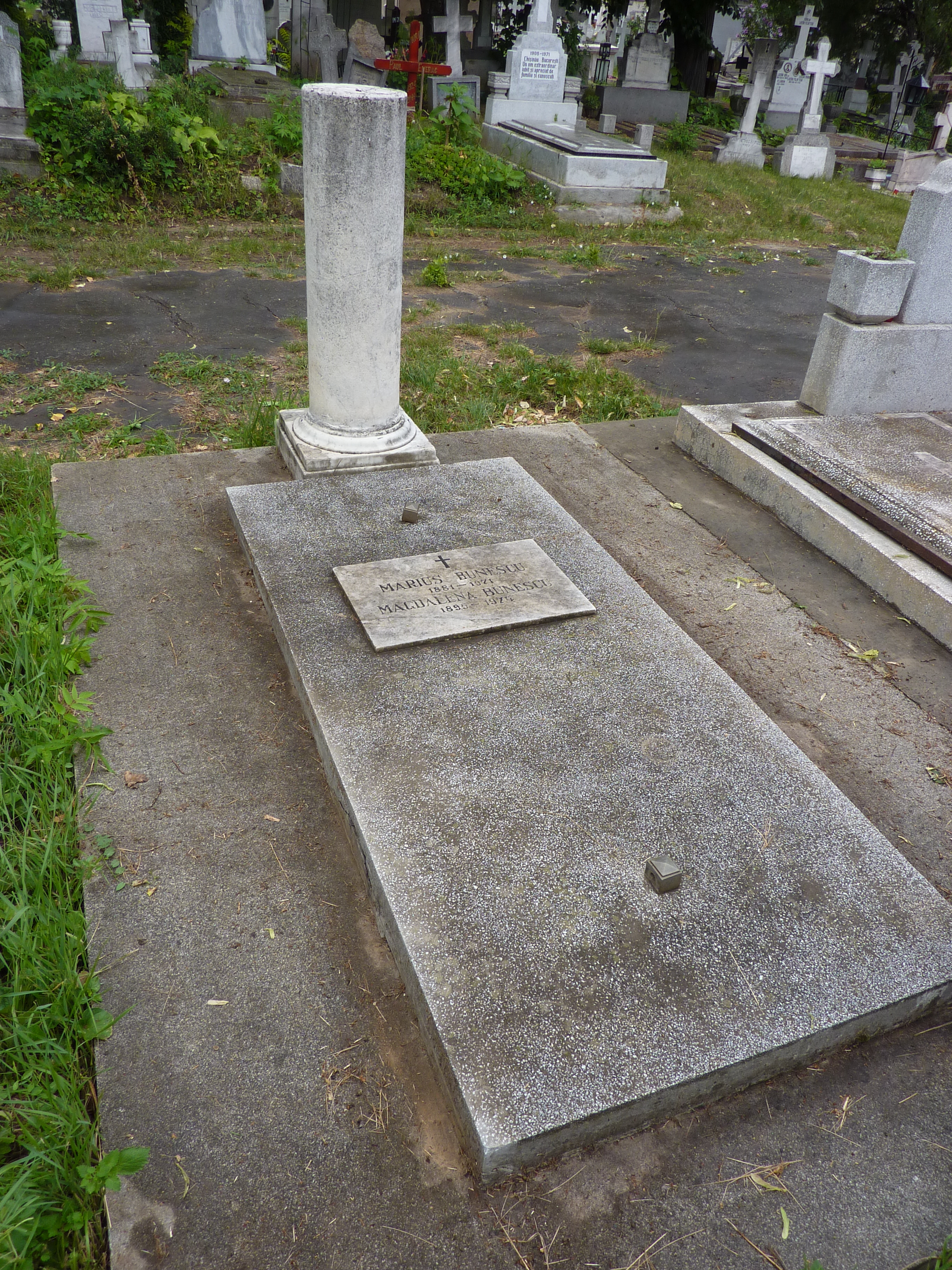
Grave of Bunescu and his wife at Bellu Cemetery

Bunescu died in Bucharest in 1971 and is buried in the Romanian Orthodox Bellu Cemetery.

He and his paintings appear on several stamps issued by Poșta Română: Venice paintings (1.55 and 6.40 lei, 1972), Construction Area painting (20 bani, 1973), Portrait (2.15 lei, 1981), Danube at the Cazan painting (2.80 lei, 2019).
