= Ioniță Asan National College =

Romanian College from Caracal

Coordinates: 44.1174°N 24.3540°E

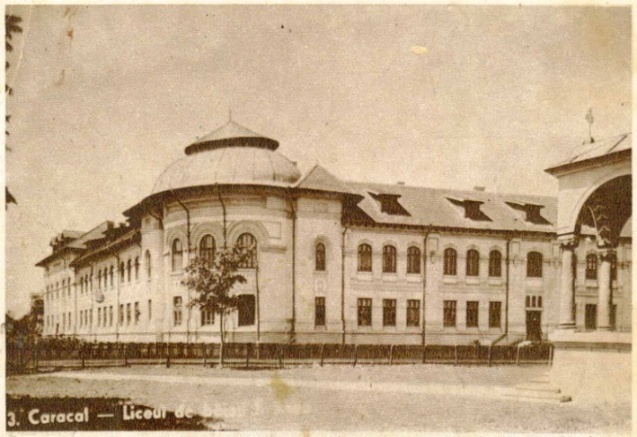
Old photo of the school

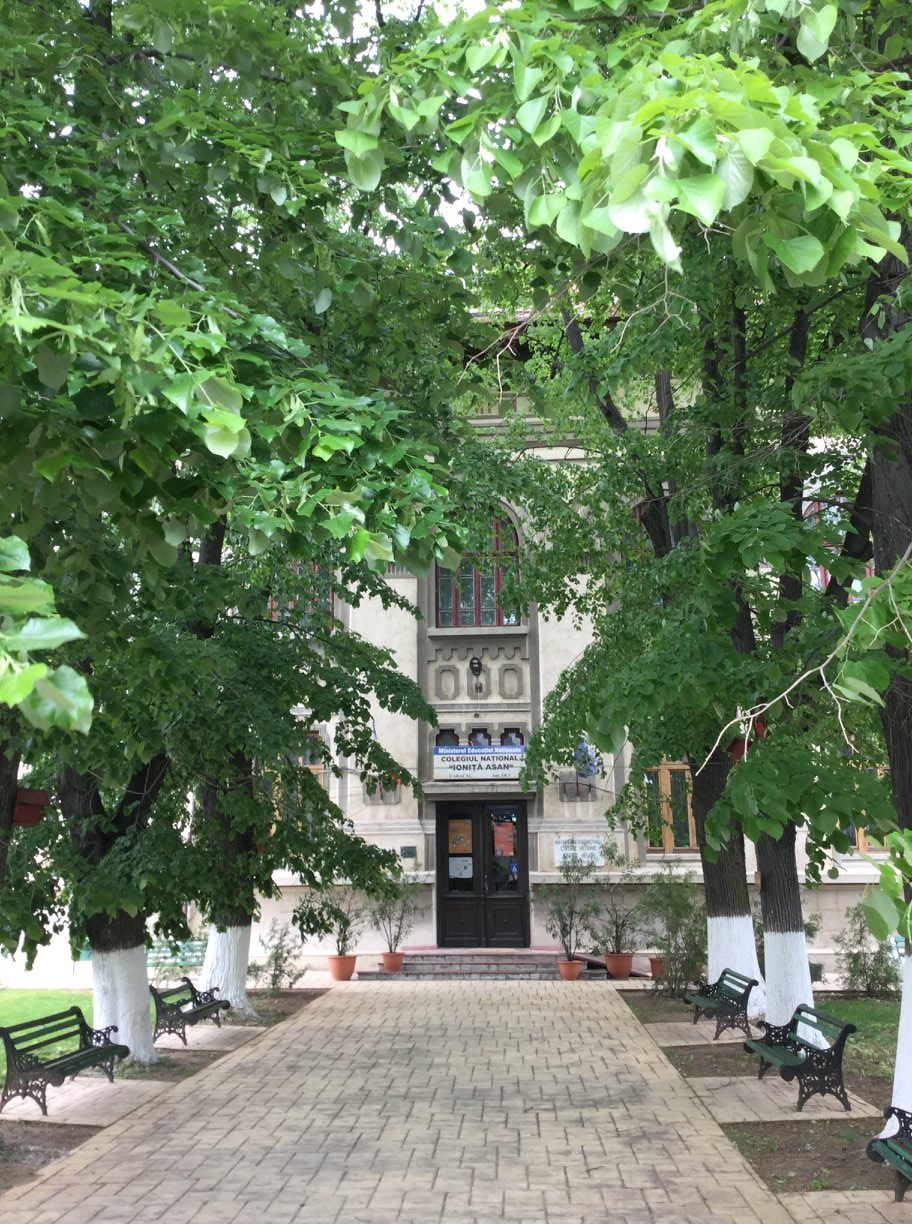
School entrance

Ioniță Asan National College (Romanian: Colegiul Național Ioniță Asan) is a high school located at 39 Nicolae Titulescu Boulevard, Caracal, Romania.

For some years, the citizens of Caracal had demanded a gymnasium in their town, and, with the approval of Education Minister Titu Maiorescu, one opened in the autumn of 1888. It was dedicated to Ivan Asen I of Bulgaria. A library was opened in 1889 and in 1902 named for Nică Barbu Locusteanu, who had made a substantial donation. In its early years, the school functioned in a private home. The first dedicated building was erected between 1891 and 1893, on expropriated and compensated land near the town park. Due to the marshy soil, it was built on a raised foundation; the cost came to 150,000 lei, supplied by the national government and by Romanați County.

In September 1919, following repeated requests from the principal, the gymnasium became a high school. A large, imposing new building, on land donated by city hall, was begun in 1922 and inaugurated in 1928. From 402 students in 1918–1919, there were 838 in 1927–1928. An amphitheater for shows and lectures opened in the 1930s; the same decade saw the appearance of several student publications, while a cultural society was established in 1944. The leadership of this organization decided to open an art gallery which would feature works by local artists. Having raised funds and enlisted the principal's support, they launched an appeal to the artists, who responded enthusiastically. The chief force behind the initiative became Marius Bunescu, for whom the gallery was named. He sought to acquire significant works for the exhibit room, which opened with 26 paintings and now holds over 300, making it the only art museum inside a Romanian high school.

With the onset of the communist regime, the Asan name was dropped in 1948, and 12th grade was eliminated until 1968. A gymnasium and dormitory opened in 1977, a cafeteria the following year and a new wing in 1980. Various name changes took place, with the institution being made an industrial high school in 1983. In 1990, following the Romanian Revolution, the school was again dedicated to Asan.

It is now under new construction.
