= Virgil Carianopol =

Romanian poet (1908–1984)

Virgil Carianopol (March 29, 1908–April 6, 1984) was a Romanian poet.

Born in Caracal, his parents were Grigore Carianopol, a court clerk, and his wife Atena (née Popescu). He attended primary school (1916–1920) and the first two grades of secondary school (1920–1922) at the city's Ioniță Asan High School. After fleeing home twice, the first time at age fourteen, his father sent him to a Bucharest military school for munitions specialists. He attended this institution from 1924 to 1930, becoming a specialist in the manufacture of gunpowder and explosives. However, he abandoned the army and audited courses at the University of Bucharest's literature and philosophy faculty from 1934 to 1938. Meanwhile, he worked as a civilian employee in various sectors of the army, including the arsenal and censorship.

He made his literary debut in 1928, in Vraja magazine. Pen names he used include V. Olteanu, V. Jianu, V. Călugăru, V. Cariopol, and Vicar. His first book, Flori de spin (1931), along with two that appeared soon after, Virgil Carianopol (1933) and Un ocean, o frunte în exil (1934), form part of his first, avant-garde phase. His next period included Scrisori către plante (1936), which won a prize from the Romanian Writers' Society; Carte pentru domnițe (1937); Frunzișul toamnei mele (1938) and Scară la cer (1940). These volumes marked a transition toward a traditional Gândirism. His later works included Cântece de amurg (1969), Viorile vârstei (1972), Lirice (1973), Elegii și elegii (1974), Lumini pentru dragostea mea (1978) and Cântec la plecarea verii (1981). They are marked by a clearer lyricism, the stylization of older motifs and the crystallization of elegiac inflections, reflections of his own voice, into a melancholic melody of life's ephemeral quality. His memoirs were published as Scriitori care au devenit amintiri, appearing in two volumes (1973 and 1982).
