= 2017 Nagorno-Karabakh constitutional referendum =

- 20 February 2017

Results
| Choice | Votes | % |
|---|---|---|
| Yes | 69,570 | 90.05% |
| No | 7,686 | 9.95% |
| Valid votes | 77,256 | 97.27% |
| Invalid or blank votes | 2,172 | 2.73% |
| Total votes | 79,428 | 100.00% |
| Registered voters/turnout | 103,818 | 76.51% |
- Results by province For: 70-80% 80–90% >90%

A constitutional referendum was held in the unrecognised Nagorno-Karabakh Republic on 20 February 2017. At least 25% of registered voters needed to vote in favour in order to validate the result. The referendum passed with about three quarters of voters voting.

== Background ==
President Bako Sahakyan created a commission to draft a new constitution to replace the 2006 constitution. The draft was delivered on 24 November 2016 and approved by the National Assembly on 17 January by a vote of 20–7. On 19 January, Sahakyan set the referendum date.

== Constitutional changes ==
The constitutional changes would result in the name "Republic of Artsakh" being officially adopted for the unrecognised country and used alongside its current name, as well as in abolishing the office of the Prime Minister and giving more power to the President to make quicker decisions on security.

Levon Galustyan, an MP from the unrecognised country of Abkhazia and an observer at the referendum, said the idea for a name change was brought forward after Nagorno-Karabakh politicians had expressed worry that the use of the name "Artsakh" and "Nagorno-Karabakh" by Azerbaijan for its athletic teams and artistic initiatives abroad might create the wrong impression of the region's reality.

== Results ==
| Choice | Votes | % |
|---|---|---|
| For | 69,570 | 90.05 |
| Against | 7,686 | 9.95 |
| Total | 77,256 | 100.00 |
| Valid votes | 77,256 | 97.27 |
| Invalid/blank votes | 2,172 | 2.73 |
| Total votes | 79,428 | 100.00 |
| Registered voters/turnout | 103,818 | 76.51 |
Source: CEC

== Observers ==
Observation missions to the referendum included over 104 international organizations from more than 30 countries, 103 local observers and over 80 media representatives. Foreign countries and states who sent observer representatives included, Bolivia, Russia, Germany, Austria, Uruguay, Mexico, Brazil, Argentina, the Basque Country, the United States and Canada.

Artsakh representatives stated that, "The observers highly valued the Referendum as another evidence of consolidation of statehood, expression of free will of Artsakh and a process of democratization."

== Reactions ==
The government of Azerbaijan, which Nagorno-Karabakh de jure was part of but which had lost de facto control of the region following the First Nagorno-Karabakh War, condemned the referendum calling it a "provocation" and counter-productive for the conflict resolution process. The government also issued an international arrest warrant for three Members of the European Parliament who acted as observers at the referendum.

The OSCE Minsk Group, the official mediator of the Nagorno-Karabakh conflict, stated that the results of the referendum would not change the legal status of Nagorno-Karabakh. The governments of Georgia, Ukraine, and Turkey stated that they did not recognise the referendum.

== See also ==
- 2018 Macedonian referendum – a referendum which involved a name change
- 2018 Olt County name referendum – another referendum which involved a name change
