= Anastase Simu =

Romanian art collector (1854–1935)

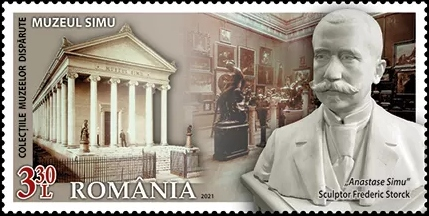
2021 Romanian postage stamp featuring a bust of Simu by Frederic Storck, with images of his museum's interior and exterior

Anastase Simu (25 March 1854 – 28 February 1935) was a Romanian art collector.

Born in Brăila, he had two brothers and three sisters. While the genealogical record is incomplete, it appears that his father Panait was a native of Epirus, part of the city's powerful Greek community, and ran a candle factory with his brother. After attending the Brăila Commercial School, Simu obtained a baccalaureate from the Theresianum in Vienna. He then took two university degrees: in law from the University of Paris, and in political science and administration from the Free University of Brussels. For a time, he was secretary at the Romanian legation in Berlin.

In 1882, he married Elena Dumba, the daughter of a landowner of Aromanian origin; the two settled in Bucharest in 1888. The source of Simu's wealth, which he used to build up his art collection, was the income from two estates: Fleașca in Brăila County (now called Vultureni) and Tufeni in Teleorman County (now in Olt County). Simu, aged 19 and a student in Vienna, inherited the first from a childless uncle. The second was given by his father-in-law as a dowry.

Simu retained ties to Brăila, donating 30 paintings to its city hall in 1928; these formed the nucleus of an art museum opened in 1950. He was elected to represent the city in the Chamber of Deputies, winning four terms: 1888, 1891, 1892 and 1899. A member of the Conservative Party, he showed particular interest in the situation of Macedonia’s Aromanians, deploring the Liberal government’s closure of regional schools and of the consulate in Bitola.

Eventually, Simu grew tired of politics and turned his attention toward art collecting. He acquired painting, sculptures and other objets d’art, both from Romania and Western Europe, in particular France. These were exposed to the public in the Anastase Simu Museum in Bucharest from its opening in 1910 until its closure in 1960 and subsequent demolition by the Communist regime. One critique raised against the collector had to do with his classicizing, pedagogical tastes, which did not leave room for the avant-garde. He was good friends with sculptor Antoine Bourdelle, whose penchant for classical forms may have inspired the museum’s Greek temple shape. A bust of Simu by the sculptor is displayed at the entrance of the Musée Bourdelle. During numerous journeys west, Simu was accompanied by his wife; together, the couple acquired artworks and cultivated relationships with their creators. Simu donated the Bucharest collection to the Romanian state in 1927.

Belying his image of a connoisseur with academic and passé inclinations, Simu was among the first to purchase works by the young Constantin Brâncuși: the marble sculpture Somnul in 1909, and the bust of painter Nicolae Dărăscu the following year. He was elected an honorary member of the Romanian Academy in 1933. His wife died the following year, and Simu himself in 1935; the couple are buried at Bellu Cemetery. An early biographical study was published by the museum’s director, Marius Bunescu, in 1944.
