= 2018 Macedonian referendum =

- 30 September 2018
- Are you in favour of European Union and NATO membership by accepting the agreement between the Republic of Macedonia and the Hellenic Republic?
- Outcome: Proposal not validated as voter turnout was below 50%

Results
Choice	Votes	%
Yes	609,427	94.18%
No	37,687	5.82%
Valid votes	647,114	97.11%
Invalid or blank votes	19,230	2.89%
Total votes	666,344	100.00%
Registered voters/turnout	1,806,336	36.89%
- Results by municipality

A referendum was held in the Republic of Macedonia on 30 September 2018, with voters asked whether they supported EU and NATO membership by accepting the Prespa Agreement between Macedonia and Greece, signed in June 2018, which aimed to settle the 27-year naming dispute, which had prevented Macedonia from joining both the European Union and NATO. The government, a coalition between the Social Democratic Union and the Democratic Union for Integration led by Prime Minister Zoran Zaev, strongly supported the agreement and encouraged a 'Yes' vote in the referendum. The opposition, led by the conservative and eurosceptic VMRO-DPMNE, rejected the agreement and encouraged voters to vote 'No'.

Despite 94% of voters voting in favour, voter turnout was around 37%, less than the 50% threshold required to validate the results. Both the opposition and government claimed victory, with the opposition claiming that the proposal had been rejected by virtue of the low turnout and the government argued that the result being non-binding meant the turnout requirement was irrelevant. As the referendum was non-binding and included constitutional changes, it also had to be ratified by two-thirds of the Assembly of the Republic. Zaev vowed to push forward with the changes in the Assembly, which was achieved on 19 October 2018, when 80 of the 120 MPs voted in favour of the renaming proposal, narrowly reaching the two-thirds majority required.

== Background ==
After the independence of the Republic of Macedonia from SFR Yugoslavia in 1991, successive Greek governments claimed that the name of the country implied territorial claims to the Greek part of the region of Macedonia and objected to the use of "Macedonia" by the newly independent state. The state was admitted to the United Nations in 1993 with the provisional reference "the former Yugoslav Republic of Macedonia", while most countries recognised the Republic of Macedonia under its constitutional name.

Repeated attempts to negotiate a composite name failed for almost three decades. However, in 2018, high-level contacts between the governments of the two countries intensified, with Macedonian Deputy Prime Minister Bujar Osmani visiting Athens for name talks on 9 January, and Macedonian Prime Minister Zoran Zaev meeting with his Greek counterpart Alexis Tsipras on the sidelines of the World Economic Forum at Davos, Switzerland on 24 January. At the Davos meeting, the first of its kind in seven years, there appeared to be some resolution between the two leaders to end the name dispute and improve the relations between the two countries. Zaev agreed to take initiatives that would soothe Greek concerns over the antiquisation policy, while Tsipras agreed to consent to Macedonia's bid to join regional initiatives or agreements.

On 12 June 2018, Tsipras announced that he had reached an agreement with Zaev "which covers all the preconditions set by the Greek side." The negotiations would result in the Republic of Macedonia being renamed the Republic of North Macedonia, with the new name being used for all purposes. Zaev announced that the agreement included recognition of the Macedonian language in the United Nations and that the term used for nationality of the country would be Macedonian/citizen of the Republic of North Macedonia. "The agreement once and for always confirms and strengthens the Macedonian ethnic and cultural identity, the Macedonian language, the Macedonian nationality. It guarantees the security of the country and provides a secure future for the citizens of the Republic of Macedonia", Zaev said. Additionally, the agreement stipulates removal of the Vergina Sun from public use in the Republic of Macedonia and formation of a committee for the review of school textbooks and maps in both countries for the removal of irredentist content and to align them with UNESCO and Council of Europe's standards. The agreement was signed at Lake Prespa, a body of water shared between Albania, Greece and North Macedonia from which it got its name.

The agreement stipulated that the Macedonian government could hold a referendum on the matter. The Assembly of the Republic paved the way for the referendum by ratifying the agreement for a second time in early July. After a month long delay by the opposition party VMRO-DPMNE to slow down the referendum preparation by not appointing members to the State Election Commission, the Assembly finally agreed as of the end of July on a new composition. The Assembly set aside 1.3 million euros for the referendum campaign and as the VMRO-DPMNE opposition refused to participate and access funds, only 900,000 euros was spent on 66 media outlets by politicians supporting a yes vote.

Political scientist Biljana Vankovska claimed that the referendum was unconstitutional, noting that Article 73 of the constitution required referendums to be binding.

== Question ==
The text of the question put to voters was:

Are you in favour of European Union and NATO membership by accepting the agreement between the Republic of Macedonia and the Republic of Greece?

== Campaign ==
=== Support ===
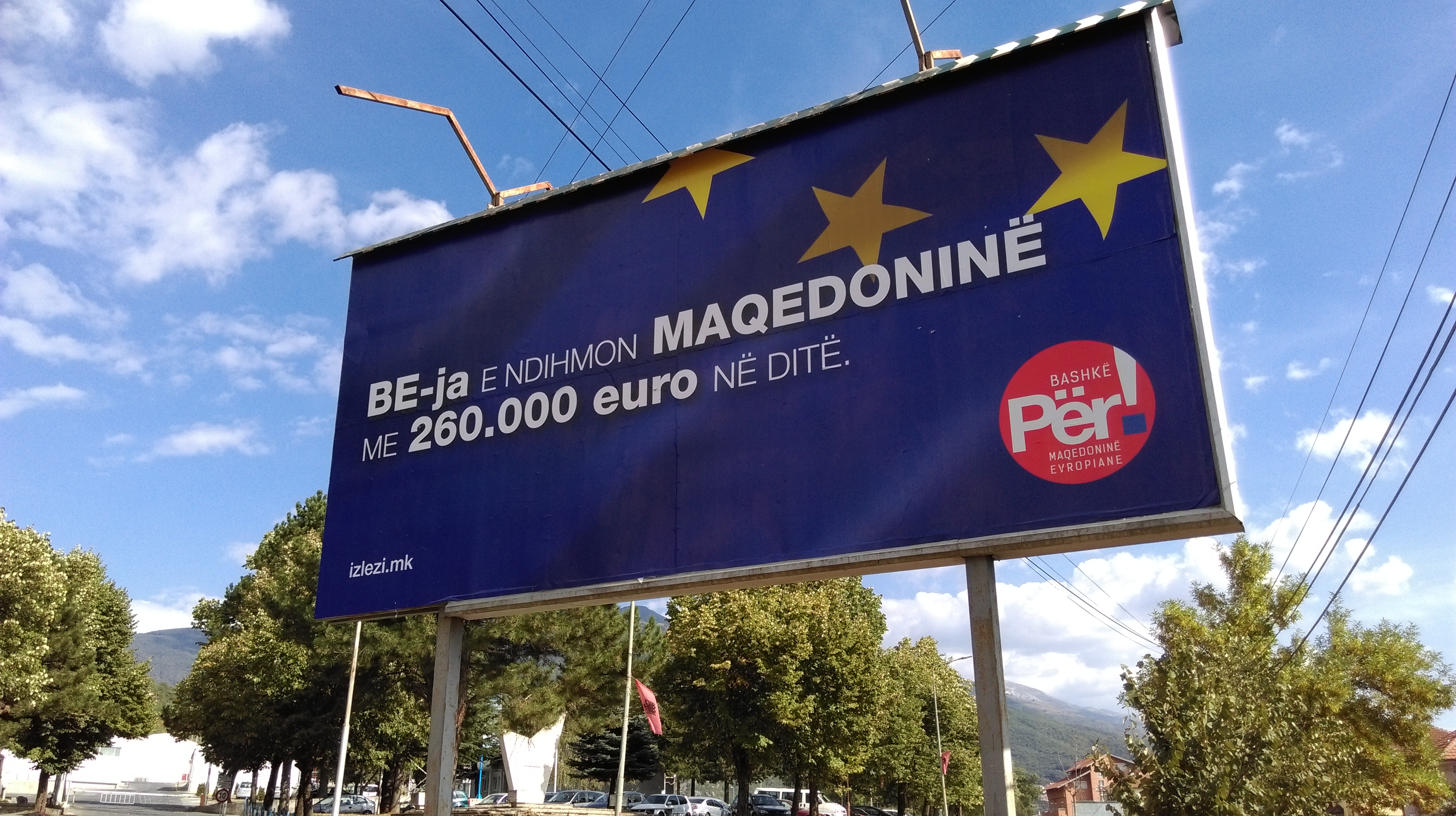
Pro-EU referendum billboard in Debar, in Albanian. Translated it reads: The EU helps Macedonia with 260,000 euros a day. Together for a European Macedonia.

Macedonian Prime Minister Zoran Zaev and the government coalition started an online campaign for a “Yes” vote in the referendum. Many high-ranked officials and EU leaders expressed their support for the "Yes" option as it would bring Macedonia closer to EU and NATO. Among those who visited the country in support of the referendum are Angela Merkel and Sebastian Kurz, Chancellors of Germany and Austria respectively, as well as Jim Mattis, the US Defense Secretary, and Jens Stoltenberg, the Secretary General of NATO, who encouraged the people of Macedonia to vote in favor of the new name. The Albanian President Ilir Meta, Prime Minister Edi Rama and Foreign Minister Ditmir Bushati also urged Albanians in Macedonia to support the deal and vote “Yes” in the referendum. In Macedonia, Albanian political parties and their leaders Ali Ahmeti (DUI), Menduh Thaçi (DPA), Bilall Kasami (Besa Movement) and Ziadin Sela (Alliance for Albanians) supported the “Yes” vote.

=== Objections and boycotts ===
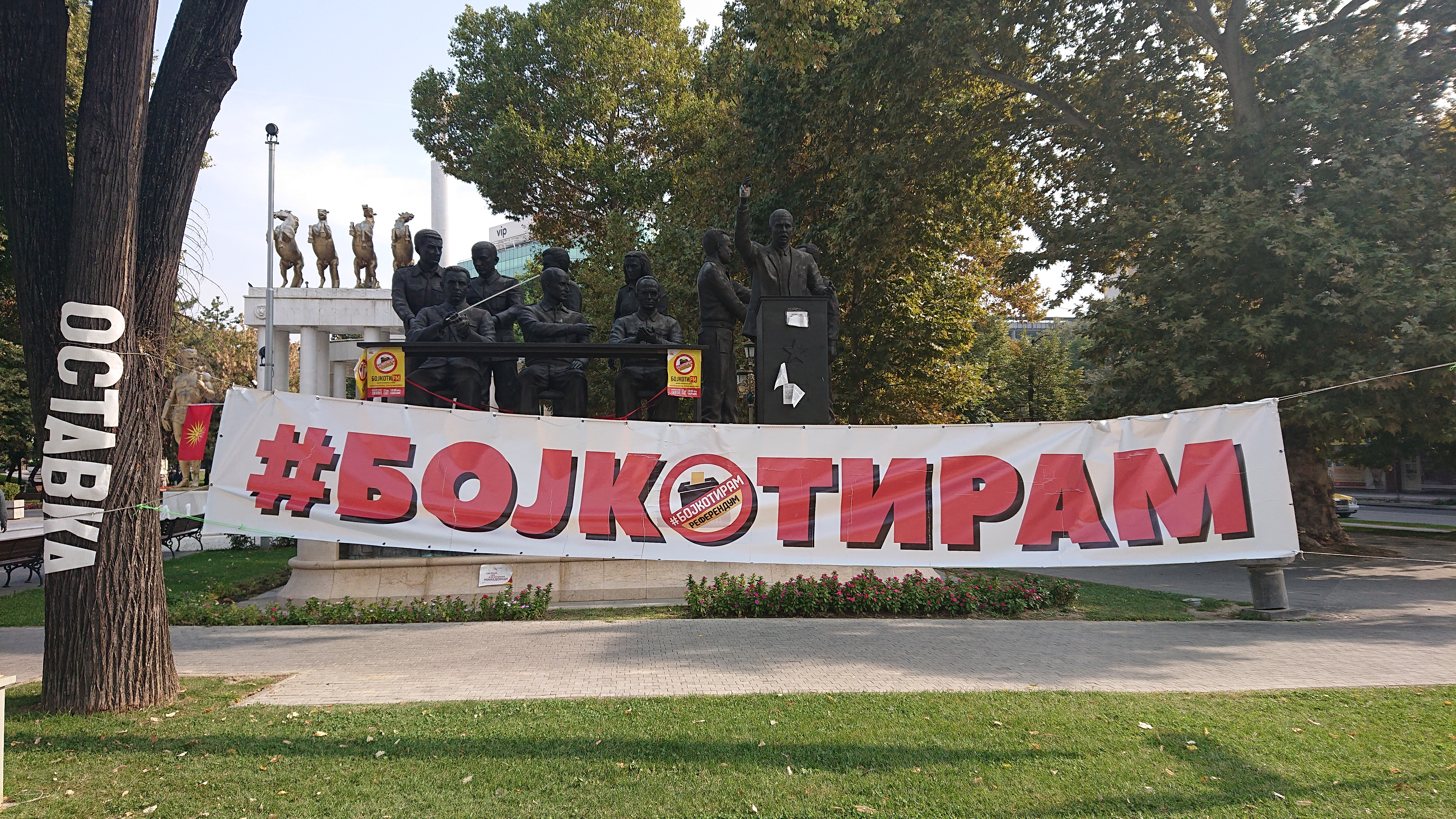
Banners and posters of the boycott movement Bojkotiram opposite to the Assembly of the Republic of Macedonia in Skopje, three days after the referendum

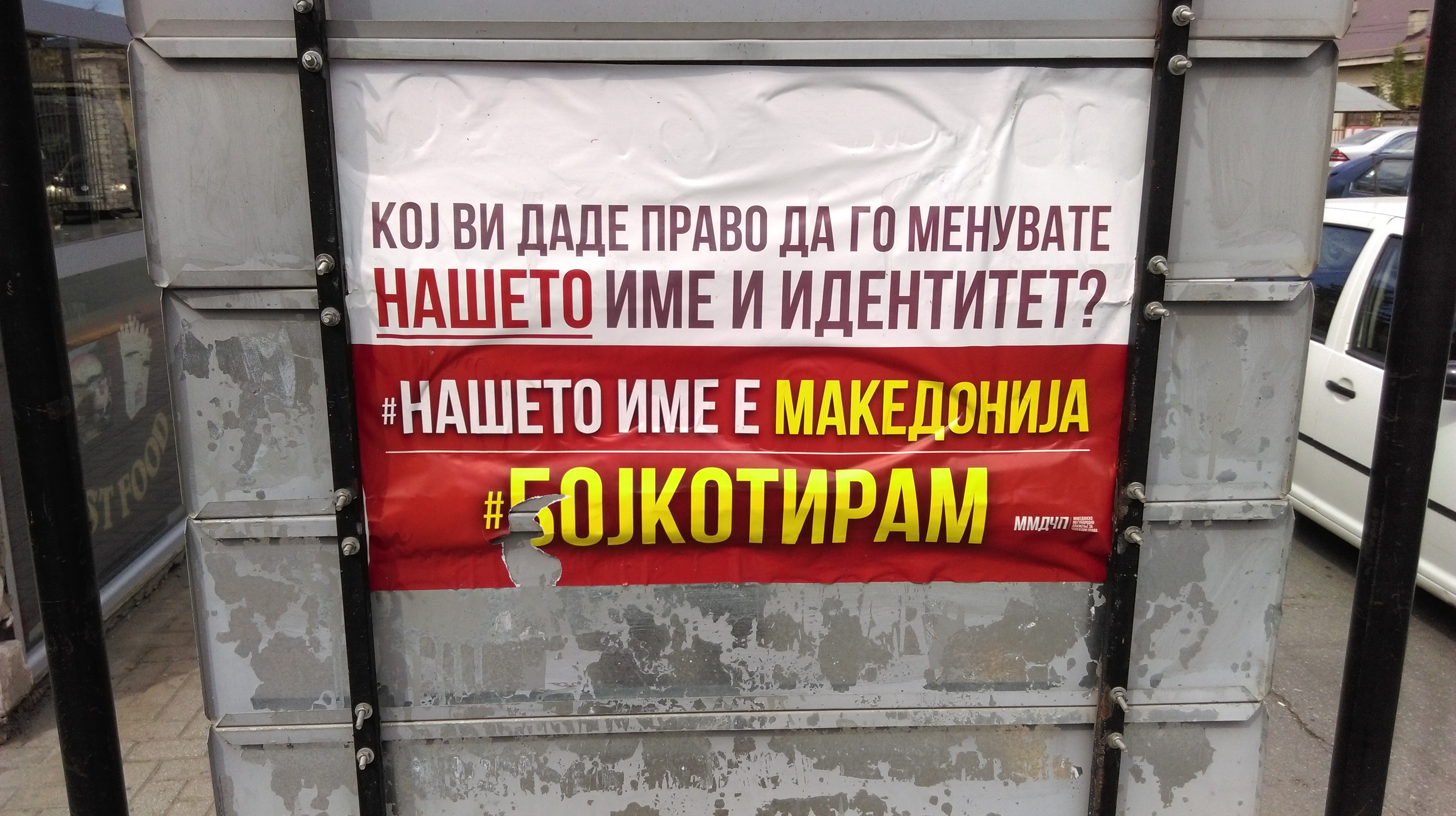
Macedonian referendum boycott poster in Struga. Translated it reads: Who gave you the right to change our name and identity? Our name is Macedonia #I will boycott

The main opposition party VMRO-DPMNE threatened to boycott the referendum and claimed the Prespa agreement to be an act of treason. However, in early September, VMRO-DPMNE president Hristijan Mickoski made a statement encouraging citizens to vote as they saw fit, and that the party would respect different opinions. The party did not participate in the referendum campaign, while several high ranking party members voiced their support for a boycott or the "Yes" side. It was reported in early September that a leaked diplomatic cable from the US embassy in the Republic of Macedonia showed that the 2008 VMRO-DPMNE government was willing to accept the name Republic of North Macedonia, for international and bilateral use only, provided it included the recognition of the Macedonian language and nationality. The proposal had been rejected by Greece. This was denied by media close to the party, which stated that VMRO-DPMNE was only willing to accept changing the FYROM reference to North Macedonia, while keeping the constitutional name the same. On 23 September, President Gjorge Ivanov, who was elected as the VMRO-DPMNE candidate, decried the agreement and called on citizens to boycott the vote. Various other small anti-Western organizations with pro-Serbian and pro-Russian orientations organized protests against the name change.

Among the Macedonian diaspora, a majority of Macedonians living in Australia stated that they would boycott the vote.

=== Russian interference ===
Various diplomats and analysts, including U.S. Defense Secretary Jim Mattis, have accused Russia of engaging in a campaign to undermine the referendum. Russia is opposed to any additional countries joining NATO or the European Union. Thousands of fake Twitter and Facebook accounts urged Macedonians to boycott the vote. Some Facebook postings asked "are you going to let Albanians change your name?", attempting to exploit ethnic divisions in the country. The "No" lobby banked on a boycott that could render the referendum result meaningless. Two Russian diplomats were expelled from Greece due to accusations of attempting to undermine relations with Macedonia, and a year earlier Russian citizens were arrested related to a failed coup in Montenegro attempting to prevent that country from joining NATO.

== Opinion polls ==
Date(s) conducted	Yes	No	Undecided	Will not vote	Error margin	Sample	Conducted by	Method
28 June – 15 July 2018	49%	22%	13%	16%	± 3.0%	1100 respondents aged 18 and over	IRI	Face-to-face interviews
24 July – 1 August 2018	41.5%	35.1%	9.2%	12.4%	± 3.1%	1026 likely voters	MCIC	Computer-assisted telephone interview

== Results ==
Turnout in the quota referendum by municipalities

While the vote in favour of the referendum question reached 94.18%, total turnout reached only 36.89% with 666,344 votes cast, well below the 50% par for the referendum to be valid. Despite the traditional pro-EU and NATO stance of the Albanian minority, and its support of Premier Zaev's government, turnout in the 15 predominantly ethnic Albanian municipalities was only marginally lower than in the previous local election with 233,000 votes cast.

Choice	Votes	%
For	609,427	94.18
Against	37,687	5.82
Total	647,114	100.00
Valid votes	647,114	97.11
Invalid/blank votes	19,230	2.89
Total votes	666,344	100.00
Registered voters/turnout	1,806,336	36.89
Source: SEC

== Reactions ==
Western leaders welcomed the result as positive, despite the low turnout. The European Union's Commissioner for Neighbourhood and Enlargement Negotiations, Johannes Hahn, called the "Yes" vote "very significant" and urged Macedonia's political leaders to "respect this decision and take it forward with utmost responsibility". NATO chief, Jens Stoltenberg, in his post on Twitter described the referendum as a "historic opportunity", while reaffirming that "NATO’s door is open" for Macedonia. The United States also welcomed the outcome, with the State Department urging Macedonian lawmakers "to rise above partisan politics and seize this historic opportunity" in implementing the Prespa agreement, which could enable Macedonia to become "a full participant in Western institutions". Greece's Foreign Ministry welcomed the positive result, but described it as "contradictory" to the low vote turnout, and the Greek Prime Minister Alexis Tsipras phoned his Macedonian counterpart Zoran Zaev right after the referendum to congratulate him for the positive outcome.

Russia, a staunch opponent of Macedonia's Euro-Atlantic integration, on the other hand, hinted that it could veto the Prespa agreement between the Republic of Macedonia and Greece, by bringing it to the United Nations Security Council. Macedonia dismissed Moscow's threats by stating that bilateral agreements cannot be dependent on the Security Council.

== Aftermath ==
On 19 October 2018, the Assembly voted to start the process of renaming the country Republic of North Macedonia. A total of 80 deputies in the 120-seat Assembly voted in favour of the renaming proposal, just reaching the two-thirds majority needed to enact constitutional changes. On 3 December 2018, the Assembly approved a draft constitutional amendment, with 67 voting in favour, 23 voting against and 4 abstaining. A simple majority was needed at this stage.

The decisive vote to amend the constitution and change the name of the country was passed on 11 January 2019 in favor of the amendment. On 25 January 2019, the Greek Parliament approved the Prespa agreement with 153 votes in favor and 146 votes against. The international community, including the Prime Ministers Justin Trudeau of Canada and Boyko Borisov of Bulgaria, President Hashim Thaçi of Kosovo, the President of the European Council, Donald Tusk, the President of EU's Commission Jean-Claude Juncker, Germany's and Albania's foreign Ministers, Heiko Maas and Ditmir Bushati respectively, as well as NATO's chief Jens Stoltenberg, welcomed positively the ratification of the deal.

Since the referendum, the country joined NATO in 2020 but has not yet joined the European Union. The process of joining the EU has been delayed by vetoes from France and Bulgaria, as well as the victory of VMRO-DPMNE in the 2024 parliamentary elections. In April 2026 Deputy Prime Minister Bojan Marichikj stated that the country was aiming to join the EU in the early 2030s.

== See also ==
- 2017 Nagorno-Karabakh constitutional referendum, a referendum which involved a name change
- 2018 Olt County name referendum, another referendum which involved a name change
