= Romanați County =

Județul Romanați
- County (Județ)
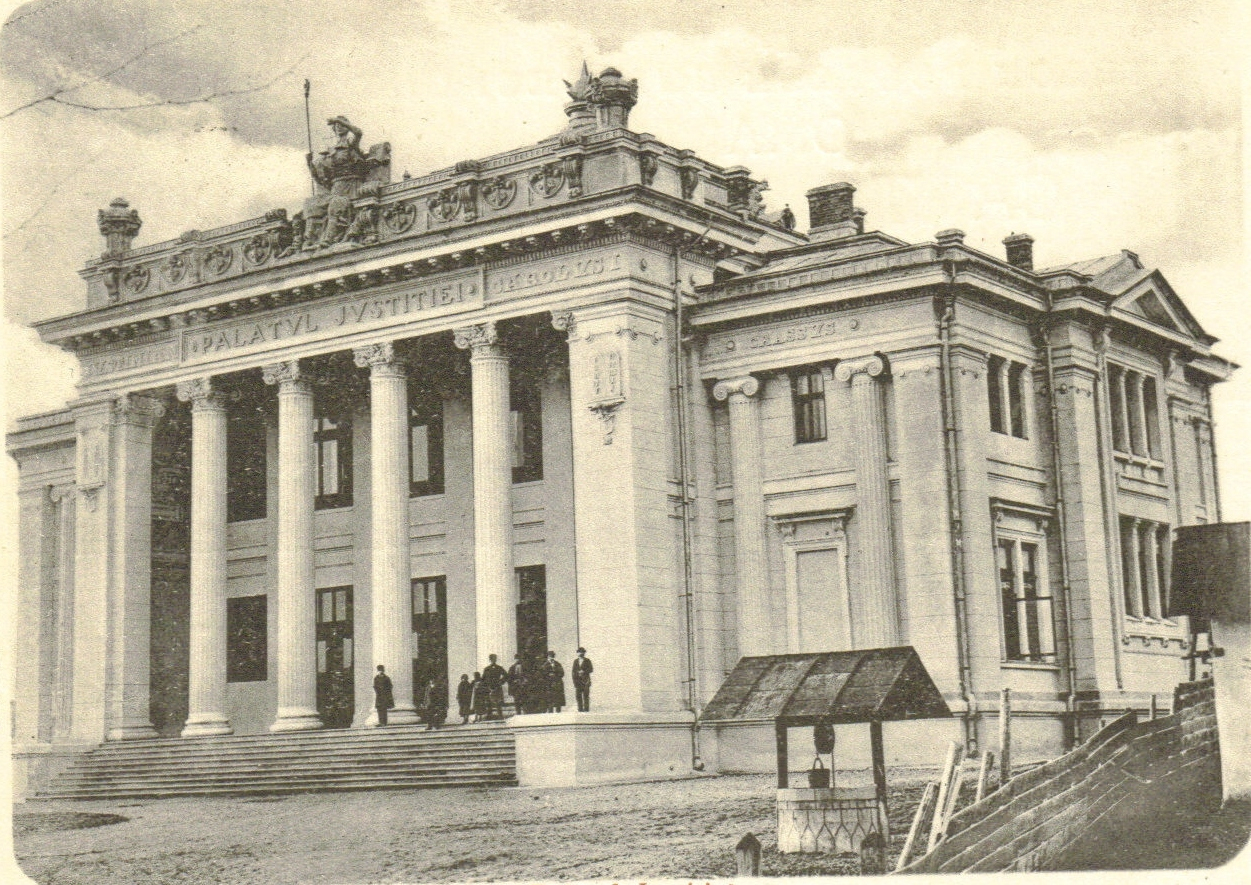
- Romanați County court house of the interwar period.

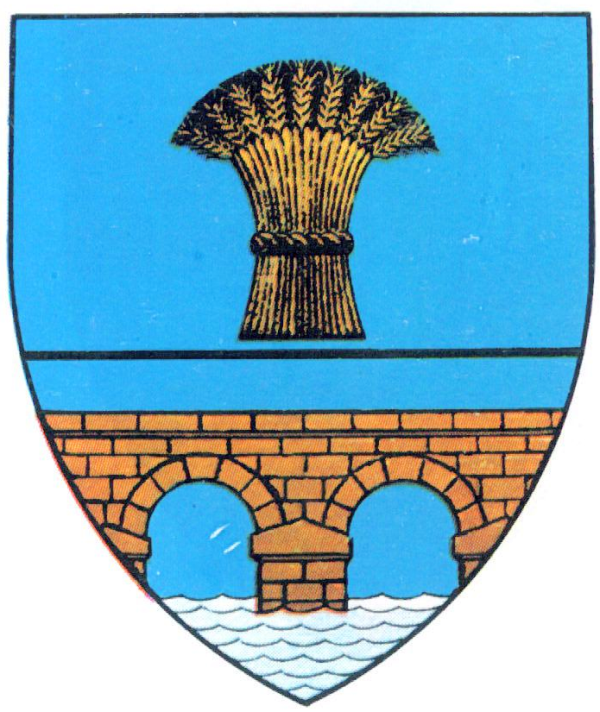
- Coat of arms

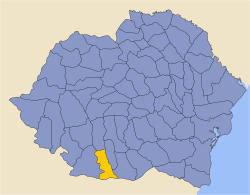
- Country: Romania
- Historic region: Oltenia
- County seat (Reședință de județ): Caracal
- Established: Sometime before 1601
- Ceased to exist: Administrative reform of 1950

Area
  - Total: 3,560 km^{2} (1,370 sq mi)

Population (1930)
  - Total: 271,096
  - Density: 76.2/km^{2} (197/sq mi)
- Time zone: UTC+2 (EET)
  - Summer (DST): UTC+3 (EEST)

Romanați County was a county (Romanian: județ) in the Kingdom of Romania, in southeastern part of the historical region of Oltenia. The county seat was Caracal.

The county was located in the southwestern part of Romania, in the southeastern part of Oltenia. The county was bordered on the west by Dolj County, to the north by Vâlcea County, to the east by the counties of Olt and Teleorman, and to the south by the Kingdom of Bulgaria. Its territory now comprises the south-eastern part of the current Dolj County, the central-southern part of the current Olt County, and a small part in the southwestern part (around Islaz) of Teleorman County. The county was disbanded with the administrative reform of 6 September 1950.

A proposal to bring back the name Romanați to the modern-day Olt County for changing its name to "Olt-Romanați County" was first suggested in 2017, but a name referendum held on 6 and 7 October 2018 failed to get enough votes to validate it, and thus, the name change proposal was unsuccessful.

== Administrative organization ==
The counties of Wallachia after 1601, including Romanați

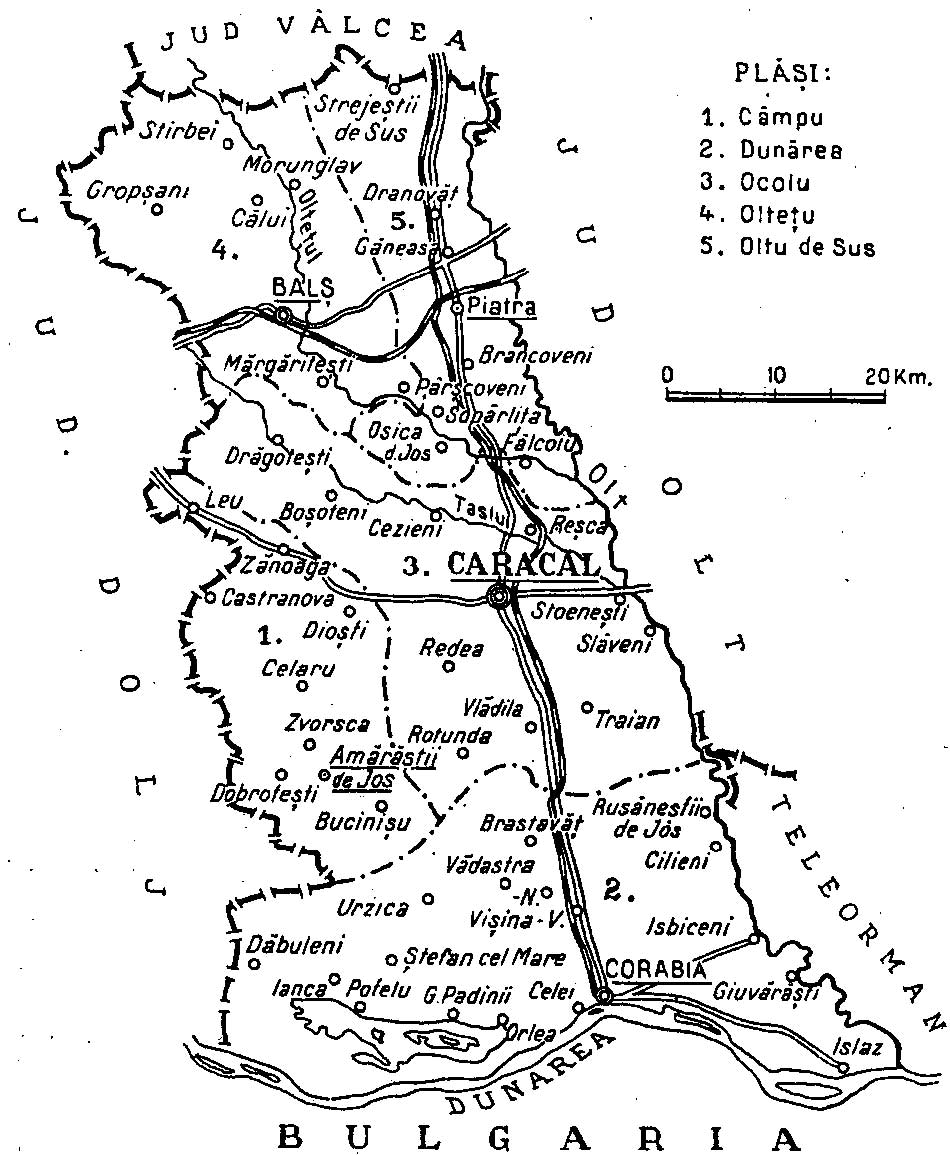
Romanați County as constituted in 1938.

Administratively, Romanaṭi County was divided into three districts (plăși):

1. Plasa Dunărea
2. Plasa Ocolu
3. Plasa Oltu de Sus

Subsequently, two more districts were established:

4. Plasa Câmpu
5. Plasa Oltețu

== Population ==
According to the 1930 census data, the county population was 271,096 inhabitants, ethnically divided as follows: 98.4% Romanians, 1.1% Romanies, as well as other minorities. From the religious point of view, the population was 99.6% Eastern Orthodox, 0.1% Roman Catholic, as well as other minorities.

=== Urban population ===
In 1930, the county's urban population (the three communes of Caracal, Corabia, and Balș) was 29,308 inhabitants, comprising 94.2% Romanians, 2.9% Romanies, 0.5% Hungarians, 0.5% Jews, 0.4% Greeks, 0.3% Germans, as well as other minorities. From the religious point of view, the urban population was composed of 97.8% Eastern Orthodox, 0.8% Roman Catholic, 0.6% Jewish, 0.2% Greek Catholic, 0.2% Lutheran, 0.2% Calvinist, as well as other minorities.
