= Caracal, Romania =

Caracal
- Municipality
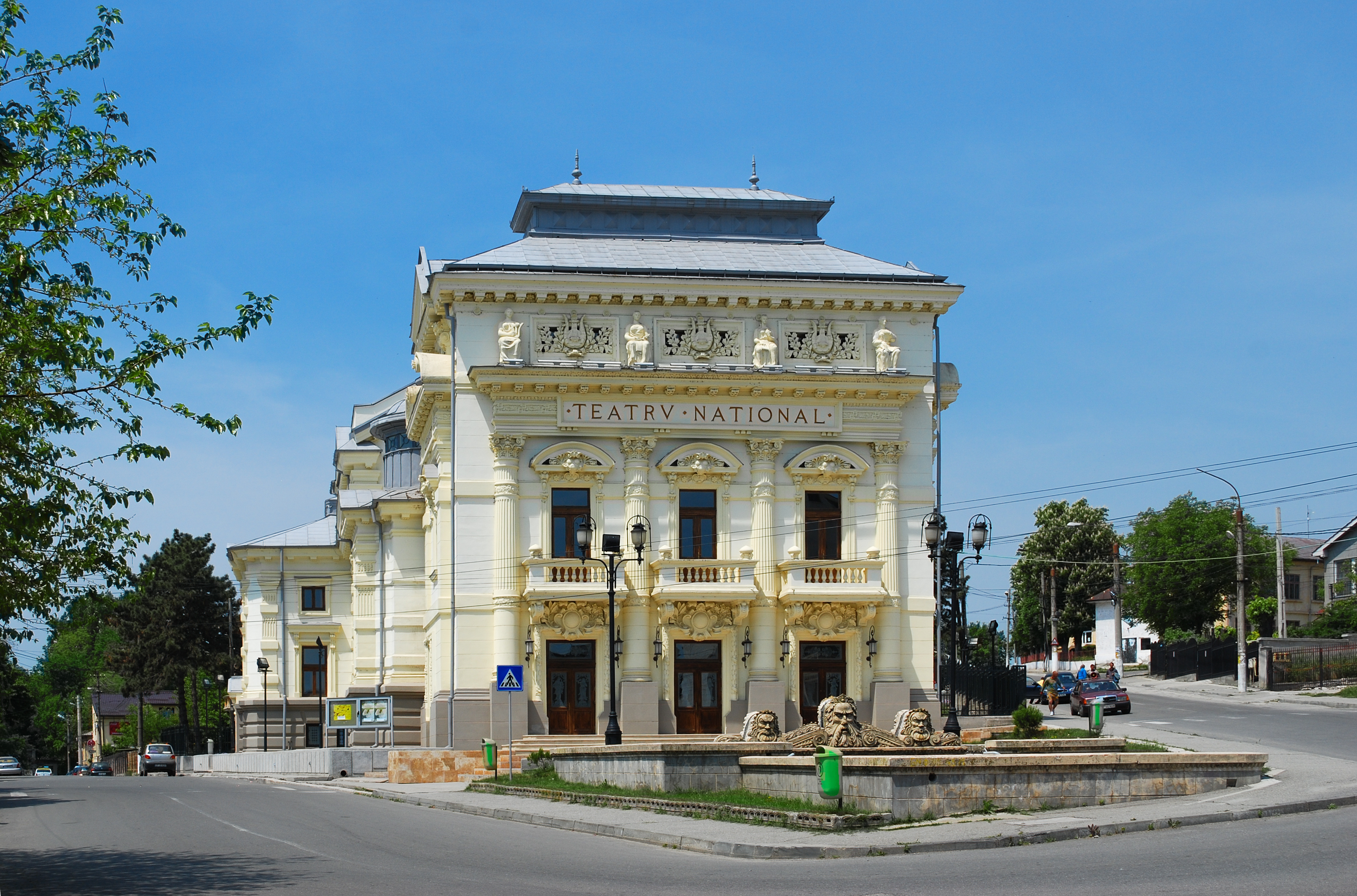
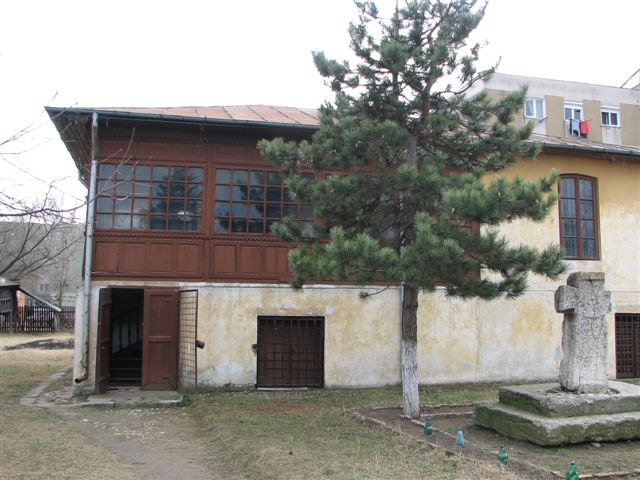
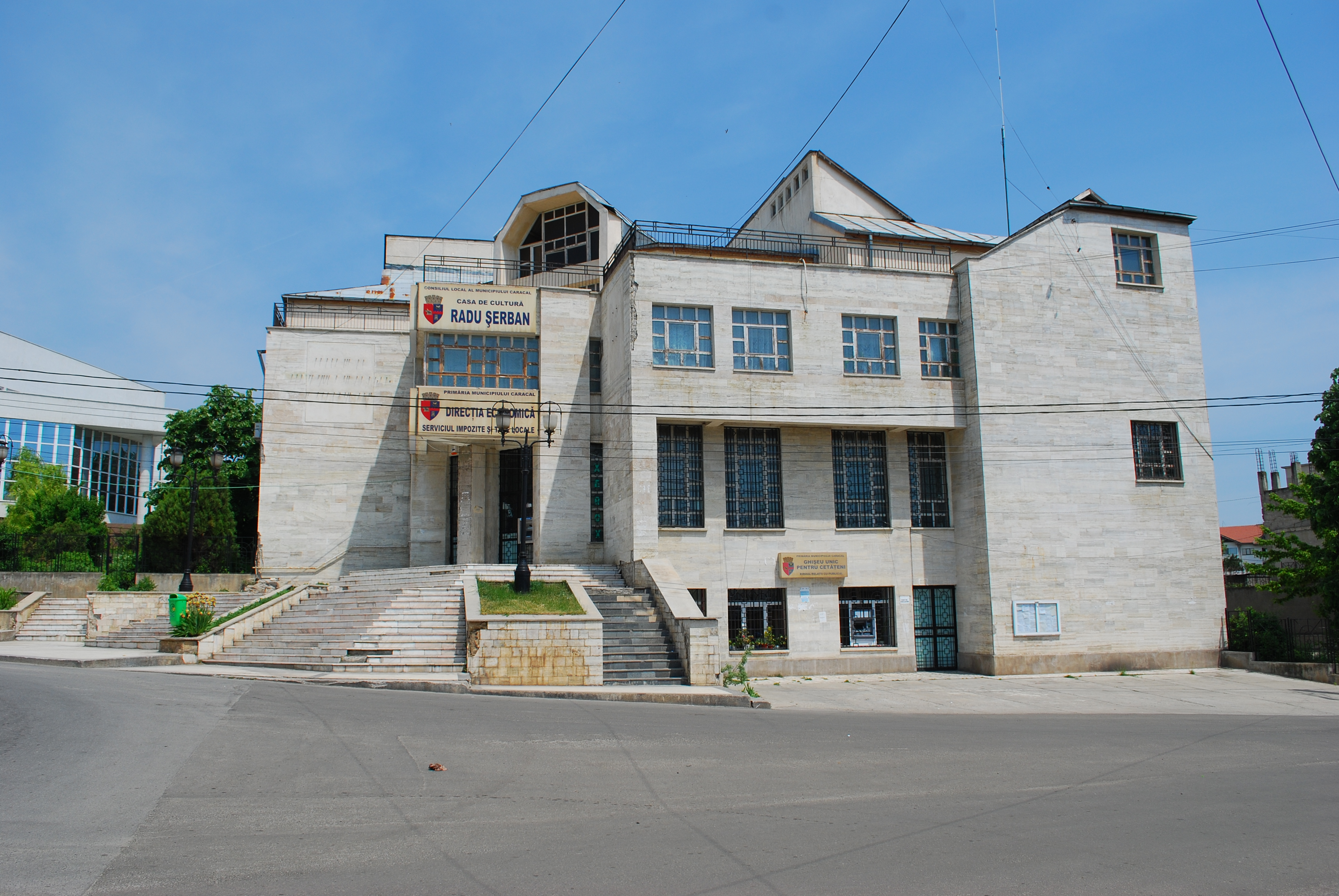
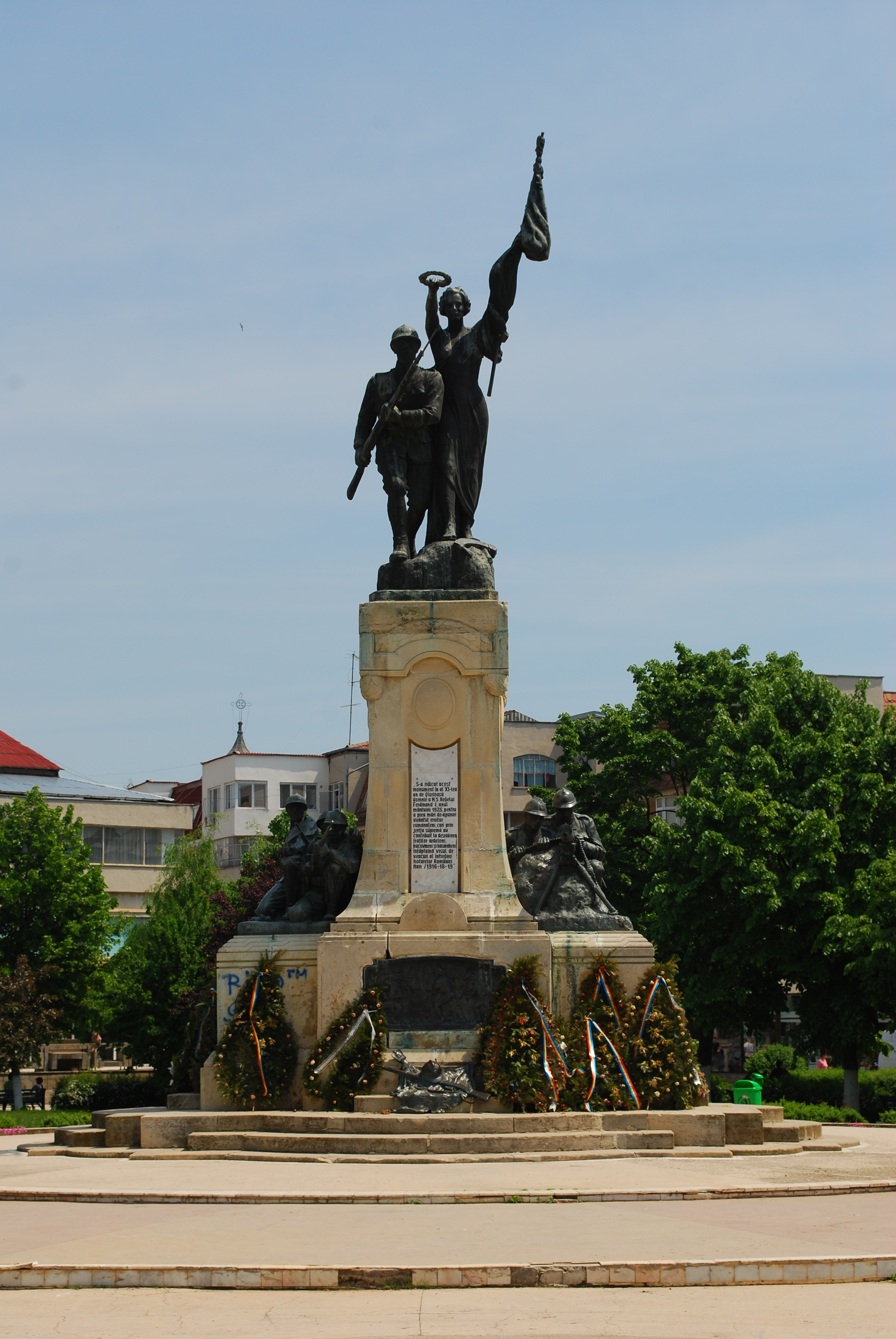
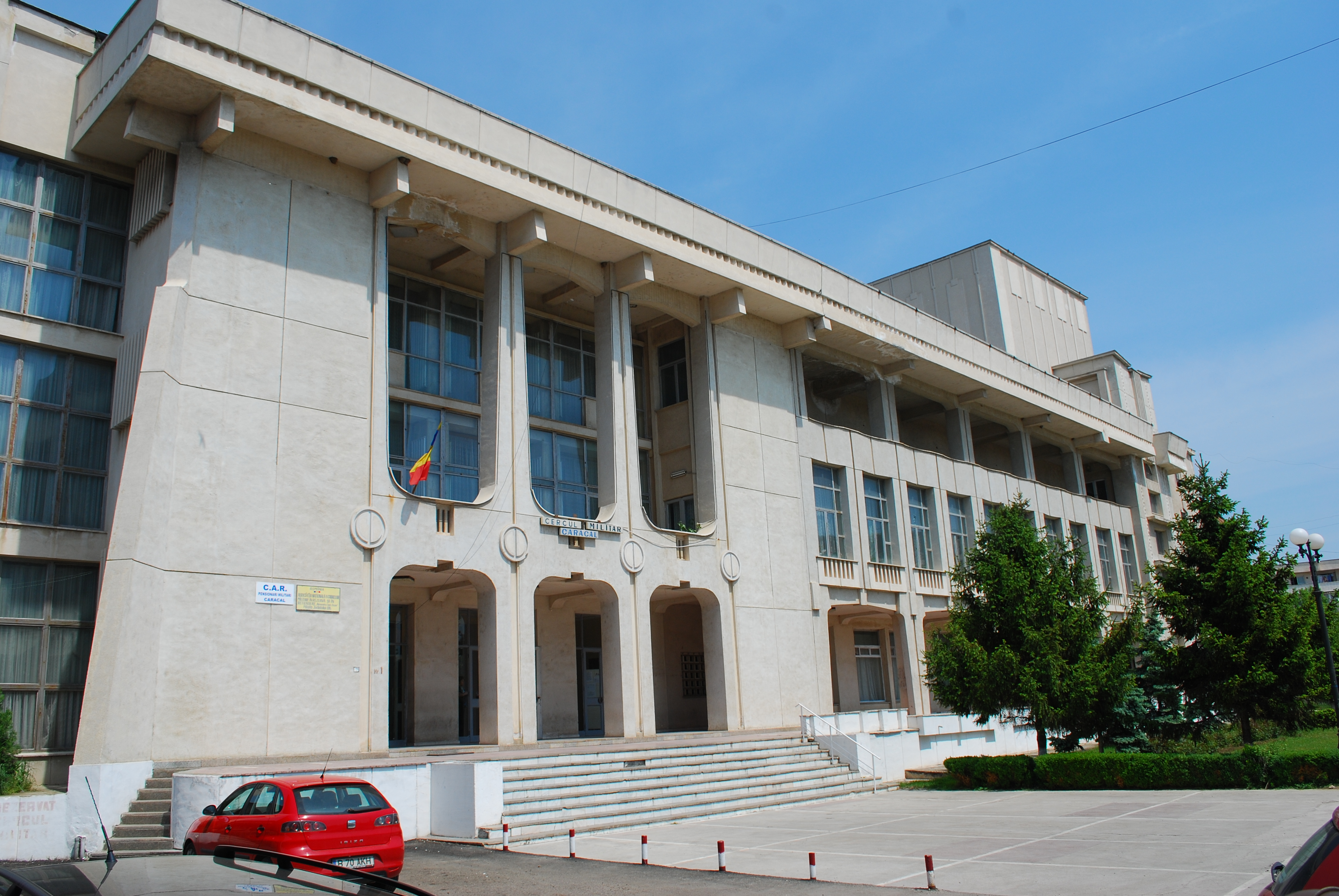
- The National Theater from Caracal Iancu Jianu Memorial House Radu Șerban Cultural Center WWI Heroes Monument Military center

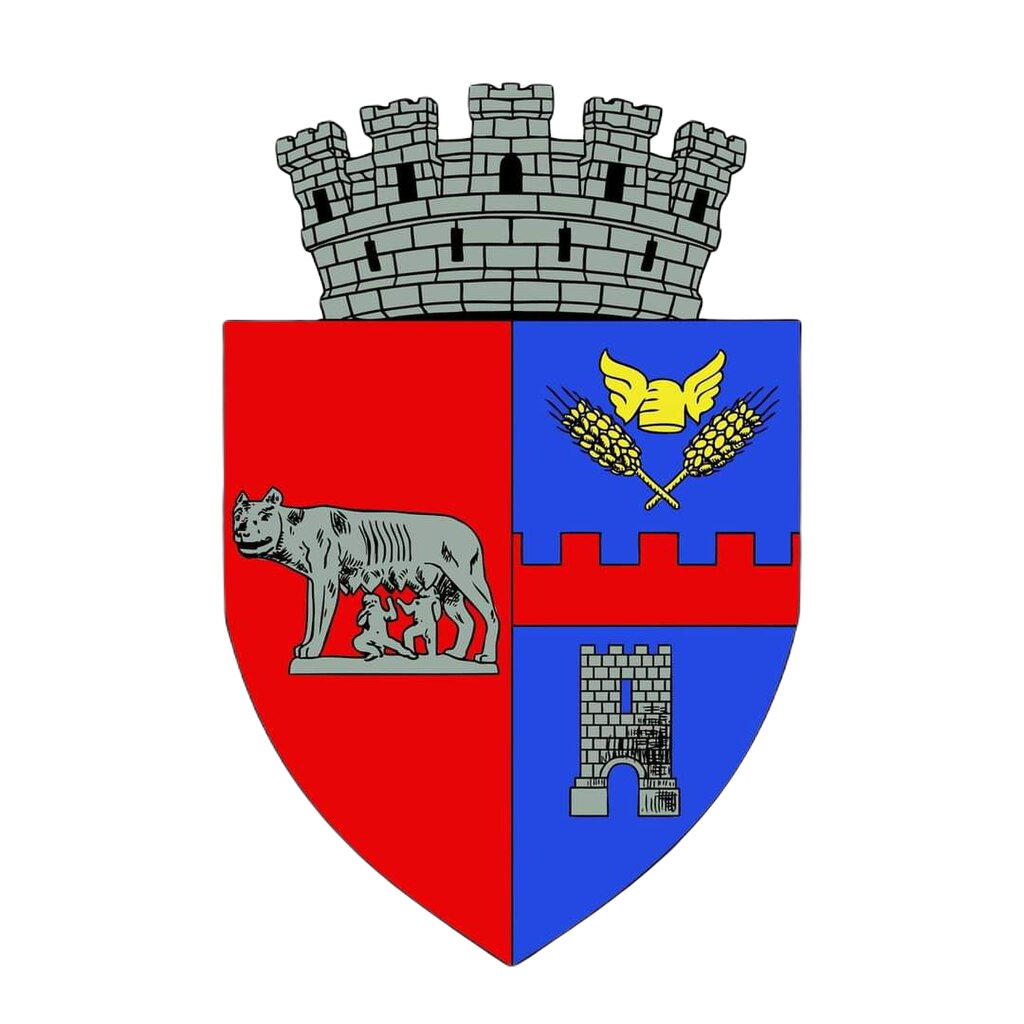
- Coat of arms

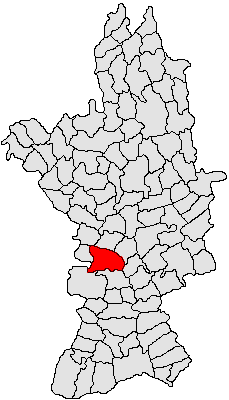
- Location in Olt County

- Location in Romania
- Coordinates: 44°06′45″N 24°20′50″E
- Country: Romania
- County: Olt

Government
  - Mayor (2024–2028): Ion Doldurea (PSD)
- Area: 69.64 km^{2} (26.89 sq mi)
- Elevation: 95 m (312 ft)
- Population (2021-12-01): 27,403
  - Density: 393.5/km^{2} (1,019/sq mi)
- Time zone: UTC+02:00 (EET)
  - Summer (DST): UTC+03:00 (EEST)
- Postal code: 235200
- Area code: (+40) 02 49
- Vehicle reg.: OT
- Website: www.primariacaracal.ro

Caracal (Romanian pronunciation: [kaˈrakal]) is a city in Olt County, Romania, situated in the historic region of Oltenia, on the plains between the lower reaches of the Jiu and Olt rivers. The region's plains are well known for their agricultural specialty in cultivating grains and over the centuries, Caracal has been the trading center for the region's agricultural output. Caracal has a population of 27,403 and is the second largest city in the region.

== Etymology ==
While 19th century historians thought that the name of Caracal is linked to Roman emperor Caracalla, the current accepted etymology is that city's name is derived from the Cuman language kara kale meaning "black fortress" (kara, meaning "black", and kal, either from the Turkish kale, or the Arabic qal'at, both meaning fortress).

== History ==
The end of the 19th century and the first half of the 20th century saw Caracal experience significant growth, while the surrounding region became one of Romania's important agricultural areas. Caracal was the capital and administrative seat of Romanați County.

During World War II, the Romanian authorities established an internment camp near Caracal for Jews evacuated from areas considered militarily sensitive. The camp operated in 1941 under the regime of Ion Antonescu and held Jews, primarily from Moldavia, whom the authorities regarded as politically unreliable. It was not part of the German Nazi concentration camp system, and no organized killing operations were carried out there. The camp was closed in December 1941, and the remaining internees were returned to urban areas near their places of origin.

Following the war, the communist regime abolished Romanați County and pursued industrialization in Caracal, resulting in the establishment of textile and other industrial plants.

The town underwent major economic changes after the overthrow of the Nicolae Ceaușescu regime during the Romanian Revolution of December 1989, when a number of local factories closed or declined during the transition to a market economy.

== Demographics ==
Historical population
| Year | Pop. | ±% |
|---|---|---|
| 1859 | 5,638 | — |
| 1899 | 12,947 | +129.6% |
| 1912 | 15,048 | +16.2% |
| 1930 | 14,950 | −0.7% |
| 1948 | 17,892 | +19.7% |
| 1956 | 19,082 | +6.7% |
| 1966 | 22,714 | +19.0% |
| 1977 | 30,408 | +33.9% |
| 1992 | 39,130 | +28.7% |
| 2002 | 34,603 | −11.6% |
| 2011 | 30,954 | −10.5% |
| 2021 | 27,403 | −11.5% |
Source: Census data

== Twin town ==
- Næstved, Denmark

== Natives ==
- Gheorghe Argeșanu (1883–1940), cavalry general and politician who served as a Prime Minister of Romania in September 1939
- Silviu Bălace (born 1978), football player and manager
- Marius Bunescu (1881–1971), painter, organizer of the National Museum of Art, and director of the Anastase Simu Museum
- Virgil Carianopol (1908–1984), poet
- Dan Diaconescu (born 1967), journalist, politician, and TV presenter
- Aurelian Titu Dumitrescu (born 1956), poet, essayist, and journalist
- Doru Frunzulică (born 1959), politician
- Iancu Jianu (1787–1842), Wallachian hajduk
- Haralamb Lecca (1873–1920), poet, playwright, and translator
- Nicolae Paul Mihail (1923–2013), writer and screenwriter
- Vasile Obedeanu (1834–1902), military officer during the Crimean War and the Romanian War of Independence, politician
- Radu Șerban (1927–1984), composer of easy listening music
- Marius Tucă (born 1966), journalist and TV host
- Iulian Vladu (born 1982), footballer
