= Ioan Nicolae Romanescu =

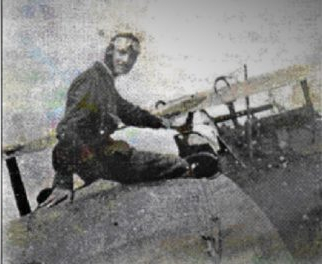
- Ioan N. Romanescu, in the cockpit of a Nieuport
- Born: 14 April 1895; Liège, Belgium
- Died: 1 November 1918 (aged 23); Sissonne-Rethel region, France
- Burial place: Nécropole nationale de Rethel
- Military career
- Allegiance: Romania; France
- Branch: Romanian Air Corps (1914-1917); Aéronautique Militaire (1918)
- Service years: 1914-1918
- Rank: Corporal
- Unit: Escadrille Spa.12 (1 October - 1 November 1918)
- Conflicts: First World War; Battle of Turtucaia; Argonne offensive †
- Awards: Virtutea Militară (posthumously); Croix de Guerre (posthumously)

Ioan "Ionel" Nicolae Romanescu (14 April 1895 – 1 November 1918) or Jean Romanesco in French was a Romanian pilot and aviation pioneer, he built and flew the first glider in Romania in 1910.

== Early life ==
Born at Liège on 14 April 1895, he was the son of Nicolae P. Romanescu. When he was 5 years old, he returned to Craiova with his mother. In his early years, he studied at the "Javait" Institute, from the Boys' School no. 3 "Ion Heliade Rădulescu" and at the Carol I High School. He passionately loved science, especially mechanics from a young age. He was passionate about cars, motorcycles and airplanes. He bought books and magazines about the first flyers and dedicated his time to documenting, designing and building gliders and learning how to fly.

=== First aircraft projects ===
He set up a small workshop in the attic of the house in which he built the tail and the wings of a biplane, from the rows of perches, a few pieces of wire and pieces of tin cut and drilled with primitive tools. He would abandon this first project and begin to build a monoplane named no. 2. Finally, after much toil and successive design changes, in 1910, at the age of 15, he completed the glider under the supervision of professor Henri Auguste, which he called no. 3. It was a biplane on skates with which, pulled with a rope by two schoolmates, he rose to a height of 70 cm on the Hippodrome from the Bibescu Park.

In 1911, while on holiday, in the presence of his mother, brothers and friends, at the Movilă resort, which was later called Carmen Sylva and then Eforie Sud, he set off from the rocky shore of the beach with a new glider, a small and simple monoplane, which he could dismantle in 15 minutes and carry on his back. This was the first glider flight made on the Romanian shore of the Black Sea.

In order to divert him from the dangerous passion of gliding, his parents sent him to the "Costache Negruzzi" Boarding High School in Iași. However, only a few months after arriving at the new school in April 1912, he took flight with a new biplane that he built there. While at his new school, he would set up the first glider club in the country, and also meet and befriend another aviation enthusiast, Horia Hulubei. He would design another glider, also a biplane, which he called "H. Rallet 5". This aircraft was used by gliding enthusiasts to make flights from Copou Hill, or from being towed by a car.

He was 17 when his glider flights were officially recognized by the publication La Revue Aerienne. On 12 October 1912, the editorial staff of the Parisian magazine confirmed the receipt of the documentation sent by the second-year student Ioan Romanescu from the boarding school in Iași-Romania, calling him "the youngest glider builder".

In 1914, Romanescu returned to the "Carol I" High School in Craiova, and from 1 October he enrolled in the Faculty of Sciences of the University of Bucharest, Mathematics department. Arriving in the capital, he carefully researched the construction of the French airplanes of the Romanian armed forces. In 1915, with this new knowledge, he started working on a large biplane of the "Canard Voisin" type in the gymnasium of the Military School from Craiova. Through the innumerable modifications brought by him, it was going to be a novelty in the field of aviation. Construction of the airplane continued in 1916 and he planned to take the airplane to Bucharest for testing and patenting.

== Military service during World War I ==
Unfortunately for the plans of the young inventor, Romania entered the war on 27 August 1916. Ioan Romanescu enlisted voluntarily in the aviation corps even after the outbreak of war in 1914 and even though he had not yet reached the age to be called to the army. The war did not give him time to carry out aviation projects. Still, in his free time between patrol missions, he pursued the refinement of his inventions, seeking to develop a fast airplane for post-war times.

On the Romanian front, he flew as an observer during the Battle of Turtucaia. However, he wanted to become a fighter pilot, so he was transferred to the flight school at Bârlad, then at Botoșani. Due to the lack of airplanes in the Romanian Air Corps, he could not participate in the summer campaign of 1917. He remained in the flight school for further training, which was later transferred to Odessa. While at Odessa, he would fly in a Nieuport fighter for the first time, fulfilling his dream of piloting an airplane.

After the October Revolution, he was arrested on 29 January 1918, together with 37 other officers and Romanian pilots, being imprisoned on the battleship Ekaterina Velikaya. They would be released on 15 February, after negotiating with the bolsheviks. Romanescu acted as a translator between the representatives of the French Military Mission and the Russians. On departure, the French Mission agreed to take him, Radu Beller and Alexandru Danielescu, three Romanian aviators who enlisted in the Foreign Legion. Arriving at Murmansk, they signed a commitment to the Foreign Legion for the duration of the war. The pilots arrived in Le Havre, then traveled to Bordeaux and then to Paris. Romanescu was anxious to get to the front and fulfill his duty as a soldier of the Foreign Legion, however, it will not be until 6 June when he left Paris after obtaining his pilot license. While in Paris, he designed a "small, high-speed aircraft meant to bring practical services of any kind after the end of the war", which he called "La mouche" and submitted to the French Ministry of War for patenting. Before leaving, he left the plans of the aircraft to Louis Béchereau. The French engineer proposed that Romanescu should stay in Paris in order to build it, but Romanescu refused.

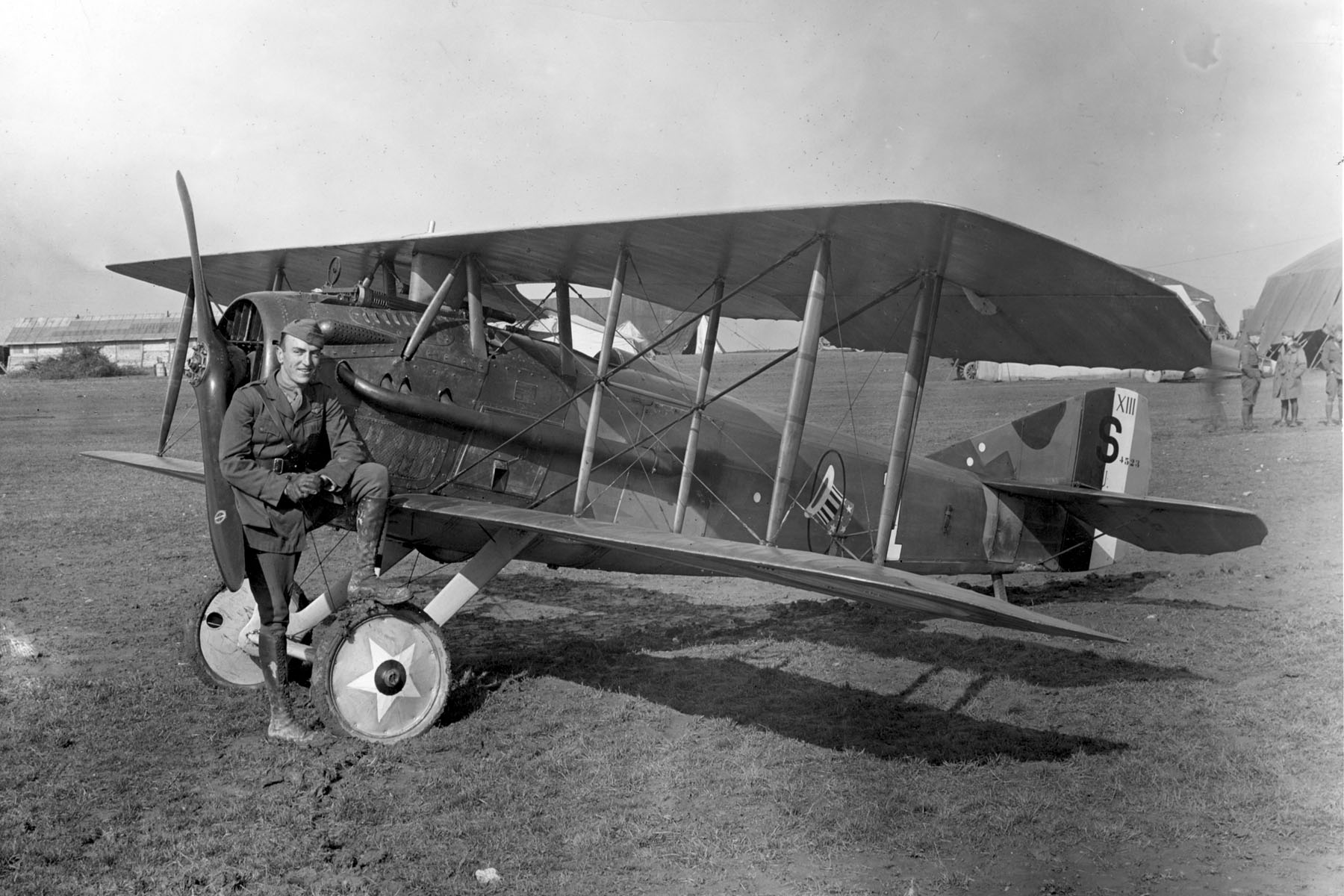
A SPAD XIII fighter aircraft

With some delays, it would not be until 1 October 1918 when he reached the front. Once there, he was assigned to Escadrille Spa.12. He was given a brand new SPAD XIII after 3 days at the squadron. After getting his airplane, he flew on combat practice flights with the other pilots, after which, on the 6th day, he flew over the front. Soon after, he would participate in his first dogfight, recounting it in a letter to his parents: "There were two of us, 4,000 meters high, against eight very aggressive Germans. The fight lasted 15 minutes and we managed to put the Germans on the run. I could have shot one down if my machine gun hadn't jammed after 12 shots. After returning, I found that my airplane, severely damaged in three places, could no longer be used. Nice result for the first fight. Before this I was considered a "freshman" and no one trusted me. Now everyone is looking to take me in formation with them."

On 1 November 1918, 10 days before the end of the war, the airplane of Corporal Ioan Romanescu, on patrol at 2000 m altitude protecting reconnaissance aircraft which were attacking the enemy infantry and supporting the advance of friendly tanks, was directly hit by a shell. Captain Armand de Turenne, the commander of the squadron, recounted the event in a letter to his parents: "Corporal Romanescu was on an air patrol in the Sissonne-Rethel region with us when suddenly his aircraft disappeared from our sight. Here's what happened: It was at the time of an attack; the ground artillery fire was very dense. Romanescu was on the trajectory of a shell that exploded on contact with his machine, the airplane being crushed to pieces. Death was so sudden that he didn't even have time to see it coming. We were so sorry to lose this young man, he was an excellent pilot, brave in the face of danger and, above all, a great comrade."

Romanescu's airplane crashed in flames, during the sixth mission in which the Romanian pilot participated that day. After the end of the fighting - on 11 November - the command of the unit found the charred remains of an airplane near Attigny and next to it the grave of a pilot, and a cross with no name written on it. In all likelihood, the military authority determined that it was the tomb of the Romanian corporal.

He was awarded posthumously with the Romanian Virtutea Militară medal and French Croix de Guerre avec palme. He is buried at the National Necropolis of Rethel, grave no. 1645, his cross writes "Romanesco Jean, Caporal aviateur, Mort pour la France le 1-11-1918".
