= Șerbești =

Şerbeşti or Serbestî may refer to:

- Șerbești River
- Serbestî, an Ottoman newspaper founded in 1908
- Şerbeşti, a village in Ciortești, Iaşi County, Romania
- Şerbeşti, a village in Săucești, Bacău County, Romania
- Şerbeşti, a village in Vidra, Vrancea, Romania
- Şerbeştii Vechi, a village in Șendreni Commune, Galați County, Romania
- Șerbești, the former name of Ștefan cel Mare Commune, Neamț County, Romania

== See also ==
- Șerban (name)
- Șerbăneasa (disambiguation)
- Șerbănești (disambiguation)
- Șerbănescu (surname)
