= Șerbănescu =

Șerbănescu is a family name common in Romania.

- Alexandru Șerbănescu (1912–1944), Romanian World War II flying ace
- Horia Șerbănescu, music hall performer
- Ilie Șerbănescu, Romanian economist
- Theodor Șerbănescu (1839–1901), Moldavian-born Romanian poet
- Tia Şerbănescu, journalist and essayist

== Others ==
- Şerbănescu is also the maiden name of Elena or Nina Iliescu, the wife of former President Ion Iliescu.

== See also ==
- Șerban (name)
- Șerbești (disambiguation)
- Șerbăneasa (disambiguation)
- Șerbănești (disambiguation)
