= Iliescu (surname) =

Iliescu is a Romanian surname. Notable people with the surname include:

- Ilariu Dobridor (born Constantin Iliescu Cioroianu; 1908–1968), Romanian poet, journalist and politician
- Adriana Iliescu (born 1938), Romanian university lecturer and children's writer
- Constantin I. Iliescu, Romanian politician
- Dragoș Iliescu (born 1974), Romanian psychologist
- Ion Iliescu (1930–2025), Romanian politician and engineer, President of Romania (1989–1996; 2000–2004)
- Juan Iliesco (1898–1968), Romanian-born Argentine chess player
- Mihai Iliescu (born 1978), Romanian bobsledder
- Șerban Iliescu (1956–2016), Romanian linguist and journalist
- Tiberiu Iliescu (1906–1978), Romanian writer and editor
