= Șerbănești (disambiguation) =

Șerbănești may refer to:

- Șerbănești, a commune in Olt County, Romania
- Șerbănești, a village in Poienarii de Muscel Commune, Argeș County, Romania
- Șerbănești, a village in Rociu Commune, Argeș County, Romania
- Șerbănești, a village in Liești Commune, Galați County, Romania
- Șerbănești, a village in Zvoriștea Commune, Suceava County, Romania
- Șerbănești, a village in Lăpușata Commune, Vâlcea County, Romania
- Șerbănești, a village in Păușești Commune, Vâlcea County, Romania
- Șerbănești, a village in Sălătrucel Commune, Vâlcea County, Romania
- Șerbănești, a village in Ștefănești Commune, Vâlcea County, Romania
- Șerbănești, a village in Corbița Commune, Vrancea County, Romania

== See also ==
- Șerban (name)
- Șerbești (disambiguation)
- Șerbăneasa (disambiguation)
- Șerbănescu (surname)
