= Șerbăneasa =

Șerbăneasa may refer to several places in Romania:

- Șerbăneasa, a village in Valea Lungă Commune, Dâmbovița County
- Șerbăneasa, a village in Nicolae Bălcescu Commune, Vâlcea County
- Șerbăneasa (river), a tributary of the river Topolog in Vâlcea County

== See also ==
- Șerban (name)
- Șerbești (disambiguation)
- Șerbănești (disambiguation)
- Șerbănescu (surname)
