= Mihail Șerban (biochemist) =

- Born: June 11, 1930; Craiova, Kingdom of Romania
- Died: July 7, 2004 (aged 74); Romania
- Education: Carol I National College
- Alma mater: University of Bucharest
- Occupation: Biochemist

Mihail Șerban (June 11, 1930 – July 7, 2004) was a Romanian biochemist.

Born in Craiova, he attended the city's Carol I High School. He then graduated from the chemistry faculty of the University of Bucharest, following which he earned a doctorate in 1963. Until the end of his life, he taught biochemistry at the veterinary medicine faculty of the University of Agronomic Sciences and Veterinary Medicine. His research focused on the comparative biochemistry of cerebral and muscular proteins, enzymology, synthesis of new molecular compounds with applications in biochemistry, and mechanisms of metabolic regulation and control. Together or in collaboration, he authored fourteen monographs and some 280 articles, many of which were reviewed and cited abroad. He patented eighteen inventions. Elected a corresponding member of the Romanian Academy in 1991, he was raised to titular membership in 2001.
