= Mihail Șerban =

Mihail Șerban may refer to:

- Mihail Șerban (biochemist) (1930–2004), Romanian biochemist
- Mihail Șerban (writer) (1911–1994), Romanian prose writer
