= Șerb =

Șerb is a Romanian-language surname literally meaning "serf". Notable people with the surname include:

- Ion Șerb (1926–2004), Romanian general
- Teodor Șerb, Romanian general and politician

== See also ==
- Șerban
