= Craiova Hippodrome =

Coordinates: 44.295227°N 23.80909°E

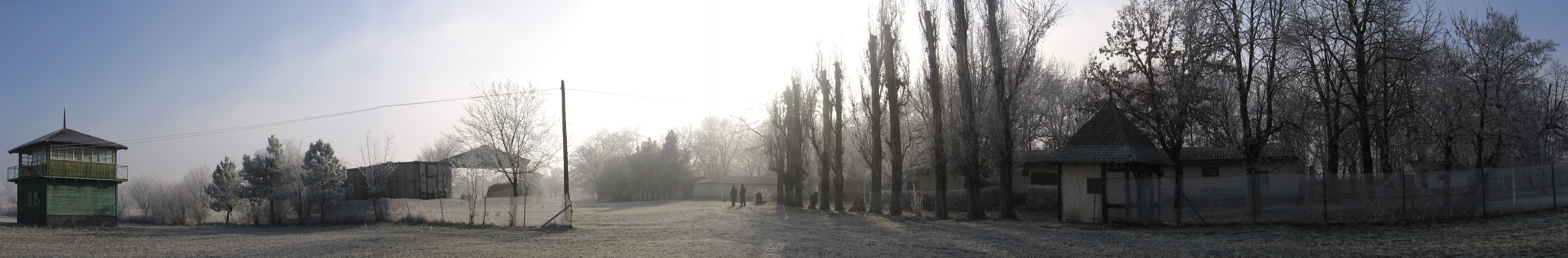
Hipodromul Craiova

The Hippodrome can be found within the Nicolae Romanescu Park in the South of Craiova, Romania.

Today, the park is included in the National monument list on the 98th position. The hippodrome occupies about 20,50 hectares from a total of 96 that belong to the park. Opened for the public in 1903, in a period of great importance for equestrianism in England and France, the hippodrome was indispensable for the social and economic life of the city. Édouard Redont himself, in his book about the designing and building of the park states that "This hippodrome will obtain for the city the necessary funds that will be added to the maintenance of the park".

The grandstand designed by Redont was never built due to lack of funds, a smaller tribune was built instead. Made of wood, it burned to the ground soon after the inauguration of the hippodrome, being rebuilt in concrete.

After World War II the races stopped at the hippodrome, never to be restored. A Show Jumping field was set in front of the tribune, and another stand was built on the other side of the field.

From 1957 until 2000 many Show Jumping events took place here, including the first Balcanic Equestrian Games in Romania. From the year 2000, due to the lack of money, the hippodrome's activity diminished considerably.

Currently, the hippodrome is affiliated to the Romanian Equestrian Federation and it is managed by the Municipal Sports Club of Craiova.

== Bibliography ==
- Redont Edouard, Ville de Craiova, Paris, 1904
- Firan Florea, Parcul Poporului din Craiova, Comitetul de cultură şi artă al municipiului Craiova, 1975
