= Șerban =

Șerban is a common name in Romania. It may be phonetically transcribed as Sherban or written without diacritics as Serban. It is also used by the Aromanians. Notable persons named Șerban include:

== Surname ==
- Alina Șerban, Roma actress and writer
- Andrei Șerban, Romanian-born American theatre director
- Carmen Șerban, Romanian country-folk-dance singer
- Chris Șerban, Canadian soccer player
- Constantin Șerban, prince of Wallachia (1654–1658)
- Dennis Șerban, Romanian football player
- George Șerban, Romanian journalist, politician and writer
- Gianina Șerban, Romanian politician
- Mihail Șerban (disambiguation), one of two individuals
- Radu Șerban, prince of Wallachia

== Given name ==
- Nicolae Șerban Tanașoca, Romanian historian and philologist of Aromanian ethnicity
- Șerban Bascovici, Romanian poet
- Șerban Cantacuzino, prince of Wallachia (1678-1688)
- Șerban Cantacuzino (actor), Romanian actor
- Serban Cantacuzino (architect), Romanian architect
- Șerban Cioculescu, Romanian literary critic
- Șerban Foarță, Romanian writer
- Serban Ghenea, Canadian audio engineer and mixer
- Șerban Huidu, Romanian television personality
- Șerban Iliescu, Romanian linguist and journalist
- Șerban Marinescu, Romanian director and screenwriter
- Șerban Nichifor, Romanian composer
- Șerban Țițeica, Romanian physicist

== See also ==
- Zherban, a peak in Ukraine known in Romanian as Șerban
- Serban, Çorum
- Shcherban
- Șerb, Romanian family name
- Șerbu, Romanian family name
