= Carol I National College =

Coordinates: 44°19′09″N 23°47′31″E

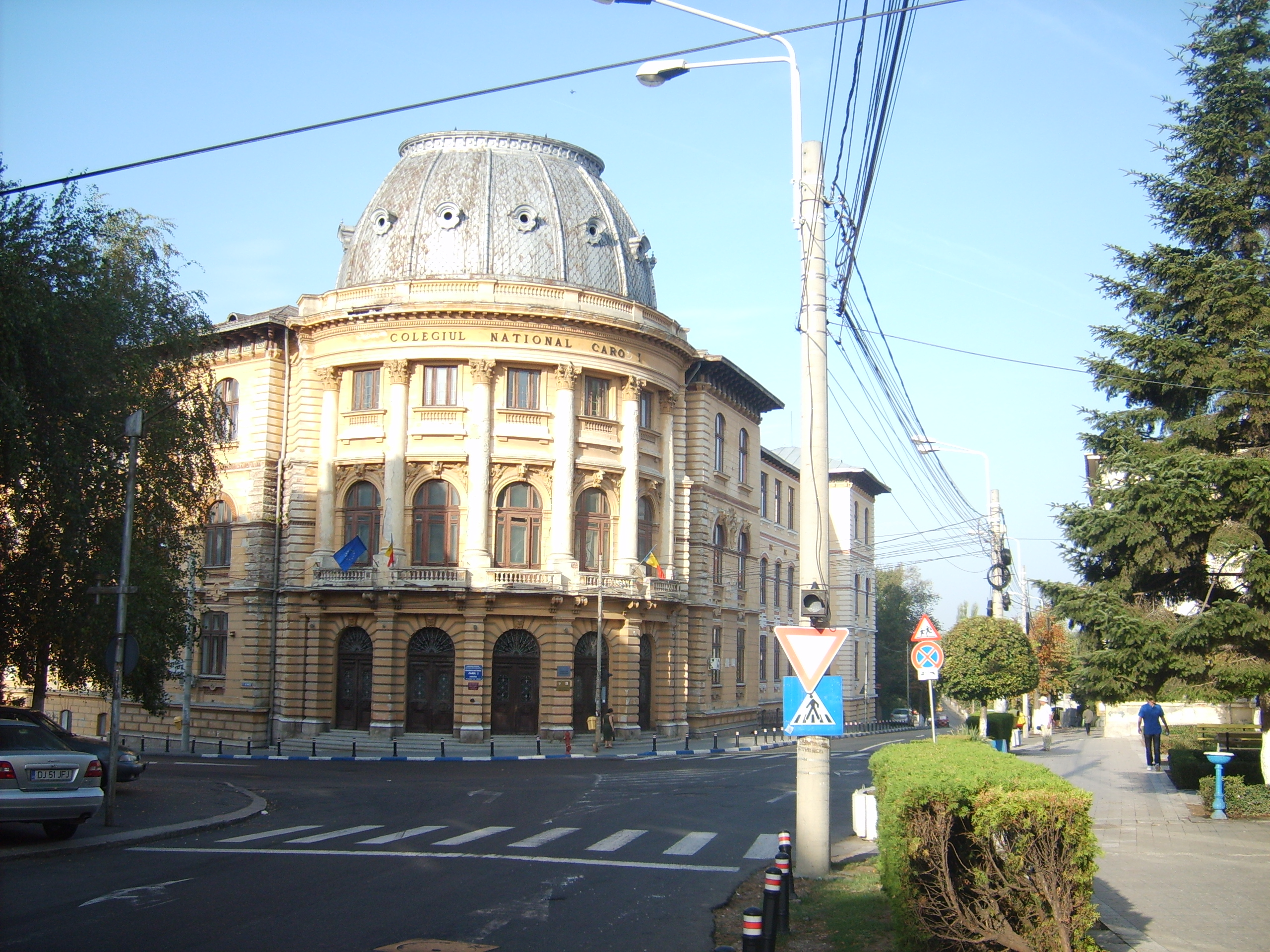
- Craiova, Romania

Information
- Type: public
- Established: 1826; 200 years ago
- Headmaster: Mic Dănuț
- Enrollment: 1800
- Campus: Urban
- Website: www.cnc.ro

The Carol I National College (Romanian: Colegiul Național Carol I din Craiova) is a high school located in central Craiova, Romania, on Ioan Maiorescu Street. It is one of the most prestigious secondary education institutions in Romania. Between 1947 and 1997 it operated under the name of Nicolae Bălcescu High School.

== History ==
The Central High School was officially established on 20 May 1826, although it was actually built 7 years later in 1833. After suffering heavy damage from the earthquake of 11 January 1838, the school was rebuilt in November 1842 and it had some 400 students.

Craiova's Central High School was renamed "Carol I Liceum" on 11 November 1885 by a Royal decree of King Carol I.

It was re-built a second time after the 1977 earthquake that demolished a major part of its buildings.

== Alumni ==
The following is a short list of the most notable alumni of the Carol I National College.

- Theodor Aman, painter and graphic artist
- Constantin Angelescu, Prime Minister
- Eugen Angelescu, chemist
- Corneliu Baba, painter
- Alexandru Balaci, philologist, literary critic
- Nicolae Bănescu, historian
- Marcu Botzan, agronomist
- Al. C. Calotescu-Neicu, columnist
- Gheorghe Chițu, lawyer and politician
- Radu Ciuceanu, historian and politician
- George Constantinescu, engineer
- Traian Demetrescu, poet, novelist, and literary critic
- George Fotino, jurist
- Dimitrie Gerota, anatomist, physician, radiologist, and urologist
- Tudor Gheorghe, musician, poet, and actor
- Traian Gheorghiu, physicist
- Radu Gyr, poet, essayist, playwright, and journalist
- Eugène Ionesco, playwright and dramatist
- Traian Lalescu, mathematician
- Alexandru Macedonski, poet, novelist, dramatist, and literary critic
- Ion Gheorghe Maurer, Prime Minister
- Titu Maiorescu, philologist, literary critic, politician
- Duiliu Marcu, architect
- Nicolas Mateesco-Matte, jurist
- Gib Mihăescu, writer
- Alexandru Mironov, science-fiction writer, journalist, and politician
- Jean Negulescu, film director, screenwriter, and a pioneer in cinemascope
- Constantin S. Nicolăescu-Plopșor, historian, archeologist, and folklorist
- Petre Pandrea, writer
- Mihai Pătrașcu, computer scientist
- Adrian Păunescu, poet
- Amza Pellea, actor
- Dionisie M. Pippidi, archaeologist and historian
- Petrache Poenaru, inventor
- Nicolae Popescu, mathematician
- Ioan Nicolae Romanescu, pilot and aviation pioneer
- Mihail Șerban, biochemist
- Sabba Ștefănescu, paleontologist
- Eraclie Sterian, physician, writer, and political activist
- Simion Stoilow, mathematician
- Eugen Taru, graphic artist
- Gheorghe Tătărescu, politician who served twice as Prime Minister of Romania and three times as Minister of Foreign Affairs
- Gheorghe Țițeica, mathematician
- Nicolae Titulescu, diplomat, politician
- Ion Țuculescu, painter
- George Vâlsan, geographer
- Nicolae Vasilescu-Karpen, engineer and physicist
- Pan M. Vizirescu, poet and essayist
- Ștefan Voitec, communist politician who served as President of the Great National Assembly
