= Nicolae Romanescu Park =

Heritage site in Dolj County, Romania

Coordinates: 44.298°N 23.808°E

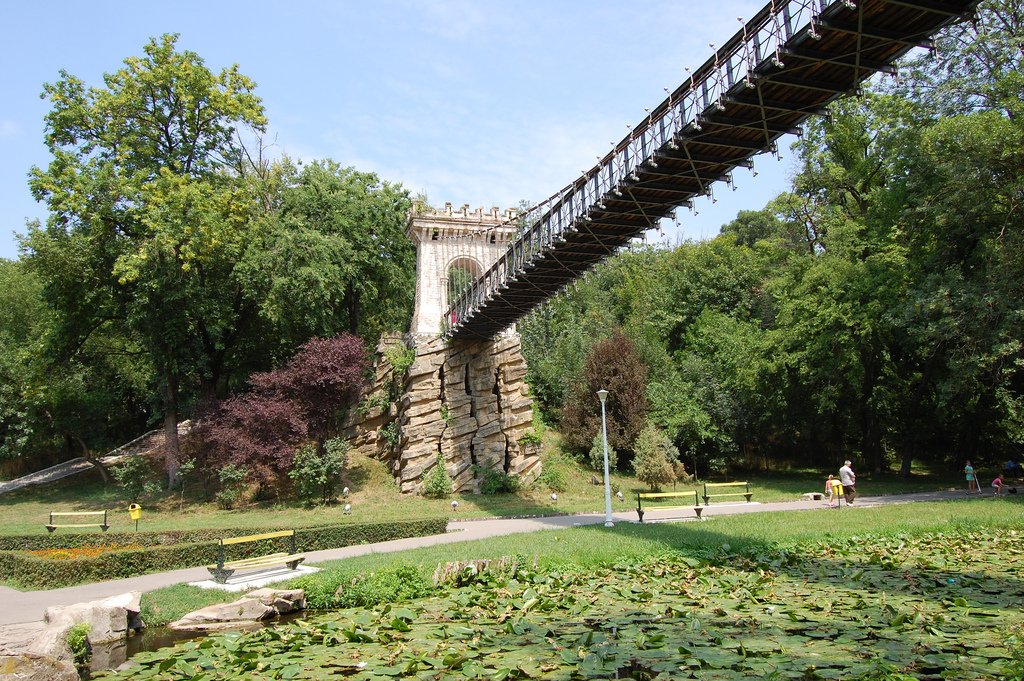
Suspended bridge

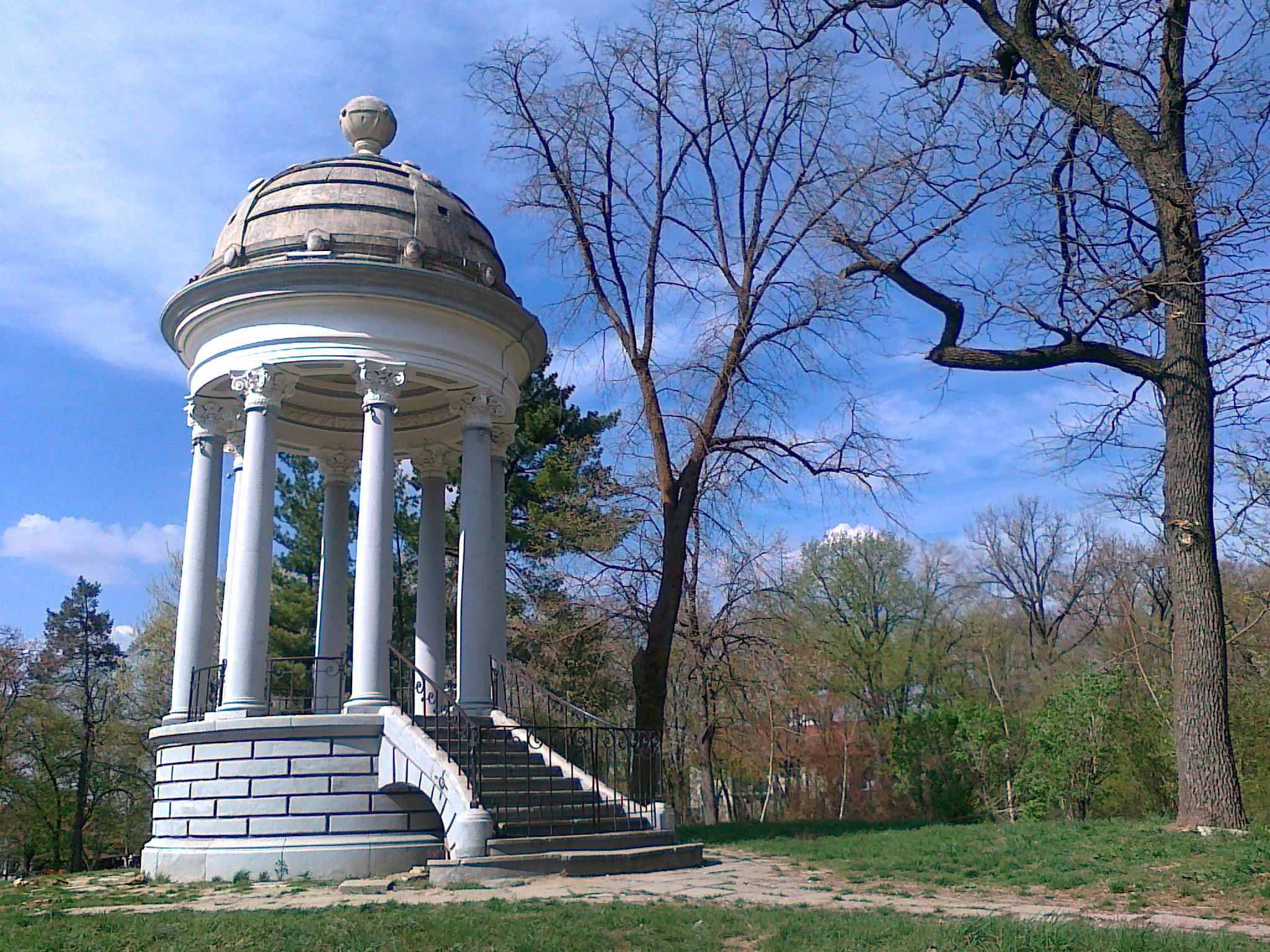

Nicolae Romanescu Park (Romanian: Parcul Nicolae Romanescu), known over time as the Bibescu Park, the Independence Park or the People's Park, is a park in Craiova, Romania. Located on the site of the mid-19th century estate and gardens of the Bibescu family, it was designed by the French architect Édouard Redont and constructed between 1897 and 1903. It is wrongly considered in pop culture as the largest natural park in Eastern Europe. It is actually an urban park. The park was built in a romantic style, a synthesis of landscape architecture and painting.

== The park ==
In 1898, after the election of Nicolae Romanescu as mayor, a project for the modernization of the city was voted for. One of the objectives of the program being to establish parks and gardens. The architect appointed to carry out this project was Édouard Redont, who also designed the National Exhibition from the Carol Park in Bucharest.

Redont took the project of the future Romanescu Park to the 1900 Paris Exposition, the project being awarded the Gold Medal. At the time of drafting the project, he came up with very bold ideas: hundreds of species of trees were acclimatized, trees that normally do not grow in the climatic conditions of Romania, he redesigned the lake, designed the suspension bridge, designed the castle, improvised hills and valleys, roads, alleys and paths that total over 35 km in length, everything being worked in the smallest detail. It was inaugurated in 1903 in the presence of King Carol.

This park features:

1. The Suspended Bridge – a suspended bridge built in 1901–1902.
2. The "Enchanted Castle" – a castle on one of the hills, near the bridge, built in 1905 to mask the water tower of the park. During the communist regime, it was converted to a restaurant.
3. The Craiova Hippodrome – inaugurated in 1903, used for trotting and galloping horse races and is now used for athletics competitions.
4. The lake – a lake with a fountain in the middle of the park. The surface covered by water in the park is over 4 ha.
5. Glorieta (the belvedere dome) – is on a hill at the entrance to the park behind the bust of Nicolae P. Romanescu.
6. The zoo – one of the oldest zoological gardens in Romania. Initially hosting bears, deer, peacocks as well as other local fauna, it now hosts a large number of exotic animals such as jaguars, tigers, lions, ostrichs, emus, capuchin monkeys, llamas and others. It is located close to the lake.

In 1943, as a tribute to the person who worked closely on the construction of the park, a bust of N. Romanescu was built at the main entrance. Over time, numerous works have been carried out that have enhanced the beauty of the park. Between 1954-1956, the existing portal was built at the main entrance, the fencing with pillars and concrete base and wire mesh was made, the pier was rebuilt and enlarged. In 1964, the public lighting was modernized and a greenhouse was built.

The total area of the park close to 100 hectares (250 acres) and the area of the lake within the park is about 4 hectares (9.9 acres).

== Gallery ==
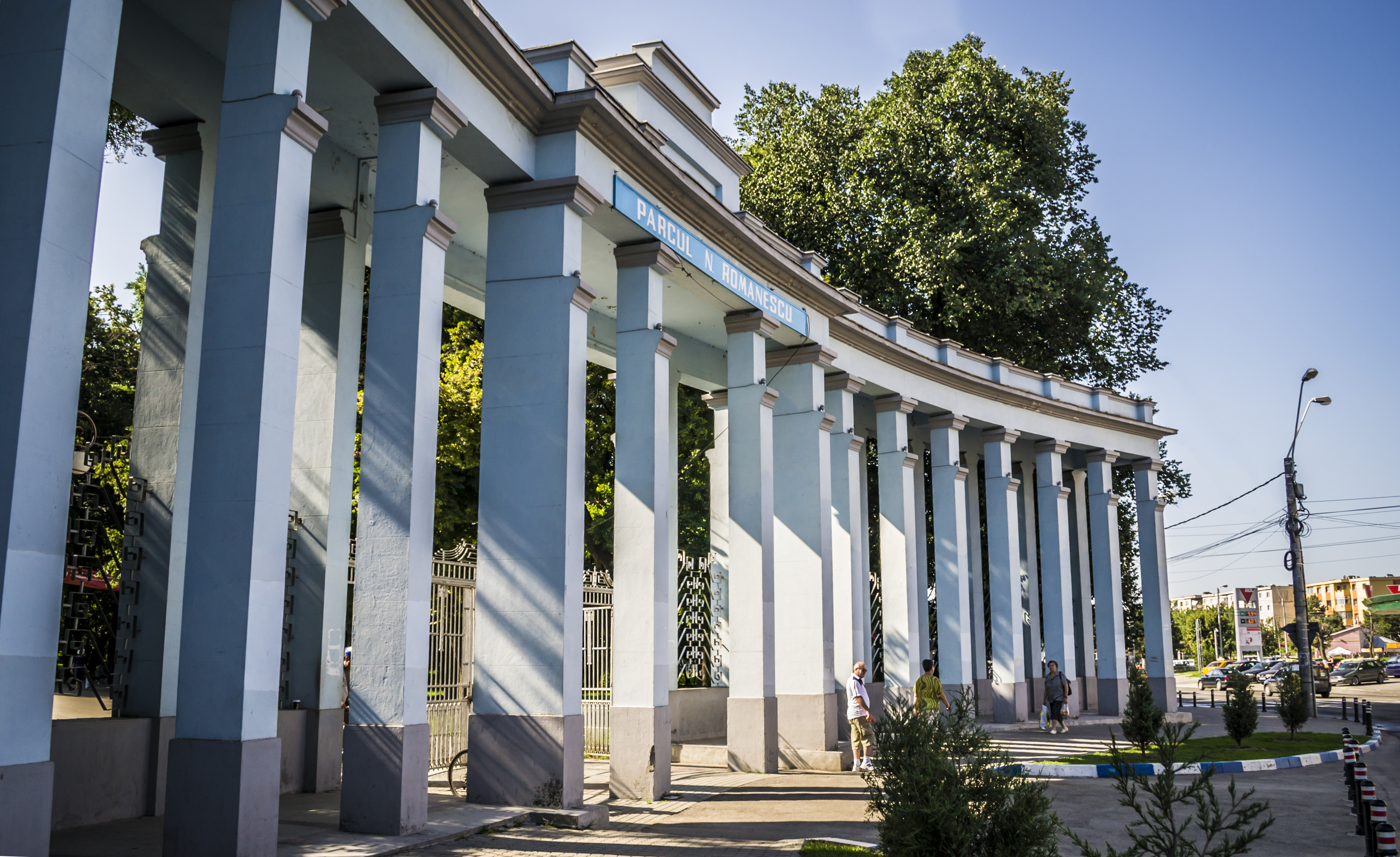
Park entrance

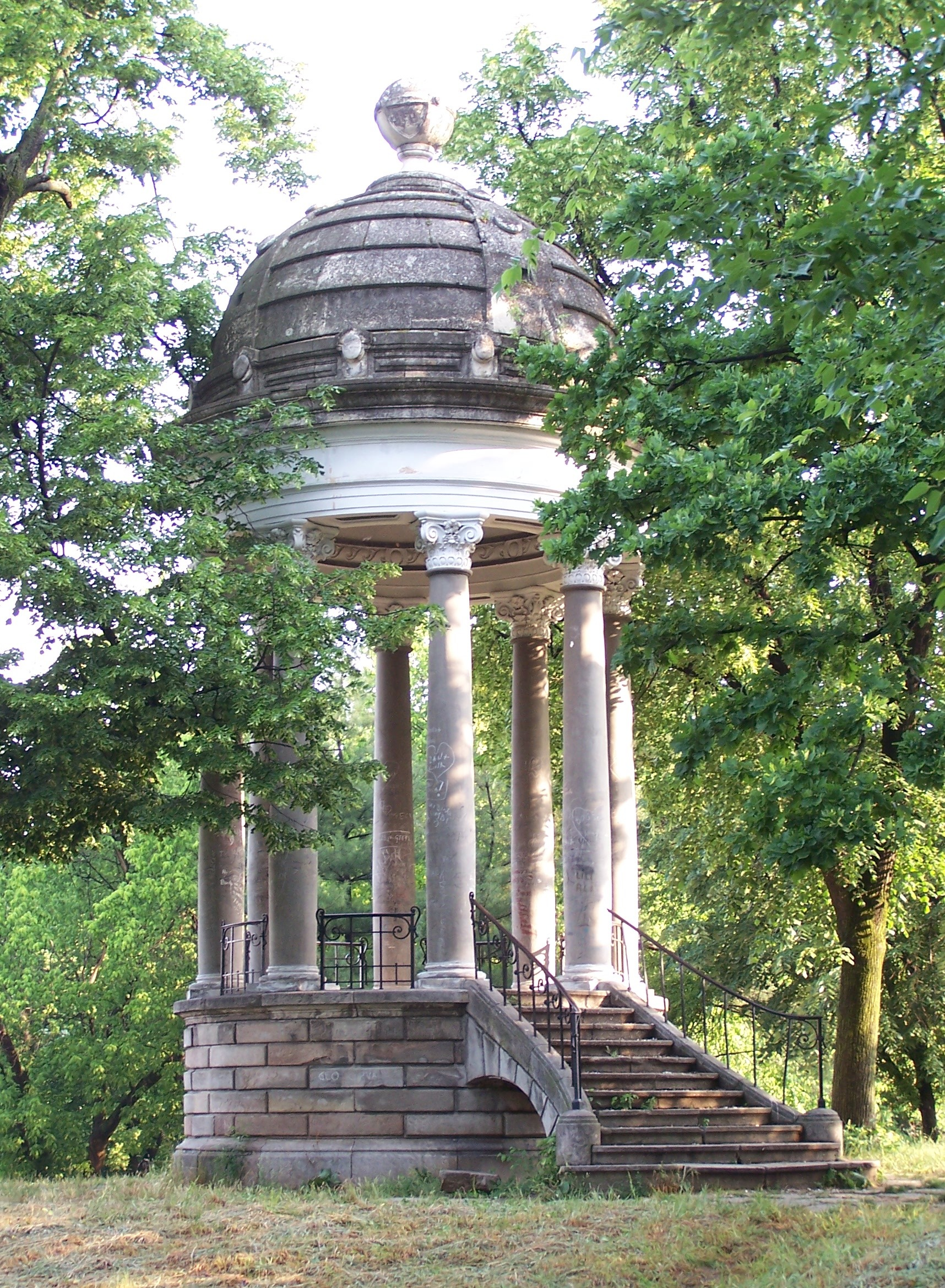
Rotonda

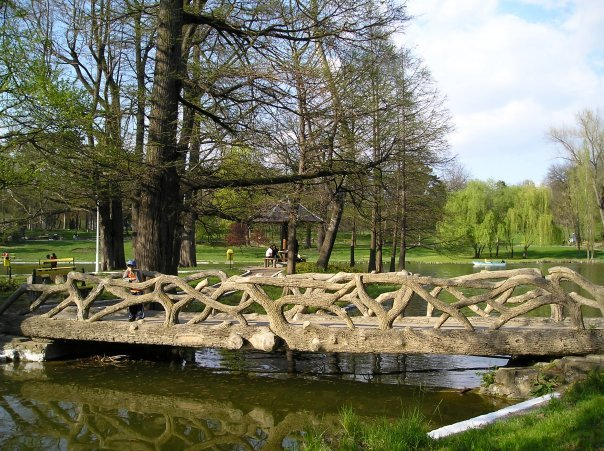
Stone Bridge

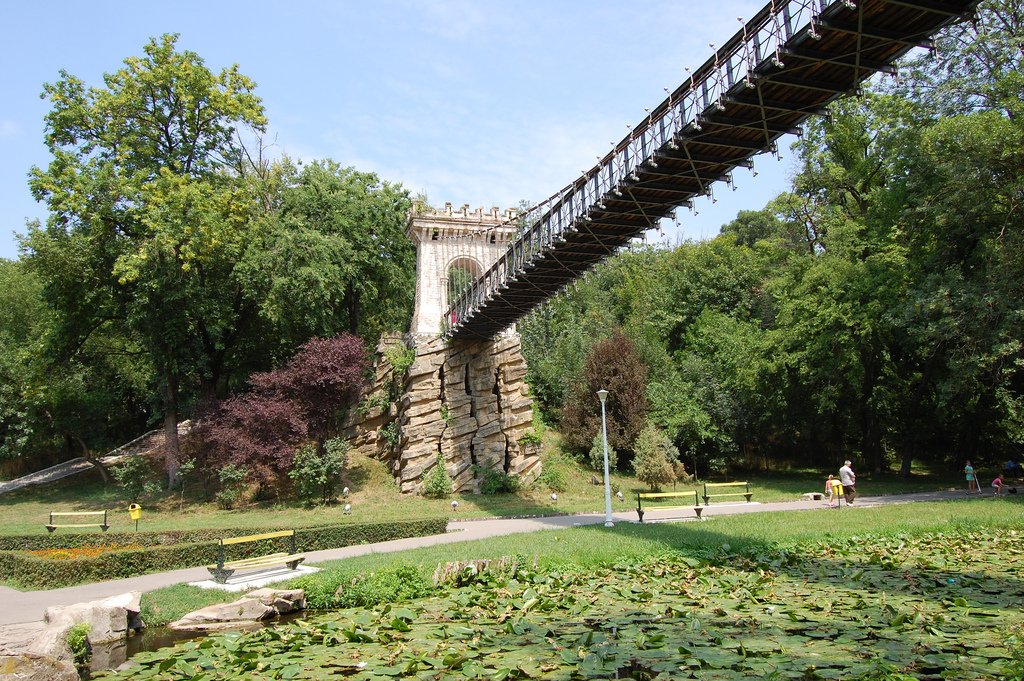
The Suspended Bridge

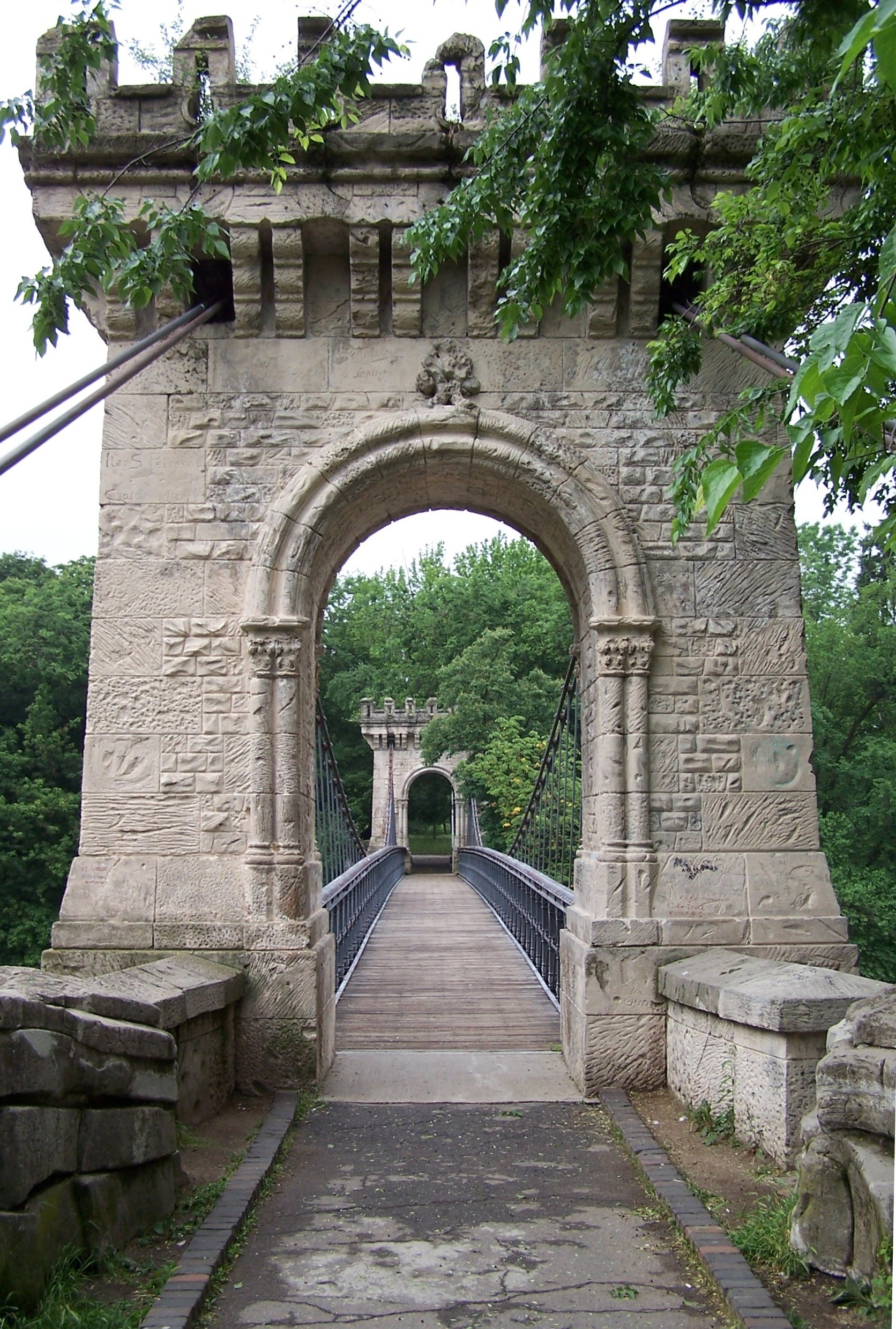
Suspended Bridge Entrance

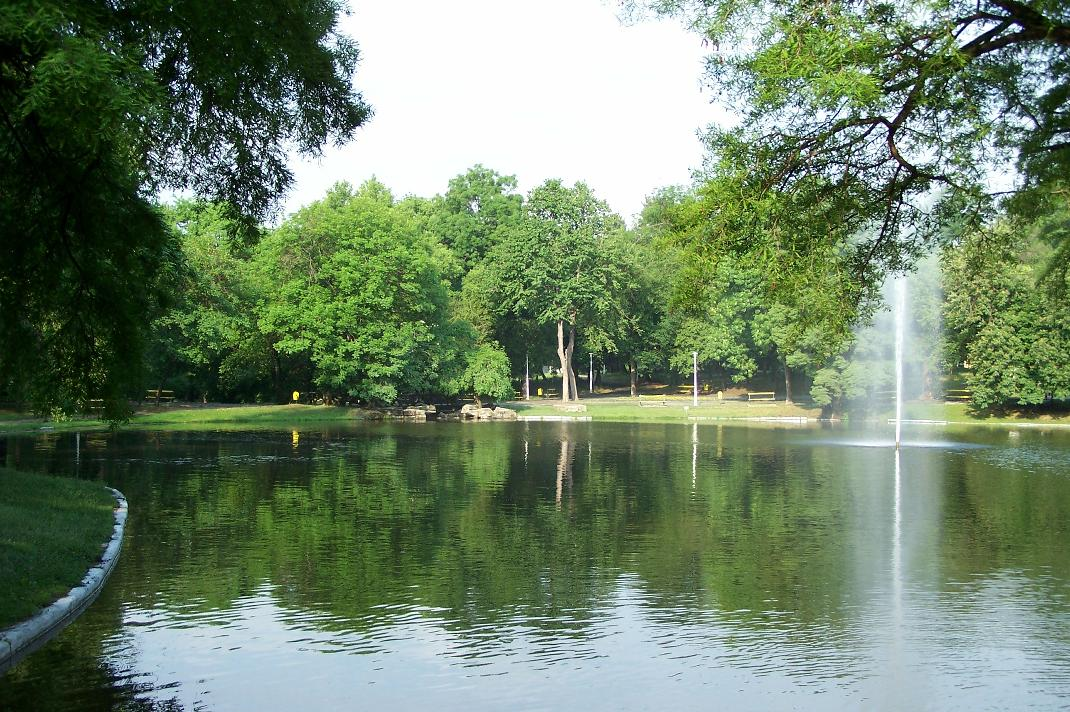
Lake Fountain
