= Ciortești =

- Commune
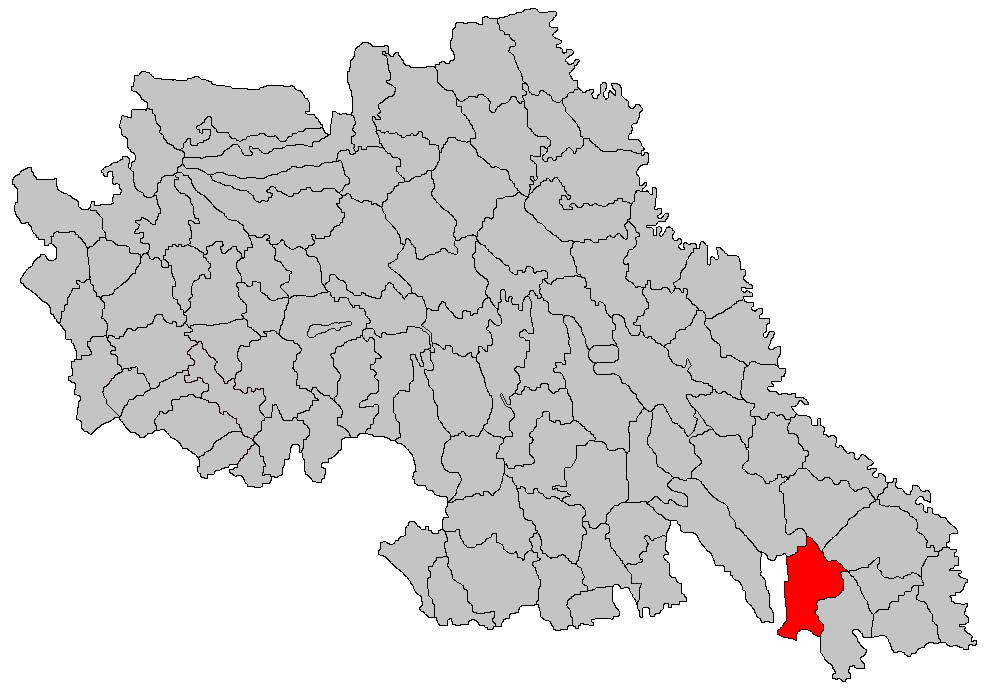
- Location in Iași County

- Location in Romania
- Coordinates: 46°54′N 27°50′E
- Country: Romania
- County: Iași
- Subdivisions: Ciortești, Coropceni, Deleni, Rotăria, Șerbești

Government
  - Mayor (2024–2028): Alina Apostol (PNL)
- Area: 64.7 km^{2} (25.0 sq mi)
- Elevation: 238 m (781 ft)
- Population (2021-12-01): 3,551
  - Density: 55/km^{2} (140/sq mi)
- Time zone: EET/EEST (UTC+2/+3)
- Postal code: 707075
- Area code: +40 x32
- Vehicle reg.: IS
- Website: www.primariaciortesti.ro

Ciortești is a commune in Iași County, Western Moldavia, Romania. It is composed of five villages: Ciortești, Coropceni, Deleni, Rotăria and Șerbești.
