= Zherban =

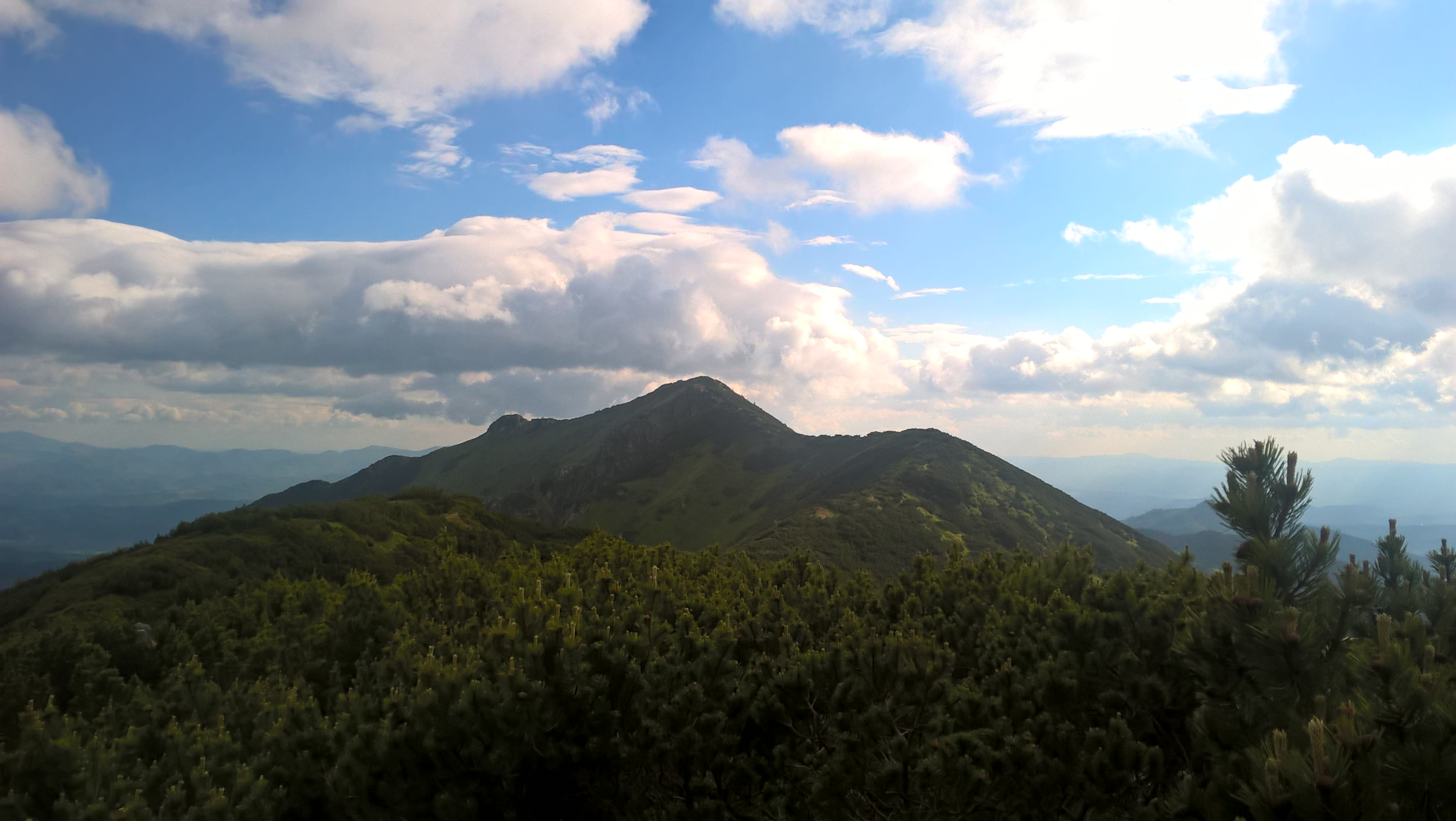
- View of Zherban

Highest point
- Elevation: 1,793.4 m (5,884 ft)
- Coordinates: 47°54′45″N 24°17′55″E

Geography
- Location within Ukraine
- Location: Ukraine
- Country: Ukraine
- Parent range: Maramureș Massif (Ukrainian Carpathians)

The Zherban (Ukrainian: Жербан; Romanian: Șerban) is a peak located in the Maramureș Mountains (Hutsul Alps). It is located in the Rakhiv Raion of the Zakarpattia Oblast, on the border of Ukraine with Romania. It has a height of 1,793.4-metre (5,884 ft) above sea level.
