= Șerbu =

Șerbu is a Romanian surname that may refer to:

- Gheorghe Vergil Șerbu (born 1949), Romanian politician and member of the European Parliament
- Ieronim Șerbu (1911–1972), Romanian prose writer
- Mark Serbu, founder of Serbu Firearms, American manufacturer of firearms
