= Șerban Iliescu =

Romanian journalist and linguist

- Born: Șerban Iliescu; March 1956
- Died: March 18, 2016 (aged 60)
- Education: University of Bucharest
- Occupations: Linguist; journalist; teacher; radio producer
- Employer: Radio România Actualități

Șerban Iliescu (March 1956 – March 18, 2016) was a Romanian linguist and journalist who worked for the national broadcasting station Radio România Actualități.

== Biography ==
In 1981, Șerban Iliescu graduated from the Faculty of Foreign Languages and Literatures, English-French department, within the University of Bucharest. Before working in the radio field, he was a French teacher and translator. In 1990, he became one of the first employees of Radio Romania after the 1989 revolution, being first a news presenter and, since 1993, producer of the sections "Radio Guide to Correct Expression" and "The Romanian Language Minute", which were broadcast for twenty-three years on every working day of the week.

In 2003, he was awarded by the National Audiovisual Council.
