= Craiova =

City in Dolj County, Romania

- County seat and Municipality
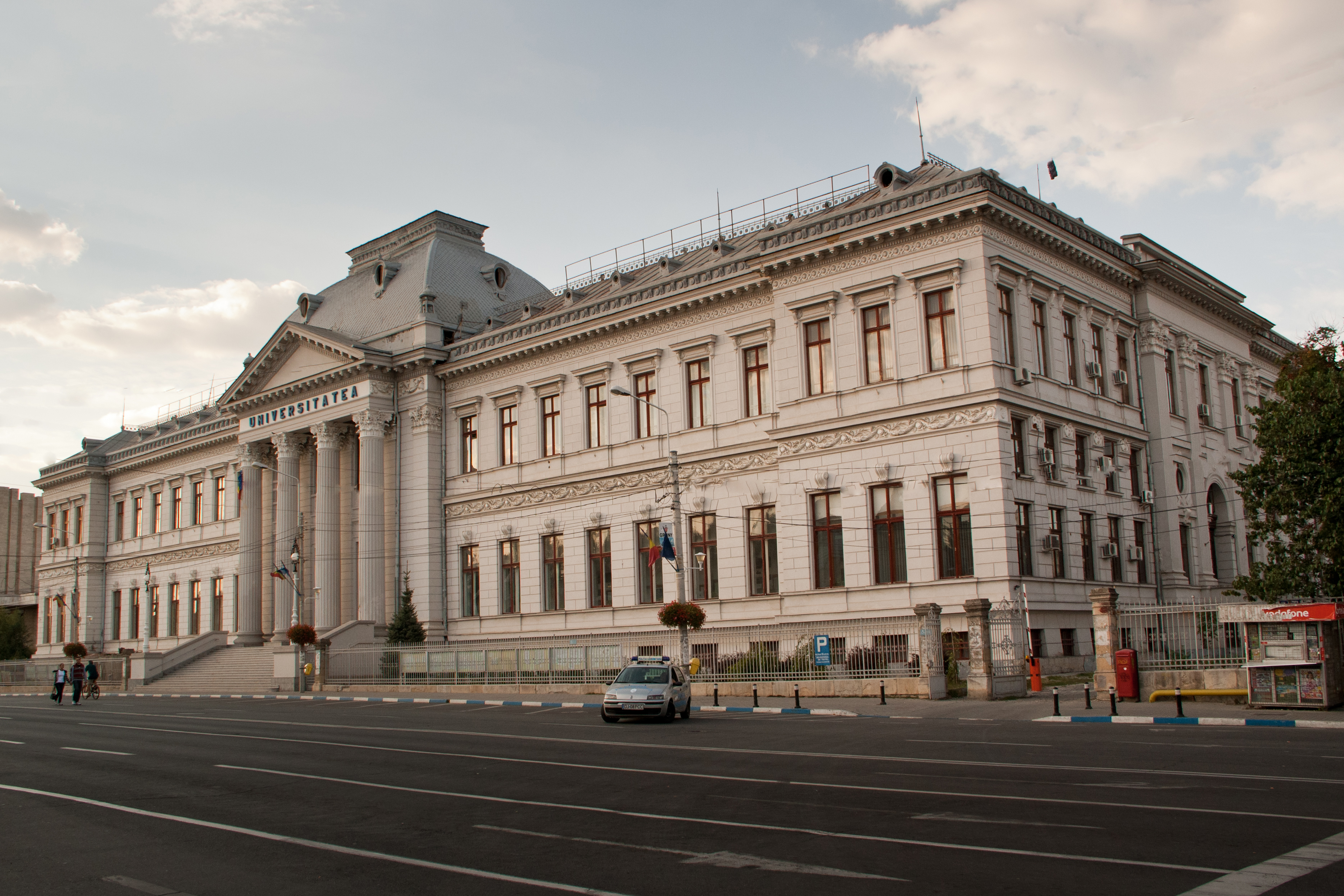
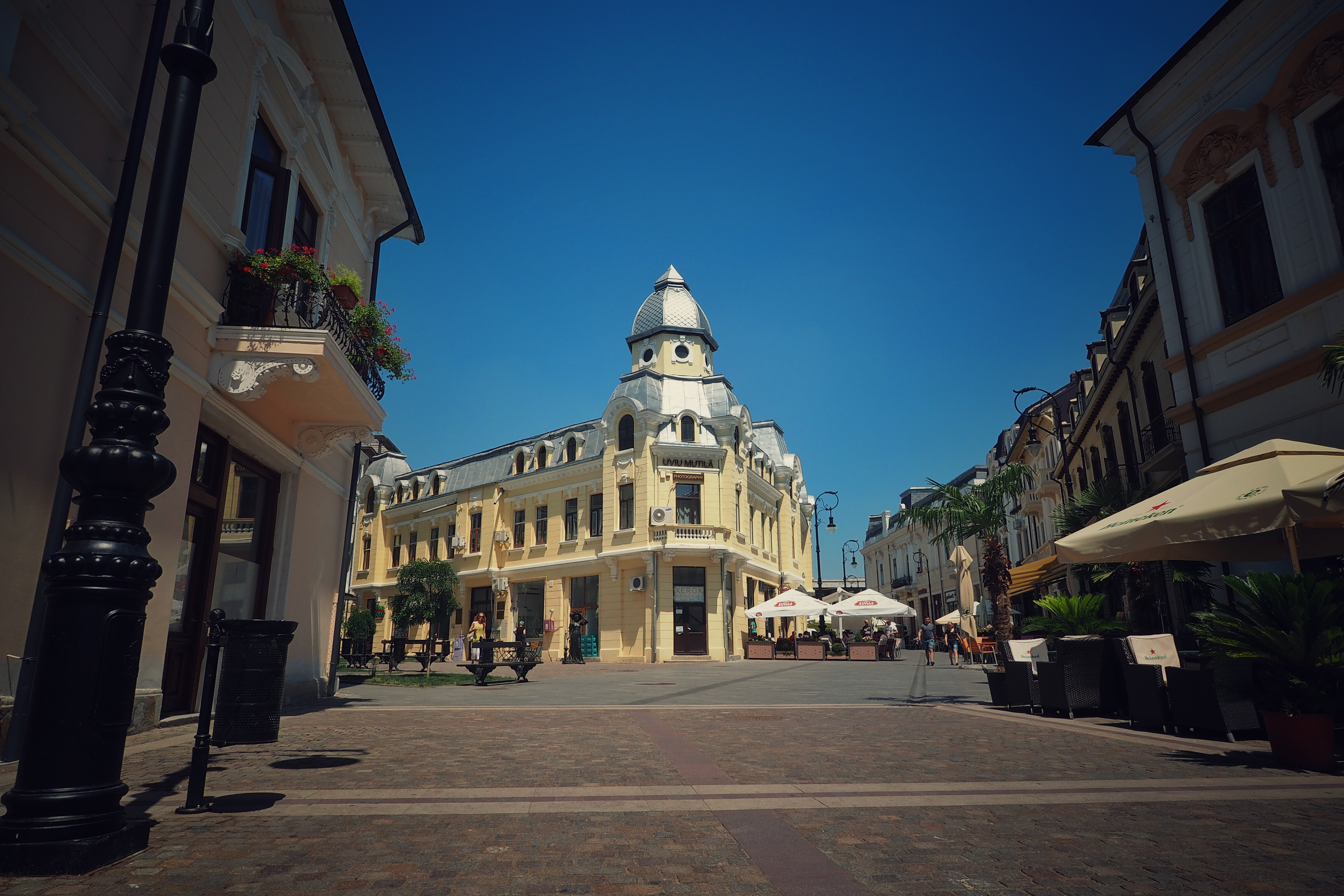
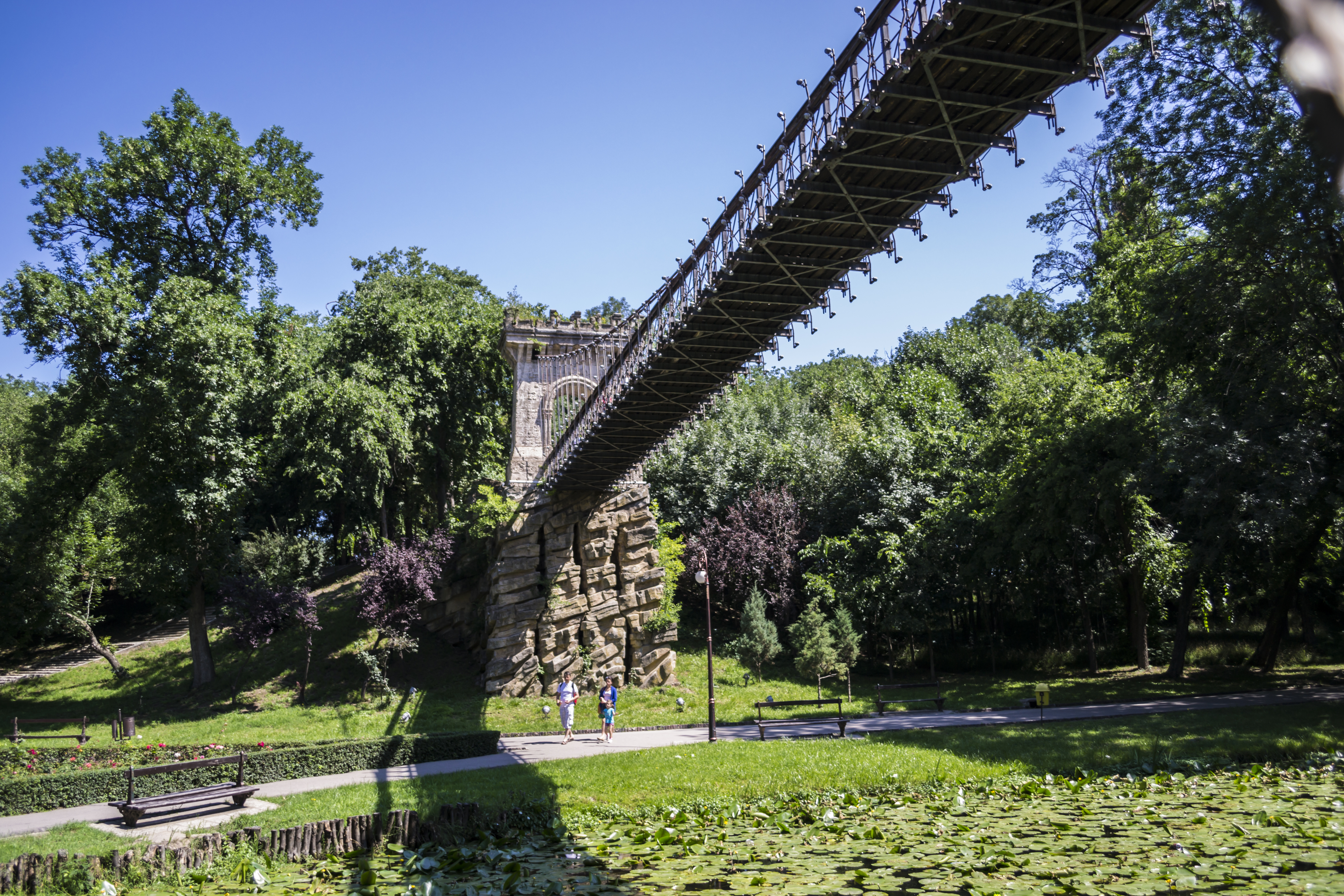
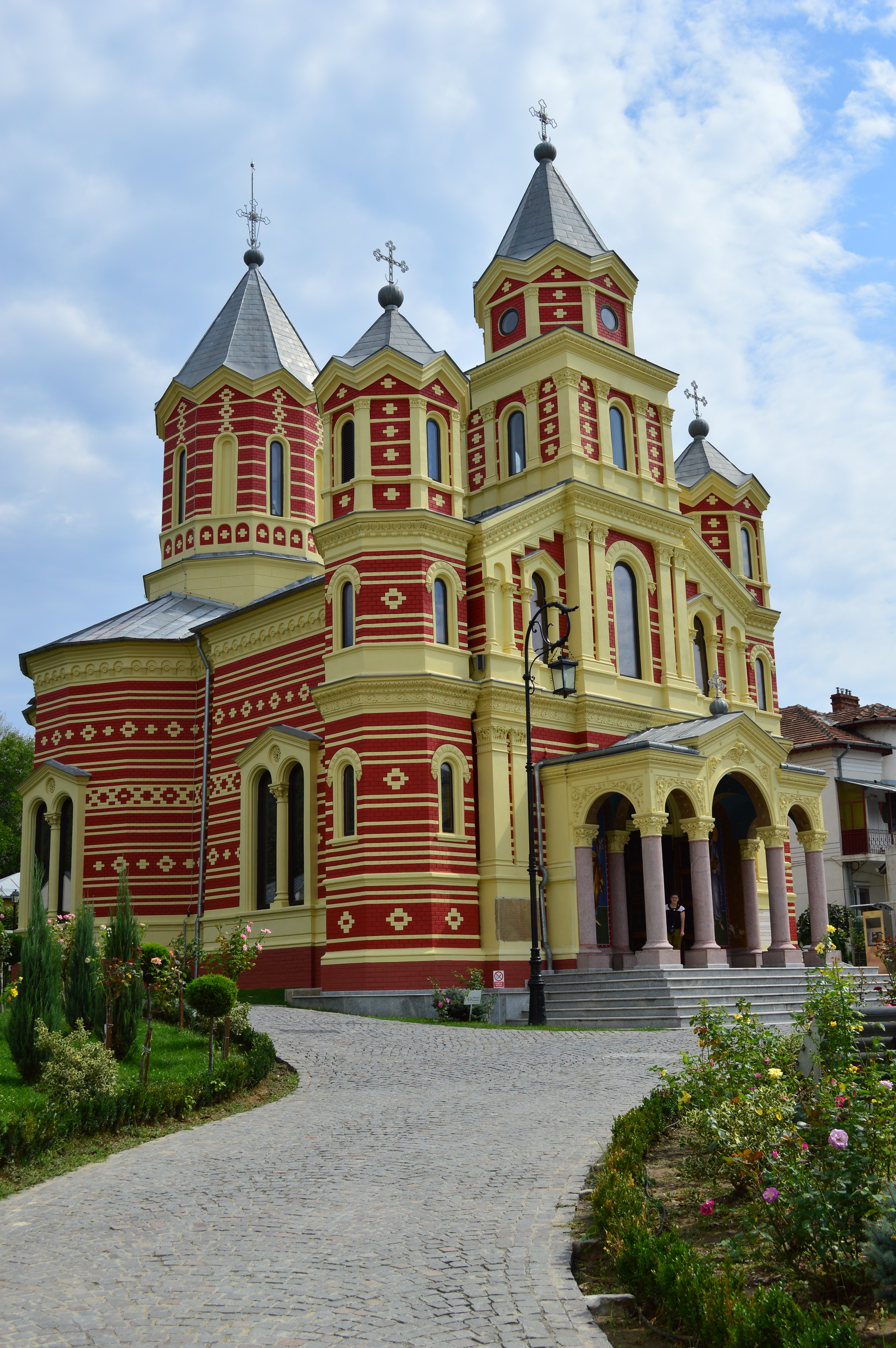
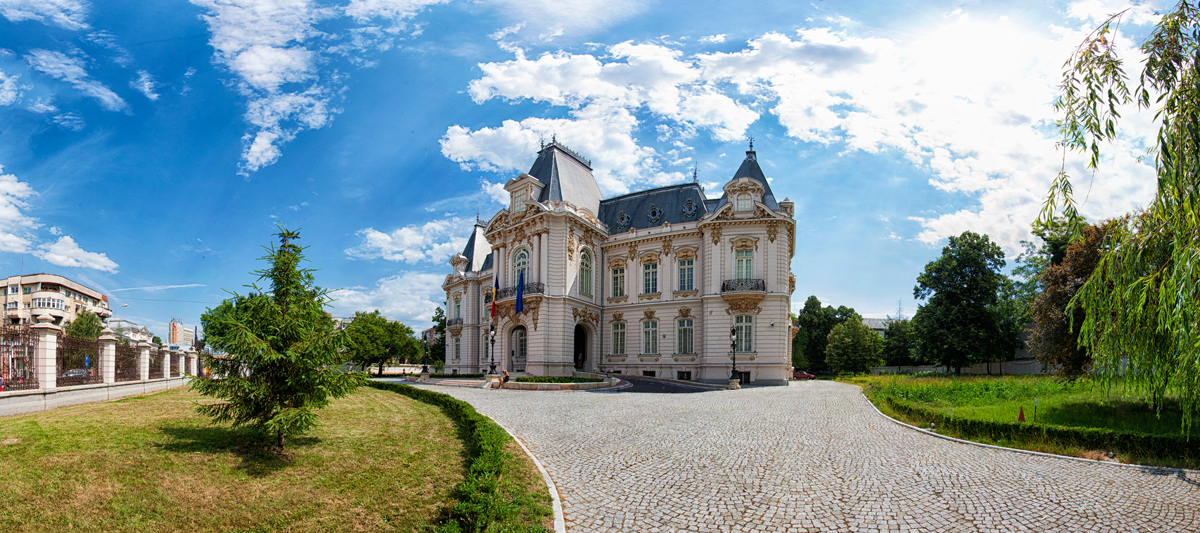
- The Prefecture University of Craiova Old Town Romanescu Park Mântuleasa church Craiova Art Museum

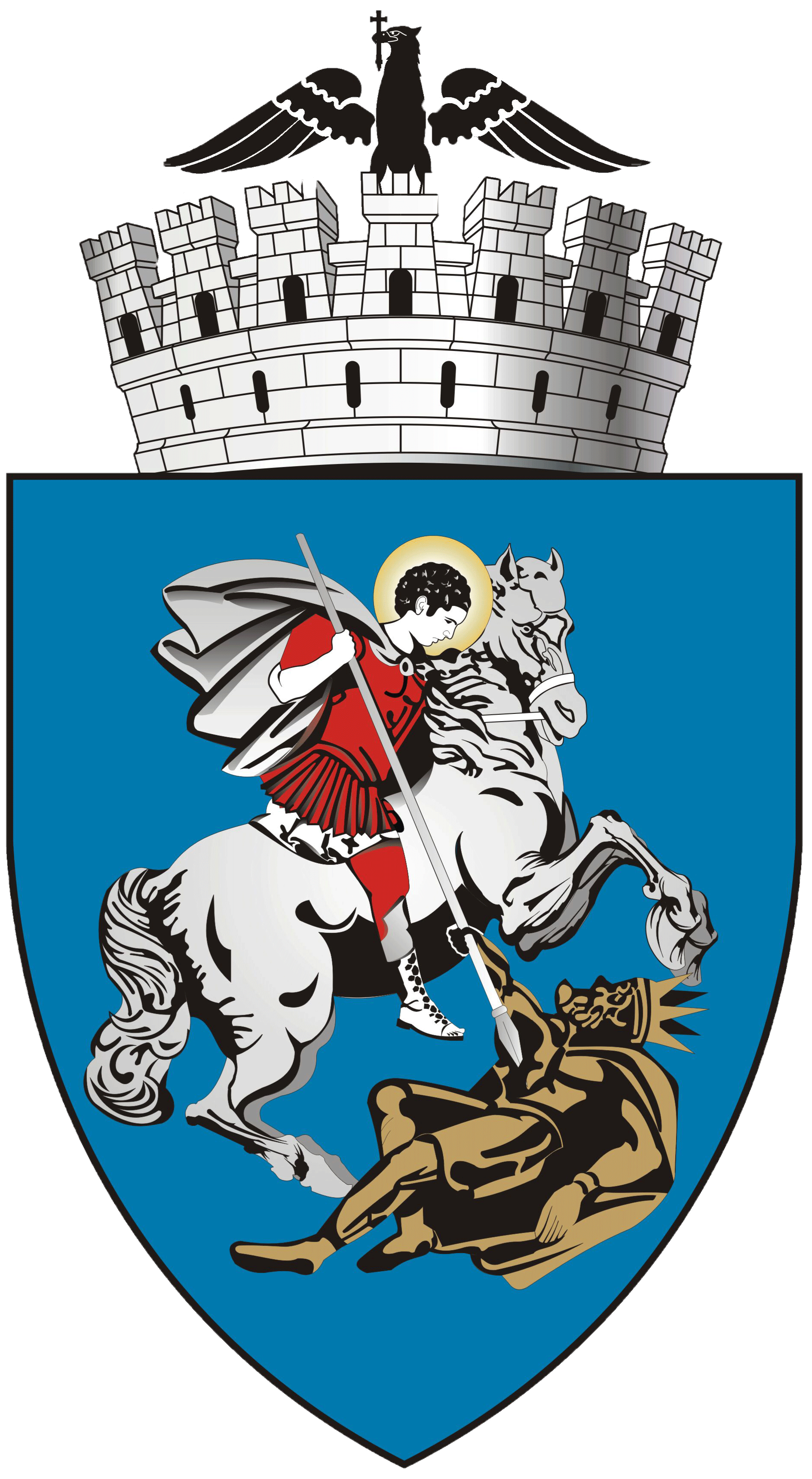
- Coat of arms
- Nickname: Bans' Citadel (Romanian: Cetatea Băniei)
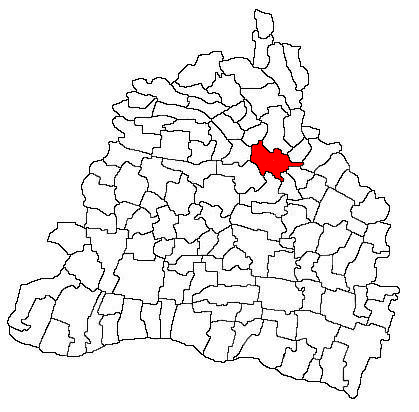
- Location in Dolj County

- Location within Romania
- Coordinates: 44°20′N 23°49′E
- Country: Romania
- County: Dolj County
- Status: County capital

Government
  - Mayor (2024–2028): Lia Olguța Vasilescu (PSD)

Area
  - County seat and Municipality: 81.41 km^{2} (31.43 sq mi)
  - Metro: 1,498.6 km^{2} (578.6 sq mi)
- Elevation: 100 m (330 ft)

Population (2021 census)
  - County seat and Municipality: 234,140
  - Density: 2,877/km^{2} (7,450/sq mi)
  - Metro: 356,544
- Demonym(s): craiovean, craioveancă (ro)
- Time zone: UTC+2 (EET)
  - Summer (DST): UTC+3 (EEST)
- Postal code: 200xxx
- Area code: (+40) 251
- Vehicle registration: DJ
- Website: www.primariacraiova.ro

Craiova (/krə.ˈjoʊ.və/, also US: /kraɪ.ˈoʊ.və, krɑː.ˈjɔː.vɑː, krɑː.ˈjoʊ.vɑː/, Romanian: [kraˈjova]) is the largest city in southwestern Romania, the seventh largest city in the country and the capital of Dolj County, situated near the east bank of the river Jiu in central Oltenia.

It is a longstanding political center, and is located at approximately equal distances from the Southern Carpathians (north) and the River Danube (south). Craiova is the chief commercial city west of Bucharest and the most important city of Oltenia. The city prospered as a regional trading centre despite an earthquake in 1790, a plague in 1795, and a Turkish assault in 1802 during which it was burned.

Eight villages are administered by the city: Făcăi, Mofleni, Popoveni, Șimnicu de Jos, Cernele, Cernelele de Sus, Izvoru Rece, and Rovine. The last four were a separate commune called Cernele until 1996, when they were merged into the city.

== Etymology and names ==
There are two possible etymologies for Craiova: Old Slavonic kral ("king"), which has been borrowed in Romania as crai, and Slavonic krajina ("border" or "edge"). Since no source prior to 1475 mentions the city, it is impossible to tell which of the two words is the real etymology.

In Hungarian, the town is either referred to as Királyi, or as Krajova. The German name of the city is Krajowa.

== History ==
Historical affiliations

Wallachia 1330–1718
Habsburg Monarchy 1718–1739
Wallachia 1739–1859
United Principalities of Moldavia and Wallachia 1859–1862
Romanian United Principalities 1862–1866
Romania 1866–present

Craiova, which occupied the site of the Dacian and Roman city Pelendava, was formerly the capital of Oltenia. Its ancient bans, the highest ranking boyars of the Wallachian state, were initially those of the Craiovești family. The bans had the right of minting coins stamped with their own effigies – the origin of the Romanian word ban as used for coins.

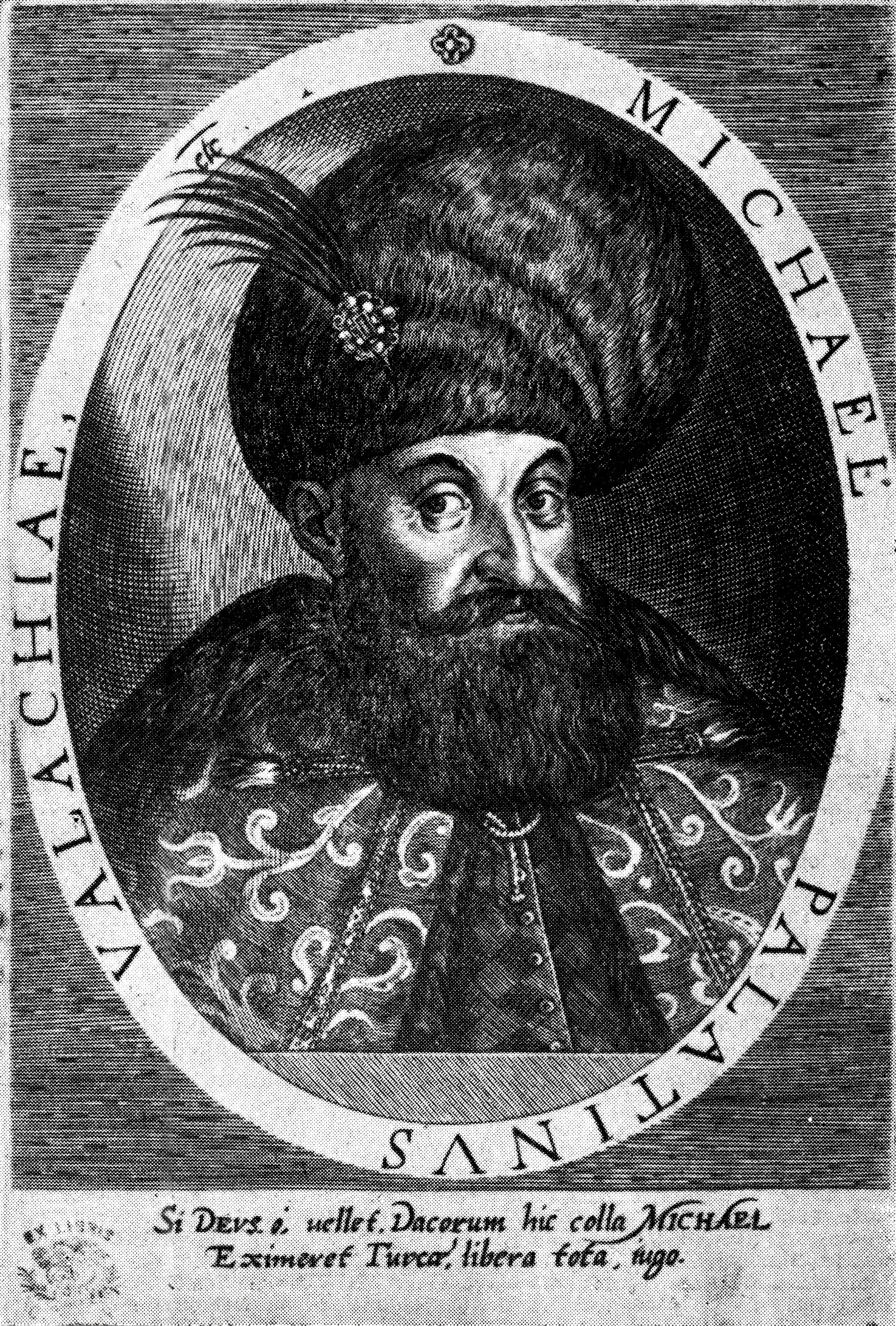
Michael the Brave

The economic power of the Craiovești family at the end of the 16th century was about 100 villages (182 financial goods). This power gave them a statute of political autonomy so big, that the hospodars ruling at that time were not able to keep in power without an alliance with this powerful dynasty. From the Craiovești family there were chosen a lot of hospodars to rule the country: Neagoe Basarab, Radu de la Afumați, Radu Șerban (1602–1611), Matei Basarab, Constantin Șerban, Șerban Cantacuzino, and Constantin Brâncoveanu.

In 1395, Craiova was probably the scene of a victory won by the Wallachian Prince Mircea I of Wallachia over Bayezid I, Sultan of the Ottomans (see Battle of Rovine).

Frequently referred to as "a city" after the first half of the 16th century, the Craiova area was always regarded as an important economic region of Wallachia and Romania at large. During the 1718–1739 Habsburg occupation of Oltenia (see Banat of Craiova), Craiova's status declined due to economic pressures and increased centralism, partly leading to an increase in hajduk actions, in parallel with protests of Craiovan boyars. In 1761, under Prince Constantine Mavrocordatos, the bans relocated to Bucharest, leaving behind kaymakams to represent them in Craiova.

Under Prince Emanuel Giani Ruset, Wallachia's seat was moved to Craiova (1770–1771), viewed as a place of refuge during the Russo-Turkish War of 1768–1774. A large part of the city was burned down by the rebel pasha Osman Pazvantoğlu in 1800.

During the Wallachian uprising of 1821, inhabitants of the present-day Dolj County joined Tudor Vladimirescu's Pandurs in great numbers, contributing to the expedition on Bucharest. During the first two decades of the 19th century, Craiova witnessed economic prosperity, centered on handicraft trades and public services. During Imperial Russian occupation and the early stages of Organic Statute rules (1828–1834), the city increased its economic output; in 1832 there were 595 shops, 197 of which were made barracks and 398 were houses built of brick. At the time, Craiova exported wheat, furs, leather, live animals and other products into the Austrian and Ottoman Empires.

Costache Romanescu, a citizen of Craiova, was among the leaders of the Provisional Government during the 1848 Wallachian revolution. Wallachia's last two rulers, Gheorghe Bibescu and Barbu Dimitrie Știrbei, came from an important boyar family residing in Craiova – the Bibescu family.

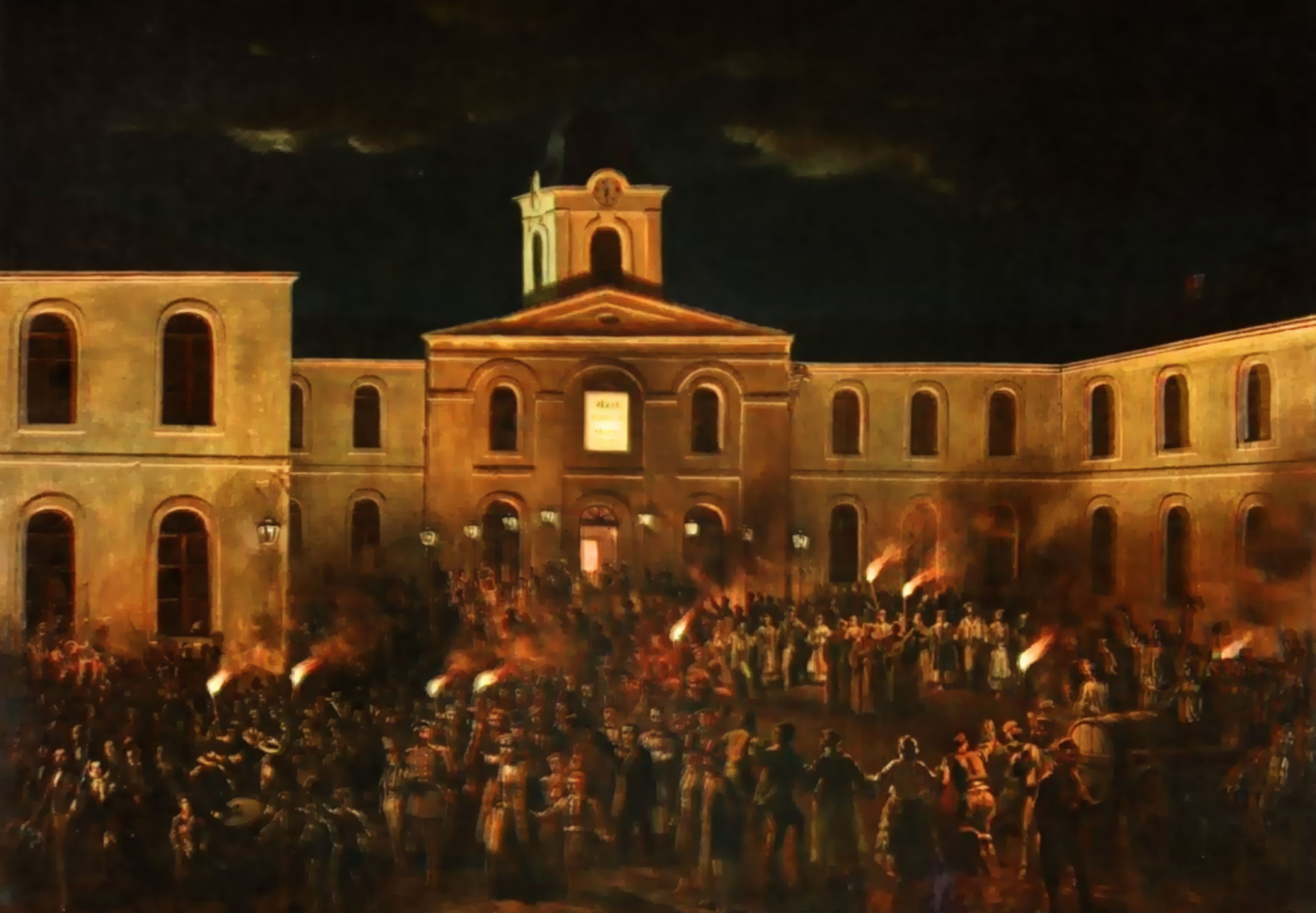
Hora Unirii at Craiova, 1857, by Theodor Aman

Around 1860, there were 4,633 buildings in Craiova, which were 3,220 houses, 26 churches, 11 schools and 60 factories and workshops. In all, the city also housed about 90 industrial establishments, of which 12 were mills, 3 breweries, 2 gas and oil factories, 4 tanning yards and 2 printing presses; 57% of the total number of craftsmen of Dolj County lived in Craiova (1,088 craftsmen, 687 journeymen and 485 apprentices).

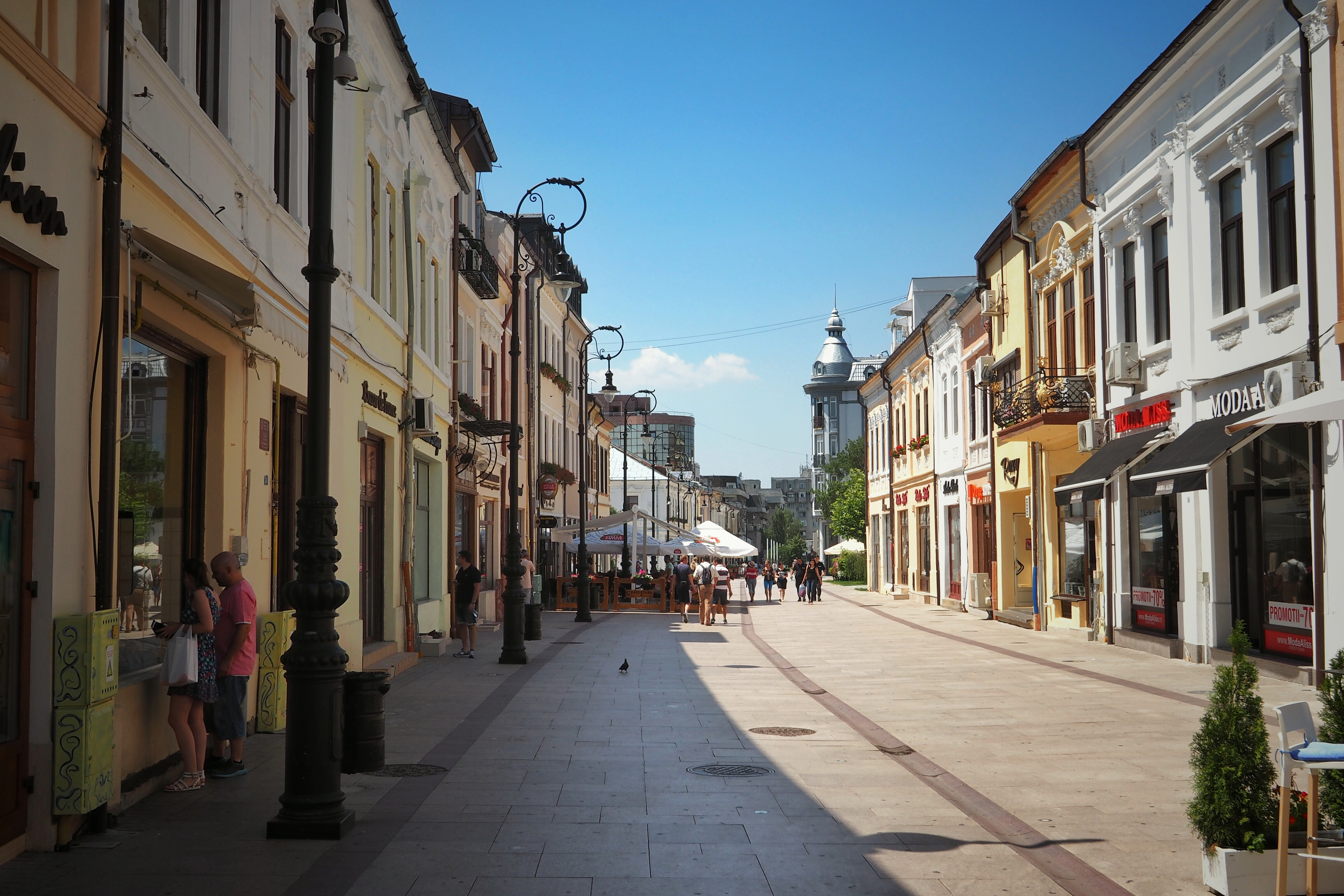
Lipscani Street in Craiova

The period following the Independence War was a time of economic and cultural progress. As a result, at the end of the 19th century, the city of Craiova, with its 40,000 inhabitants, had developed small factories (producing chemicals, farming utilities, and construction materials) and textile factories. On October 26, 1896, the Craiova power station entered service (with AEG equipment working at 310 CP, supplying 365 streetlights on 39 streets, forming a 30 km-long network); Craiova was the first city in the country to be supplied with electric power by internal combustion engines.

In 1900, Craiova had 43.1% of the industrial units of Oltenia; these numbered 924 industrial companies (including 20 large industrial establishments, employing 1,078 workers). The number of large industrial establishments rose to 40 by 1925. Banking also developed at the beginning of the 20th century (when 6 banks and 2 bureaux de change were already operating).

In the interwar period, Craiova, as the centre of an agricultural region, experienced little further industrialization; the number of industrial workers remained comparatively small. In 1939, Craiova had 7 industrial units with over 100 workers: the clothing industry companies Oltenia and Scrisul Românesc were well-known all over the country and abroad. The Treaty of Craiova was signed here on 7 September 1940; under its terms, Romania ceded to Bulgaria the territory of Southern Dobruja, which Romania had gained after the 1913 Second Balkan War.

In the early 1960s, under the Communist regime, the city became a centre for the automotive and engine building industries, as well as for aerospace manufacturing, chemical industry, food industry, construction, electrical engineering, mining and the electrical power industry. The construction of housing estates also begins at this time, with Brazda lui Novac being one of the first in 1967–1968, followed by Siloz-Valea Roșie in the same years. Later on in the 1980s the Craiovița Nouă, Rovine, 1 Mai, Sărari and Lăpuș-Argeș housing estates are built.

After the 1989 Revolution brought the re-establishment of a free market and decentralisation in overall management, several industries became subject to privatisation, while the market opened itself to private initiatives. Industry, although affected by economic changes, remains an important branch, representing circa 70% of Craiova's output.

== Geography ==
=== Climate ===
Under the Köppen climate classification, Craiova has a humid continental climate (Dfa), bordering on a humid subtropical climate (Köppen: Cfa). This results in a combination of occasional cold winters, but too mild of a climate to contain permanent snow cover, along with long and hot summers.

Annually, Craiova experiences 64 days with fog, more frequently in winter than other seasons. The city also experiences 34 days per year with thunder, and 1 day with hail.

Climate data for Craiova (1991–2020, extremes since 1931) (Note: Snowfall and Dew Point are for 1961-1990 period)
Month	Jan	Feb	Mar	Apr	May	Jun	Jul	Aug	Sep	Oct	Nov	Dec	Year
Record high °C (°F)	19.8 (67.6)	21.7 (71.1)	28.4 (83.1)	31.8 (89.2)	35.3 (95.5)	39.2 (102.6)	41.3 (106.3)	40.8 (105.4)	40.1 (104.2)	34.4 (93.9)	25.9 (78.6)	18.4 (65.1)	41.3 (106.3)
Mean daily maximum °C (°F)	3.0 (37.4)	6.2 (43.2)	12.1 (53.8)	18.2 (64.8)	23.6 (74.5)	27.8 (82.0)	30.2 (86.4)	30.3 (86.5)	24.7 (76.5)	17.6 (63.7)	9.9 (49.8)	3.9 (39.0)	17.3 (63.1)
Daily mean °C (°F)	−0.9 (30.4)	1.3 (34.3)	6.2 (43.2)	12.0 (53.6)	17.2 (63.0)	21.3 (70.3)	23.3 (73.9)	23.1 (73.6)	17.8 (64.0)	11.7 (53.1)	5.8 (42.4)	0.3 (32.5)	11.6 (52.9)
Mean daily minimum °C (°F)	−4.1 (24.6)	−2.3 (27.9)	1.7 (35.1)	6.7 (44.1)	11.4 (52.5)	15.1 (59.2)	16.9 (62.4)	16.9 (62.4)	12.4 (54.3)	7.4 (45.3)	2.6 (36.7)	−2.5 (27.5)	6.9 (44.3)
Record low °C (°F)	−30.5 (−22.9)	−27.4 (−17.3)	−19.4 (−2.9)	−4.4 (24.1)	−2.0 (28.4)	4.4 (39.9)	7.5 (45.5)	6.4 (43.5)	−2.0 (28.4)	−6.0 (21.2)	−14.8 (5.4)	−24.1 (−11.4)	−30.5 (−22.9)
Average precipitation mm (inches)	42.5 (1.67)	33.9 (1.33)	45.9 (1.81)	48.8 (1.92)	67.6 (2.66)	74.5 (2.93)	73.3 (2.89)	47.5 (1.87)	52.5 (2.07)	51.9 (2.04)	48.4 (1.91)	50.2 (1.98)	637 (25.08)
Average snowfall cm (inches)	13.7 (5.4)	11.7 (4.6)	6.6 (2.6)	2.5 (1.0)	0.0 (0.0)	0.0 (0.0)	0.0 (0.0)	0.0 (0.0)	0.0 (0.0)	2.5 (1.0)	7.9 (3.1)	10.2 (4.0)	55.1 (21.7)
Average precipitation days (≥ 1.0 mm)	6.6	5.6	6.5	6.8	9.1	7.1	6.3	4.8	5.5	6.1	6.2	6.9	77.5
Average relative humidity (%)	89	87	81	75	75	75	73	72	73	80	88	91	80
Average dew point °C (°F)	−3.7 (25.3)	−2.3 (27.9)	1.6 (34.9)	6.1 (43.0)	11.1 (52.0)	14.3 (57.7)	15.6 (60.1)	15.1 (59.2)	12.0 (53.6)	7.3 (45.1)	2.8 (37.0)	−1.0 (30.2)	6.6 (43.8)
Mean monthly sunshine hours	94	125	177	210	254	276	299	291	219	159	89	75	2,268
Source 1: NOAA
Source 2: Deutscher Wetterdienst (extremes and humidity, 1973–1992), Meteomanz (extremes since 2021)

== Demographics ==
Historical population of Craiova
Year	Population	%±
1859	21,521	—
1900	45,438	111.1%
1912 census	51,404	13.1%
1930 census	63,215	22.9%
1941 census	77,051	21.9%
1948 census	84,574	9.7%
1956 census	96,897	14.5%
1966 census	148,711	53.4%
1977 census	221,261	48.7%
1992 census	303,959	37.3%
2002 census	302,601	−0.4%
2011 census	269,506	−10.9%
2021 census	234,140	−13.1%

As of 2021, 234,140 inhabitants live within the city limits, a decrease from the figure recorded in 2011, making it the 7th most populous city in Romania.

Ethnic composition (2011):

- Romanians: 241,176 (89.5%)
- Roma: 5,291 (2.0%)
- Other: 808 (0.3%)
- Data unavailable: 22,231 (8.2%)

Ethnic composition (2021):

- Romanians: 190,634 (81.4%)
- Roma: 2,639 (1.1%)
- Other: 922 (0.4%)
- Data unavailable: 39,945 (17%)

== Economy ==
First Ford Transit at Automobile Craiova

In the first two decades of the 19th century, Craiova was characterized by economic growth and the increased presence of trade, commerce, and public services. Similarly to other large urban areas, Craiova became a commercial, administrative and cultural centre.

During the Tsarist take-over (1828–1834), Craiova experienced significant economic growth. In 1832, there were 595 shops, of which "187 [were] of wood and 398 of stone wall". The city was the commercial centre of Oltenia. It exported cereal, skins, wax, animals, tallow and services to Austria and Turkey. As a consequence of the permanent high demand for exports, Craiova was the site of the first Romanian society for shares in cereal shipping on the Danube to Brăila, established in 1846.

Around 1860 in Craiova there were 4633 buildings, of which 3220 were houses, 26 churches, 11 schools, and 60 factories or workshops. There were also approximately 90 establishments with an industrial character, of which 12 were wind mills, 3 beer factories, 2 gas and oil factories, 4 tanneries, and 2 were printing houses. Statistics show that Craiova was home to 57.7% of the total number of craftsmen in Dolj County (1088 craftsmen, 687 journeymen and 485 apprentices). Towards the end of the 19th century, the city of Craiova had small factories and workshops with chemical products, agricultural machines, graphic design, tanneries, textiles, construction materials, among others. On 26 October 1896, Craiova's power plant (using AEG equipment) began operations, supplying 365 lamps on 39 streets in a 30 km (18.64 mi) network. Craiova was the first city in the country powered by electricity based on internal combustion engines.

In 1900, Craiova held 43.1% of the industrial units in Oltenia, having 924 industrial firms (of which 20 establishments belonged to heavy industry, using 1078 workers). In 1925, the number of heavy industry establishments had increased to 49, and in 1930 the number of workers was 5530. The banking industry was also present; at the beginning of the 20th century, there were 6 banks and 2 bureaux de cha

In 1939, there were only 7 industrial units with over 100 workers in Craiova: the "Oltenia" clothing factory, the "Scrisul Românesc" ("The Romanian Writing") publishing house, the "Concordia" macaroni factory, the "Barbu Druga" bread and macaroni factory, the "Semănătoarea" factory and the "Traiul" bread factory. The only branch of industry at the same level of development as other centers of the country was graphic art. The two printing houses "Ramuri" and "Scrisul Românesc" were well-known all over Romania and abroad.

Starting in the 1960s the city became a powerful industrial center; it developed industry in machinery, tools, aircraft, chemicals, food, light industry, construction materials, electronics, extraction, and energy. The Romanian Revolution of 1989 led to important changes in the economy, with the introduction of a free market and decentralization of the management of all national economic sectors. In industry, an overall drop in production capacity was noted, caused by an inability to anticipate the impact of change and the economic shocks that followed the change of system. Nevertheless, industry continues to represent the largest sector of the city's economy (70%).

== Politics ==
The Craiova Municipal Council, chosen at the 2020 local election, consisted of 27 councillors, with the following party composition:

Party	Seats	Current Council
Social Democratic Party (PSD)	10	
National Liberal Party (PNL)	9	
Save Romania Union (USR)	5	
Romanian Ecologist Party (PER)	3	

=== 2024–present ===
The city's current local council has the following multi-party political composition, based on the results of the ballots cast at the 2024 Romanian local elections:

Party	Seats	Current Council
Social Democratic Party (PSD)	14	
Alliance for the Union of Romanians (AUR)	5	
United Right Alliance (ADU)	4	
National Liberal Party (PNL)	4	

=== Craiova Group ===
The Craiova Group, inspired by the Visegrád Group, was founded on 24 April 2015 in Craiova by Romania, Bulgaria and Serbia. Greece later joined to the organization in 2017.

== Landmarks ==
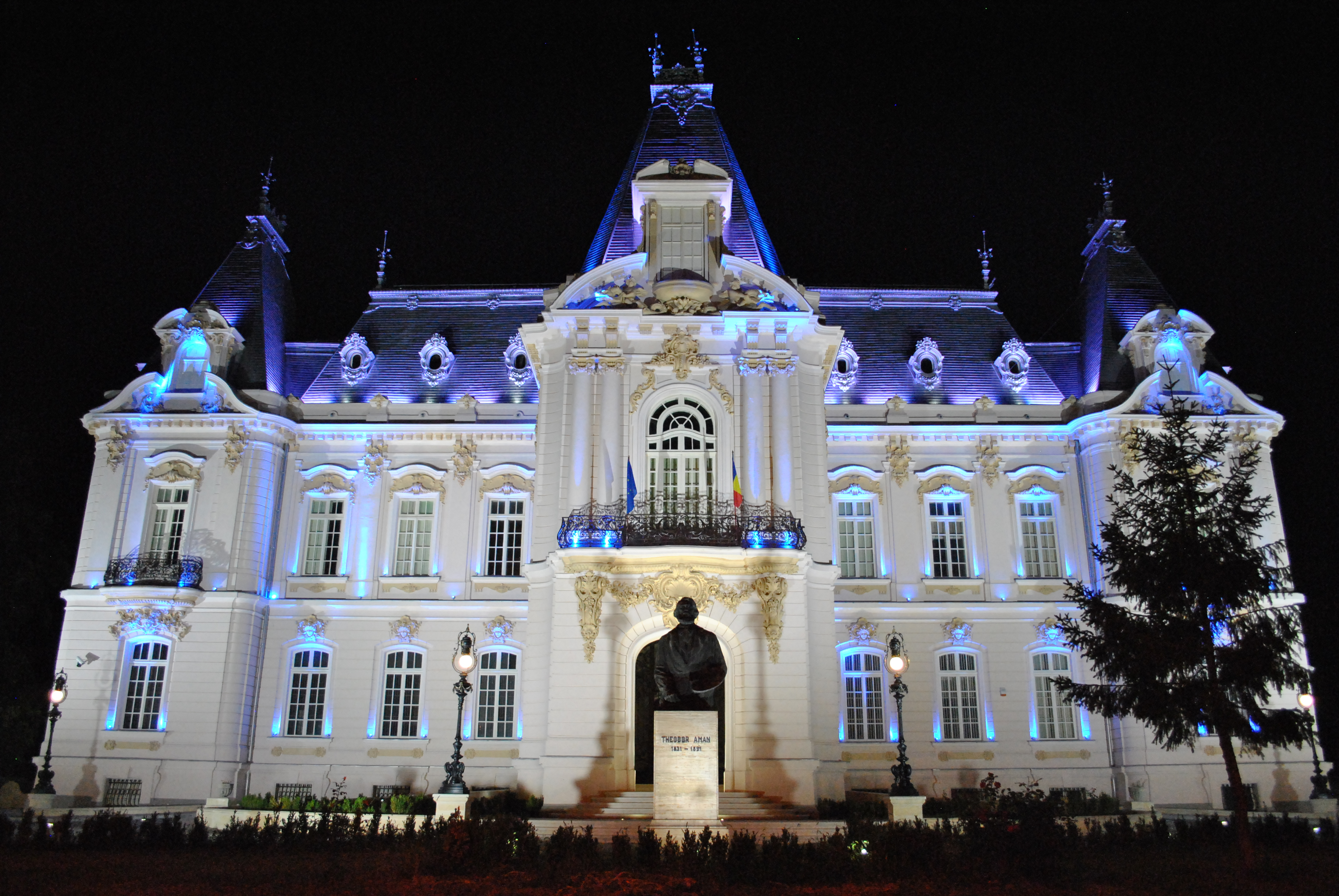
Constantin Mihail Palace, now Art Museum

- Madona Dudu Church – built between 1750 and 1756, renovated in 1844, after being destroyed by an 1831 earthquake. Murals were completed by Gheorghe Tattarescu.
- St. Demetrius Cathedral
- The Church of Coșuna Monastery – the oldest building preserved in Craiova, dating from 1483.
- Băniei House – the oldest non-religious building that exists in Craiova, dating from 1699. Today it hosts the Museum of Ethnography and Folk Art.
- Craiova Art Museum – the building that houses the museum was built in 1896, following the plans of the French architect Paul Gotereau. Its main attraction is the art gallery dedicated to Constantin Brâncuși, exhibiting six of his early sculptures (including variants of his best-known works)
- Museum of Oltenia – founded in 1915 and divided into three sections: ethnography, history and natural science. The collection is based on donations made in 1908.
- Nicolae Romanescu Park (formerly Bibescu Park) – the largest and most well-known park in Craiova. Through the initiative of Nicolae P. Romanescu, the mayor of Craiova at that time, the park was designed by French architect Émile Rendont. Plans for the park were awarded the gold medal at the 1900 World Fair; work began in 1901 and was completed in 1903.
- Botanical Garden – The garden was laid out by the botanist Alexandru Buia and was opened in 1952.
- Jiu River meadow

== Education ==
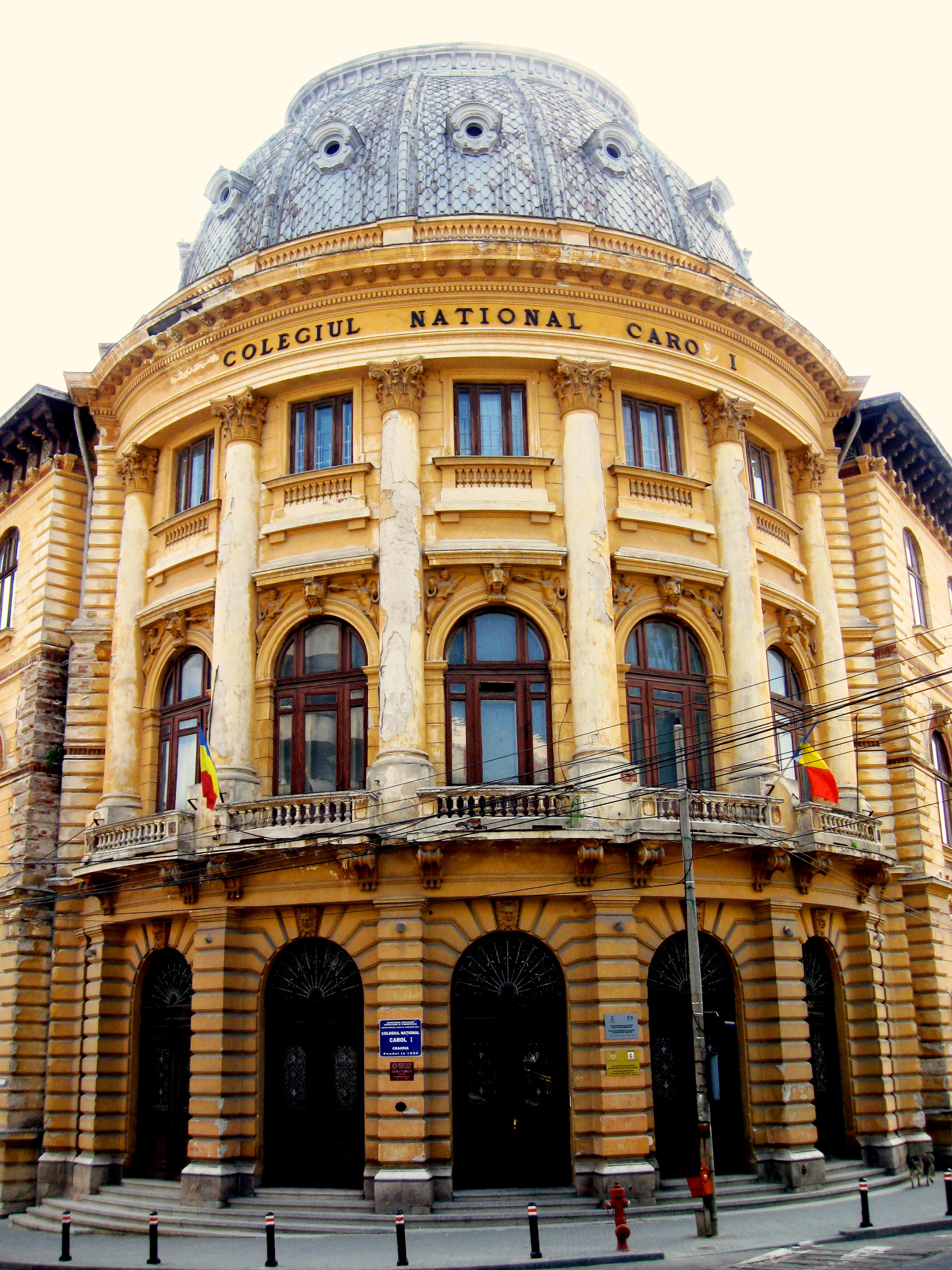
Carol I National College

The first school in Craiova was founded in 1759 by Constantin Obedeanu. In the spring of 1826 Obedeanu's school took the name Școala Naţională de Limba Română which means National School of Romanian Language. This was the second Romanian high school after Saint Sava high school in Bucharest (founded in 1818).

High schools
- Frații Buzești National College
- Carol I National College (former Nicolae Bălcescu Popular College)
- Elena Cuza National College
- Ștefan Velovan College
- Henri Coandă College
- Traian Vuia College
- Nicolae Titulescu College
- Stefan Odobleja Computer Science College
- Constantin Brâncuși Technical College of Arts and Handicrafts
- Tudor Arghezi Theoretical College
- Seventh Day Adventist Theological College
- Matei Basarab College
- George Bibescu Technological College
- UCECOM Spiru Haret College
- Marin Sorescu Art College
- Auto Transport College
- Gheorghe Chitu Economic College
- Energetic Technical College
- Charles Laugier College
- Petrache Triscu Sportive College
- Costin D. Nenițescu Technical College
- Food Industry Technical College
- Sf. Ștefan Ecological College
- Auto Technological College
- Railway Transport Industrial College

Universities

- University of Craiova
- University of Medicine and Pharmacy

== Sport ==
Ion Oblemenco Stadium

The first football teams in Craiova appeared in 1921, Craiovan Craiova and Rovine Griviţa Craiova. They merged in 1940, forming a team, FC Craiova, that won the unofficial war championship. Later, another team from the city, Universitatea Craiova, became the first Romanian football team to reach the semi-finals of a European tournament, during the UEFA Cup in 1982–83.

- CS Universitatea Craiova – football team
- FC U Craiova 1948 – football team
- SCM CSU Craiova - Divizia A is a basketball team play in Polyvalent Hall
- SCM CSU Craiova - Liga Națională is a handball team play in Polyvalent Hall
- SCM U Craiova - Divizia A1 is a volleyball team play in Polyvalent Hall

== Transportation ==
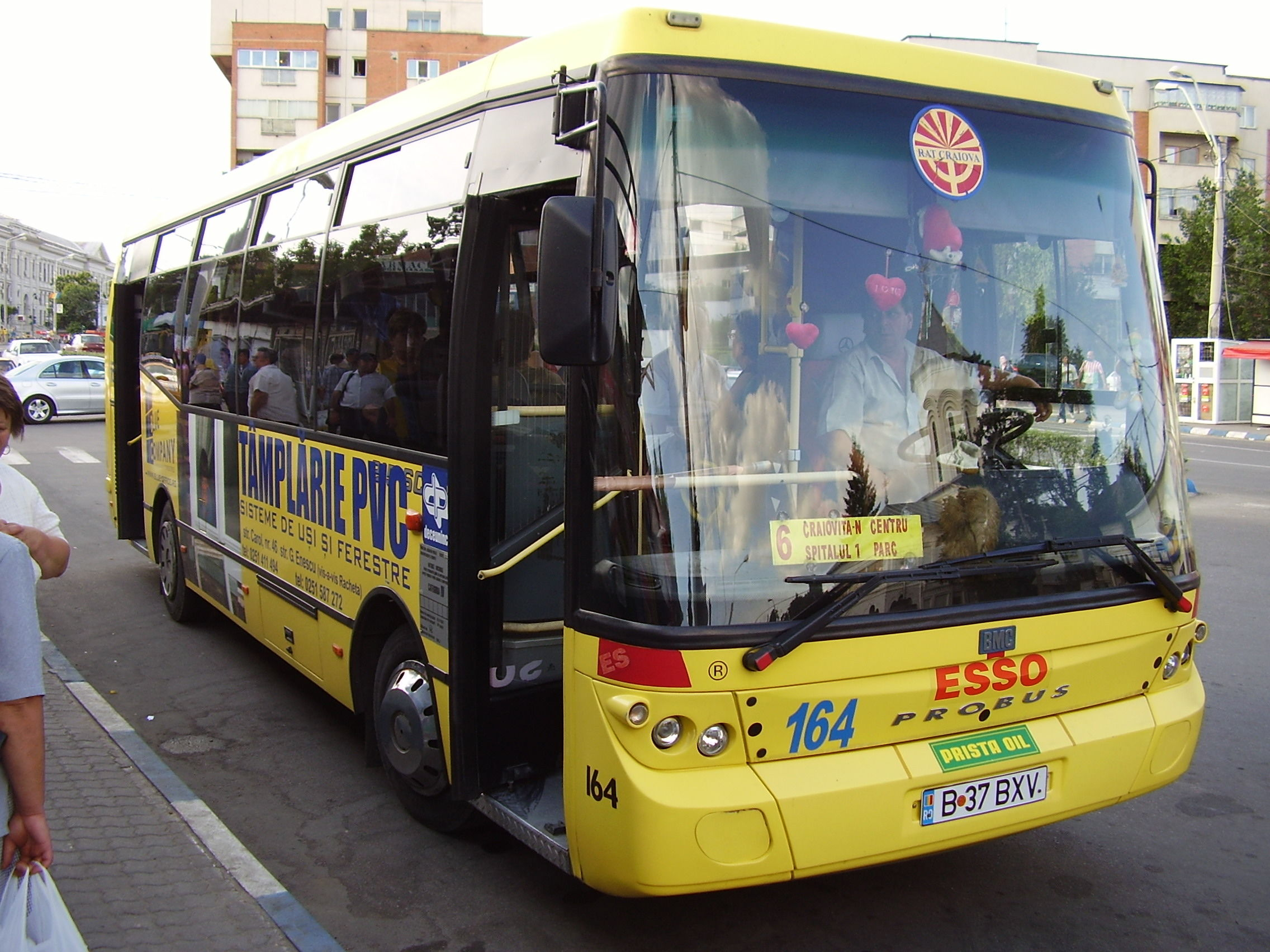
A city bus in Craiova running on route 6

Public transportation in Craiova started in September 1948 with only 2 buses, received from Bucharest. The buses connected the Craiova railway station with the Nicolae Romanescu Park. The tram was first introduced in 1987, on an 18.4 km (11.43 mi) double-track line, as a result of the state's intention of keeping energy consumption low. The public transport in Craiova today consists of 3 tram lines and 17 bus lines. It is operated by the RAT Craiova, a corporation run by City Hall. There are 190 buses and 35 trams serving the city today.

Craiova is also a major railway centre and is connected to all other major Romanian cities, as well as local destinations, through the national Căile Ferate Române network.

There are daily trains with service from Craiova to: Bucharest (3 hours), Brașov (6 – 8 hours - via connecting service), Cluj-Napoca (8 – 10 hours - connecting service), Sibiu (4 – 7 hours), Sighișoara (8 – 11 hours - connecting service), Timișoara ( 5 hours)

The city is served by Craiova Airport, which has recently been modernised.

== Twin towns – Sister cities ==
Kuopio, Finland; Nanterre, France; Lyon, France	Muntinlupa, Philippines; Shiyan, China; Skopje, North Macedonia	Vratsa, Bulgaria; Uppsala, Sweden; Patras, Greece

== Gallery ==
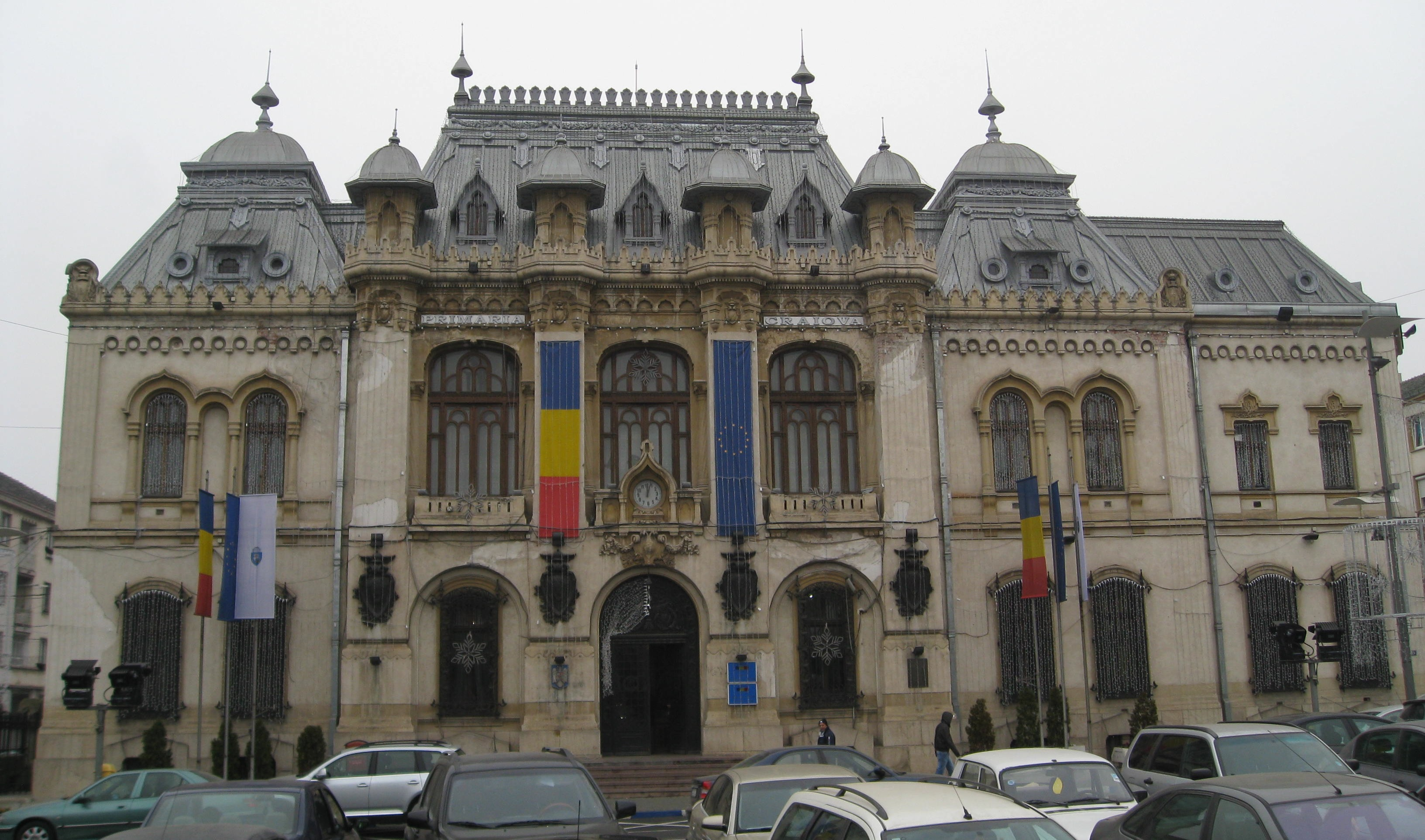
Town Hall

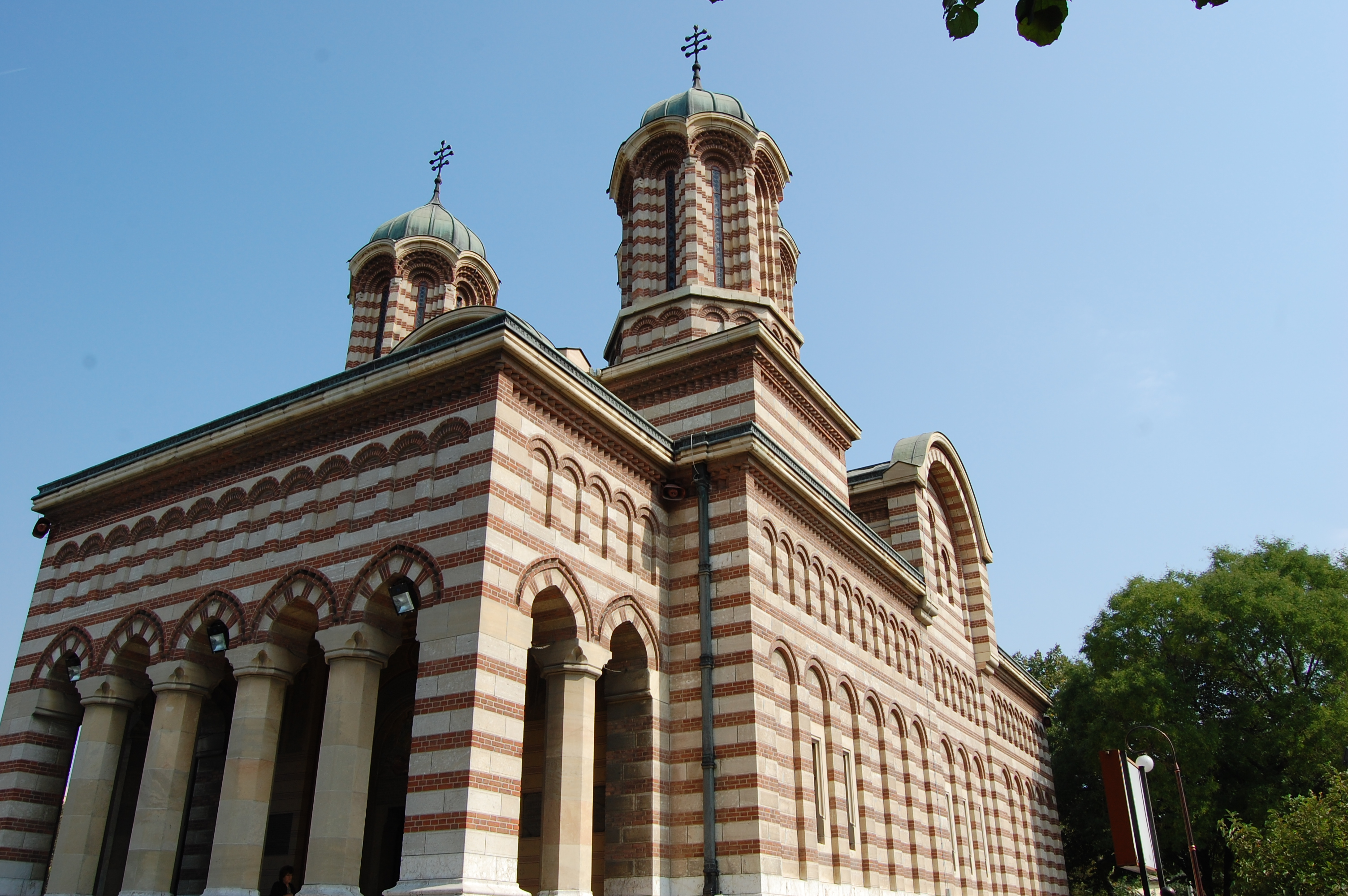
St. Demeter Church

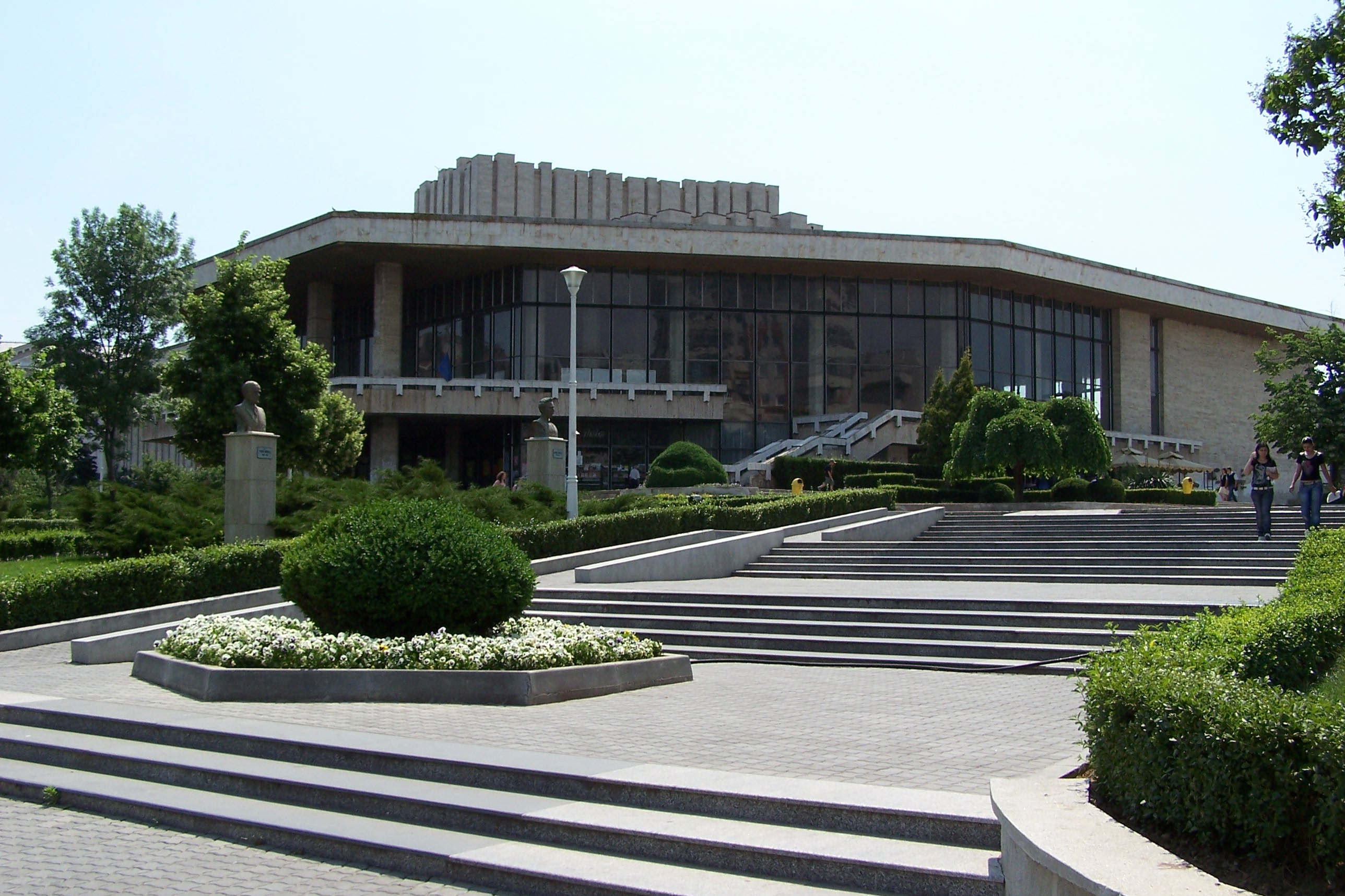
National Theatre

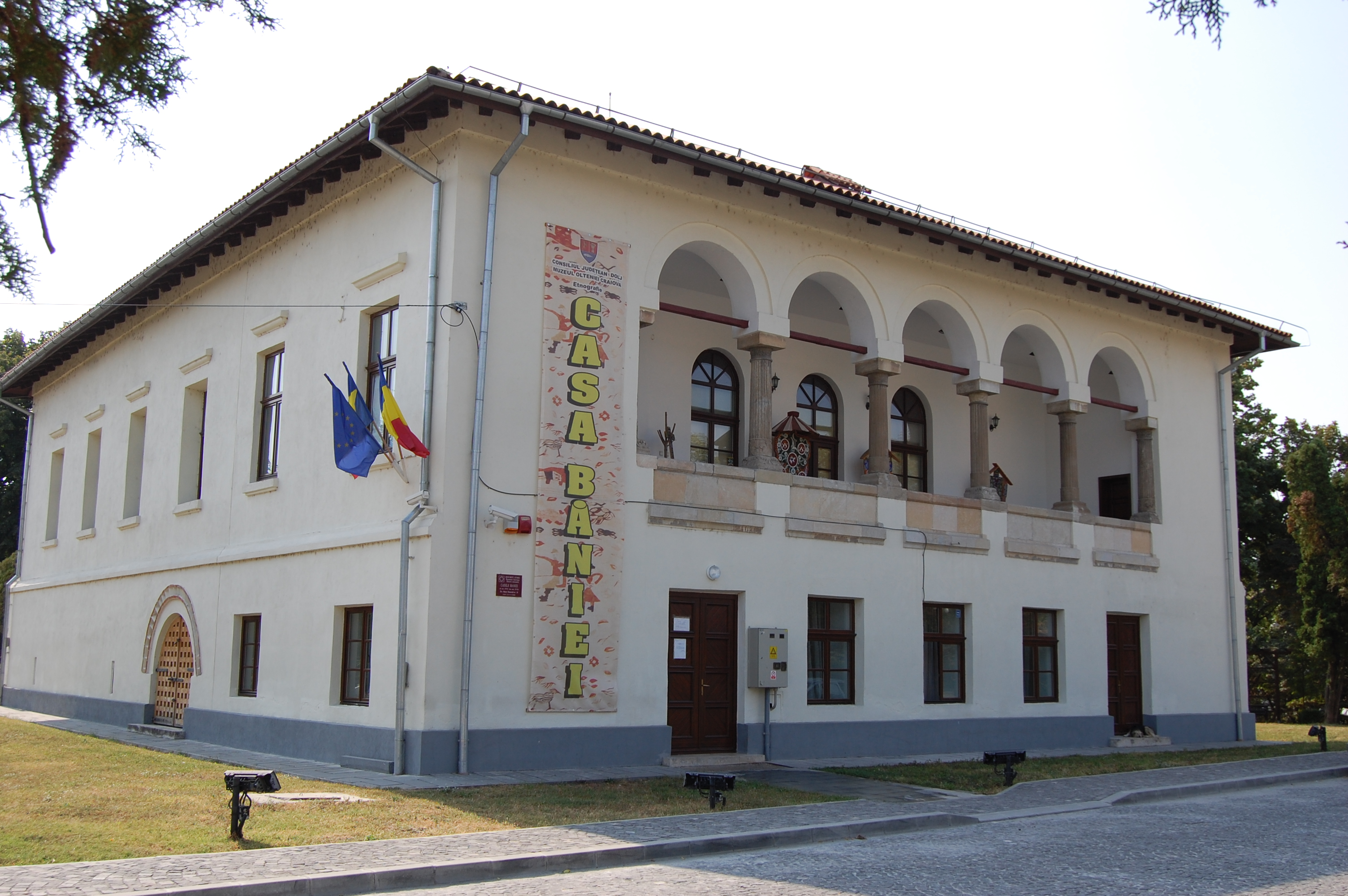
Băniei House

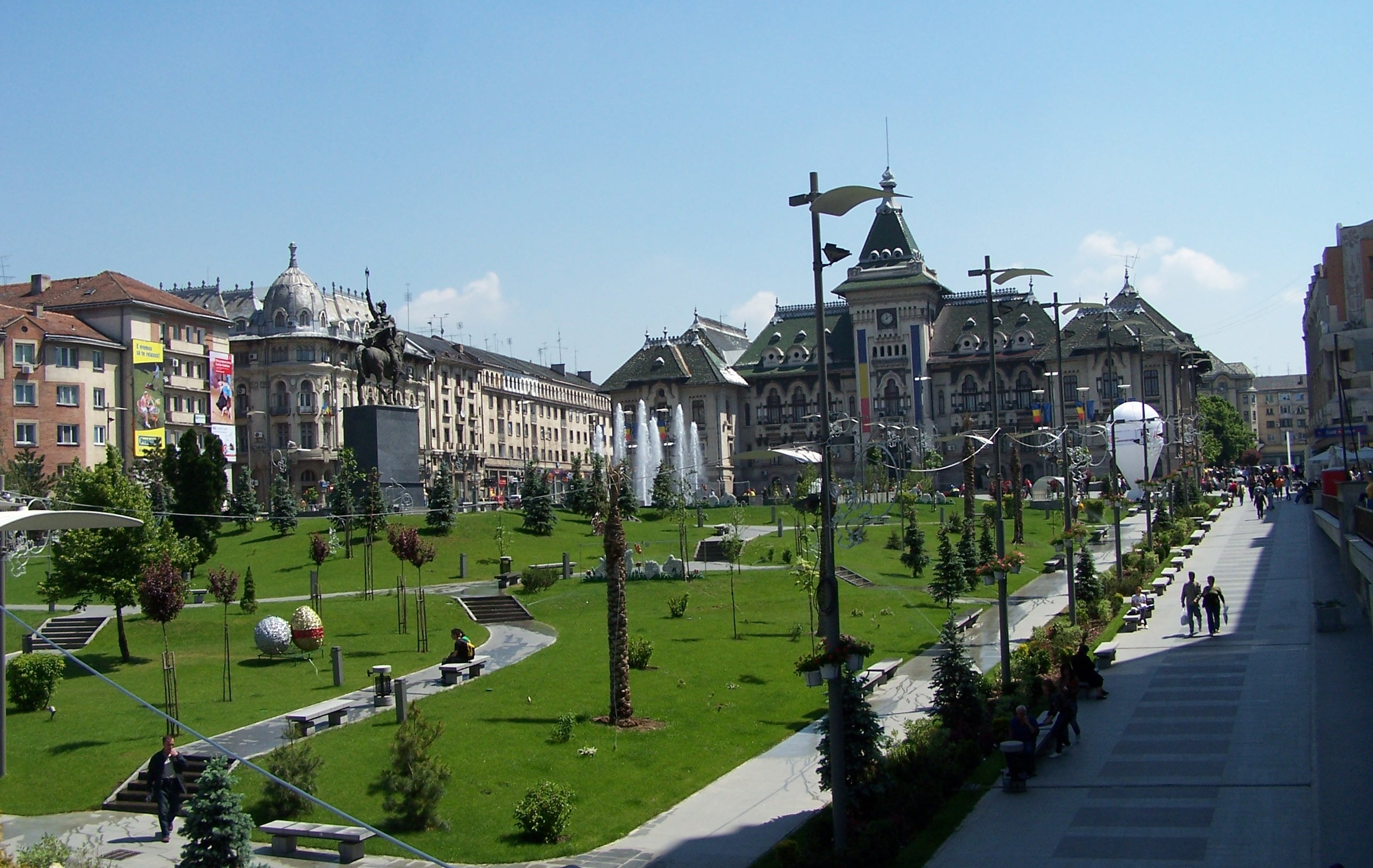
Downtown

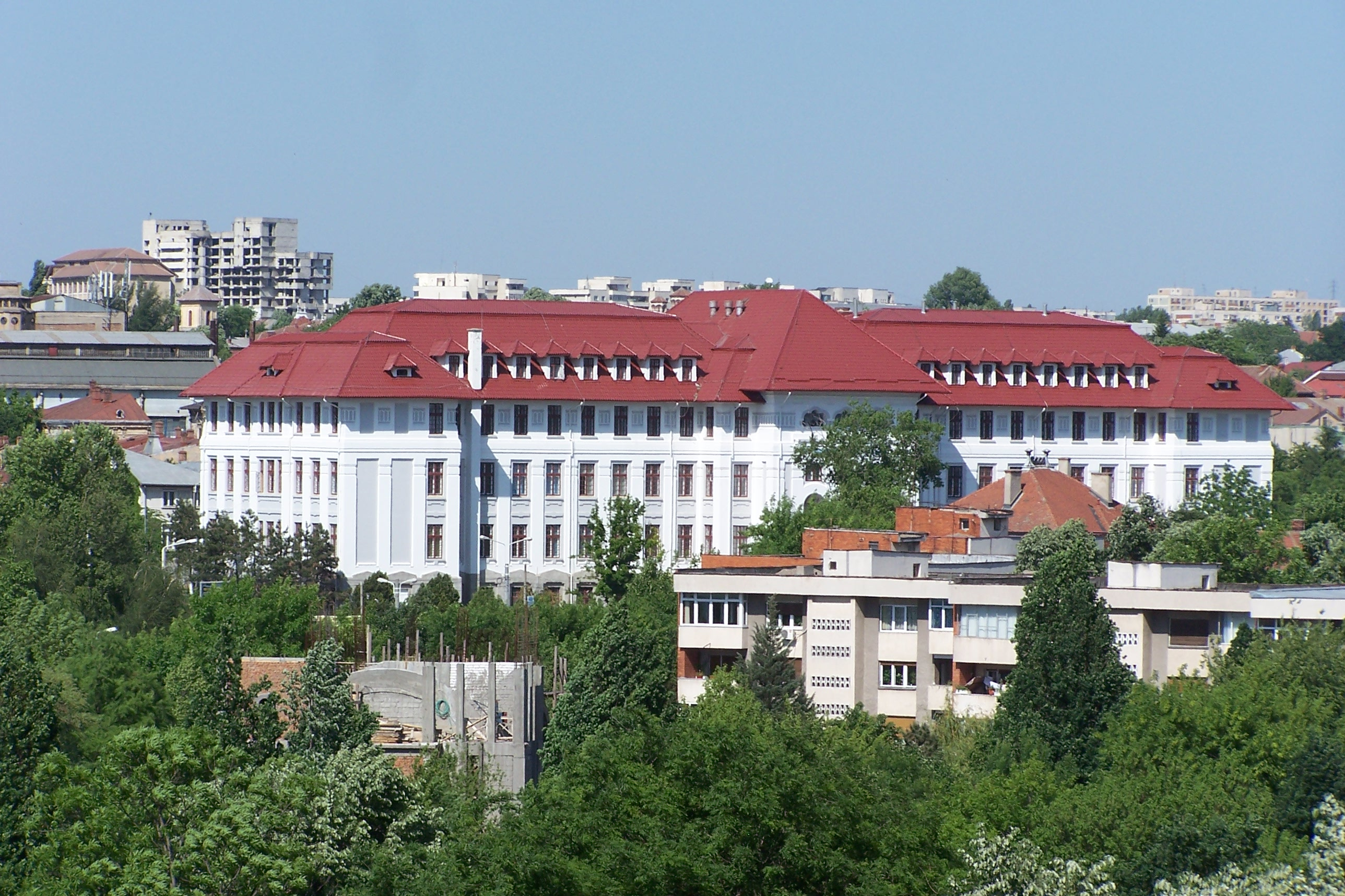
University of Medicine and Pharmacy

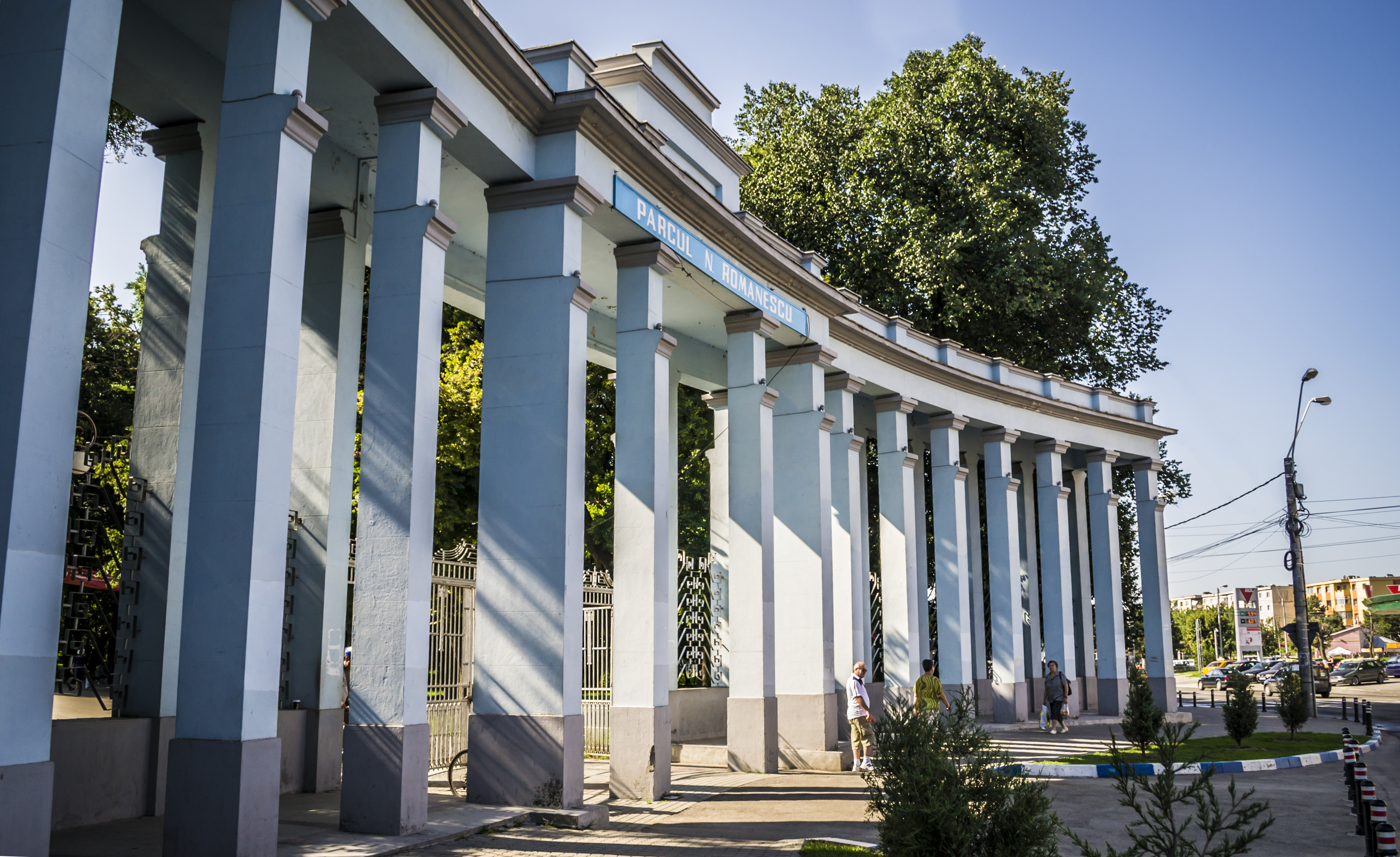
Nicolae Romanescu Park
