= Moisil =

Moisil is a Romanian surname that may refer to:

- Constantin Moisil (1876–1958), historian
- Grigore Moisil (1906–1973), mathematician and computer scientist, son of Constantin
- Iuliu Moisil (1859–1947), schoolteacher and writer, uncle of Constantin
- Grigore Moisil National College of Computer Science (Brașov)
- Łukasiewicz–Moisil algebra
