= Iuliu Moisil =

Romanian writer (1859–1947)

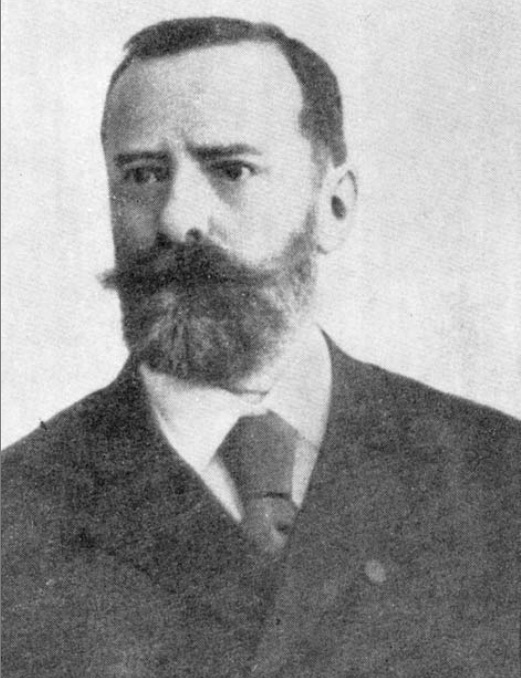
Iuliu Moisil

Iuliu Moisil (May 19, 1859–January 28, 1947) was an Austrian Empire-born Romanian schoolteacher and non-fiction writer.

== Biography ==
Born in Năsăud, in the Transylvania region, his father was the priest Grigore Moisil, while the historian Constantin Moisil was his nephew. A Greek-Catholic, he attended primary school in his native town, followed by the local high school. He then enrolled in the Vienna Polytechnic, where he studied industrial chemistry and natural sciences, and where he was an active member of the România Jună society. He returned home in 1885, ventured to Austrian-ruled Bukovina, and in 1886 became a physics teacher at Radu Greceanu High School in Slatina, in the Romanian Old Kingdom. In 1894, he was transferred to Tudor Vladimirescu High School in Târgu Jiu. Named principal the following year, he supervised construction of a permanent school building. He founded Amicul tinerimii magazine in 1896, leading it until 1899 and later resuming publication at Bucharest; founded Cerbul community bank in 1897 and served as its president; and helped found the Gorj museum in 1900. At Târgu Jiu in 1900, he founded Oltenia's first school for traditional Romanian ceramic pottery.

In 1906, Moisil moved to the national capital Bucharest, where he helped prepare that year's general exposition. From 1906 to 1910, he worked as secretary of the Ethnographic and Folk Art Museum. He then became librarian of the Pedagogic Museum in 1910, and director in 1921. A naturalized Romanian citizen from 1911, he maintained ties with Romanians in Transylvania, heading the Oltenia chapter of the Cultural League for the Unity of All Romanians from 1892. He supported the province's union with Romania, which took place in 1918.

In 1931, he returned to Năsăud; together with Virgil Șotropa and Iulian Marțian, he helped establish the Military Frontier Museum, the town branch of the Romanian Academy library and the local chapter of the National Archives of Romania. Until the end of his life, he headed the Năsăud chapter of ASTRA. During his later years, he edited a good part of his writings on prominent local figures, publishing them in two volumes, in 1937 and 1939. He translated Helen Keller's The Story of My Life and Roy Chapman Andrews' On The Trail of Ancient Man. In all, he left behind about a thousand publications on a broad range of topics. Among the journals to which he contributed were Buletinul Societății Române de Geografie, Convorbiri Literare, Arhivele Olteniei, Arhiva Someșană and Vatra.

Upon being nominated by Dimitrie Gusti, Moisil was elected an honorary member of the Romanian Academy in May 1943. He was made a knight of the Order of the Crown in 1907. In January 1887, at St. Barbara's Greek-Catholic Church in Vienna, he married Anna Emilia Othilda Schwennhagen, the German daughter of an architect from Braunschweig whom the student had probably met at a cultural event. Moisil’s father was initially wary due to the bride’s Lutheran religion, but consented after she promised to adopt the groom’s faith. The newlyweds immediately settled in Slatina, where Othilda founded a successful German kindergarten. The marriage lasted over fifty years and, according to an account left by the widowed husband, proved a very happy union.
