= Radu Dan Constantinescu =

Romanian physicist

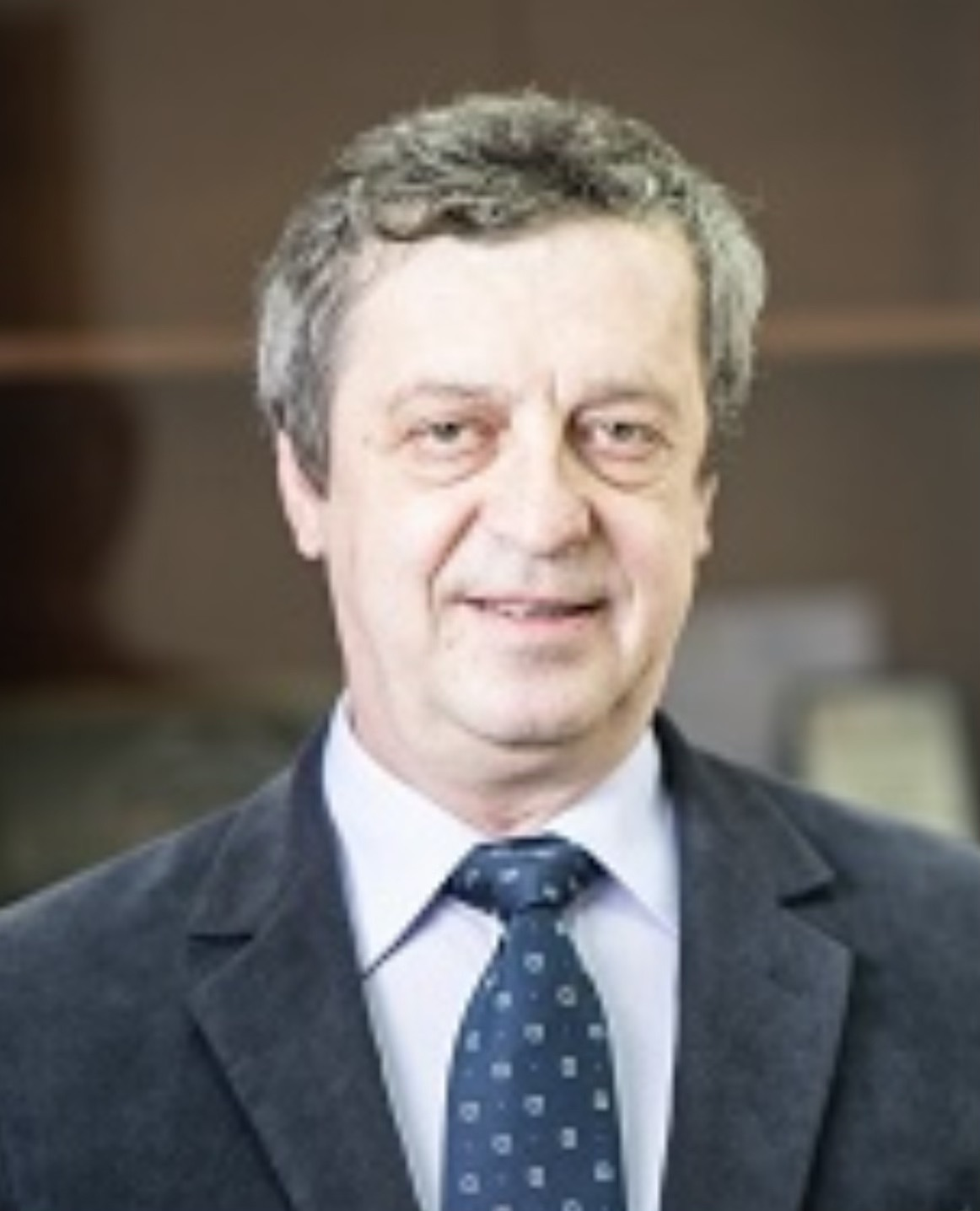
- Born: 17 October 1955; Târgu Jiu, Romania
- Citizenship: Romanian
- Education: University of Craiova
- Scientific career
- Fields: Physics, nonlinear dynamical systems and constrained dynamic systems, gauge field theory and of mathematical models describing nonlinear phenomena
- Thesis: Dynamical implications of the symmetries in models from the quantum field theory

Radu Dan Constantinescu (born 17 October 1955) is a Romanian physicist specializing in the field of nonlinear dynamical systems and constrained dynamic, gauge field theory and of mathematical models describing nonlinear phenomena. He served as Secretary General of the Romanian Physical Society, and is currently the President of the Balkan Physical Union, among other roles in the European physics milieu.

== Early life and education ==
Radu Constantinescu was born in Târgu Jiu, Romania on October 17, 1955. He graduated from the Fraţii Buzeşti National College from Craiova and attended the Faculty of Natural Sciences of the University of Craiova from which he obtained his PhD in physics.

== Career ==
He began his teaching career at the Gheorghe Lazăr National College in Bucharest. He then moved to Craiova where he taught at the Tudor Vladimirescu National College, and Carol I National College. In 1990, he joined the University of Craiova as professor of theoretical physics. He served as Dean of the Faculty of Physics of the Craiova University from 1999 to 2004. Between 2005 and 2009 and 2016 to 2020 he served as vice rector of the University of Craiova on Scientific Research. He also served as the institutional coordinator of the Socrates program at the University of Craiova.

=== Career highlights and recognition ===
In 2009, Constantinescu was elected Secretary General of the Romanian Physical Society. He was also named Vice Chair of the American Romanian Academy of Arts and Sciences congress in 2017. In 2011, he served as representative of Romanian rectors at the Bologna Process. Between 2009 and 2015 he was appointed president of the Southeastern European Network in Mathematical and Theoretical Physics. Between 2013 and 2022 he served as the Chairman of the Committee for European Integration of the European Physical Society. In September 2022 he was elected as the 12th president of the Balkan Physical Union.

== Publications ==
Radu Constantinescu's contributions to physics center on high energy physics, and constraint dynamics. His work was published in Physics Letters A and B, the Journal of Mathematical Physics, Physica Scripta, the International Journal of Modern Physics, the Romanian Journal of Physics, Mathematics, Symmetry, and at the UNESCO Center of Theoretical and Mathematical Physics. He authored or co-authored more than 100 articles published in scientific journals or presented in international conferences, with more than 250 citations.
