= Ciocoiu =

Ciocoiu is a surname. Notable people with the surname include:

- Cristian Ciocoiu (born 1975), Romanian footballer
- Emil Ciocoiu (1948–2020), Romanian painter and photographer
