= Emil Ciocoiu =

Romanian painter and photographer (1948–2020)

- Born: September 13, 1948; Șasa, Romanian People's Republic
- Died: 1 August 2020 (aged 71); Aachen, Germany
- Resting place: Aachen Forest Cemetery
- Education: Nicolae Grigorescu Fine Arts Academy
- Occupations: Painter, photographer
- Website: en.ciocoiu.eu

Emil Ciocoiu (13 September 1948 – 1 August 2020) was a Romanian painter and photographer.

== Biography ==
Born in Șasa, a village in Gorj County, he graduated from the Tudor Vladimirescu High School in Târgu Jiu in 1966. Ciocoiu then studied at the Nicolae Grigorescu Fine Arts Academy in Bucharest from 1968 to 1974. In 1972, he won the Musée 2000 Prize in Luxembourg, and the City of Bucharest awarded him the scholarship of Theodor Aman in 1975. In 1976, he joined the Union of Romanian Artists.

In 1980, under the rule of Nicolae Ceaușescu, Ciocoiu left Communist Romania in search of greater freedom of creation. In an interview he stated, "I left Romania because I lacked freedom of movement and research. A complex artist cannot live without seeing the Sistine Chapel or the Louvre". He settled in Aachen, Germany, where he worked out of his own studio.

From 1994 to 2000, Ciocoiu's works were displayed at the Salon des indépendants in Paris. In 1997, the European Parliament organized an exhibition of his paintings. In 2002, his works were exhibited in Monaco. In 2001, he was the subject of a Romanian documentary on exiles from the country during communist rule titled Mémoire de l'exil roumain.

In 2008, a traveling exhibition of Ciocoiu's works titled Pictor printre stele took place in Romania. His paintings were displayed in Craiova, Bucharest, and the Art Museum of Cluj-Napoca. Some of his paintings are currently kept at the History Museum of Ialomița County.

He was married to Rodica-Daniela Ciocoiu, a violinist with the Aachen Symphony Orchestra. He died in 2020 and was buried at the Forest Cemetery in Aachen.

== Works ==
- La ville (1973)
- Fishermen at Gura Portiței (1975)
- Hiver (1975)
- Peisaj din Babadag (1975)
- Nature morte avec un pot jaune (1976)
- Nature statique (1979)
- Winterlandschaft in Strassburg (1979)
- Bleu infini (1983)
- Christianisme (1990)
- Judaïsme (1990)
- Islamisme (1990)
- Bouddhisme (1990)
- Camino in blu (1991)
- Canzone d'invierno (1991)
- Rue à New York (1993)
- Chanson de l’eau (1992-1994)
- Gente cosmo (1996)
- Romanico (1996)
- Énergie (1999)
- Colonne de feu (2002)
- Inizio (2002)
- Constellation de l'amour (2002)
- Rapsodie cosmique (2005)
- Duomo (2006)
- Éternité (2007)
- Rue de Rome (2007)
- Baltique by night (2007)
- Nesfarsit in rosu
- Buna dimineata Manhattan

== Distinctions ==
- Musée 2000 Prize of Luxembourg (1972)
- Theodor Aman Scholarship (1975)
