= Năsăud =

- Town
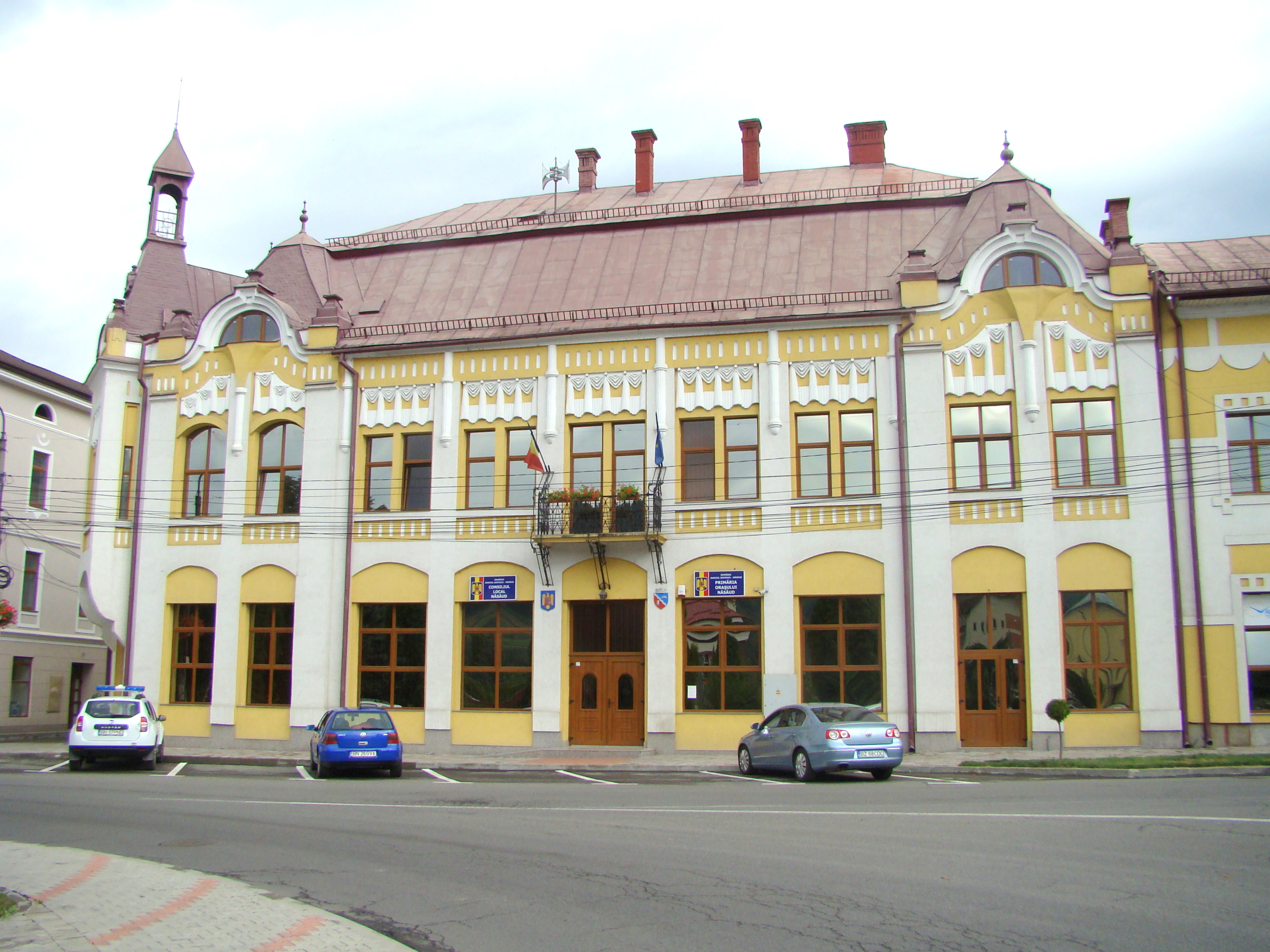
- Năsăud town hall

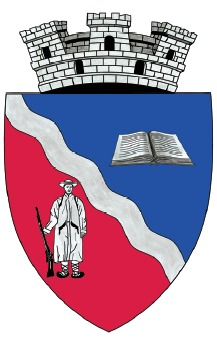
- Coat of arms

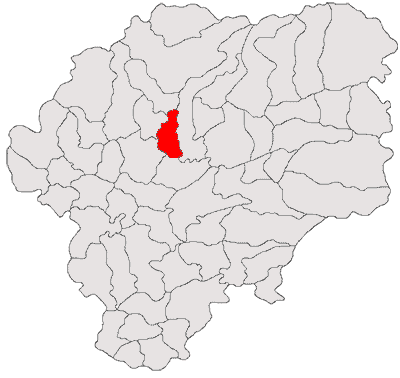
- Location in Bistrița-Năsăud County

- Location in Romania
- Coordinates: 47°17′0″N 24°24′24″E
- Country: Romania
- County: Bistrița-Năsăud

Government
  - Mayor (2024–2028): Dorin-Nicolae Vlașin (PNL)
- Area: 43.25 km^{2} (16.70 sq mi)
- Elevation: 330 m (1,080 ft)
- Population (2021-12-01): 10,215
  - Density: 236.2/km^{2} (611.7/sq mi)
- Time zone: UTC+02:00 (EET)
  - Summer (DST): UTC+03:00 (EEST)
- Postal code: 425200
- Area code: +(40) 263
- Vehicle reg.: BN
- Website: www.primarianasaud.ro

Năsăud (Romanian pronunciation: [nəsəˈud]; German: Nassod, Nußdorf, Nussendorf; Hungarian: Naszód) is a town in Bistrița-Năsăud County in Romania located in the historical region of Transylvania. The town administers two villages, Liviu Rebreanu (until 1958 Prislop; Priszlop) and Lușca (Szamospart).

== Geography ==
The town lies on the Transylvanian Plateau, on the right bank of the Someșul Mare River. It is located in the central part of the county, at a distance of 24 km (15 mi) from the county seat, Bistrița, and 30 km (19 mi) from the town of Beclean.

== History ==
The name Năsăud is possibly derived from the Slavic nas voda, meaning "near the water" or "our water". Another etymology is from Nußdorf (Nussdorf, "walnut tree village"), the Transylvanian Saxon name of the town during the Middle Ages.

A former Habsburg border town known for its border regiments with panache and good schools, Năsăud was the stage for the assembly of 10 September 1848, when the Austrian commander Karl von Urban summoned hundreds of leaders of all 44 districts of the Principality of Transylvania to the town and proclaimed resistance against the Revolution of 1848 and the annexation of Transylvania by Hungary.

In the early 19th century, a Jewish community began to develop on the outskirts of the town. Because Năsăud was a heavily militarized Habsburg border town, strict residency restrictions initially barred Jewish families from settling within the town limits. As a result, Jewish migrants settled in the adjacent village of Entredam, historically known as Jidovița or Jidovits and in Hungarian as Zsidófalva. The name Jidovița derived from the local term for Jewish people, effectively marking it as the town's Jewish quarter. Following the easing of border guard regulations in the mid-19th century, restrictions on Jewish settlement were fully lifted, and the settlement of Entredam was completely integrated into the expanding town of Năsăud.

The early community, which numbered between thirty-five and forty families by 1838, primarily comprised Hasidic migrants who had arrived from the neighboring Máramaros region. Historically, the local Jewish population was divided into two distinct geographic factions: a strongly Hasidic "Polish" congregation with roots in Máramaros and Galicia, and a "Hungarian" congregation composed of Jews who had migrated from western and central parts of the Kingdom of Hungary. These two groups maintained separate religious structures until the 1880s, when they formally merged to establish a unified Orthodox community. While the larger Hasidic faction maintained a traditional wooden synagogue, the town's moderate, "Hungarian" faction established a moderate alternative to both strict Orthodoxy and Reform Neologism, and operated its own separate house of worship and religious school until merging into a unified Orthodox community in 1912. This moderate community was a distinct characteristic of Năsăud and neighboring Bistrița; by contrast, the Jewish populations in the broader, neighboring Máramaros County remained almost entirely Orthodox and Hasidic.

During World War II, following the Second Vienna Award and the German occupation of Hungary, the town's Jewish community was completely destroyed in the Holocaust. In 1941, the Hungarian authorities deported Jews classified as "foreign" to Kamenets-Podolsky, where they were murdered by Nazi forces. In May 1944, a provincial concentration ghetto was briefly established within Năsăud to round up local families before they were transferred to the larger central ghetto in nearby Bistrița. From there, approximately 400 Jews from Năsăud and the surrounding district were deported to the Auschwitz concentration camp in transports leaving on 2 June and 6 June 1944. Although around 110 survivors returned to temporarily reestablish the community after 1945, subsequent emigration to Israel and western nations left only two Jewish families remaining in the town by 1971.

Năsăud saw industrial expansion during the communist era and industrial collapse after the Romanian Revolution of 1989.

Năsăud still has a few late 18th and early 19th century buildings left standing. Most remarkable in this regard is the local Romanian Greek Catholic church and the former military headquarters of the Habsburg era military regiment, now a museum. Although the town hall is located in its midst, the 19th century center of the town has been left to decay. Since 2012 the municipality has begun to restore the buildings in the old city center. The town hall saw a complete restoration and expansion in 2013.

== Demographics ==
Historical population
Year	Pop.	±%
1930	3,512	—
1948	3,716	+5.8%
1956	5,725	+54.1%
1966	6,620	+15.6%
1977	8,610	+30.1%
1992	12,176	+41.4%
2002	11,365	−6.7%
2011	9,077	−20.1%
2021	10,215	+12.5%
Source: Census data

At the 2021 census, Năsăud had a population of 10,215. At the 2011 census, 93.6% of inhabitants were Romanians, 5.5% Roma, and 0.6% Hungarians.

== Economy ==
Local economic activity revolves around the remittance economy generated by massive outmigration to Spain and Italy during the early 2000s, although the largest industrial employers in textiles and chemicals have been rejuvenated by European Union membership.

The economic upturn of the mid-2000s has translated into a better city life and infrastructure improvements. Most notable in this regard are the refurbishing of the old military headquarters (now a museum), improved roads and more bar/restaurant options.

== Education ==
The town is the home of the George Coșbuc National College.

== Natives ==
- Tudor Bompa (born 1932), sports scientist, professor at York University
- Joel Brand (1906–1964), member of the Budapest Aid and Rescue Committee during the Holocaust
- Nicolae Bretan (1887–1968), opera composer, baritone, conductor, and music critic
- Vasile Dîncu (born 1961), politician
- Tudor Drăganu (1912–2010), jurist
- Sergiu Homei (born 1987), footballer
- Veronica Micle (1850–1889), poet, best known for her love affair with Mihai Eminescu
- Constantin C. Moisil (1876–1958), archivist, historian, numismatist, and schoolteacher
- Iuliu Moisil (1859–1947), schoolteacher and non-fiction writer
- Sandu Negrean (born 1974), footballer
- Ovidiu Nimigean (born 1962), writer
- Leonida Pop (1831–1908), officer in the Austrian Imperial Army

== Photo gallery ==
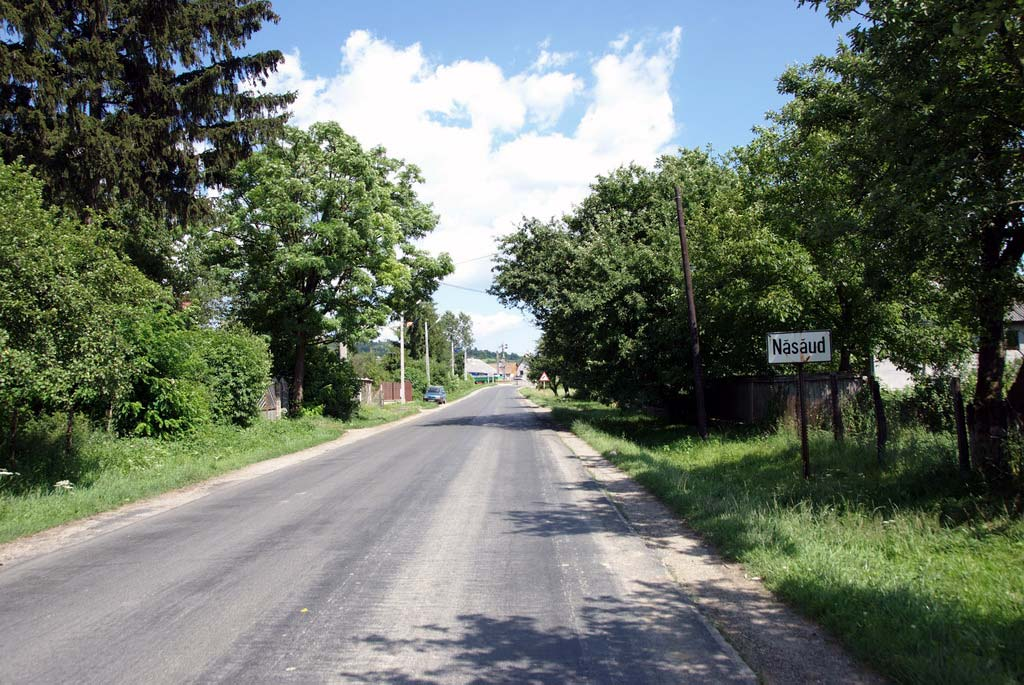
Entrance from the west

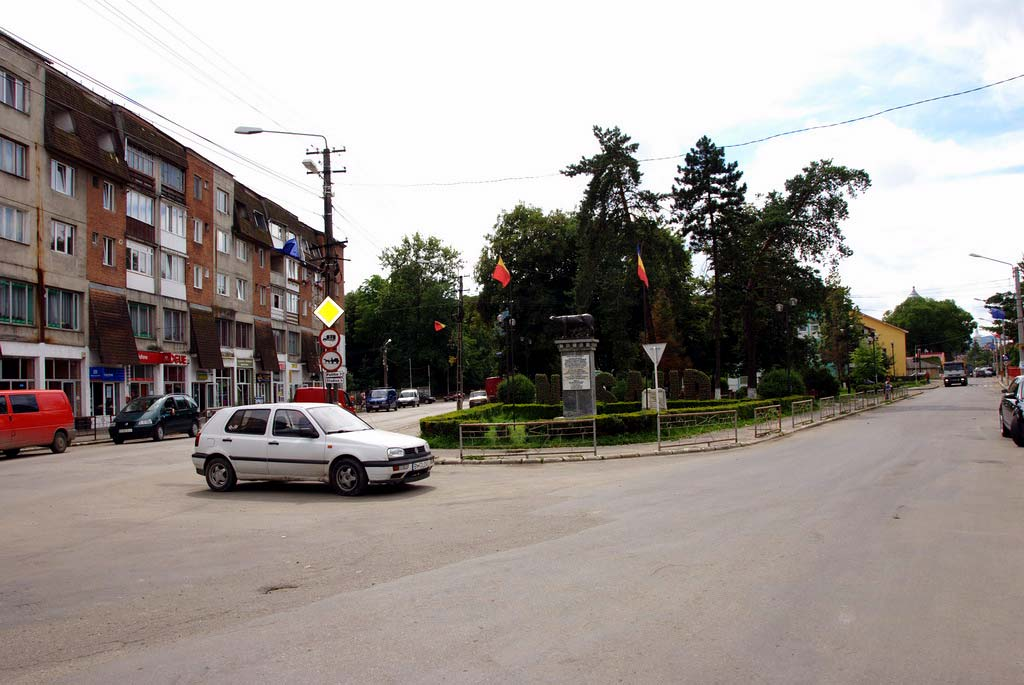
View from the east

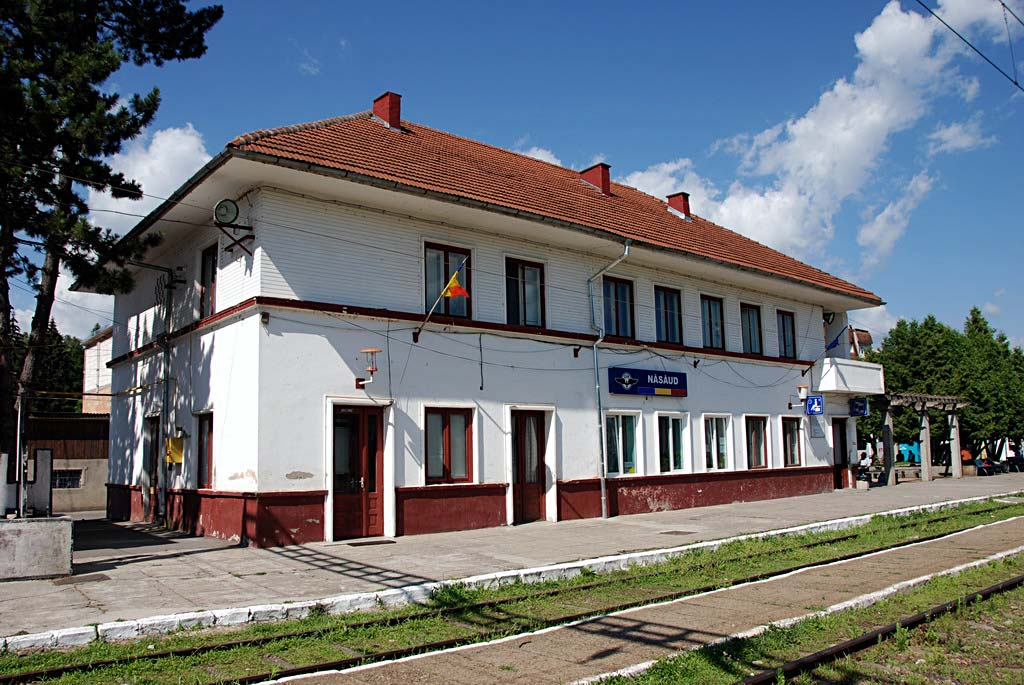
Train station

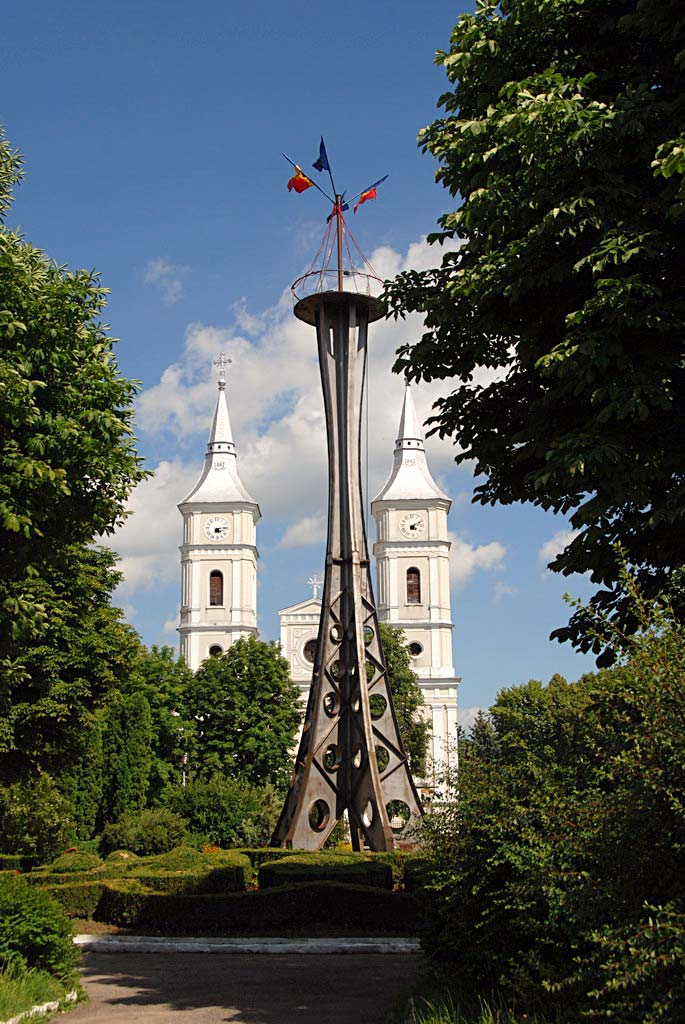
Towers of the Romanian Greek-Catholic church

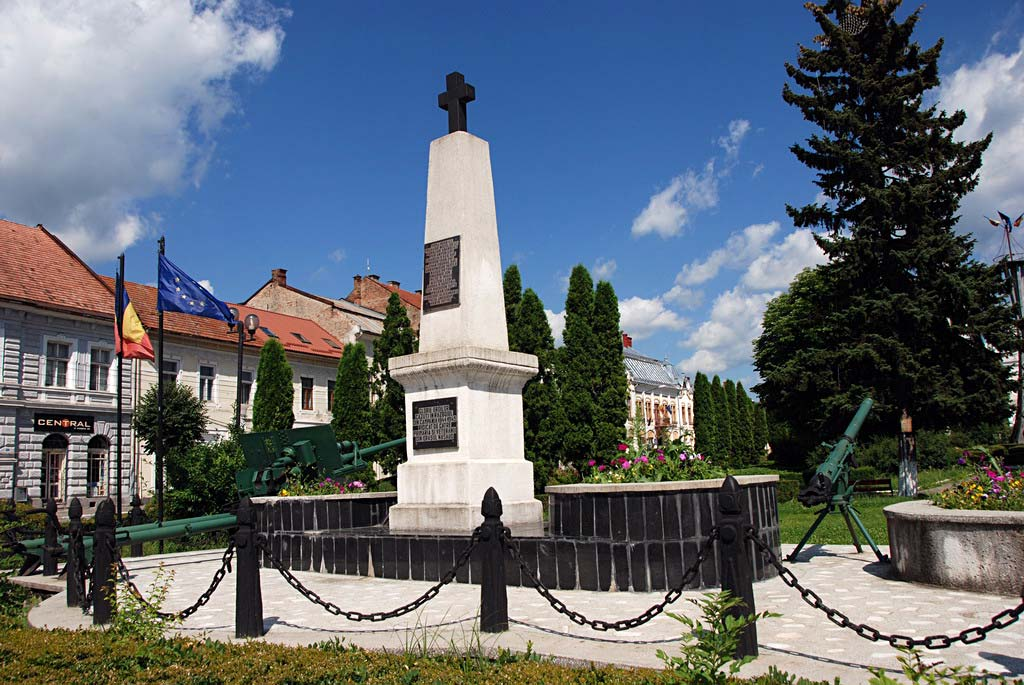
Monument in the park

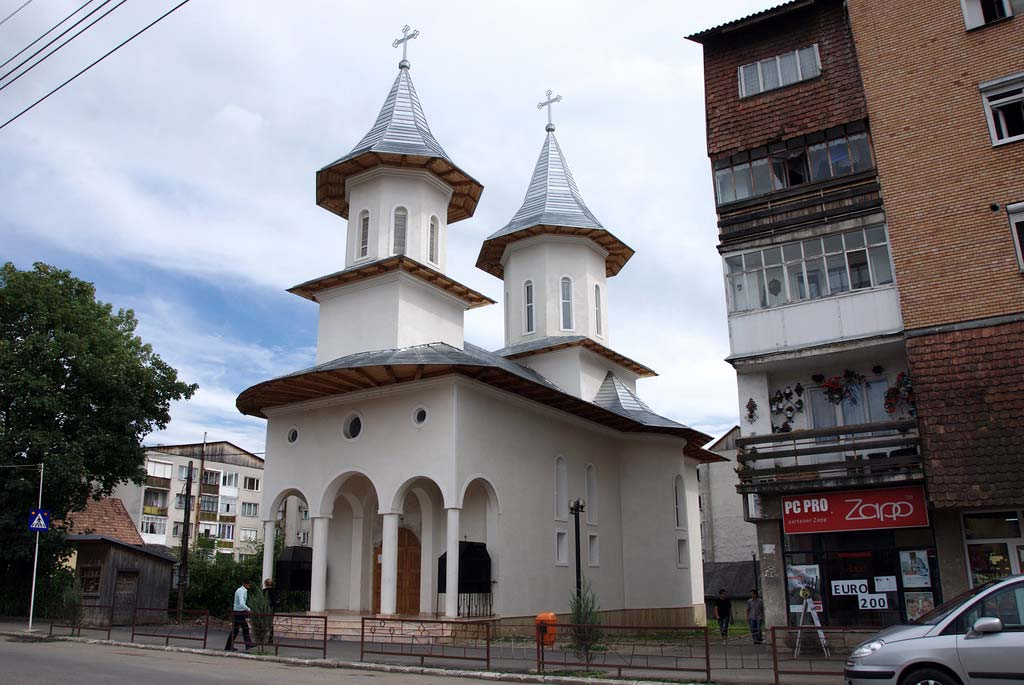
Romanian Orthodox church
