= Sculptural Ensemble of Constantin Brâncuși at Târgu Jiu =

Sculptural ensemble by Constantin Brancuși in Romania

Brâncuși Monumental Ensemble of Târgu Jiu
UNESCO World Heritage Site
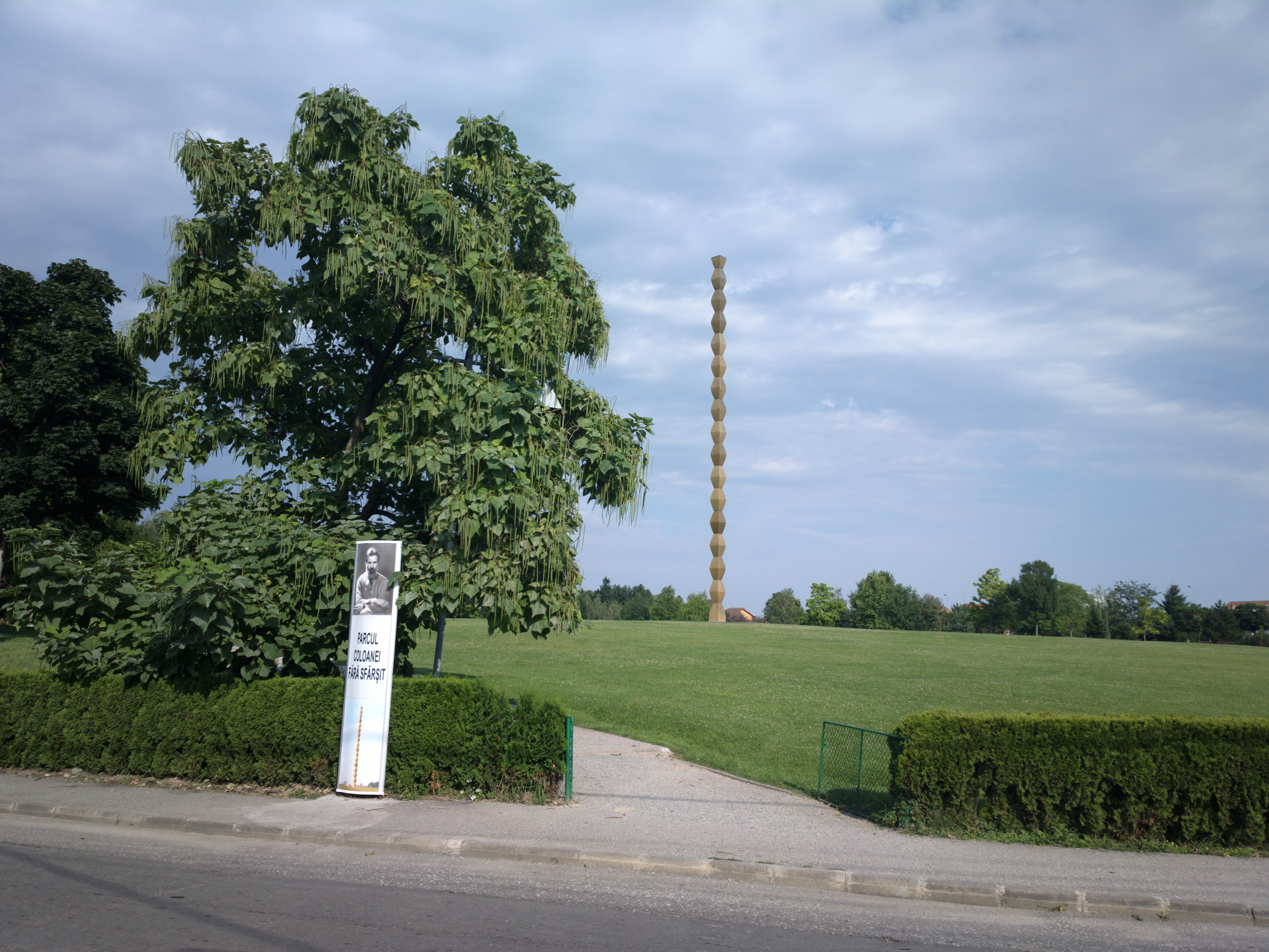
- The Infinity Column (Coloana Infinitului)

- Location within Romania
- Location: Târgu Jiu, Gorj County, Romania
- Includes: Masa tăcerii, Poarta sărutului, Coloana Infinitului
- Criteria: Cultural (i), (ii)
- Reference: 1473
- Inscription: 2024 (46th Session)
- Coordinates: 45.0394°N 23.2687°E

The Sculptural Ensemble of Constantin Brâncuși at Târgu Jiu (Romanian: Ansamblul sculptural Constantin Brâncuși de la Târgu-Jiu) is an homage to the Romanian heroes of the First World War. The ensemble comprises three sculptures: The Table of Silence (Masa tăcerii), The Gate of the Kiss (Poarta sărutului), and the Endless Column (Coloana fără Sfârșit) on an axis 1.3 km (3/4 mile) long, oriented west to east. The ensemble is considered to be one of the great works of 20th-century outdoor sculpture. The ensemble was inscribed as a UNESCO World Heritage Site in 2024.

== History ==
The monument was commissioned by the National League of Gorj Women to honor those soldiers who had defended Târgu Jiu in 1916 from the forces of the Central Powers. Constantin Brâncuși (1876–1957) was at the time living in Paris, but welcomed the opportunity to create a large commemorative sculpture in his homeland. He accepted the commission in 1935, but refused to receive payment for it.

== The Endless Column ==
The Endless Column symbolizes the concept of infinity and the infinite sacrifice of the Romanian soldiers. The Infinity Column stacks 15 rhomboidal modules, with a half-unit at the top and bottom, making a total of 16. The incomplete top unit is thought to be the element that expresses the concept of the infinite. Brâncuși had experimented with this form as early as 1918, with an oak version now found in the collection of the Museum of Modern Art in New York City. The modules were made in the central workshop of Petroșani (Atelierele Centrale Petroșani), assembled by Brâncuși's friend engineer Ștefan Georgescu-Gorjan (1905–1985), and completed on 27 October 1938. All 16 rhomboidal modules accumulate a total height of 29.3 m.

In the 1950s, the Romanian communist government planned to demolish the column and turn it into scrap metal, but this plan was never executed. After the Romanian Revolution of 1989 and the fall of the Communist regime, there was renewed interest in restoring the column, which by that time suffered from tilting, cracking, metal corrosion, and an unstable foundation. For these reasons the site was listed in the 1996 World Monuments Watch by the World Monuments Fund. The restoration was facilitated by the Fund, which organized meetings for the stakeholders in 1998 and provided funding through American Express. Subsequently, the site was restored between 1998 and 2000 through a collaborative effort of the Romanian Government, the World Monuments Fund, the World Bank, and other Romanian and international groups.

== Ensemble ==
Two other pieces constitute the Ensemble.

The Table of Silence is a circular stone table surrounded by twelve hourglass-seats, which symbolize time. The significance of Brâncuși's sculpture has been subjected to many interpretations. Some say that The Table of Silence represents the moment before the battle. Nevertheless, the seats are not located close to the edges of the table. Others say that it represents The Last Supper, in which the twelve apostles are seated around Jesus. The chairs are for the apostles and the table represents Jesus himself.

The Gate of the Kiss, of Banpotoc travertine (marble), features two kiss motifs on the pillars. The entire gate has a width of 6.45 m and a height of 5.13 m. The transition to another life occurs through The Gate of the Kiss.

The Ensemble was inaugurated on 27 October 1938. During the Socialist Realism epoch, Brâncuși was challenged as an exponent of "cosmopolitan bourgeois formalism". However, in 1964, Brâncuși was rediscovered in Romania as a national genius and consequently the Ensemble of Târgu Jiu was restored from a long period of degradation.

== Gallery ==
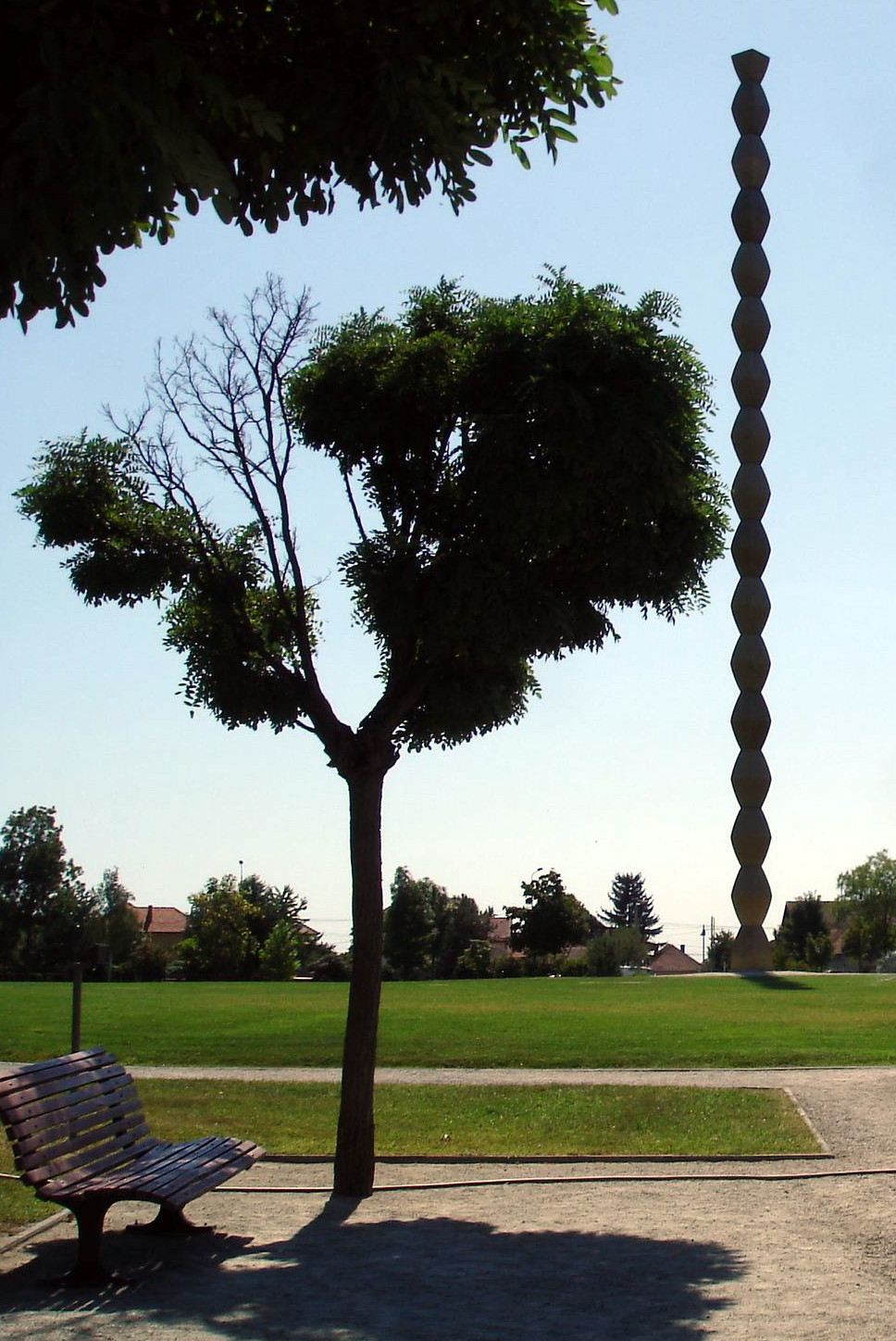
Infinity Column

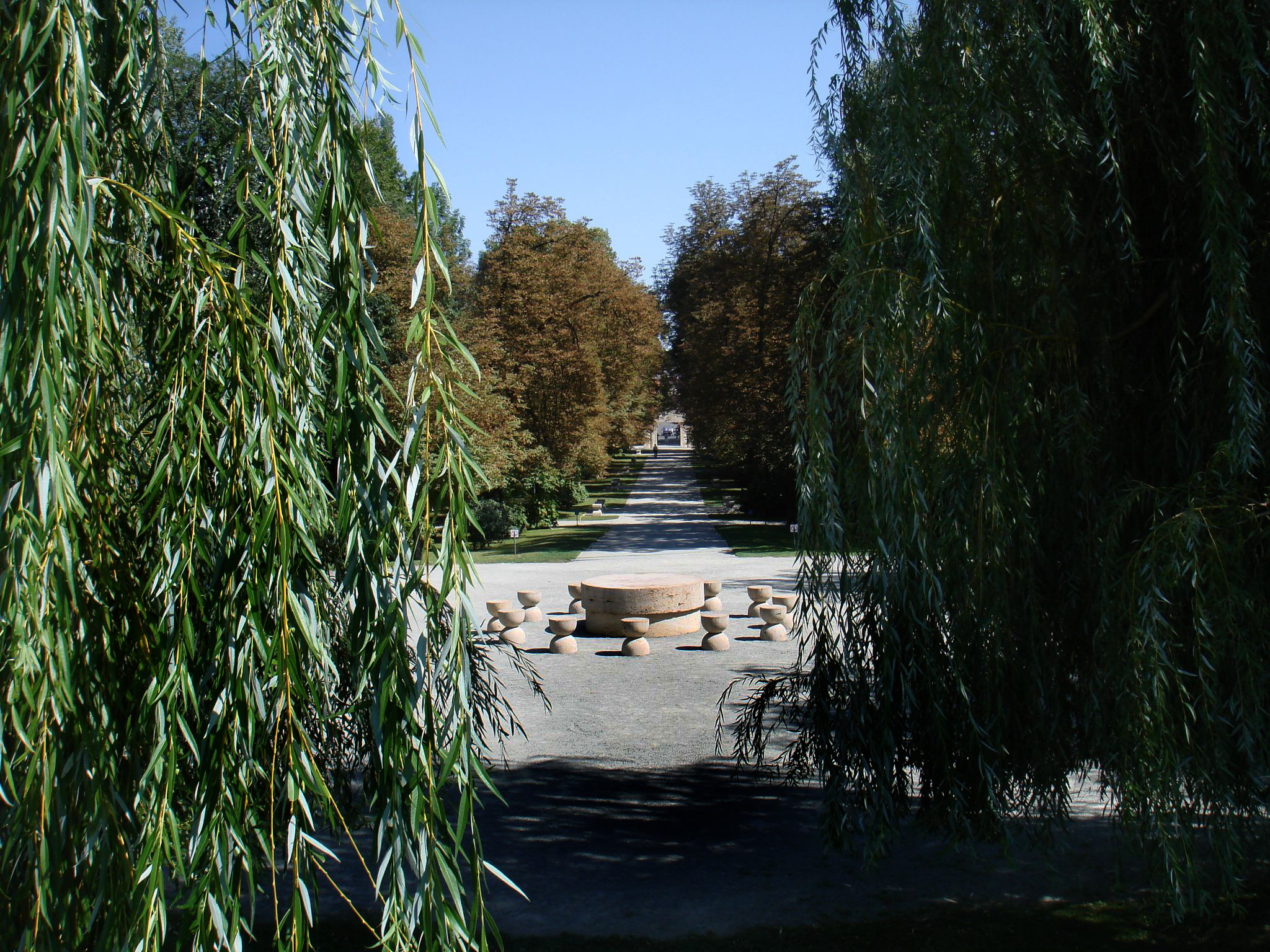
The Table of Silence

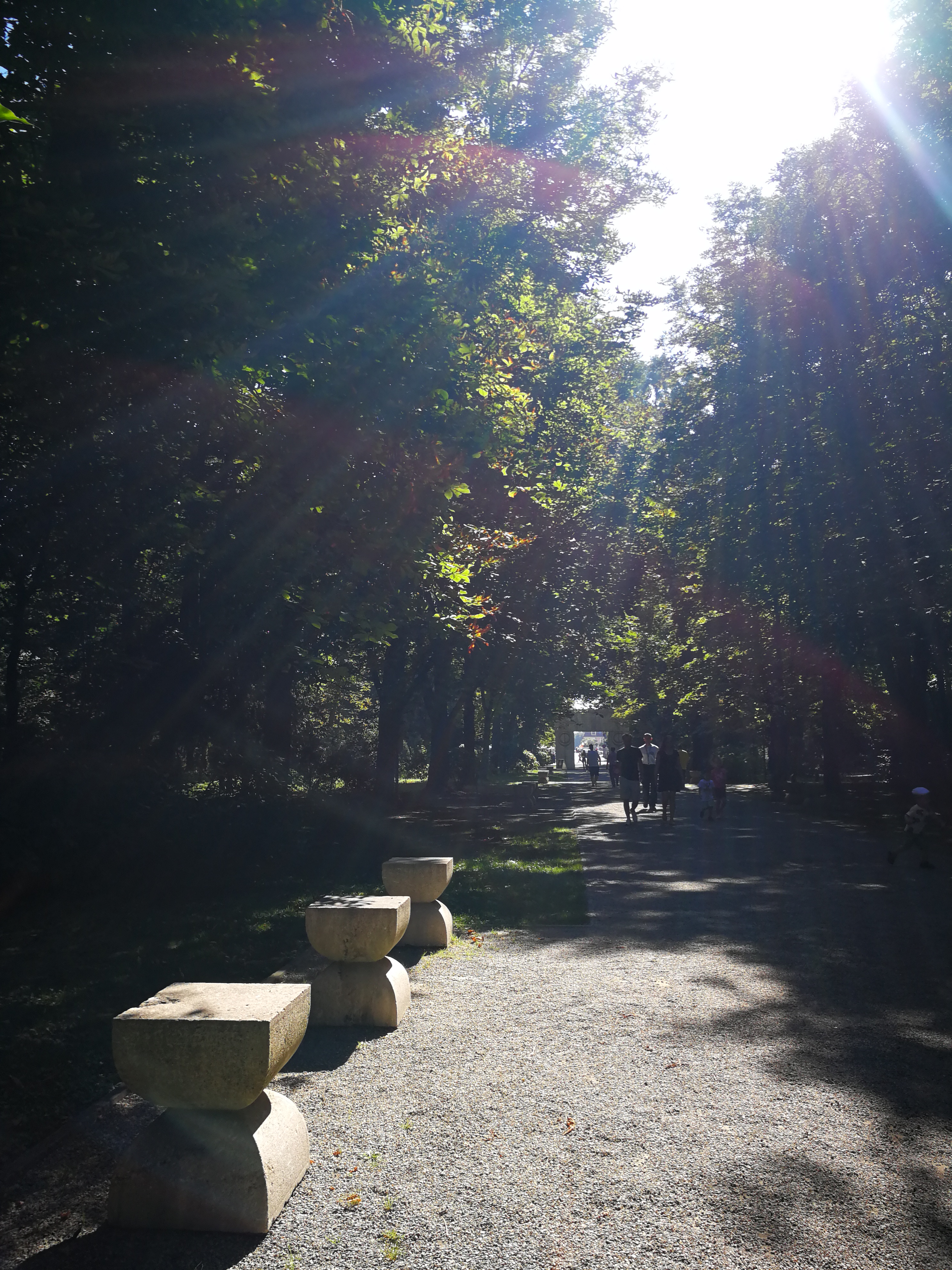
The Gate of the Kiss

== See also ==
- Seven Wonders of Romania
