= Dănești, Gorj =

Dănești
- Commune
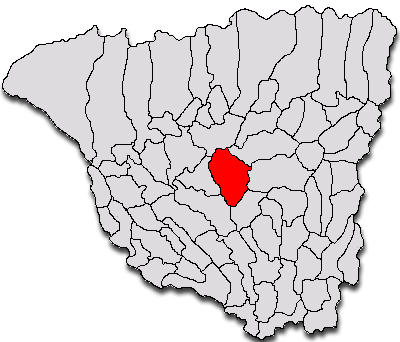
- Location in Gorj County

- Location in Romania
- Coordinates: 44°58′N 23°20′E
- Country: Romania
- County: Gorj
- Subdivisions: Barza, Botorogi, Brătuia, Bucureasa, Dănești, Merfulești, Șasa, Trocani, Țârculești, Ungureni, Văcarea
- Area: 87.47 km^{2} (33.77 sq mi)
- Population (2021-12-01): 4,703
  - Density: 53.77/km^{2} (139.3/sq mi)
- Time zone: UTC+02:00 (EET)
  - Summer (DST): UTC+03:00 (EEST)
- Vehicle reg.: GJ

Dănești is a commune in Gorj County, Oltenia, Romania. It is composed of eleven villages: Barza, Botorogi, Brătuia, Bucureasa, Dănești, Merfulești, Șasa, Trocani, Țârculești, Ungureni and Văcarea.

== Natives ==
- Emil Ciocoiu
