= Tudor Vladimirescu National College =

Coordinates: 45.0373°N 23.2739°E

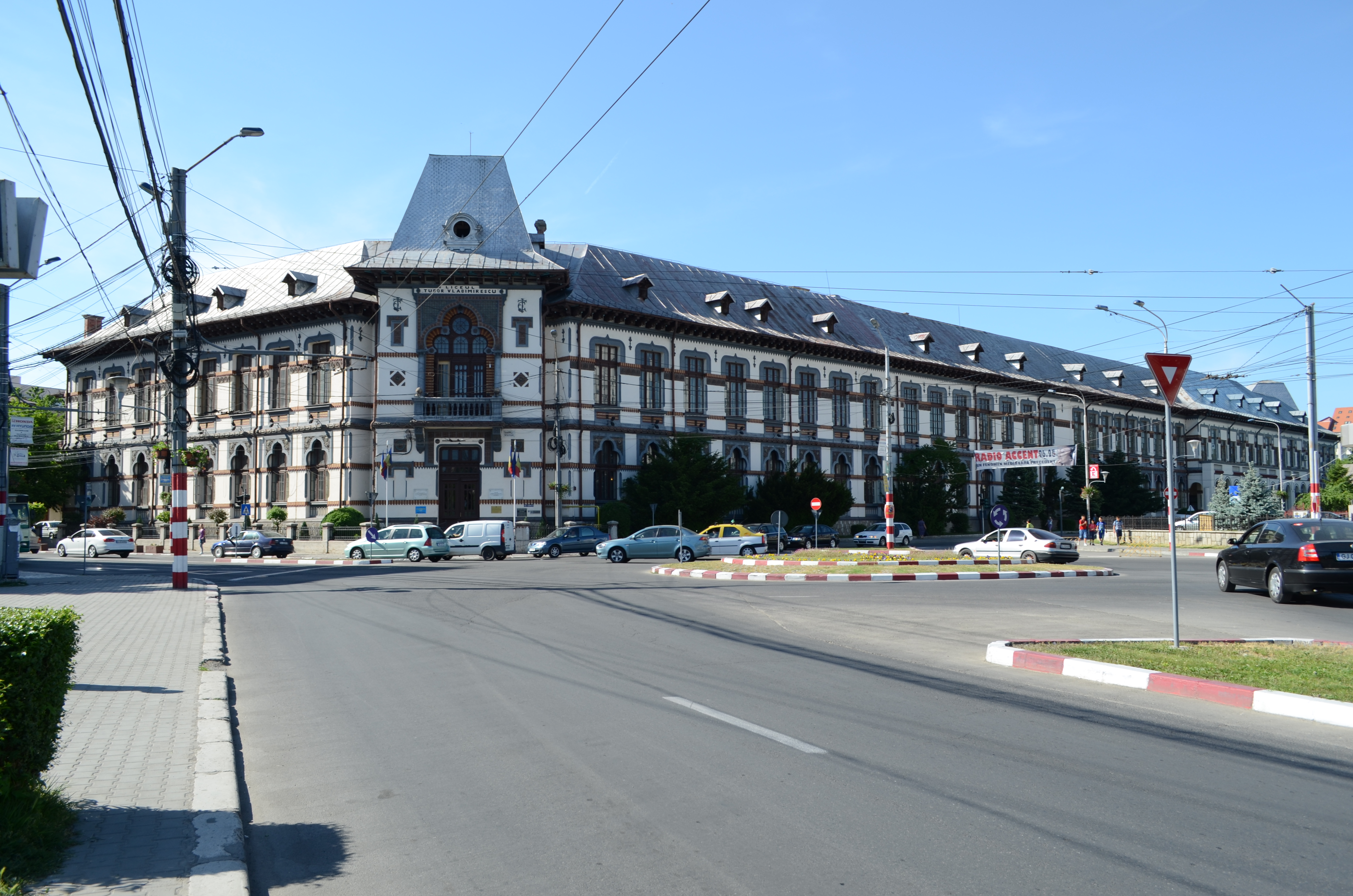
Tudor Vladimirescu National College

Tudor Vladimirescu National College (Romanian: Colegiul Național Tudor Vladimirescu) is a high school located at 13 Unirii Street, Târgu Jiu, Romania.

For some time, the residents of Târgu Jiu had requested a permanent school. Their cause was taken up by the local notable Toma Cămărășescu, who in 1890 helped persuade Education Minister Titu Maiorescu to sign an order establishing a gymnasium. The school opened later that year, and was named after revolutionary Tudor Vladimirescu in 1897. In 1919, the institution became a high school, with the first class graduating in 1923.

Girls were first admitted in 1961, when a nearby girls’ high school was merged into Vladimirescu. In 1972–1973, the school building began to host an institute for junior engineers. From 1977 until the Romanian Revolution, the institution focused mainly on mathematics and physics. It was declared a national college in 1999.

The school building was started in 1891 and completed three years later. Soon afterwards, a pottery school and county museum were opened inside. It is listed as a historic monument by Romania's Ministry of Culture and Religious Affairs.

== Faculty and alumni ==
=== Faculty ===
- Ștefan Bobancu
- Iuliu Moisil

=== Alumni ===
- Mircea Beuran
- Emil Ciocoiu
- Petru Dumitriu
- Iosif Keber
- Mihail Lascăr
- Horațiu Mălăele
