= Constantin Moisil =

Romanian historian and archaeologist (1876 - 1958)

Constantin C. Moisil
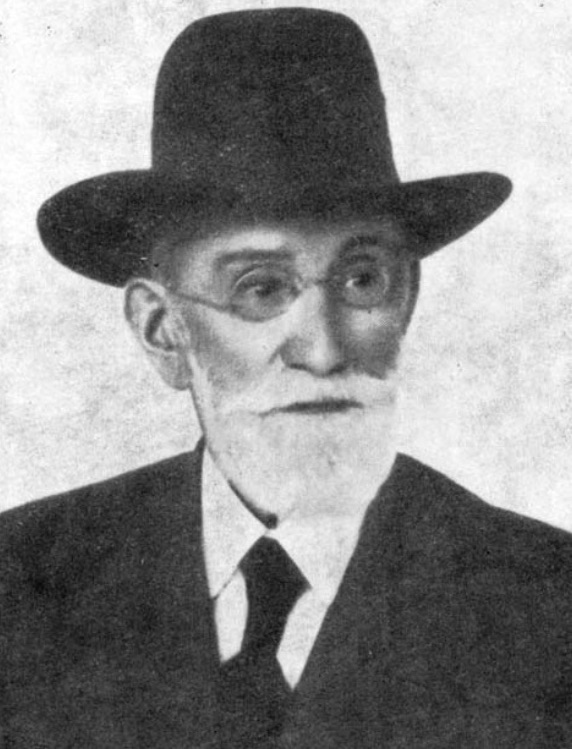
- Born: December 8, 1876; Năsăud
- Died: October 22, 1958 (aged 81); Bucharest
- Education: University of Bucharest; University of Cluj
- Occupations: archivist, historian
- Children: Grigore Moisil
- Father: Constantin Gr. Moisil
- Relatives: Iuliu Moisil (uncle)

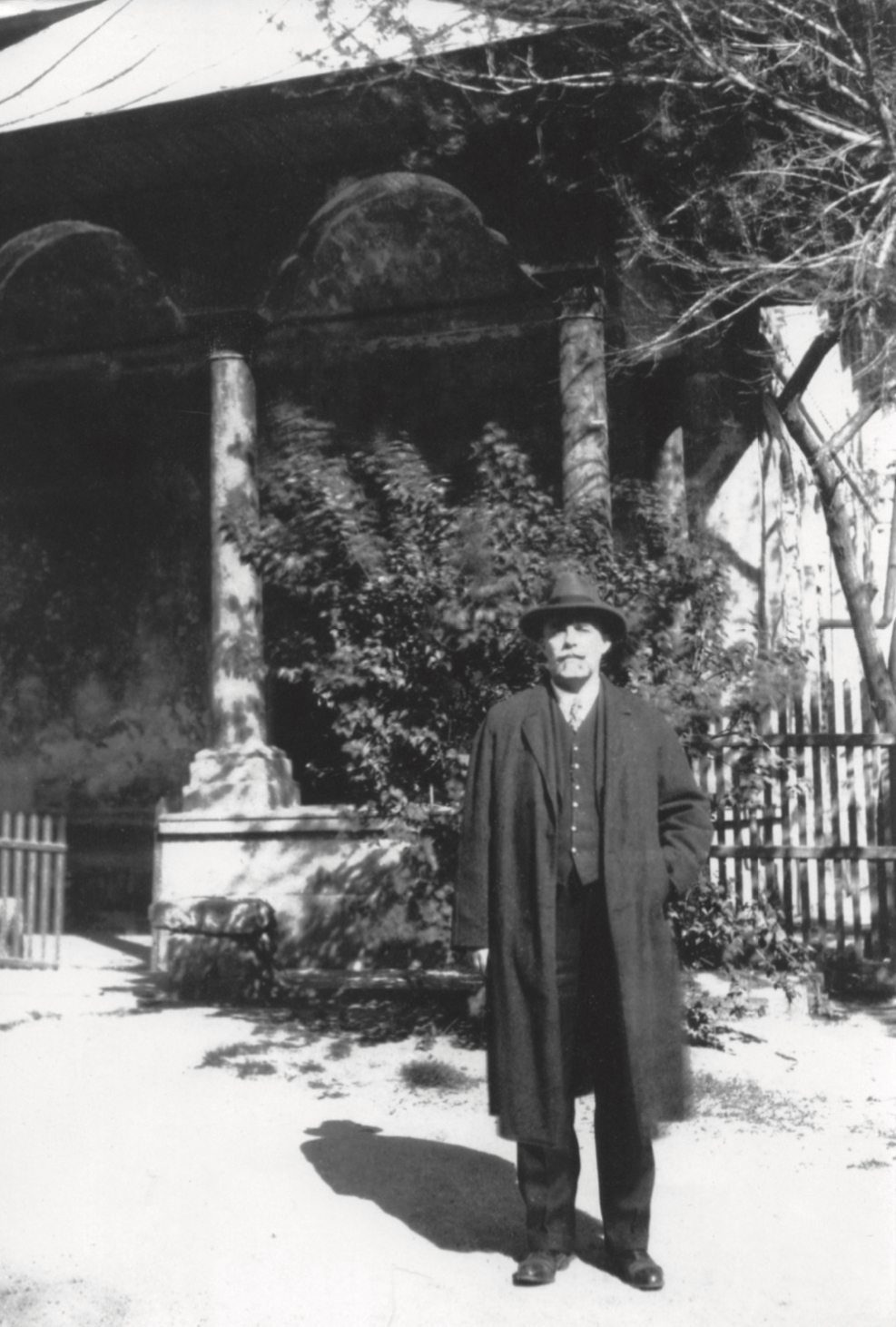
Moisil as State Archives director in 1926, in the courtyard of Mihai Vodă Monastery, where the institution was then located

Constantin C. Moisil (December 8, 1876–October 22, 1958) was an Austro-Hungarian-born Romanian archivist, historian, numismatist and schoolteacher.

Born in Năsăud, in the Transylvania region, his grandfather Grigore Moisil was a priest; his father Constantin Gr. Moisil, who had a doctorate from the University of Vienna, was a teacher; and his uncle was the teacher and writer Iuliu Moisil. He attended primary school in his native town, followed by the local high school. He then enrolled in the history section of the literature faculty at the University of Bucharest, in the Romanian Old Kingdom. His research interests centered on original or unusual aspects, a direction borrowed from his professors, who included Nicolae Iorga, Dimitrie Onciul and V. A. Urechia. This was reflected as early as his undergraduate thesis, on prehistoric archaeology. In particular, his inclination toward archaeology was initiated by his professor Grigore Tocilescu. After graduating in 1898, he taught high school in Focșani (1898-1899), in Tulcea (1899-1910) and finally in Bucharest, at Matei Basarab High School. In 1905, he began regular contributions on a variety of subjects to Convorbiri Literare, among other magazines.

His return to Bucharest coincided with his becoming assistant at the Romanian Academy's newly established numismatics section, a subject in which his interest had grown during his Tulcea years. This passion had brought him into contact with another numismatist, Dimitrie Sturdza, who helped engineer Moisil's hiring by the Academy. Moisil would become head of the section in 1933, holding the post until his death. He joined the Romanian Numismatic Society in 1913 and became editor of its bulletin. In 1920, he began editing another one of its publications, and he ascended to its presidency in 1933, remaining in the position until he died. As president, he held annual congresses between 1933 and 1937. He was the first to classify Geto-Dacian money, and extensively studied medieval Romanian coins. In 1924, twenty-six years after earning his undergraduate degree, he received his doctorate at the University of Cluj. The topic of his dissertation was the Wallachian mint under the House of Basarab. He published this work partly as a result of his experience at the numismatics section, and it appears to have been Romania's first doctorate dealing with numismatics.

Moisil was elected a corresponding member of the Academy in June 1919, upon the proposal of Vasile Pârvan. He headed the State Archives from 1923 to 1938. His appointment as head took place in the autumn of 1923, and was somewhat surprising given his almost entire lack of publications in archivistics. Onciul, the archives' director from 1900 to 1923, had died earlier in the year. Initially succeeded by Alexandru Lapedatu, a replacement had to be found when the latter soon resigned to become Religious Affairs and Arts Minister. Moisil was selected after receiving favorable recommendations from the country's universities and from specialists. He started the country's first archival journal, Revista Arhivelor. The first volume's first number appeared in 1924, and by the time the first volume concluded in 1926, the publication had attracted contributions from Nicolae Iorga, Ioan Lupaș, Ilie Minea, Petre P. Panaitescu, Ioan C. Filitti, Dan Simonescu, Emil Vârtosu, Paul Gore, Ștefan Meteș, Sever Zotta and Mihai Costăchescu. The magazine's initial run ended 1947, and covered seven volumes in fifteen numbers.

Moisil advocated a new legal statute for the archives, one that would both take into account the realities of an enlarged Greater Romania and the damage that Romanian archives had undergone during World War I. The law, which he largely inspired, was passed by the Romanian Parliament in May 1925. It provided for a central archive in Bucharest, with regional directorates at Iași, Cluj, Cernăuți, and Chișinău. He drew up plans for the country's first school for training archivists, which opened under his direction in 1924 and reached university level in 1932. By mid-1924, he had opened an exhibition space at the archives, which became a permanent museum of the institution's rare holdings in 1926. As director, he published over 570 studies, including 42 in history, 93 in archaeology, 160 in numismatics, 41 on medals, 22 on seals, 4 in metrology and 15 in didactics, as well as works on heraldry. In August 1948, following a purge of the old members by the new Communist regime, he became a titular member of the Academy. His son was the mathematician Grigore Moisil.
