= National Archives of Romania =

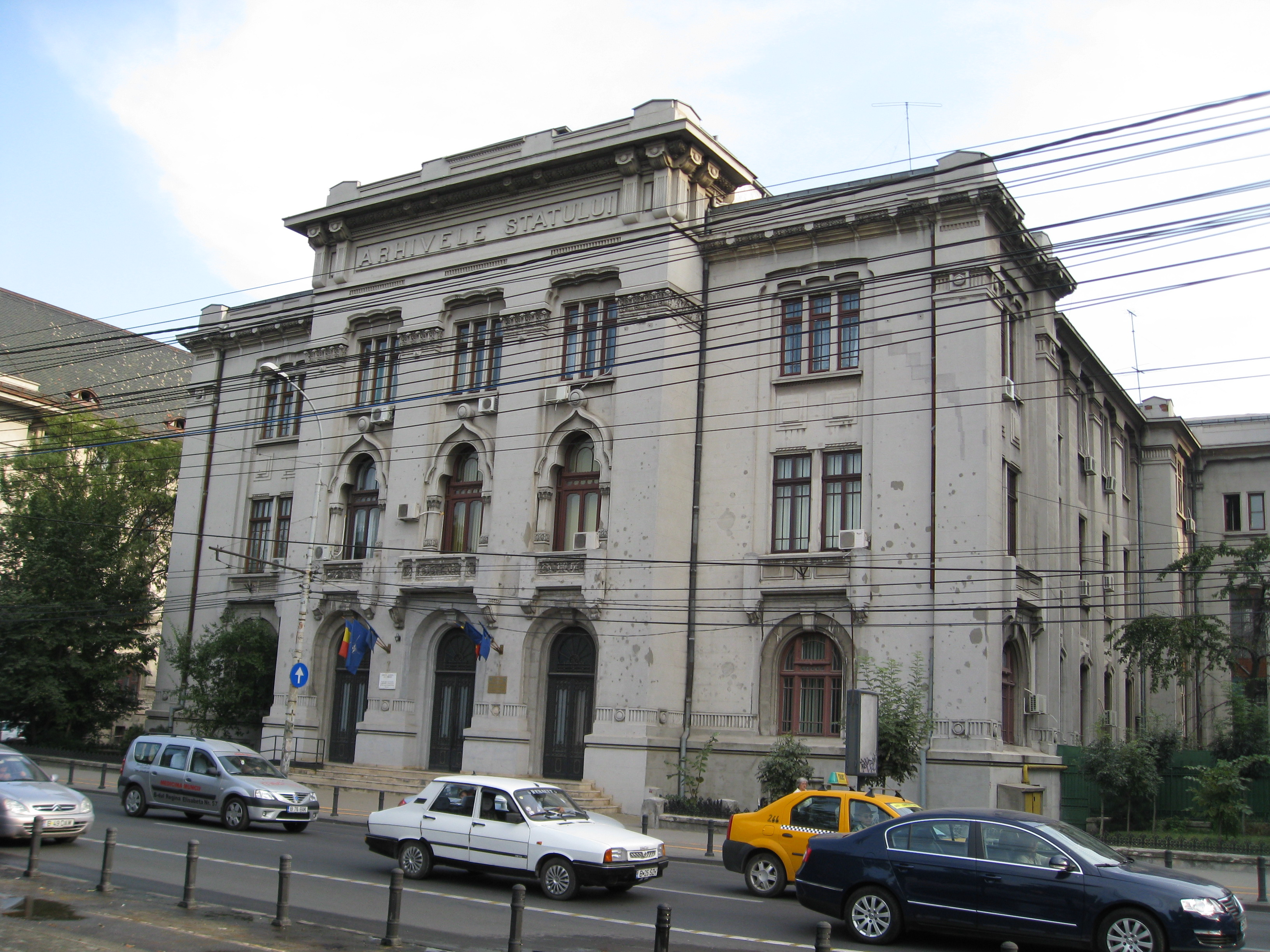
- Bucharest headquarters of the National Archives of Romania, located at 49 Bd. Regina Elisabeta, across the street from Cişmigiu Gardens and adjacent to Bucharest City Hall.
- Interactive map of National Archives of Romania
- 44.434632836688756°N 26.092296847916714°E
- Alternative name: Arhivele Naționale ale României
- Location: 49 Bd. Regina Elisabeta, Bucuresti, Romania
- Website: arhivelenationale.ro/site/

Coat of arms

The National Archives of Romania (Romanian: Arhivele Naţionale ale României), until 1996 the State Archives (Arhivele Statului), are the national archives of Romania, headquartered in Bucharest. It is subordinate to the Ministry of Internal Affairs. There are 42 regional branches, one in each county of Romania and one in Bucharest (holding documents pertaining specifically to the city).

== Attributes ==
By law nr. 16/1996 (modified by law nr.138/2013, in order to update the existing law and comply with EU requirements), the Archives establishes norms for archival activity; Implements measures from the law on archives; receives documents for the National Archival Deposit of Romania; inventories, selects and preserves the documents it holds; preserves documents on microfilm and other formats; maintains an archival database; edits the quarterly Revista Arhivelor and other specialty publications; ensures the training of qualified archivists through the Archival Faculty and the National School for Archival Training; attests whether a certain document forms part of the National Archival Deposit of Romania; authorises the temporary removal from Romania of documents in the Deposit for scientific or cultural purposes; maintains relations with corresponding institutions, applies international conventions in the field and participates in international archivists' congresses and conferences; and assures that documents in the Deposit are protected, both in peace and wartime.

The law defines the National Archival Deposit of Romania as "documents official and private, diplomatic and consular, memoirs, manuscripts, proclamations, summons, announcements, plans, sketches, maps, film prints and similar objects, seals, as well as photo, video, audio and computer recordings, with historic value, produced in Romania or by Romanian creators abroad".

The Archives has been part of the International Council on Archives since 1954; has bilateral agreements with corresponding institutions in France, Germany, Hungary, Bulgaria, the People's Republic of China and other countries; and is part of the European Archives Group and the European Board of National Archivists.

The Bucharest headquarters has two study rooms as well as a microfilm room open weekdays to researchers (over 6,500 or about 30 a day in 2007). Church and family records are often solicited, as well as documents on the history of Communism and on land reform, collectivisation and nationalisation. Documents can also be consulted at the Archives' 42 branches. There is also a library at the headquarters, containing some 70,000 books and 50,000 periodicals, many of them rare and valuable; again, every branch has its own library.

== History ==
At least as early as the 18th century, archives were kept in the Danubian Principalities by the princely chancellery, by church authorities and privately by dignitaries of various ranks in the boyar hierarchy. The oldest places for preserving documents were monasteries, which, being secure, also kept secular documents. For instance, in 1775 the Metropolis of Bucharest is known to have kept a general archive that included private documents such as property delimitations.

The Archives of Wallachia were established on 1 May 1831, and those of Moldavia on 1 January 1832, as the countries' first modern administrative laws, Regulamentul Organic, took effect. At first, these archives were of a rather theoretical nature, as the legislation referred only to their budget and number of personnel, and not to archival activity. This vagueness had an adverse impact, despite the fact that important cultural figures served as directors, including Gheorghe Asachi, Ion Heliade Rădulescu and Grigore Alexandrescu. In 1840, an attempt was made to regulate the sorting and evaluation of archival documents, but it was only in 1862, with the Union of the Principalities, that the Archives were placed under a General Directorate at Bucharest, with the Iaşi archives made subordinate. At that time, a distinction was made between documents with a historical value and a practical one, and the institution was made subordinate to the Ministry of Justice, Religious Affairs and Public Education. This is usually considered the point at which the modern Archives were established; in 1864, following the secularization of monastery estates in Romania, its collections were enriched as the state took over a significant number of documents. Further regulations were enacted in 1869 and 1872; Bogdan Petriceicu Hasdeu served as director from 1876 to 1900, followed by Dimitrie Onciul (1900–23).

In Transylvania, the Hungarian authorities kept their own archives until the Kingdom of Hungary was partitioned following the Battle of Mohács in 1526. After Transylvania entered the Habsburg Empire in 1688, methods of document preservation gradually improved, notably through the introduction of registers at the chief administrative institutions. When the Hungarian State Archives were established in 1875, most of the old Transylvanian archives were moved to Budapest. Thus, at the end of the 19th century, documents pertaining to Transylvania, as well as the Banat and Bukovina, were centralised at the state archives in Budapest (Országos Lévéltár) and Vienna (Haus-, Hof- und Staatsarchiv).

After Romania expanded in 1918 at the end of World War I, State Archives were established in three newly acquired historical regions: at Cluj in 1920 for Transylvania, at Cernăuţi in 1924 for Bukovina and at Chişinău in 1925 for Bessarabia. In 1925, a new law governing the State Archives went into effect and, among other provisions, called for regional directorates to be set up. The institution was subordinated to the Ministry of Public Education. Constantin Moisil was the director from 1923 to 1938, followed by Aurelian Sacerdoțeanu (1938–1953).

In 1951, during the early Communist period, the State Archives Directorate passed under the control of the Ministry of Internal Affairs and the Soviet organisational model was adopted. A new archival law was adopted in 1996, following the regime's collapse. During the 2000s, the Archives has pursued a policy of infrastructure modernisation, including computerisation.

== See also ==
- List of national archives
