= Târgu Jiu =

- Municipality
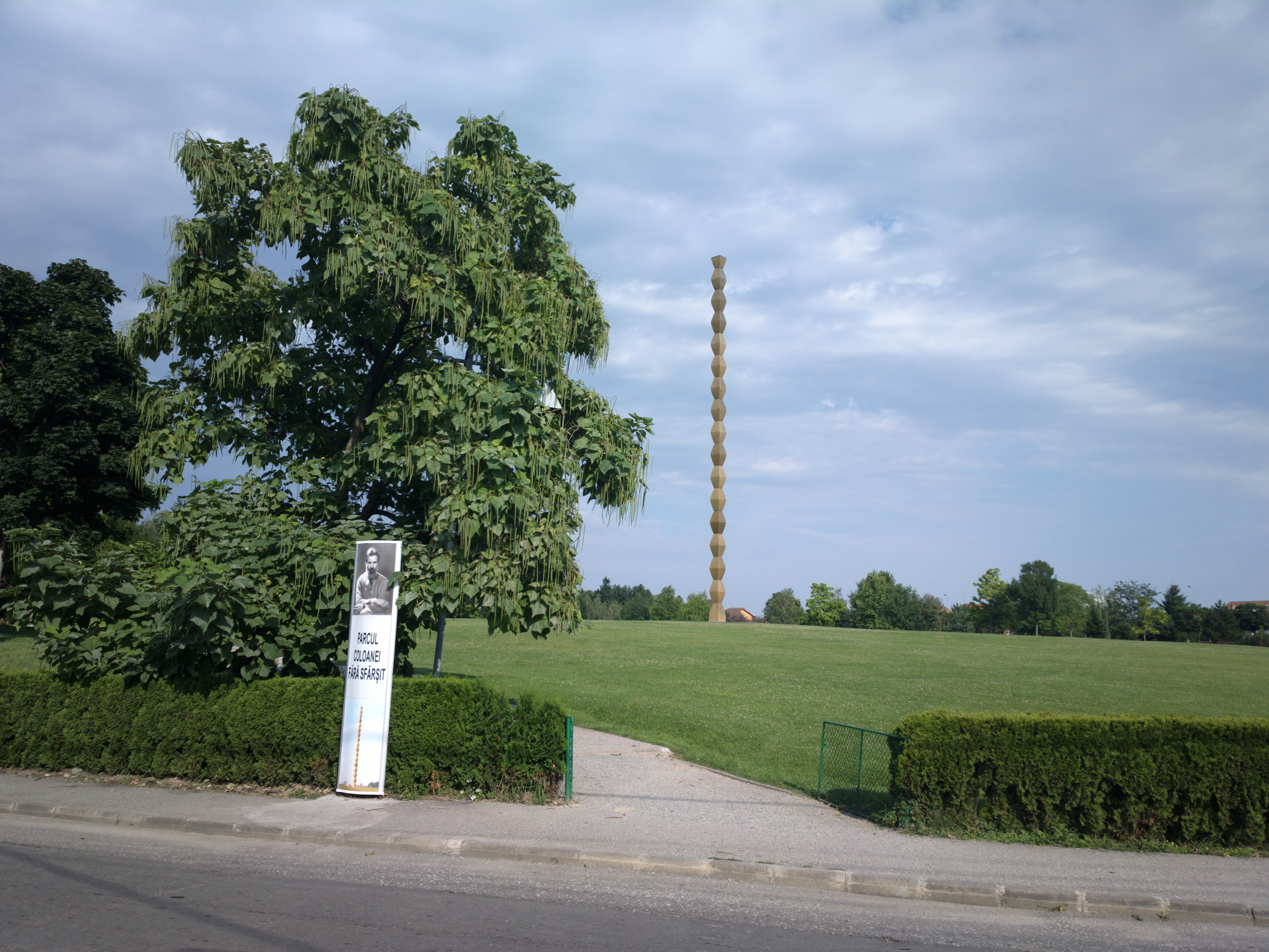
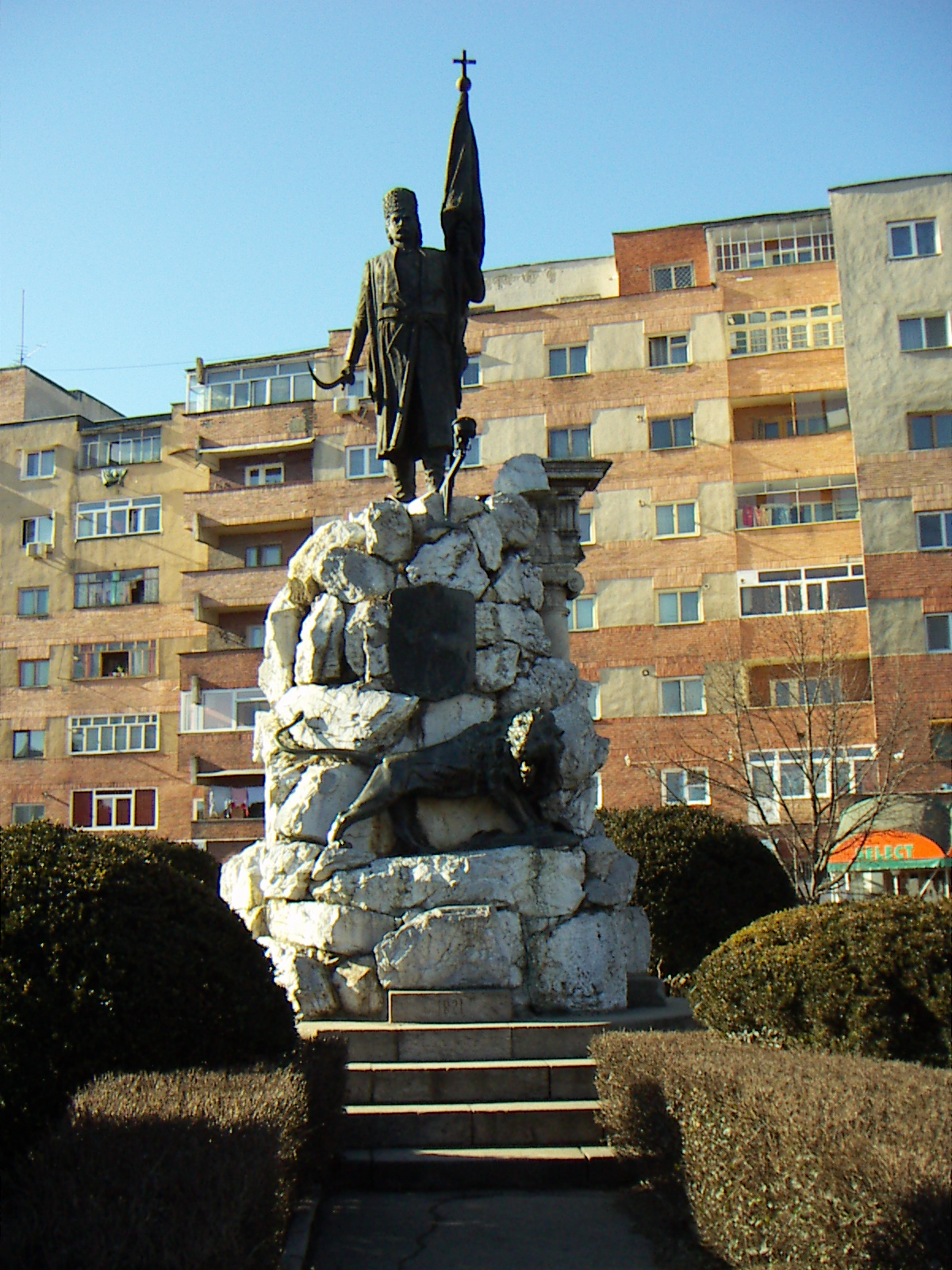
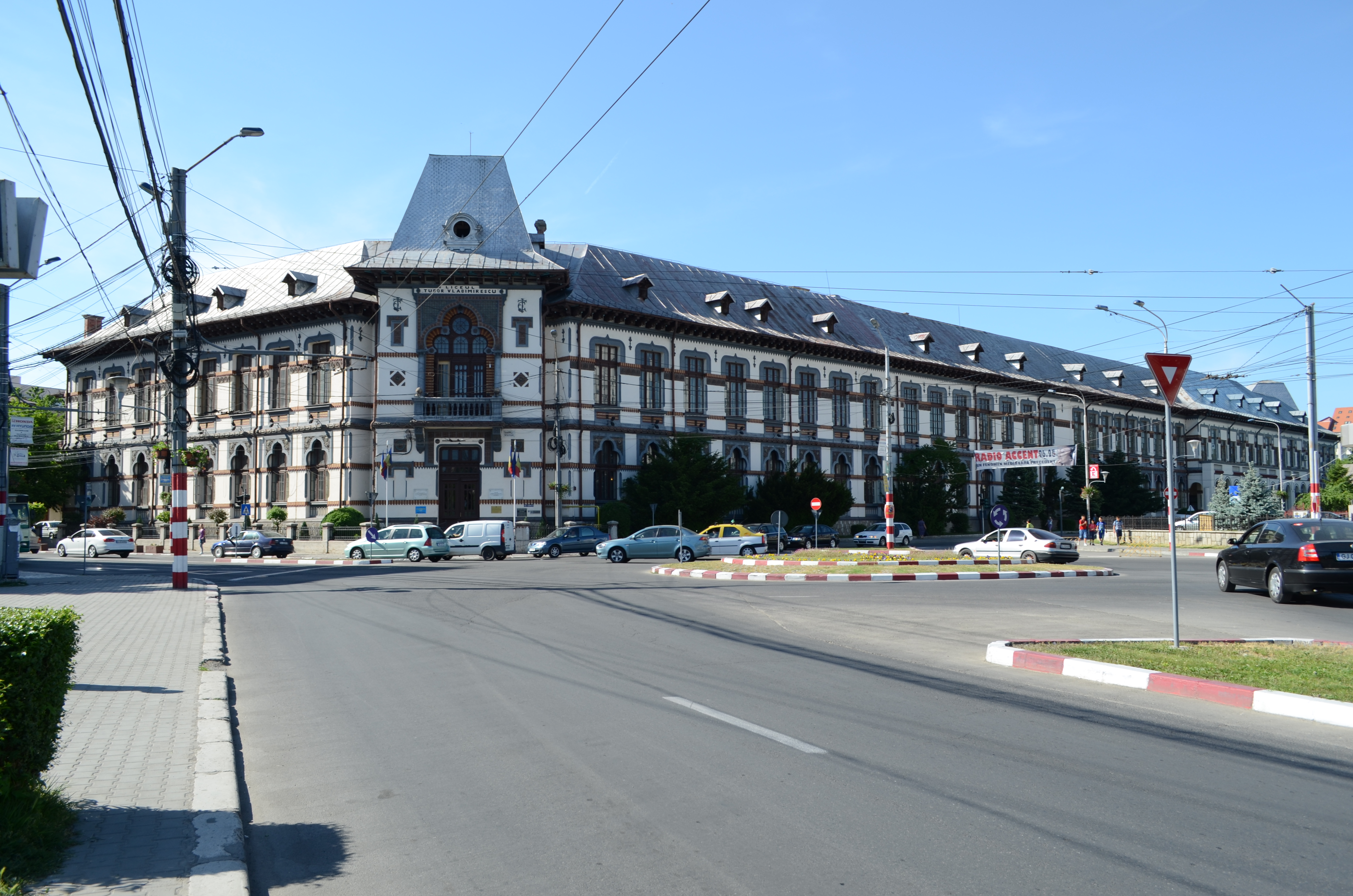
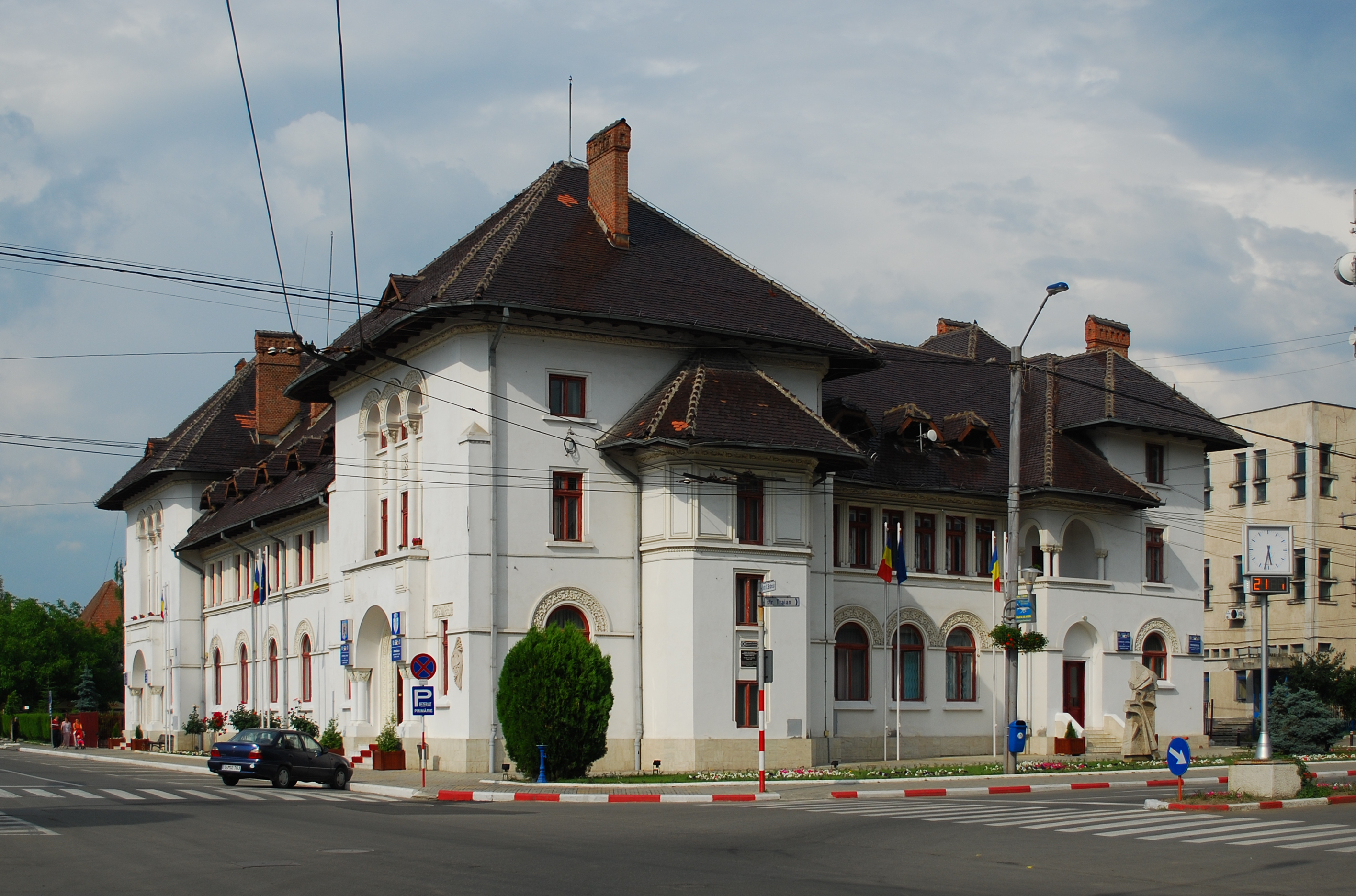
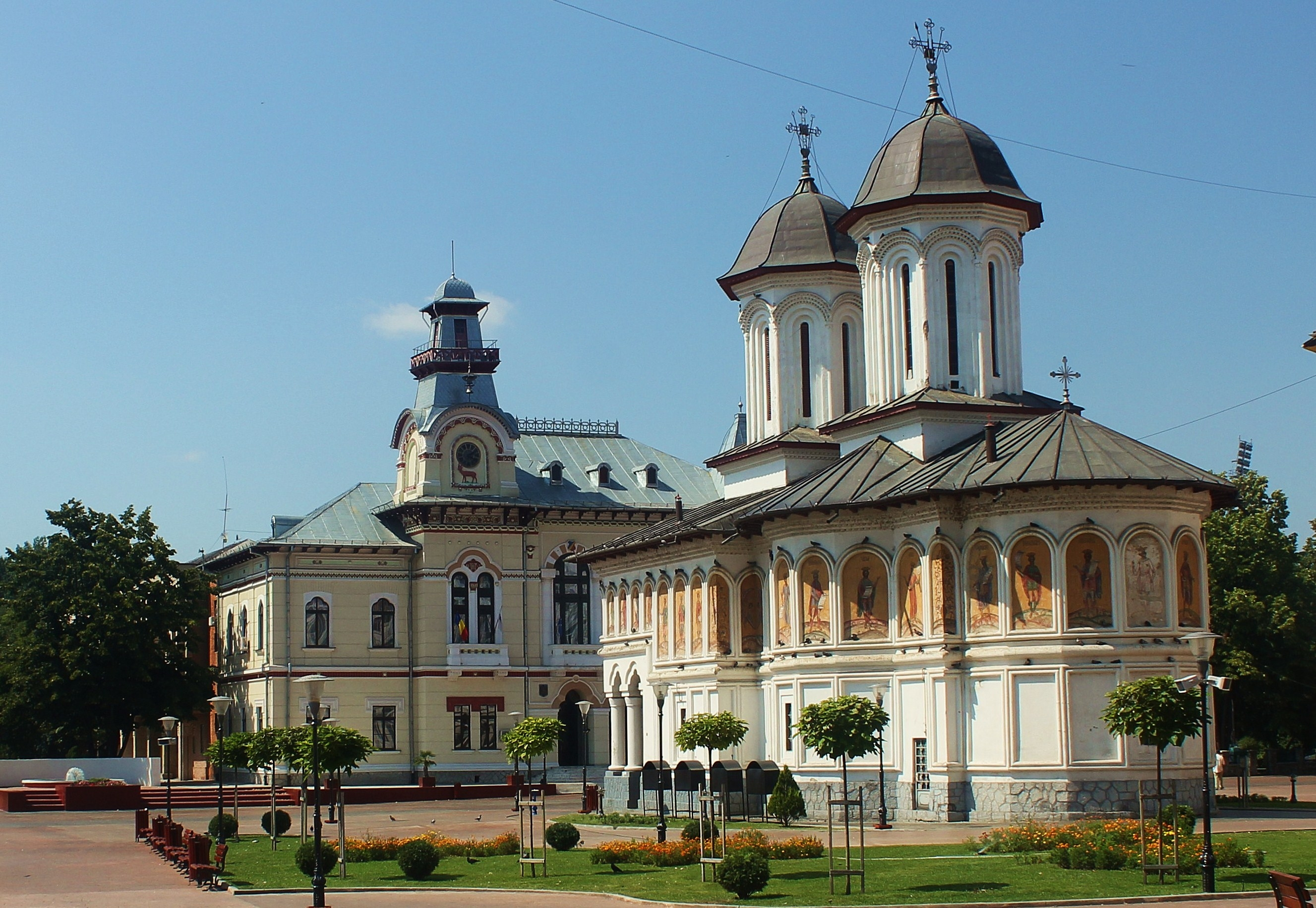
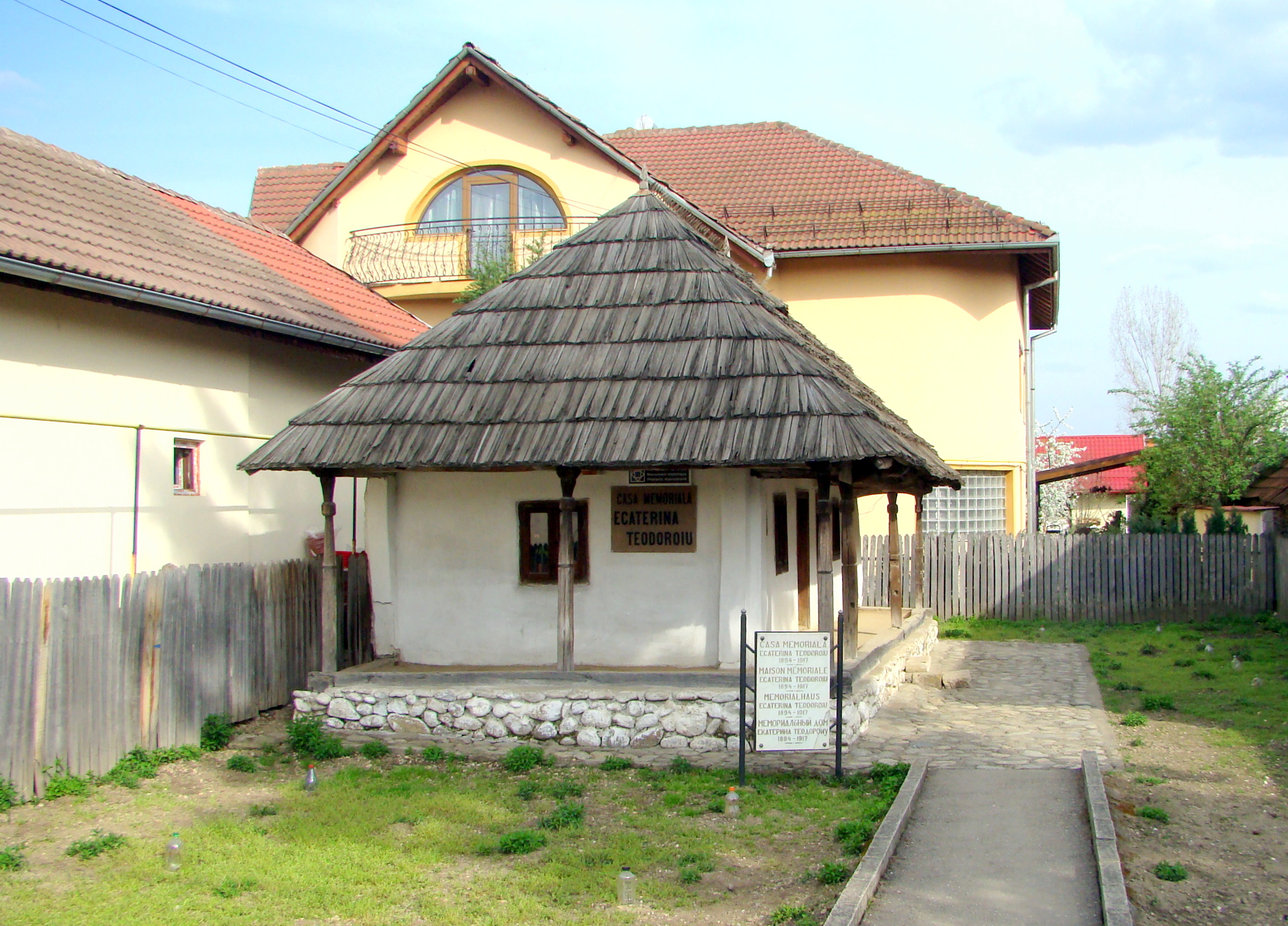
- The Endless Column by Constantin Brâncuși Tudor Vladimirescu monument Tudor Vladimirescu National College City Hall Holy Archangels Church and Gorj County Prefecture Ecaterina Teodoroiu Memorial House City center

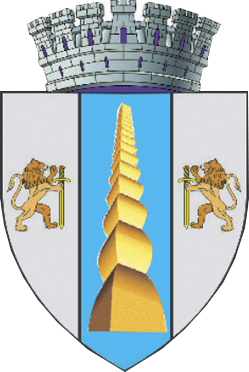
- Coat of arms

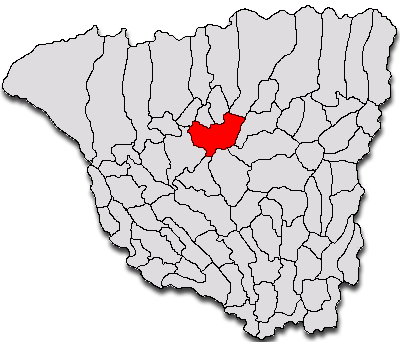
- Location in Gorj County

- Location in Romania
- Coordinates: 45°2′3″N 23°16′29″E
- Country: Romania
- County: Gorj
- Established: 1406 (first official record as Jiul)
- Subdivisions: Bârsești, Drăgoieni, Iezureni, Polata, Preajba Mare, Romanești, Slobozia, Ursați

Government
  - Mayor (2024–2028): Marcel Romanescu (PSD)
- Area: 102 km^{2} (39 sq mi)
- Highest elevation: 326 m (1,070 ft)
- Lowest elevation: 210 m (690 ft)
- Population (2021-12-01): 73,545
  - Density: 721/km^{2} (1,870/sq mi)
- Time zone: UTC+02:00 (EET)
  - Summer (DST): UTC+03:00 (EEST)
- Postal code: 200xyz
- Area code: +40 x53
- Vehicle reg.: GJ
- Website: www.targujiu.ro

Târgu Jiu (Romanian pronunciation: [ˌtɨrɡu ˈʒiw]), is the capital of Gorj County in the Oltenia region of Romania. It is situated on the Southern Sub-Carpathians, on the banks of the river Jiu. Eight localities are administered by the city: Bârsești, Drăgoieni, Iezureni, Polata, Preajba Mare, Romanești, Slobozia, and Ursați.

The city is noted for the Sculptural Ensemble of Constantin Brâncuși, inscribed as a UNESCO World Heritage Site in 2024.

== History ==
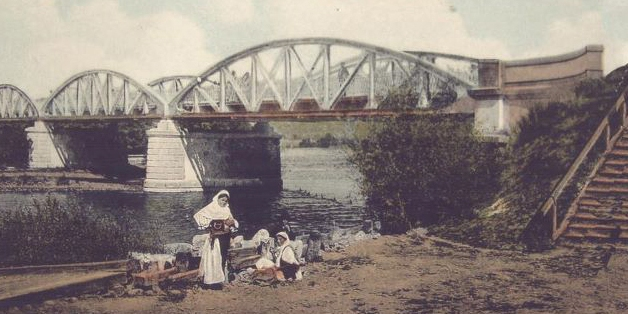
Jiu Bridge at the turn of the 20th century.

The city takes its name from the river Jiu, which runs through it. In antiquity, there was a Dacian village in around the location of today's city surrounded by forests. After the Roman conquests of Oltenia (101–102), military units were stationed around the roads that connected different important routes at the time. During the digging of the Târgu Jiu - Rovinari railroad, mosaics, coins, ceramics and Roman bricks were found in the south-eastern part of the city. This and ancient testimonies support the idea that Târgu Jiu was a commercial town (a vicus) while under the Roman Empire's rule. A very important route that connects the Danube to Transylvania runs through the city, so historians believe that part of the Roman army under Trajan's leadership stayed and then passed in the actual location of the city.

After the 271 withdrawal of the Roman army, the city remained in the Latin influence zone, mainly because of Constantine The Great's involvement in Oltenia which he sought to bring under imperial rule. The importance of keeping this zone under Rome's control was underlined by Constantine's decision to build a second bridge over the Danube between today's Corabia (then Sucidava) and the Bulgarian city of Gigen. It was over 2400 meters long, one of the longest of all time.

This territory was under Litovoi's rule, a Vlach (Romanian) voivode in the 13th century, whose territory comprised northern Oltenia. He is mentioned for the first time in a diploma issued by king Béla IV of Hungary (1235–1270) on 2 July 1247. In 1277 (or between 1277 and 1280), Litovoi was at war with the Hungarians over lands King Ladislaus IV of Hungary (1272–1290) claimed for the crown, but for which Litovoi refused to pay tribute. Litovoi was killed in battle.

The first written account of the city appears in a document dating from 23 November 1406 in an order signed by Mircea cel Batran. Since 1497, the city has been the seat of Gorj County.

Constantin Brâncuși, who had lived here as a boy, was commissioned to contribute to a memorial monument to the fighters of World War I, called Calea Eroilor, "Heroes' Street", which was finished in 1938. His large sculptures are now the main tourist attractions in Târgu Jiu: The Table of Silence, Stool Alley, The Gate of the Kiss, and The Endless Column. The latter is shown in the middle section of the city's coat of arms. In the 1950s the Communist mayor planned to demolish Brâncuși's "bourgeois" art. The plan was not carried out.

The Târgu Jiu internment camp was a detention facility in the northeastern part of the city. It was a regular prison from 1895 to 1939 and again after 1945, but is best known for its role as an internment camp for various categories of individuals during World War II. Internees in 1943–1944 included Gheorghe Gheorghiu-Dej, Chivu Stoica, Mișu Dulgheru, Nicolae Ceaușescu, and Lucrețiu Pătrășcanu.

Starting in the 1960s, coal surface mining contributed to a rapid population growth. Other local industries include wood, machine building, textiles, glassware and construction materials (cement, bricks, and tiles).

In 1992, a university was founded and named after Brâncuși.

== Brâncuși ensemble ==
Mihai Radu, a Romanian architect based in New York, described Târgu Jiu's downtown - rebuilt during the Communist era - as little more than "a mix of poorly maintained paving, disheveled mass housing, jumbled signage and buildings of every size and description". The overall cityscape is "mundane, but vibrant and no doubt livable", with "often dissonant" street pattern and urban fabric. Representing the interior space of Brâncuși's ensemble, the Calea Eroilor - otherwise an unprepossessing, uninspiring and "unacceptably vernacular" street - defines through his sculptures the town's civic areas in the same manner as the Great Axis of Paris.

Brâncuși's work in Târgu Jiu is "absolutely revolutionary": the sculptures exist at the same time as conventional public art with multiple meanings and as functional structures (seats, gateway, monumental marker). Most importantly for Târgu Jiu's urban design, they shape a larger urban structure, being spatially integrated with the town's urbanism in a dramatic and fundamental way. One's progression through the entire ensemble is a spatial experience rare in any modern day city. The sculptures peacefully coexist with and transcend their mundane context. Through Brâncuși's work, East and West come together in Târgu Jiu in a "completely unique" way. The town's imperfections reinforce his ensemble's place in the "messy" cityscape and its history. Juxtaposed against the city's messy urbanism, Brâncuși's ensemble is pluralist urbanism in its finest form. Civic in every way, his ensemble is closely integrated with Târgu Jiu's everyday life. A small-town Romanian fabric merged with a sculptural ensemble of world significance makes Târgu Jiu's plural urbanism astonishing.

== Coat of arms ==
The coat of arms of Târgu Jiu consists of a shield with seven towers. In the centre of the shield lies the representation of Constantin Brâncuși's Endless Column, a symbol of Romanian art and culture. In the right and left sides of the shield lies a golden lion holding a black sword, "guarding" the column. The lion is the ancient symbol of Oltenia, thought to originate in the logo of one of Rome's legion stations in this area, the 13th Legion "Gemina (Legio XIII Gemina)". It represents the bravery and combative spirit of the city's inhabitants.

== Population ==
Historical population
Year	Pop.	±%
1889	4,076	—
1900	6,634	+62.8%
1912	9,763	+47.2%
1930	13,030	+33.5%
1940	26,634	+104.4%
1948	17,698	−33.6%
1956	19,618	+10.8%
1966	30,805	+57.0%
1977	63,651	+106.6%
1992	98,238	+54.3%
2002	96,641	−1.6%
2011	80,548	−16.7%
2021	73,545	−8.7%
Source: INS, Census data

At the 2021 census, the city had a population of 73,545. At the 2011 census, 78,553 inhabitants lived within the city limits; of those, 75,640 (96,29%) were Romanians, 2,683 (3,41%) were Romani people, and 0,20% others.

== Transport ==
- The public transport system of Târgu Jiu consists of 2 trolleybus lines and 8 bus lines. It is operated by S.C. Transloc. S.A. A ticket for one trip costs around €0.60, as of 2023.
- The main railway station is situated on Republicii Boulevard. It was reconstructed after the 1989 Romanian Revolution.
- The city's road network consists of five boulevards (Blvd. Constantin Brâncuși, Blvd. Nicolae Titulescu, Blvd. Republicii, Blvd. Ecaterina Teodoroiu, Blvd. Unirii). The main street of the city is Calea Victoriei (Victory Avenue). The largest boulevard in Târgu Jiu is Ecaterina Teodoroiu Boulevard.
- Târgu Jiu is crossed by many important roads, such as European route E79 and national road DN67, which connects it to Drobeta-Turnu Severin to the west and Râmnicu Vâlcea to the east.

== Gallery ==
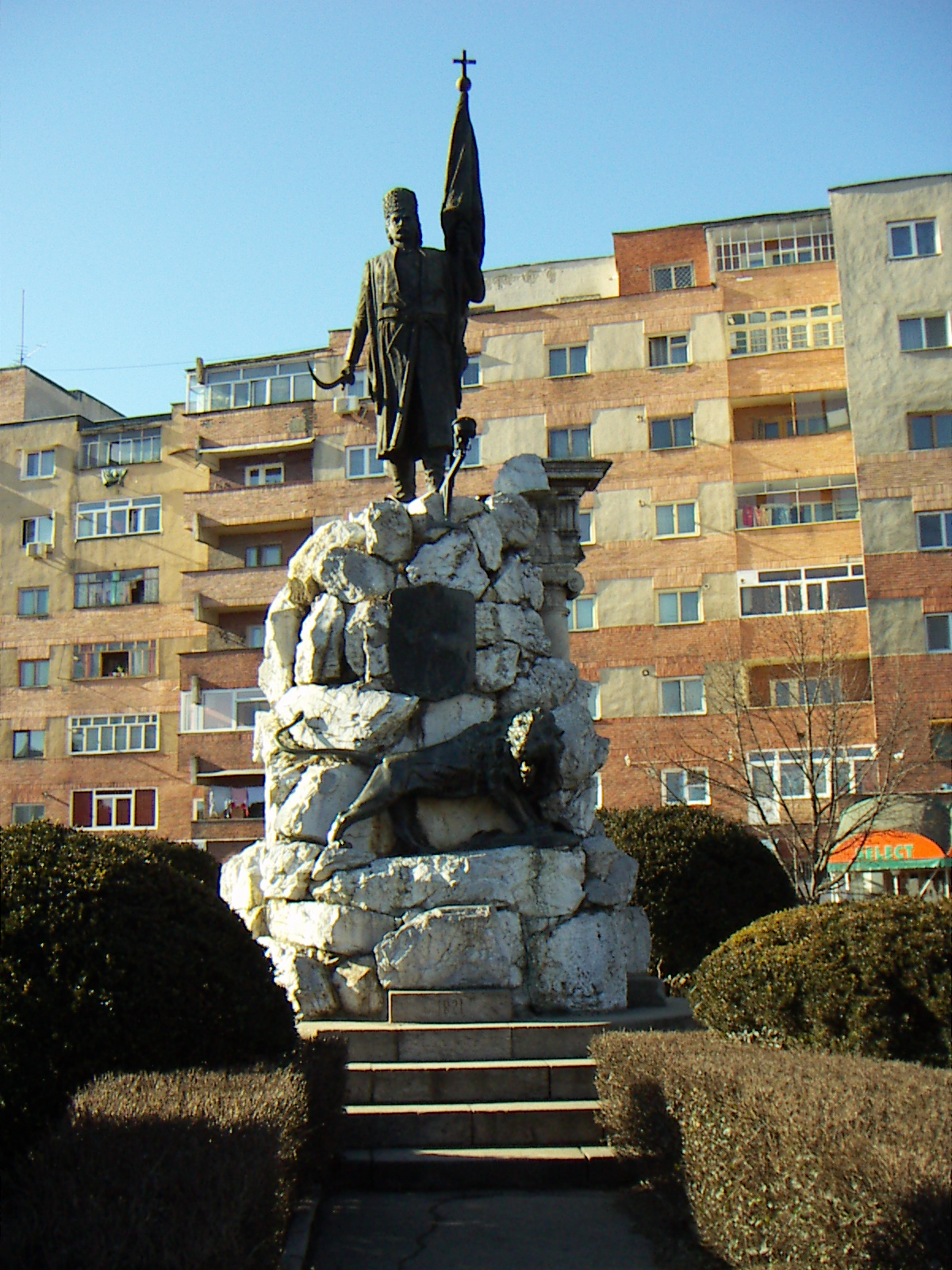
Tudor Vladimirescu monument

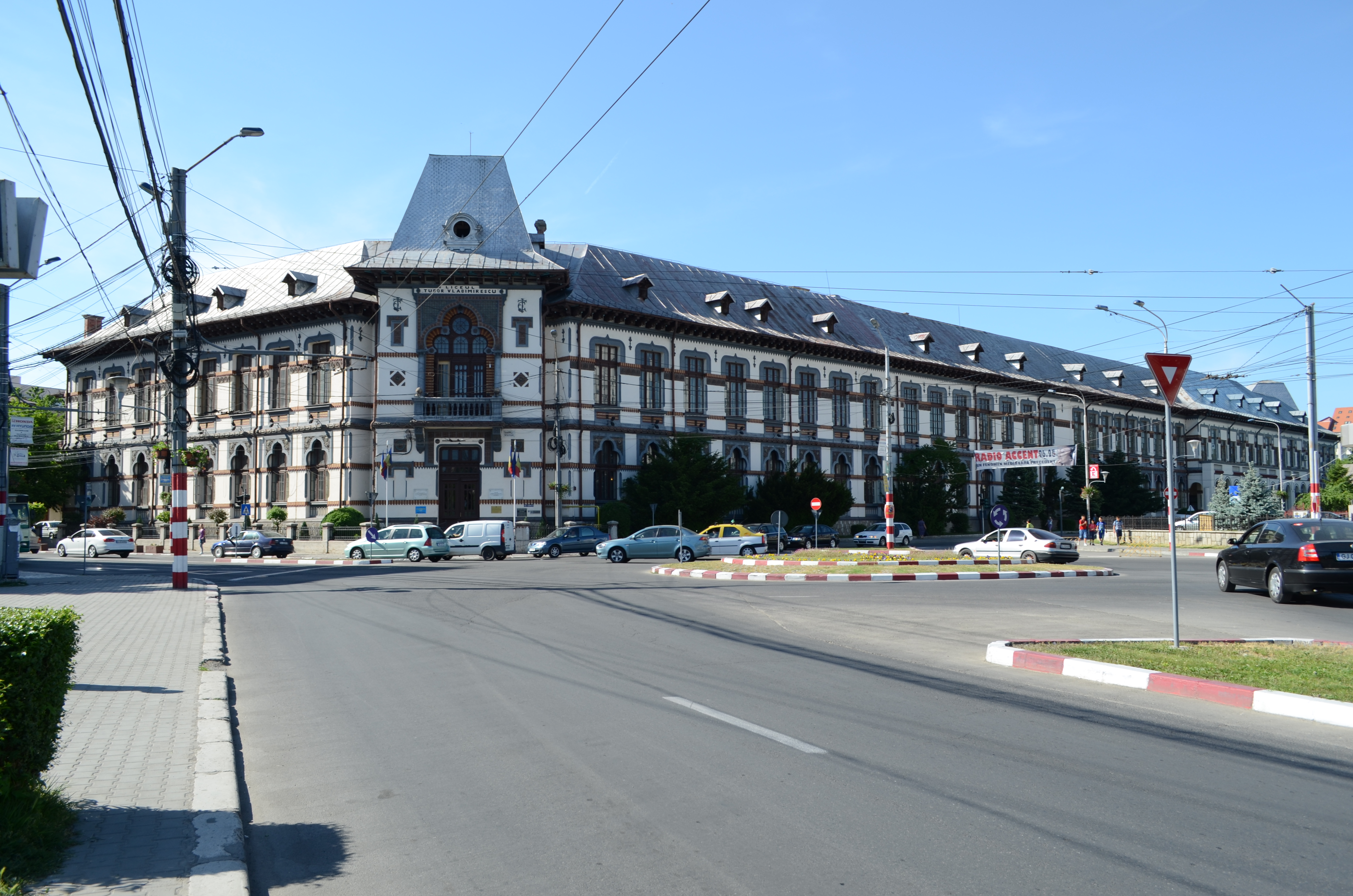
Tudor Vladimirescu National College

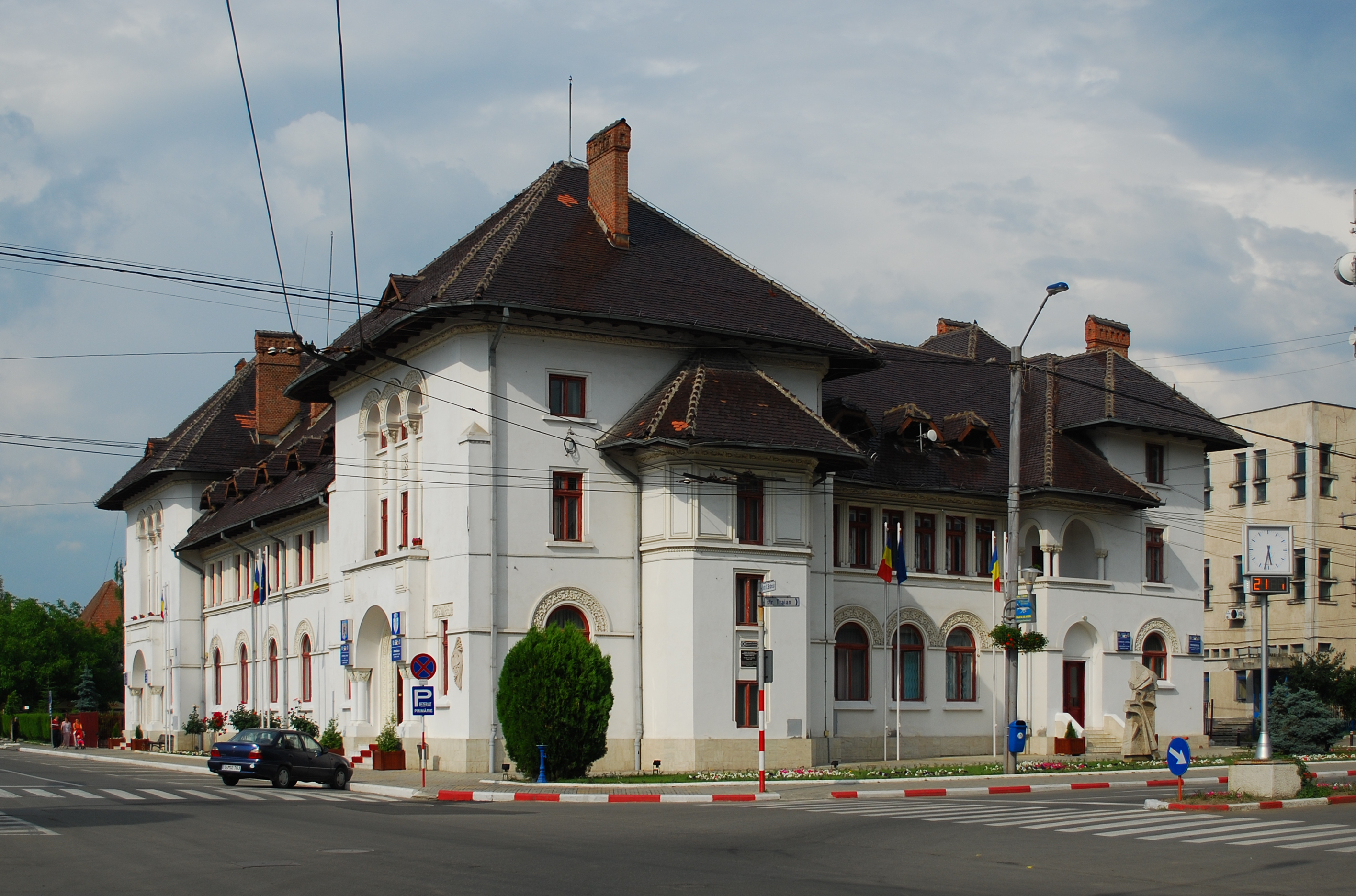
City Hall

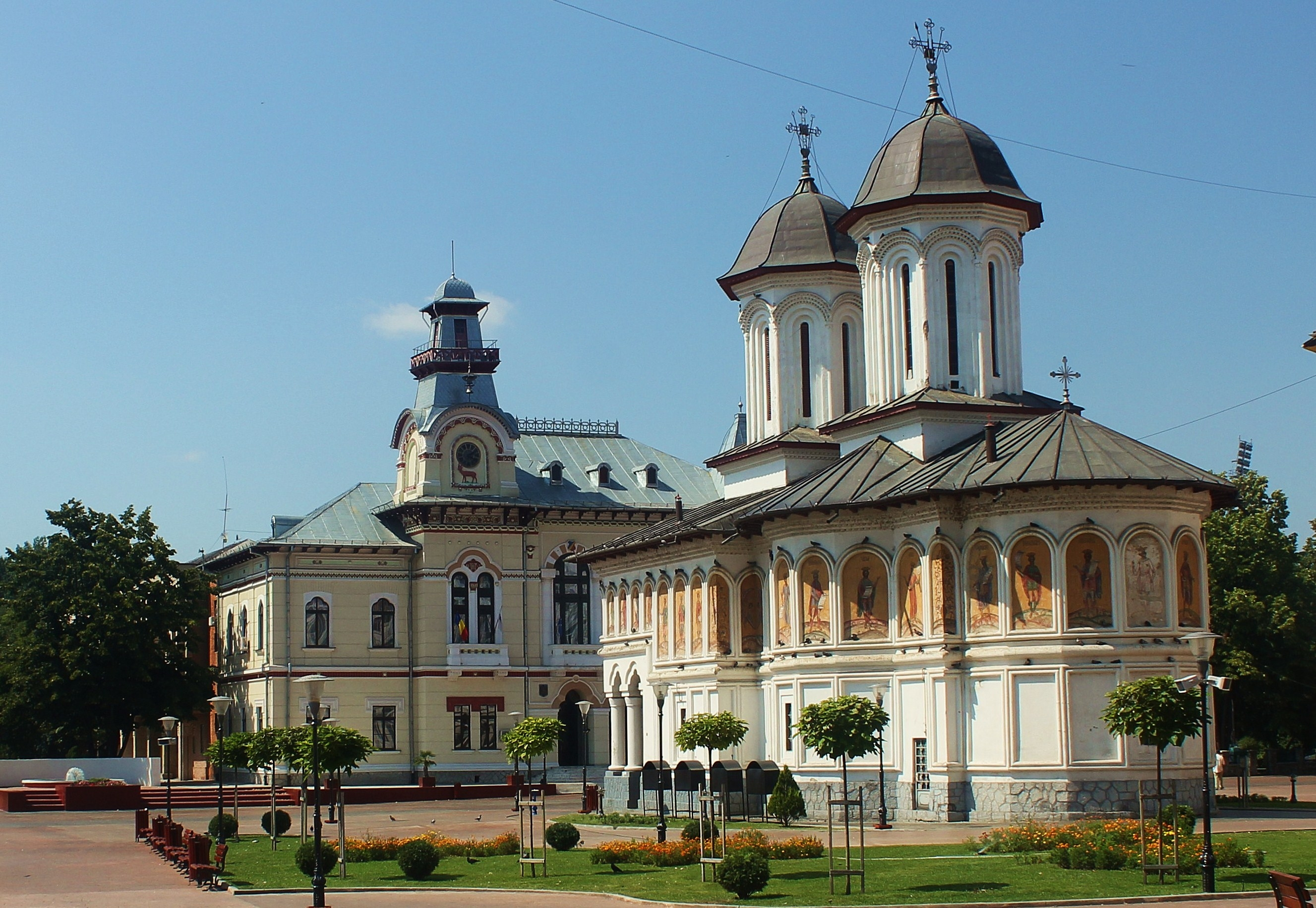
Holy Archangels Church and Gorj County Prefecture

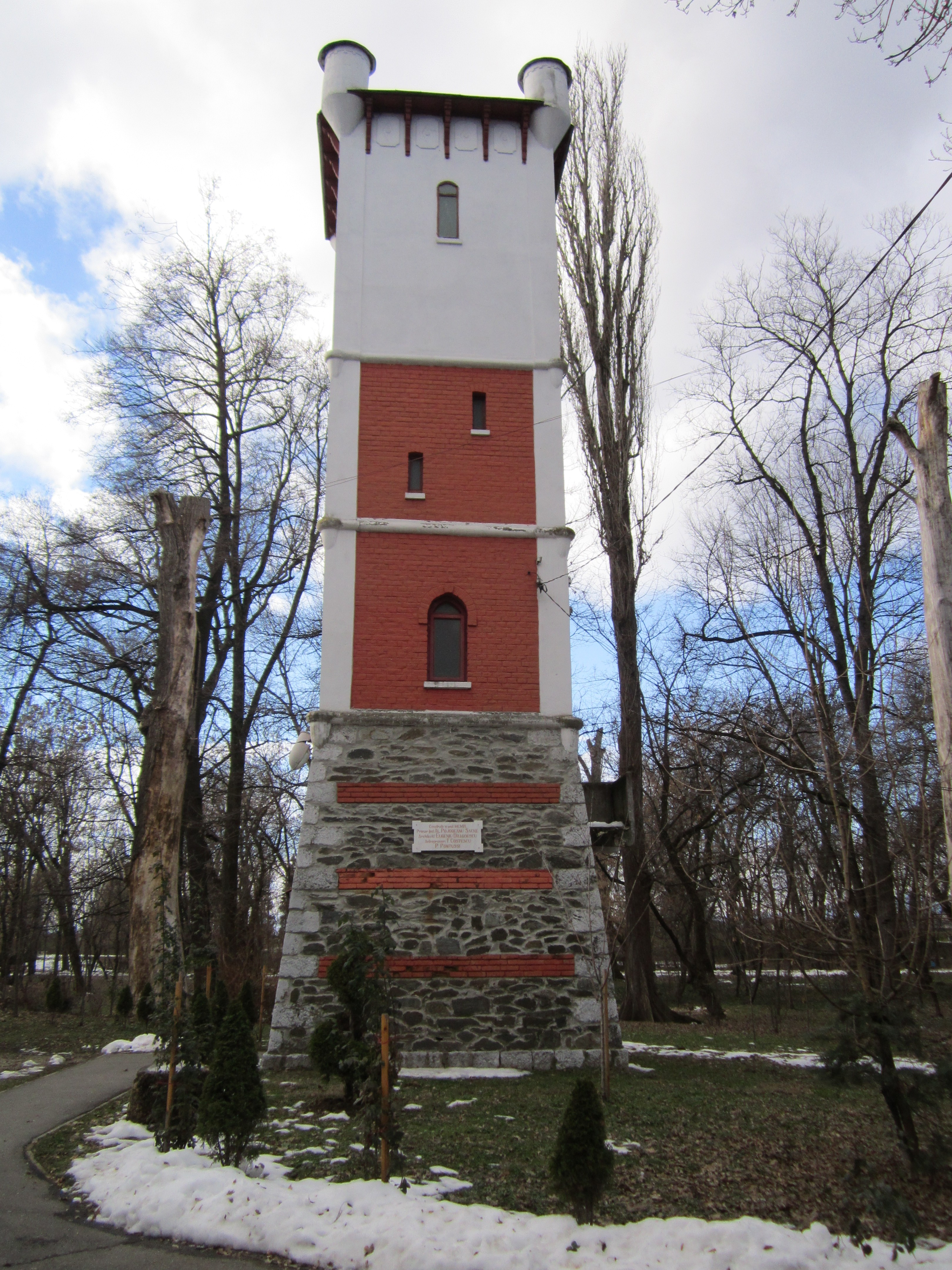
Central Park

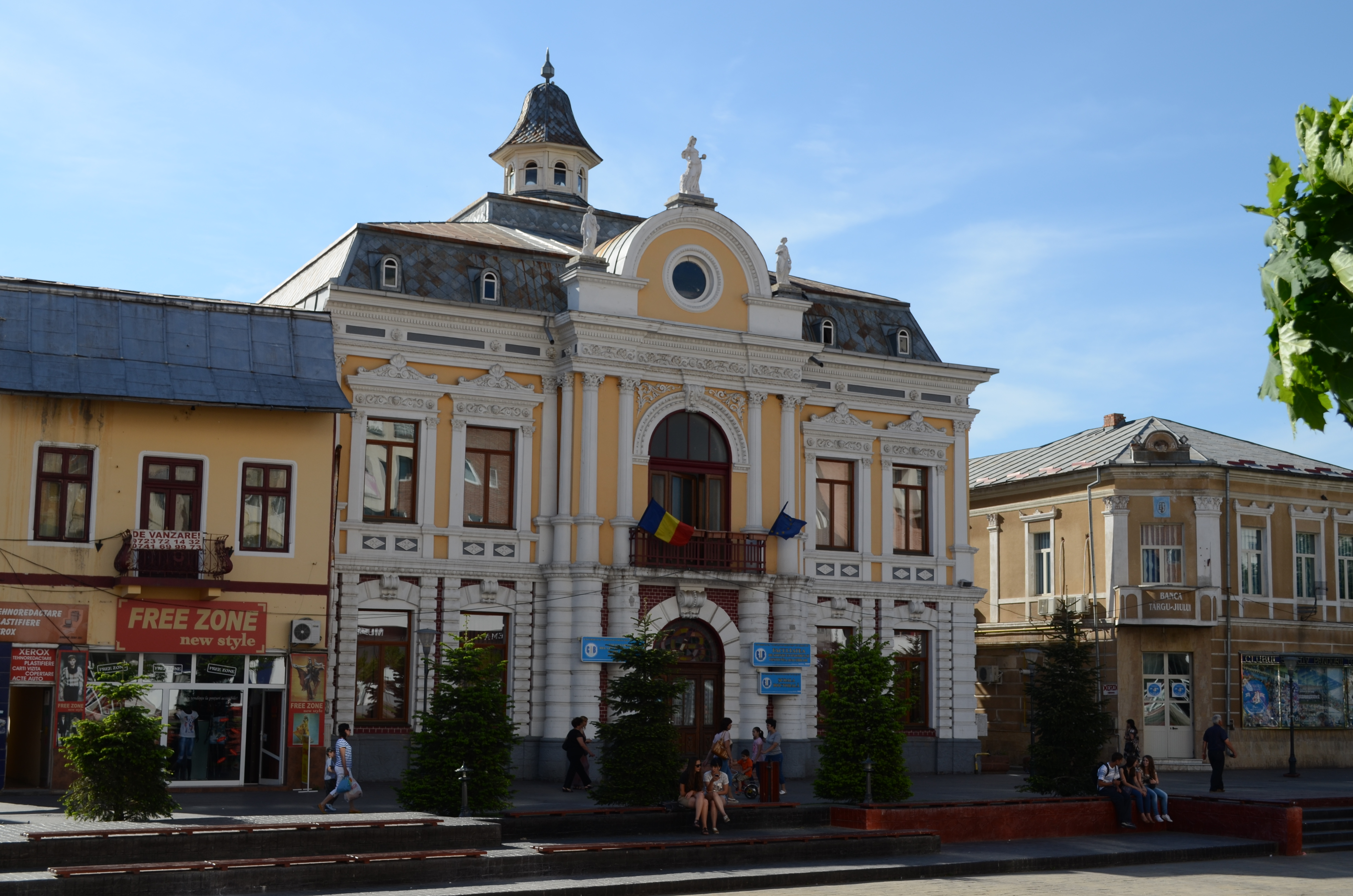
Palace of Finance, today Constantin Brâncuși University

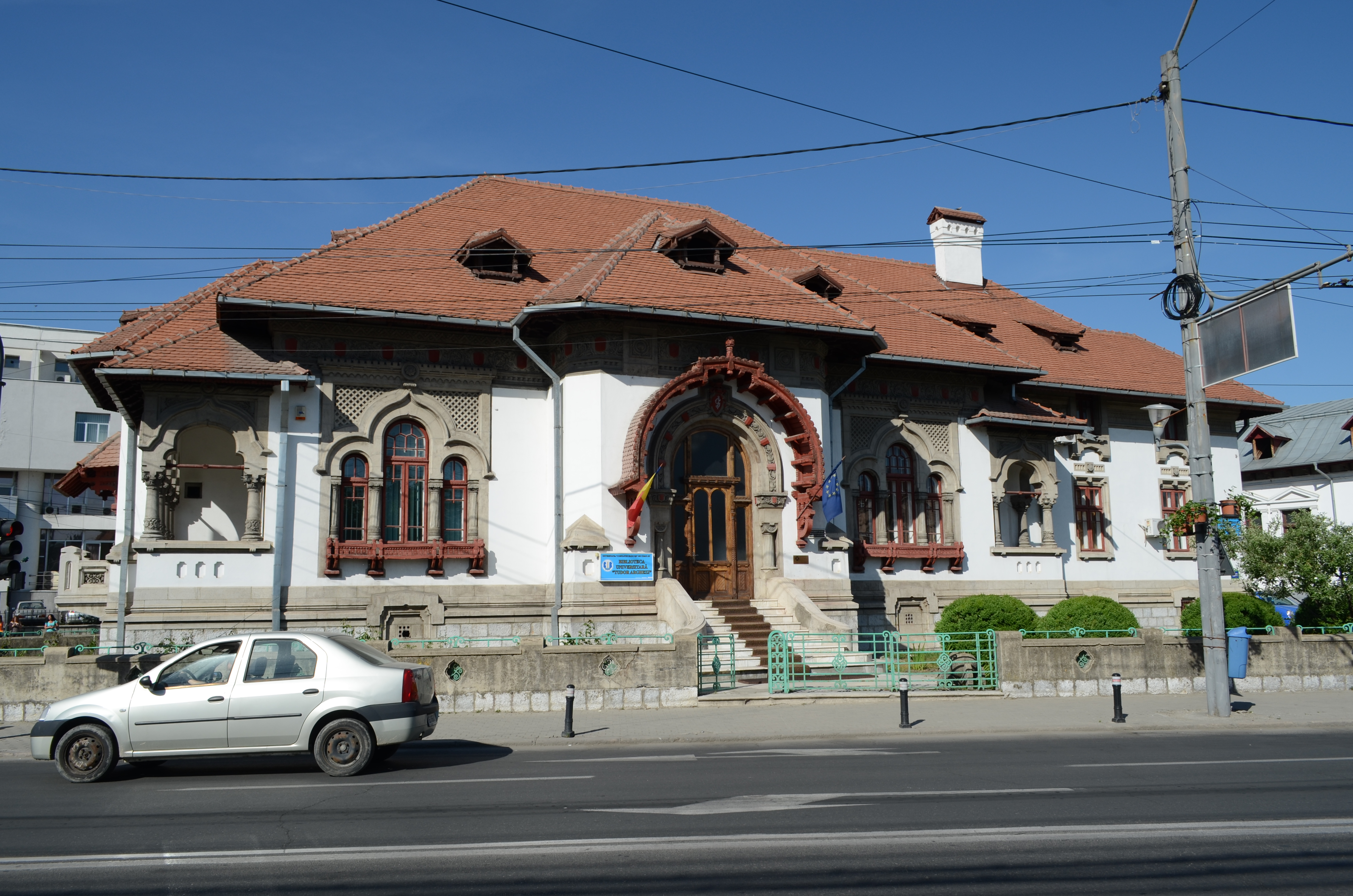
Tudor Arghezi Library

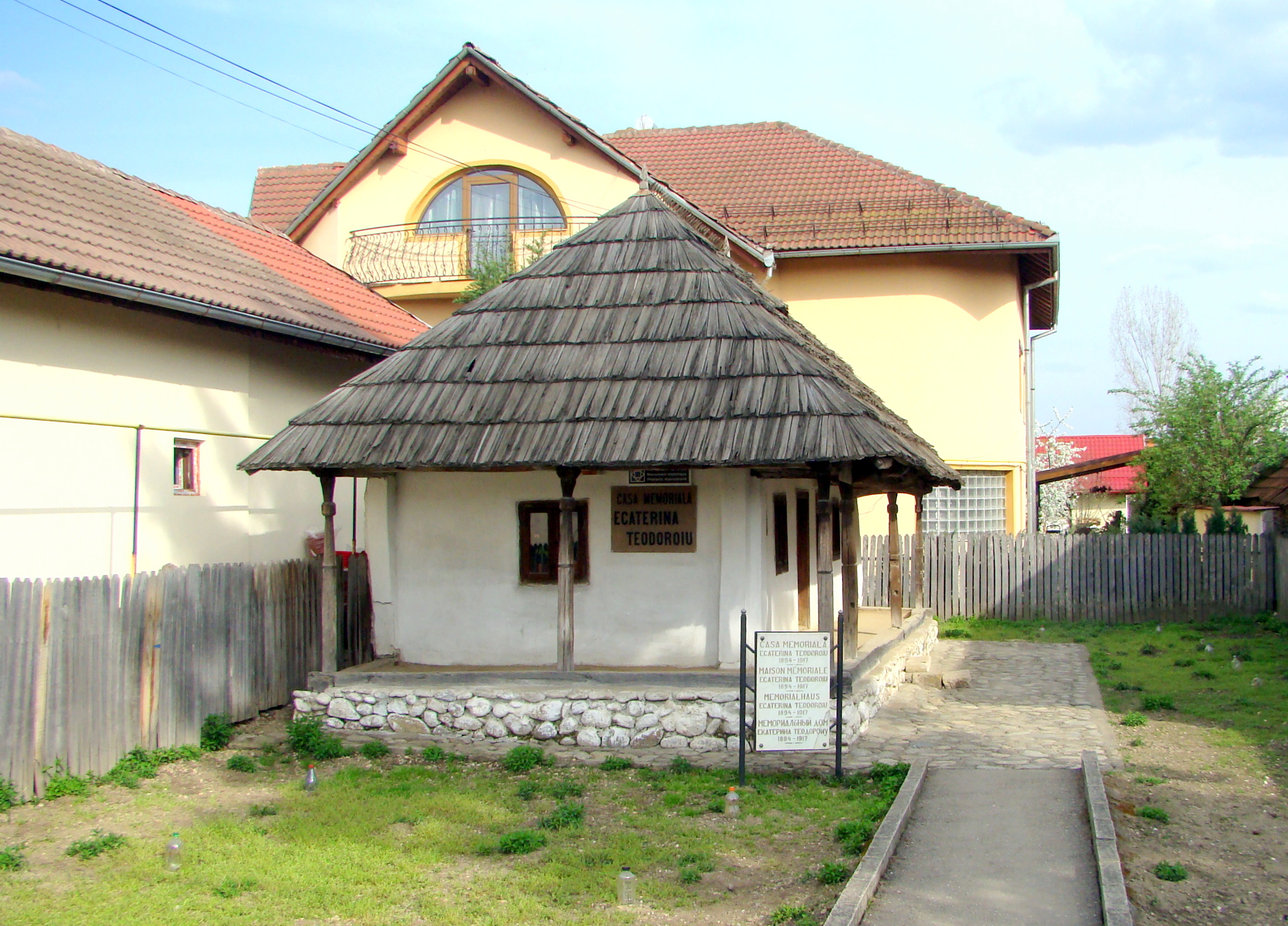
Ecaterina Teodoroiu Memorial House

== Education ==
The main high schools in the city are:

- National College "Ecaterina Teodoroiu"
- Tudor Vladimirescu National College
- School of Fine Arts Constantin Brăiloiu
- National College "Spiru Haret"
- Colegiul Comercial "Virgil Madgearu"
- Colegiul Tehnic "General Gheorghe Magheru"
- Scholar Group Energetic Nr. 1"

There is one university in Târgu Jiu:

- Constantin Brâncuși University

== Sports ==
The main football team of the city is Pandurii. They have spent 12 seasons in the country's top league, Liga I. Their best result was achieved in the 2012–13 season, when they came in second. Pandurii has qualified for European competitions on two occasions, and reached the group stages of the 2013–14 UEFA Europa League.

Also, the city has one basketball team in Liga Națională, CSM Târgu Jiu and two handball team, UCB Târgu Jiu in Divizia A, at male's and CSM Târgu Jiu, at female's in Liga Florilor .

== Twin cities ==
Târgu Jiu is twinned with the following cities:

- Forbach, France
- Lauchhammer, Germany
- Noci, Italy
- Pendik, Turkey
- Yambol, Bulgaria

== Notable figures ==
- Ioan Bengliu (1881–1940), lieutenant general
- Radu Budișteanu (1902–1991), lawyer and activist of the Iron Guard
- Nicolae Cambrea (1899–1976), brigadier general in World War II
- Radu Dan Constantinescu (born 1955), physicist
- Ioan Culcer (1853–1928), major general in World War I
- Adrian Ioana (born 1981), mathematician
- Grigore Iunian (1882–1939), politician
- Mihail Lascăr (1889–1959), general in World War II
- Horațiu Mălăele (born 1952), actor
- Vasile Martinoiu (born 1934), opera singer
- Cătălin Măruță (born 1978), TV host
- Sergiu Nicolaescu (1930–2013), film director, actor, and politician
- Constantin Petrovicescu (1883–1949), brigadier general and Prime Minister (1940–1941)
- Gheorghe Tătărescu (1886–1957), lawyer and Prime Minister (1934–1937; 1939–1940)
- Ecaterina Teodoroiu (1894–1917), World War I heroine
- Emil Ungureanu (1936–2012), chess International Master
- Mircea Veroiu (1941–1997), film director and screenwriter

== See also ==
- Lake Ceauru (project)
