= Dobridor =

Dobridor could refer to:

- Dobridor, a village in Moțăței Commune, Dolj County, Romania
- Ilariu Dobridor (1908–1968), Romanian writer
