= Frații Buzești National College =

- Colegiul Național "Frații Buzești"
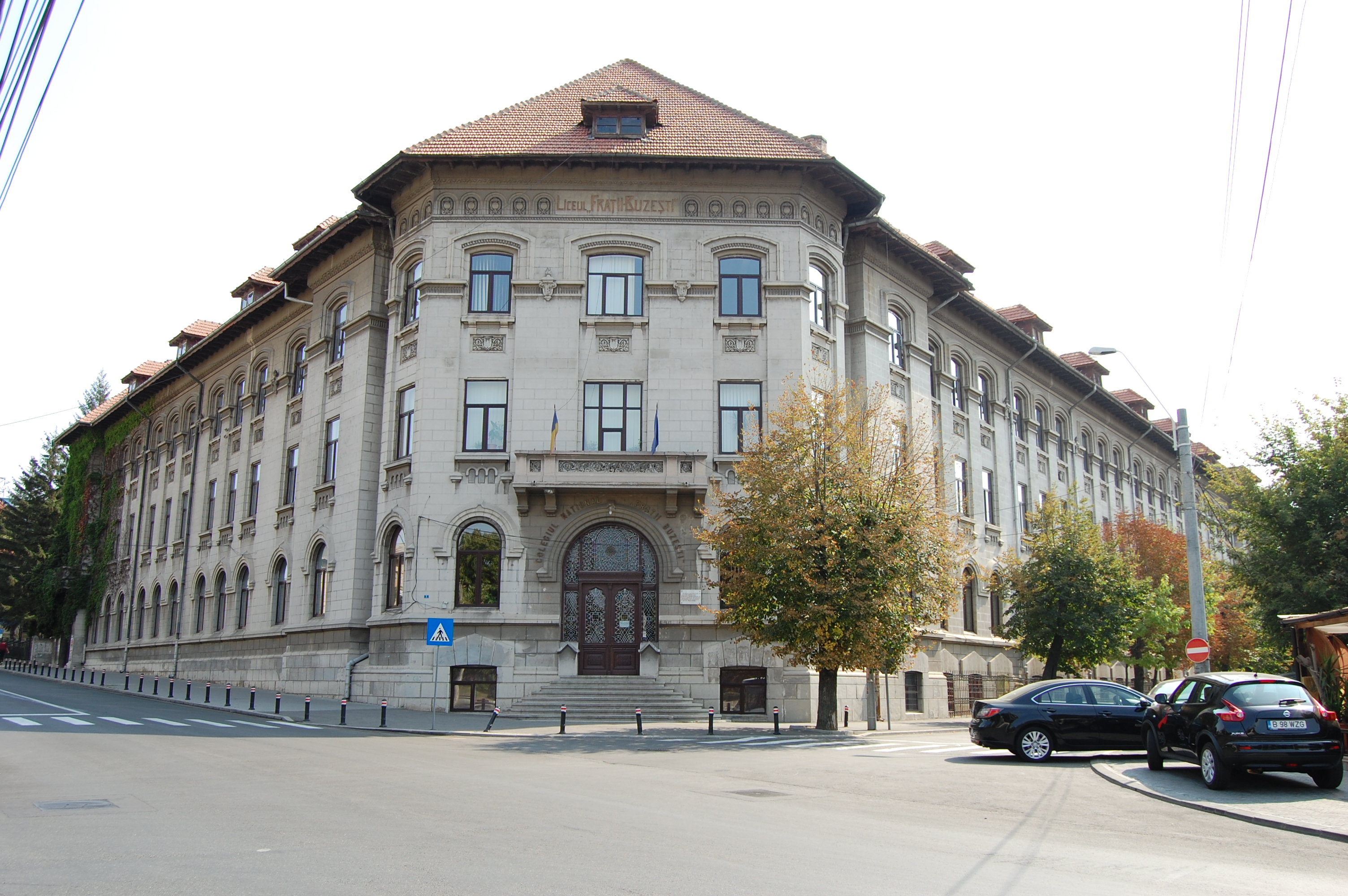

Location
- Bulevardul Știrbei Vodă 5, Craiova, Dolj County; Romania; 44.31347072574013°N 23.793976814087557°E

Information
- Type: Public
- Motto: Aici se învaţă carte
- Established: 1882
- Headmaster: Ileana Didu
- Enrollment: 1,900
- Campus: Urban
- Nickname: CNFB
- Website: www.cnfb.ro

The Frații Buzești National College (Romanian: Colegiul Național "Frații Buzești") is a high school located in central Craiova, Romania, at 5 Știrbei Vodă Street. It is one of the most prestigious secondary education institutions in Romania.

== History ==
The high school was named after three loyal noblemen, the Buzești brothers, Preda, Radu, and Stroe Buzescu, who were the inseparable, strongest military supporters of voivode Michael the Brave; their noble blood line goes back to 1461 AD. Between 1590 and 1600 they fought valiantly, numerous times in the army of the Christian Prince Michael the Brave against the Ottoman Turks.

As a high school it was formally established in 1882 as "Gimnaziul Real" by an edict of "Ministerul Cultelor" (approved by Petre S. Aurelian, the Minister of Culture at the time), with a predominantly science teaching for boys. The gymnasium motto consists of the two Latin words from the beginning of the Book of Genesis: Fiat Lux (Let There Be Light!).

The first director of the gymnasium was Mathematics Professor Grigore Căzănescu, who provided leadership and guidance to both students and professors at the gymnasium. At its opening on November 1, 1882, the gymnasium had 62 students enrolled in the first grade; it opened in the large classroom of the gymnasium for boys in the building that is now Carol I National College, and its first language teachers were Ștefan Rudeanu for French and Ferdinand Settelin for German. By 1898, there were 184 alumni of the gymnasium, but the school did not have its own building until 1930. On January 9, 1910, however, Spiru Haret — then Minister of Education and Culture ("Ministerul Instrucțiunii și Cultelor") — announced that he approved the gymnasium to be called by the name of "Frații Buzești". At that time, one of its best-known teachers was Nicolae Bănescu, professor of history and French language, who became Vice-President of the Romanian Academy. Its study programme was quite strict and severe, and had as many as 34 hours of study per week; it continued much in the same vein even in the early 1960s. By 1961 it also included compulsory, practical training in Electrotechnics engineering at the local works of "ElectroPower" factory for manufacturing electrical train Diesels, with all graduating students receiving certificates for building electrical motors and generators. The school's two rigidly disciplinarian teachers in the 1960s were Sică-Anastasie Petrescu for Mathematics, and Teodoreanu — an elderly Russian Bessarabean — for Physics.

However, the most remarkable headmaster in the entire history of the school was — between 1920 and 1940 — the professor of natural sciences Ion P. Ionescu-Argetoaia, with a doctorate in Geology, who gave up a professorship at the University of Timișoara, as well as an assistant professorship at the Sorbonne, in Paris, in order to join "Frații Buzești" as its leader; he was the first to succeed in securing the approval by the Ministry of Education ("Ministerul Instrucțiunii") for the construction of the monumental building of the high school that continues to be used today. During World War II, between 1941 and 1942, the school's building was used by the German troops as a hospital for wounded German soldiers, and later, between September 1944 and 1949, it was used again—this time by the occupying soviet troops—as a hospital for the wounded Red Army soldiers; during such trying times, the school was forced to operate grossly overcrowded in the buildings of other schools in Craiova. By the year 2005 there were over 15,000 high school graduates of CNFB, its popularity having increased a lot after the 1930s.

Currently, CNFB is a UNESCO-affiliated institution, endowed with quality teaching staff, past and present. CNFB's alumni are presently studying and contributing to research and culture at academic institutions throughout the world.

For over a century, two National Colleges of Craiova, "Frații Buzești" and Carol I National College, have provided educational paths for the inhabitants of Oltenia (especially Dolj County) towards university education; many alumni of these two high schools were admitted through entrance examinations to either the University of Bucharest or the local University of Craiova, with the latter located less than two miles from the buildings of the two high schools.

== Headmasters ==
- Director: Ileana Didu
- Adjunct Directors:
  - Carmen Ștefănescu
  - Ion Nanu
- Councillor for educational programmes and projects: Ileana Didu

== Students' activities ==
- CNFB students involve themselves into a large number of scientific and cultural activities organized by the students clubs and/or the Frații Buzești Foundation. There is also a students' magazine and journal published by the school since 1996. (The first students' magazine was however founded in 1963, and then it was promptly censored and suspended by the school's principal, with the student editor being punished).

== Alumni ==
- Sabin Bălașa (1932–2008), painter
- Ilariu Dobridor (1908–1968), writer and politician
- Mihnea Gheorghiu (1919–2011), poet, titular member of the Romanian Academy
- Mircea Grigore (1920–2006), elder son of King Carol II of Romania.
- Eugeniu Petre P. Mareṣ (1907–1995), Lt. General, physician.
- Alexandru Mitru (1914–1989), prolific writer of legends and mythological stories
- Ilie G. Murgulescu (1902–1991), physical chemist, former President of the Romanian Academy
- Petre C. Raicu (1929–1998), former professor of genetics at the University of Bucharest and Petru Maior University of Târgu Mureș, and Associate Professor of the University of Paris
- Marin Sorescu (1936–1996), literary historian and poet
- Radu Voinea (1923–2010), professor of theoretical mechanics and engineering, former President of the Romanian Academy
