= Preotești =

Preoteşti or Preoţeşti may refer to several places in Romania:

- Preoteşti, a village in Iancu Jianu Commune, Olt County
- Preoţeşti, a village in Bălceşti town, Vâlcea County
