= Dobriceni =

Dobriceni may refer to several villages in Romania:

- Dobriceni, a village in Iancu Jianu Commune, Olt County
- Dobriceni, a village in Stoeneşti Commune, Vâlcea County
