= Cioroianu =

Cioroianu is a Romanian surname. Notable people with the surname include:

- Adrian Cioroianu (born 1967), Romanian historian and politician
- Ilariu Dobridor (born Constantin Iliescu Cioroianu; 1908–1968), Romanian poet, journalist and politician
