= George Emil Palade University of Medicine, Pharmacy, Science and Technology of Târgu Mureș =

Public university in Târgu Mureș, Romania

George Emil Palade University of Medicine, Pharmacy, Science, and Technology of Târgu Mureș
- Universitatea de Medicină, Farmacie, Știință și Tehnologie (in Romanian); Orvosi, Gyógyszerészeti, Tudomány és Technológiai Egyetem (in Hungarian); Universität für Medizin, Pharmazie, Naturwissenschaften und Technik Neumarkt am Mieresch (in German)
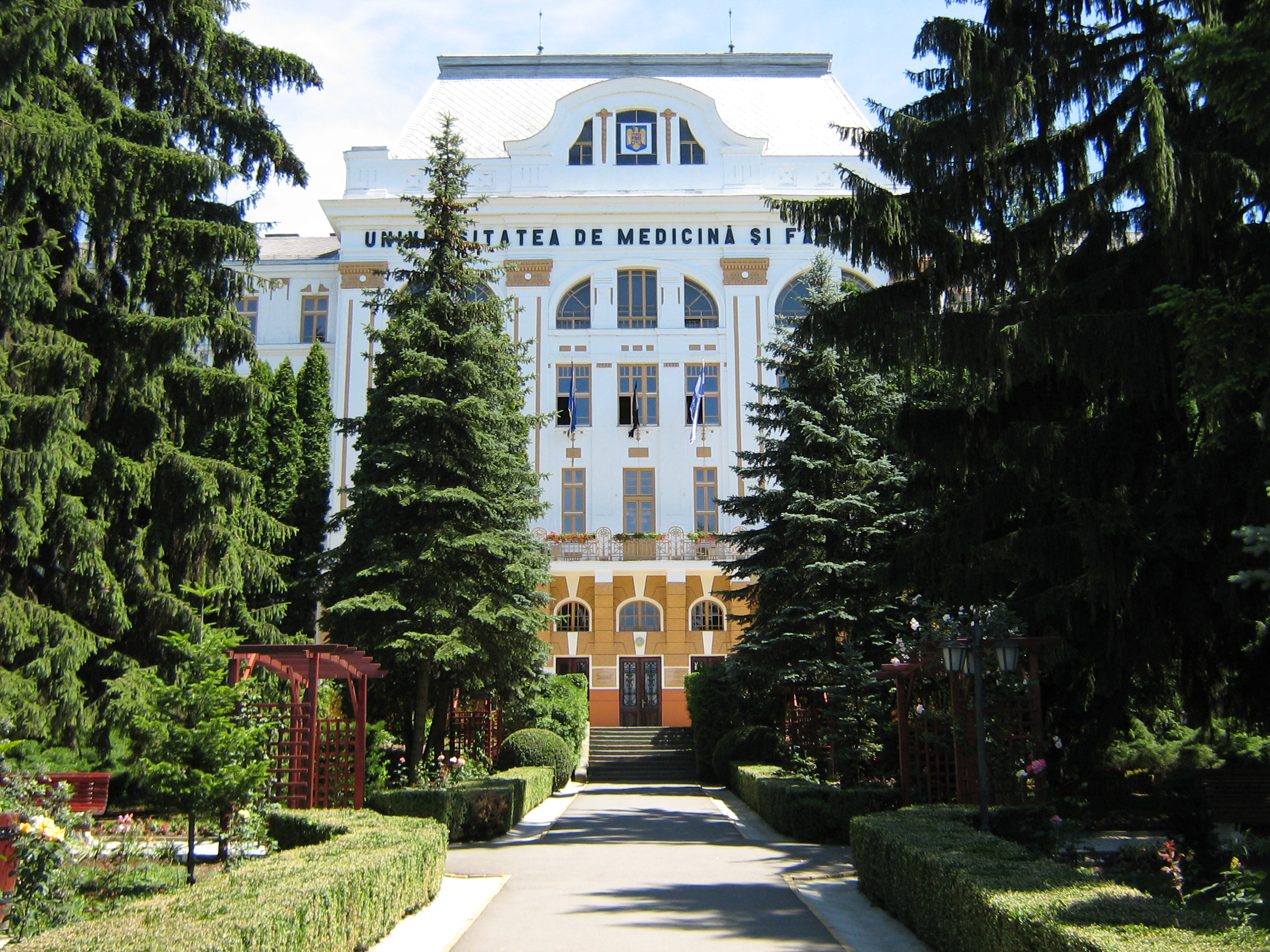
- Main building of the University of Medicine and Pharmacy Târgu Mureş
- Former names: Institute of Medicine and Pharmacy of Tîrgu Mureș (1948–1991); University of Medicine and Pharmacy of Târgu Mureș (1991–2018)
- Established: 1948; 78 years ago
- Rector: Leonard Azamfirei
- Administrative staff: over 400
- Students: over 10,000
- Location: Târgu Mureș, Romania; 46°33′18″N 24°34′52″E
- Campus: Urban
- Nicknames: UMFST; MOGyTTE; UMFST Neumarkt
- Website: www.umfst.ro

The George Emil Palade University of Medicine, Pharmacy, Science, and Technology of Târgu Mureș (Note: Romanian: Universitatea de Medicină, Farmacie, Știință și Tehnologie din Târgu Mureș, or UMFST; Hungarian: Marosvásárhelyi Orvosi, Gyógyszerészeti, Tudomány és Technológiai Egyetem, or MOGyTTE; German: Universität für Medizin, Pharmazie, Naturwissenschaften und Technik Neumarkt am Mieresch or UMFST Neumarkt a. M.) is a public university in Târgu Mureș, Romania that was founded in 1948. Classified as a research and education university by the Ministry of Education, it is one of the 6 traditional medical schools in Romania beside Bucharest, Cluj-Napoca, Craiova, Iași and Timișoara, all being founded before the 1989 Romanian revolution. The university is named after the prominent scientist George Emil Palade.

== History ==
Medical education in Târgu Mureș (also spelled as Tîrgu Mureș) began in 1945 as a branch of the Faculty of Medicine of the Babeș-Bolyai University. After the foundation of Babeș-Bolyai University, its Faculties of Philology, Philosophy, Law, Economics and Natural Sciences started their activity in Cluj while the Faculty of Medicine was moved to Târgu Mureș, where it operated between 1945 and 1948.

After the 1948 Education Reform, the Medical and Pharmaceutical Institute of Târgu Mureș was founded as an independent higher education institution with the following faculties: Medicine, Paediatrics, Hygiene, Dentistry and Pharmacy. Between 1951 and 1958 it comprised three faculties: General Medicine, Paediatrics and Pharmacy. In 1958-1959 the Faculty of Paediatrics was transformed into a department; and from 1960-1961 the department of Dentistry started operating again, becoming a faculty in the academic year 1965-1966.

By Decree 800/ 1965 and by the Order of the Minister of Education, the Institute of Medicine and Pharmacy of Târgu Mureș gained the right to award doctoral degrees in medicine (7 professors were appointed as doctoral supervisors). The Faculty of Pharmacy ceased its activity between 1986 and 1990. In 1991, the Institute was given the name of University of Medicine and Pharmacy of Târgu Mureș (UMF Târgu Mureș/MOGyE).

In September 2018, the University of Medicine and Pharmacy absorbed the Petru Maior University, and became the University of Medicine, Pharmacy, Science, and Technology of Târgu Mureș.

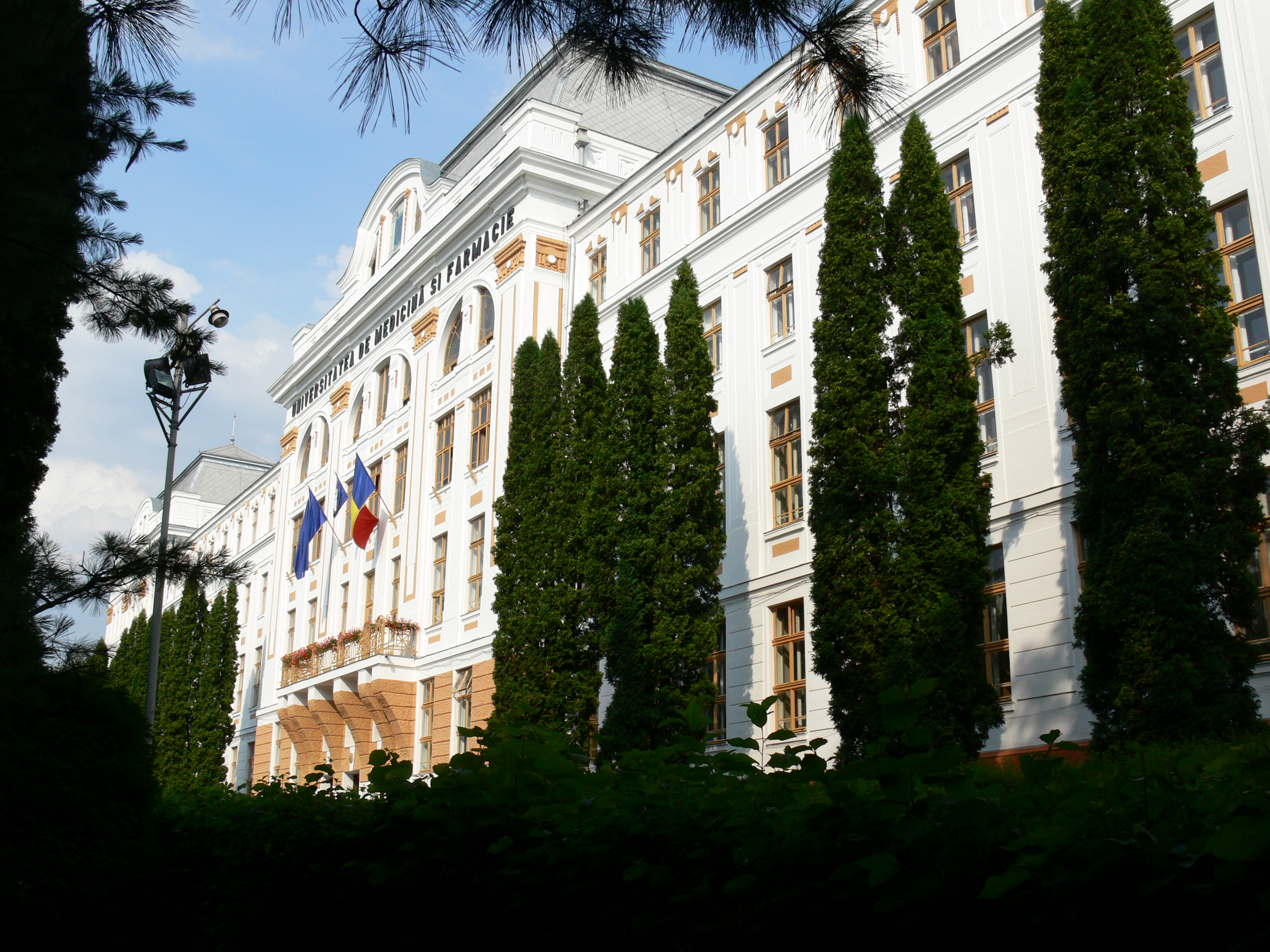
University of Medicine and Pharmacy of Târgu Mureş

== Faculties ==
The University carries on its activity as a university with a structure and specialities that are accredited by the law. The University of Medicine and Pharmacy of Târgu Mureș functions as a public institution with legal status, being the only university in the field of healthcare where teaching is in Romanian, Hungarian, and recently, in English. Graduates of study programmes can benefit from different levels of academic degrees: bachelor, master’s, doctoral. Their area of specialisation according to the division of academic knowledge and professional division of labour is also different. Following the absorption of Petru Maior University, three more faculties were integrated into the university.

- Faculty of Medicine (six-year curriculum. Languages of instruction: Romanian, Hungarian)
- Faculty of Medicine in English (six-year curriculum. Language of instruction: English)
- Faculty of Pharmacy (five-year curriculum. Languages of instruction: Romanian and Hungarian)
- Faculty of Dentistry (six-year curriculum. Languages of instruction: Romanian, Hungarian and English)
- Faculty of Engineering (Romanian)
- Faculty of Sciences and Letters (Romanian, English and French)
- Faculty of Economics and Law (Romanian and English)

== Alumni ==
- András Grépály, doctor, professor of the university and tubercologist
- Ferenc Pál Gyergyay, doctor, professor of the university and oncologist
- Adrian Lobontiu, medical doctor, surgeon of the university
- Ernő András Lőrincz, professor of the university
- Dezső Miskolczy, neurologist, constitutor of the university, professor in Târgu Mureş between 1945-1960
- László Nemes, chemist and professor

== International Locations ==
In September 2019, UMFST opened its first medical faculty in Hamburg-Bahrenfeld, Germany the form of University Targu Mures Medical Campus Hamburg (UMCH). Since 2019 a 6-year study program of human medicine has been offered on the campus in Hamburg, leading to an EU-wide regognized degree. Since UMCH is a branch of a state-run Romanian university, admission is independent of school grades. Theoretical lessons are held on the Hamburg campus in English. For the clinical (practical) parts of the curriculum from the 3rd academic year onwards, students attend one of UMCH’s teaching hospitals in Germany, in Spain or in the USA. Bedside-teaching is held in the respective national language. Optionally the study can also be finished in Romania, in this case the study language at the hospital bed is English. The first generation of students graduated in 2025 and obtained their licences.
