= Doina (Eminescu) =

Political poem by Mihai Eminescu

- by Mihai Eminescu
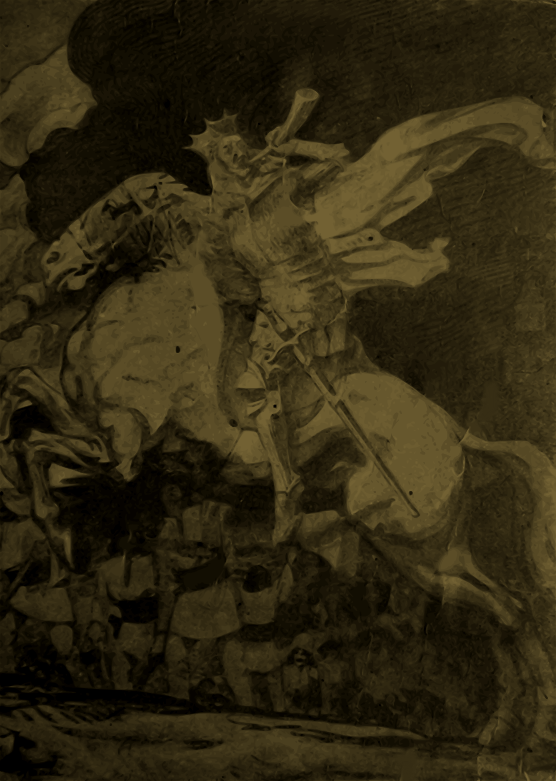
- Ipolit Strâmbu's illustration of Stephen the Great sounding his horn, for the 1914 A. C. Cuza edition
- Written: 1870?–1883
- Country: Kingdom of Romania
- Language: Romanian
- Genre(s): doina political poetry ecopoetry
- Meter: iambic tetrameter
- Rhyme scheme: aabb
- Publisher: Convorbiri Literare
- Publication date: July 1, 1883
- Lines: 61–62

Full text
- ro:Doina at Wikisource

Doina, or Doină (sometimes translated as "Lament"), is a political poem by the Romanian Mihai Eminescu. It was first published in 1883 and is therefore seen by some as Eminescu's final work in verse, although it may actually be an 1870s piece, inspired or enhanced by the perceived injustice of the Berlin Treaty. A variation of the doina (plural: doine), picked up from Romanian folklore, it is noticeably angry to the point of rhetorical violence, a radical expression of Romanian nationalism against invading "foreigners", with additional hints of ecopoetry and "anti-technicist" discourse. Doina delineates the ideal geographical space of Greater Romania, at a time when Romanian-inhabited regions were divided between an independent kingdom and multinational empires. Its final lines call on Stephen the Great, depicted as a sleeping hero, to take up the cause of Romanians and chase foreigners out with the sound of his horn. The same basic themes appear in another poem by Eminescu, the anthem-like La arme ("To Arms"), which is sometimes discussed as a variant of Doina.

Expressly anti-Russian, also read as antisemitic, anti-German, anti-Greek, anti-Hungarian, and anti-Ukrainian, Doina has been described as "chauvinistic" and "minor" by some critics, "beautiful" by others. It has been present in the Romanian curriculum since the 1890s, while also serving as subversive literature among Romanian communities in the Russian Empire. During the interwar, with Greater Romania established as a political reality, Doina became a rallying call for revolutionary nationalists and fascists. It was deemed problematic and censored during the communist period, although tacitly endorsed under the regime's latter, national-communist, phase. It was recited in more or less formal contexts by Ludovic Antal, Victor Eftimiu, and Adrian Păunescu, and subject to several admiring nods from President Nicolae Ceaușescu. The poem returned in focus during the Romanian Revolution of 1989 and after, when it also became a public symbol of Romanian identity in Moldova.

== Outline ==
Doina opens with a localization of the Romanian space, highlighting regions which were at the time in Russia and Austria-Hungary:

De la Nistru pân-la Tisa
Tot românul plânsu-mi-s-a
Că nu mai poate străbate
De-atâta străinătate.

Translation:

From the Dniester to the Tisza,
All Romanians have complained to me,
That they could not succeed
Because of all the foreigners.

—translation by Mirela Adăscăliței, in Oișteanu, p. 199

Eminescu moves focus on Bessarabia, depicted as raided by "muscali" on horseback; on Bukovina, with foreigners as "caterpillars" and stalkers of the local Romanians; then on Transylvania, crossed by the foreigners' "inroads". Overall, the projected country is aflush with intruders and the Romanian is a "foreigner in his own land"; birds are chased away, songs are extinguished, and the forest, "brother of the Romanian", is depleted. The description of this desolate landscape ends in imprecation:

Cine-au îndrăgit străinii
Mânca-i-ar inima câinii [...]

Translation:

He to whom foreigners are dear
Let the dogs eat his heart [...]

—translation by James Christian Brown, in Boia, p. 59

The ending of Doina is Eminescu's contribution to a "trans-historical" cult of Prince Stephen, who had consolidated Moldavia's statehood in the 15th century:

Ștefane, Măria Ta,
Tu la Putna nu mai sta,
[...]
Tu te-nalță din mormânt
Să te-aud din corn sunând
Și Moldova adunând!
De-i suna din corn o dată
Ai s-aduni Moldova toată,
De-i suna de două ori
Îți vin codrii-n ajutor,
De-i suna a treia oară
Toți dușmanii or să piară,
Din hotară în hotară [...]

Translation:

Stephen your Highness,
Do not stay in Putna
[...]
Rise up from your grave
That I may hear your horn sounding
And Moldavia gathering.
If the horn sounds once,
You will gather all Moldavia,
If it sounds twice,
The woods will come to your aid,
If it sounds three times,
All the enemies will perish
From border to border [...]

—translation by Brown, in Boia, pp. 194–195

== Background ==
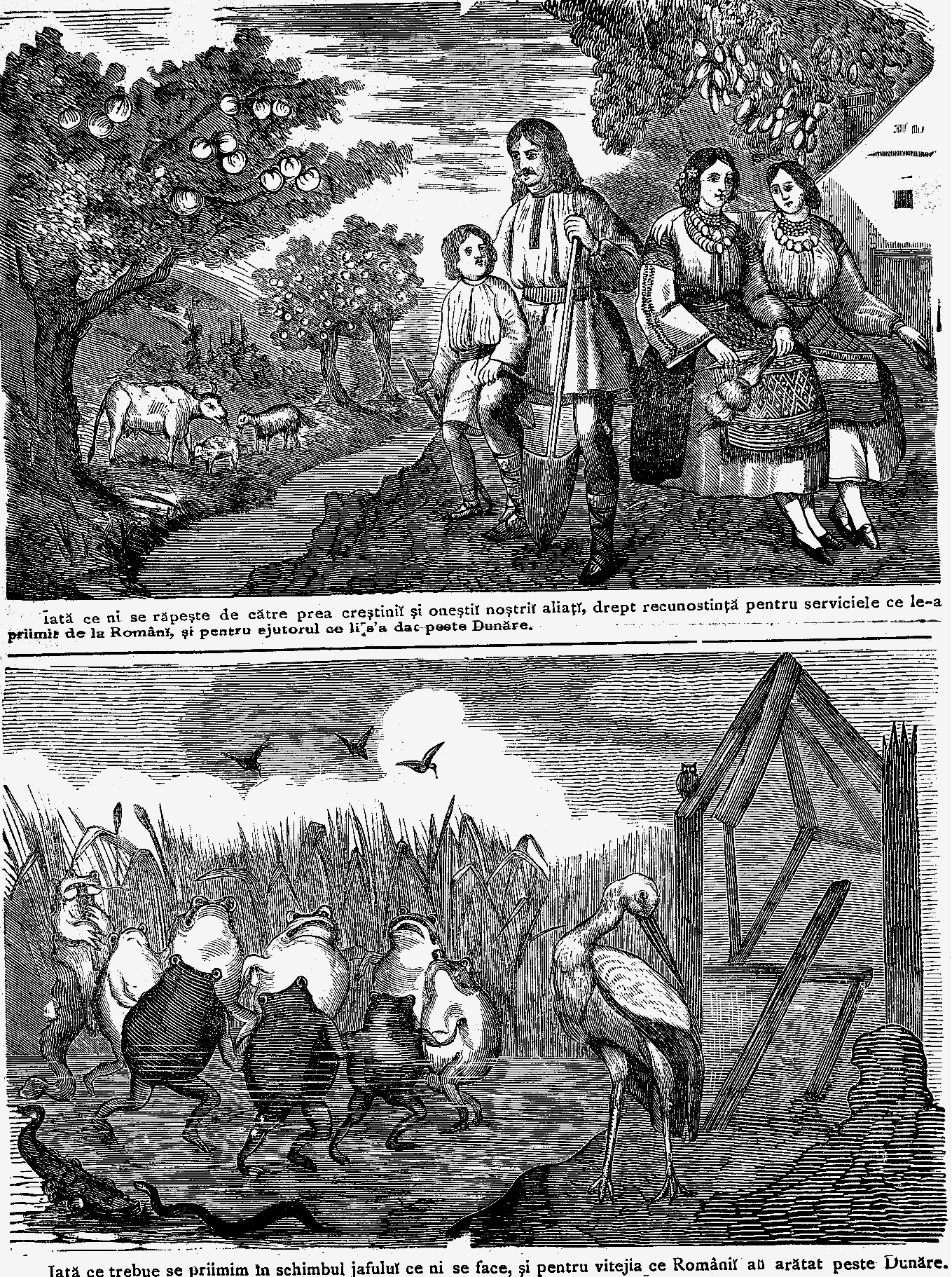
"What they take, and what they give", cartoon of July 1878 expressing a Romanian take on the Berlin Treaty. At the top, Southern Bessarabia, shown as a prosperous region with inhabitants wearing Romanian dress; Northern Dobruja, received in exchange by Romania, appears as a desolate and beastly marshland

A poet as well as a folklorist, Eminescu was well acquainted with the traditional forms of Romanian poetry, and wrote several poems in folkloric style—his Transylvanian enemy, Alexandru Grama, could therefore claim that Eminescu had simply plagiarized Transylvanian doine. As noted by Eminescu expert Perpessicius, one of his first published works, taken up by Familia in the 1860s, was a "type of doina" or a "pseudo-doina". Another variation on that pattern is addressed to "His Majesty, The Forest" (Codrule, Măria ta), with the poet asking to be turned into a tree branch, rocking into eternal slumber. Seen by scholars as an early draft of Doina, it was described as "hollow" and "rudimentary" by critic Constanța Marinescu. However, according to Călinescu, such works sound less "gauche" than actual folk poetry, as polished for print by Vasile Alecsandri. Contrarily, Perpessicius asserts that Eminescu was less talented that Alecsandri, never matching his work as a folklorist or folklore-inspired versifier. According to scholar Marin Bucur, Marinescu is essentially wrong in treating the draft as an actual poem, and also in failing to see why Doina itself is a worthy piece.

Eminescu's interest in doine only peaked after 1877, when he was living as a journalist in Bucharest, and began systematic readings from collections of folk poetry. They were integrated into a vast fund of drafts and versions for Doina, which, as noted by Perpessicius, cannot realistically be published together as a critical instrument. In its final form, Doina is popularly associated with the unveiling at Iași, in June 1883, of a monument to Prince Stephen. Eminescu was by then erratic and fatigued, displaying, already from May 1883, the early stages of a mental breakdown. Lodging with Ion Creangă in Iași, he shocked his old friend by brandishing a revolver, explained by the poet as a defense against unspecified enemies. He never actually attended the unveiling of Stephen's statue, either because he feared his apparent collapse would generate gossip and public ridicule, or because an old enemy, Bogdan Petriceicu Hasdeu, had announced his participation; he did however show up for parallel ceremonies at Junimea society. It was there that he first read his Doina, on June 4. The audience was reportedly enthusiastic, and moved in to hug Eminescu. Doina was first published by the Junimist monthly Convorbiri Literare on July 1.

An emotional Creangă later claimed that his friend had written the poem over those few days, at Creangă's own home, the peasant-style Bojdeuca. Scholar Dumitru Caracostea similarly believes that Doina is the last of Eminescu's poems, composed just before "his collapse in 1883". This is contradicted by other accounts. Researcher D. Murărașu believes that Eminescu had actually completed the poem 13 years before, while present at Putna for Prince Stephen's commemoration, and merely reused it for the 1883 feast.

Eminescu's friend Ioan Slavici describes Doina as the final work in which the poet voices his "faith in the coming national prosperity." As the illness took over, he became convinced "that he no longer had any purpose in this world". Eminescu expert Dumitru Irimia groups Doina and Luceafărul into Eminescu's "final effort". He proposes that Eminescu, sensing his "mental equilibrium" slipping away, concentrated on finishing up both works, which outline his universal and social queries. However, he dates the earliest recognizable drafts of Doina to 1878, and Eminescu's anger over the Berlin Treaty, which awarded Southern Bessarabia (the Budjak) to Russia, noting parallels with the author's political columns, taken up by Timpul in the early 1880s. According to Perpessicius, while the poem's references to rail transport may correspond to the unraveling of the Strousberg Affair, Doina is the product of 1878, written "a day after [the Budjak's] cession [...], five years before the celebrations in Iași". He believes that Doina was in any event completed in December 1882, which was the original date set for the inauguration of Stephen's statue. In 1883, Eminescu had written two hymns about Stephen in preparation for the celebrations in Iași, but never used them.

== Themes ==
=== Xenophobia debate ===
==== Overt and oblique levels ====
Himself a nationalist, Nicolae Iorga described the piece as both "beautiful" and "political", marked by Eminescu's "hatred of an unrelenting foreign invasion". Without endorsing the political message, critic Nicolae Manolescu also found Eminescu's piece aesthetically pleasing. Other commentators disagree with these verdicts. Constantin Coroiu describes Doina as "not a masterpiece, not even a small one", while Z. Ornea includes it among Eminescu's lesser poems, a "modest work in verse". Essayist Nicolae Steinhardt took an intermediary position. While he recognized Doina as inferior to Eminescu's philosophical poetry, he proposed that the verse still had "beauty bubbling like geysers", the beauty of "Thracian rocks collapsing".

Grama, who saw himself as a fellow nationalist, accused Eminescu of insincerity, noting that the message of Doina contrasted first and foremost with Eminescu's own recourse to "cosmopolitan" themes in his other work. Also according to Grama, the "idiotic" poet wrote apocalyptic verse at a time when Romanians' fates were actually improving. This verdict is not shared by other commentators. In 1934, critic Mihail Dragomirescu argued that Doina and Scrisoarea III contained Eminescu's "innermost thoughts", which led to Simion Bărnuțiu, "Romanianism", and "national mysticism". Caracostea defines the poem as an "excruciating ethnic elegy", and a sample of the "liveliest indignation"—reserved by Eminescu for politics and social commentary. According to scholar Lucian Boia, Eminescu's poetry is overall the best expression of an "anti-cosmopolitan" drive in Romanian nationalism. Boia sees Doina as sketching out Eminescu's "dream": "a pure Romanian civilization, untouched by foreign influences and still less by the effective presence of foreigners." Irimia notes the work for "absolutely confound[ing]" the poetic self with national identity, "taking on the historical being of the Romanians [and] harmonizing it with the sacred dimension of the universal being." According to musicologist Carmen Manea, both Doina and Scrisoarea III resemble in intent Frédéric Chopin's Polonaises.

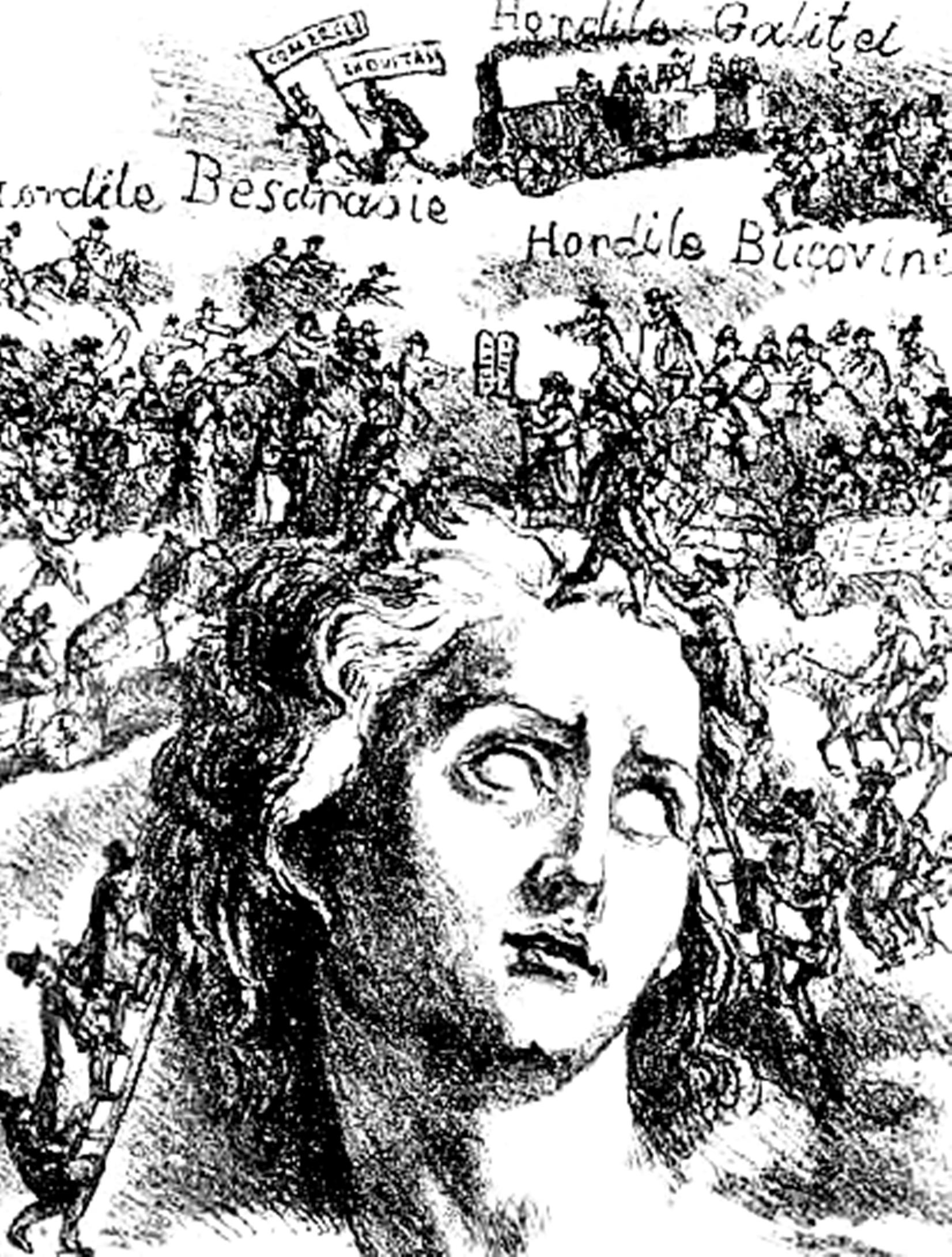
Romania overrun by the Jews and the Foreigners, in an 1875 allegory by Alexandru Asachi

As argued by comparatist Călin-Andrei Mihăilescu, the poem is one of "national revival", "explosive" in "deplor[ing] the alienation of Romanians in their own lands". Doina anticipates a Greater Romania comprising all the Romanian-inhabited regions. However, as noted by the Hungarian poet Alpár Horváth, its mention of the Tisza and the Dniester contains a "geographical inaccuracy [that] causes some complications", since the two rivers are actually located close to each other at their sources: "it is confusing for conservative European ears, unsure about whether it refers to the source or the mouth of the Tisza." Literary historian Ion Buzași proposes that Eminescu may have been referencing an earlier pseudonymous work, which he attributes to Andrei Mureșanu:

Din Tisa pân' la Nistru și-n Dunărea râpoasă
Întinde românimea pe-al patriei altar
O mână de frăție. Vai! Cât e de frumoasă
A noastră țară scumpă pe-ntinsul ei hotar.

Translation:

From the Tisza to the Dniester, and the Danube in its swell,
All Romanians are standing, to present at Mother's shrine
Arms of brotherhood extended. And our Mother looks so well,
Shining, splendid, in her borders—vast they are, and long their line!

Literary historian John Neubauer notes Doina's "chauvinistic remarks", while Bernard Camboulives refers to its "notes of xenophobia", stemming from a "growing intellectual despair". These, Camboulives notes, "might shock those readers who are unfamiliar with Romanian history". The opening lines vaguely mention "foreigners", but the portion may refer to the situation in Eminescu's own Bukovina, specifically to relatively recent presence there of Germans, Ukrainians, and especially Bukovina Jews. The significance of the "dogs-eating-hearts" line has been a traditional topic of debate within the larger community of Romanian Jews. Jewish poet-philosopher Benjamin Fondane was one of the text's noted defenders; as reported by poet and biographer Boris Marian, Fondane "loved [Eminescu] so much that he even found him an excuse for the xenophobic lyrics [in] Doina". Among the Jewish opinion-makers, Barbu Brănișteanu once argued that Doina's "foreigners", depicted as beloved by some Romanians, could not be identified as Jews: "[Eminescu] did not mean, and could not have meant, the Jews, for who was it that had been loving the Jews, in our country, back in the day?" According to Brănișteanu, a clue is offered by Scrisoarea III, which reserves its contempt for Greeks and Bulgarians, who had come to be represented in the political and commercial classes. Chief Rabbi Moses Rosen was critical of Eminescu as a political journalist, but noted that his poetic work, which he admired, was free of antisemitism: "Only in his 'From the Dniester to the Tisza' is he a xenophobe, an anti-Russian, and overall an anti-foreigner."

The half-Jewish Steinhardt theorized, in his private papers, that Doina's discourse was correct in depicting 19th-century immigrants as "troublesome and predatory". The same was proposed by scholar Petru Zugun, who believes that there is nothing specifically xenophobic or antisemitic about Doina—and that its introductory portion is simply a critique of "unproductive foreigners", some of whom happened to be Jews, immigrating to Bukovina. Zugun further argues that Eminescu was even more critical of his co-nationals, when these were unproductive. Manolescu acknowledges that background is xenophobic, targeting Russians, Jews and Hungarians. However, he argues that the poem, unlike Eminescu's articles, can be appreciated without such "sociological" hints. Critic Alex. Ștefănescu explains Doina as "sentimental, not ideological", to be understood as a declaration of love to Romania. He also notes that Eminescu was writing after "century-long dramas" provoked by "foreign occupations or by foreigners peacefully infiltrated, but never really integrated, into Romanian society, never giving up on their ethnic solidarity." As noted by culture critic Garabet Ibrăileanu, Eminescu was a xenophobe who, overall, preferred the Jews to the Romanian liberals, viewing the former as more honest and reliable. Literary historian Leon Volovici also sees Eminescu as guided by an economic theory, but notes his vision of an "objective conflict" between Romanians and foreigners, including in particular Jews (assimilated or not) and Greeks; the "apocalyptic" Doina formed part of that discourse.

==== Kinship theory and self-censoring ====
Implicitly, Doina refers to Eminescu's ranking of ethnic communities, which he differentiated by levels of kinship or intermixing with Romanians. With his articles of the mid-1870s, Eminescu showed himself persuaded that cranioscopy had demonstrated genetic links between Romanians and Bukovina's Slavic minorities, whether "Ruthenians" or Hutsuls. His conclusion was that the latter groups were in fact Slavicized Dacians. Scholar Kopi Kyçyku points out that Doina does not mention the Albanians of Romania, further noting that Eminescu was an Albanophile who especially appreciated the Ghica family. Beginning in September 1877, Eminescu as a journalist had linked his views on the Ghicas with the Bukovina issue, honoring Grigore Ghica for his attempt to oppose the region's annexation, and predicting that another Ghica would see Bukovina returned to Romania. In an unpublished article, tentatively dated to 1878–1879, he contends that Romanians, Albanians and "Dalmatians" were of the same Thraco-Illyrian race. Its commonality was an "outstanding zest for war, but always in service to the foreigner, and what is more for the benefit of wimpy neighbors [Eminescu's emphasis]".

Eminescu's private notes also detail his bitterness about a perceived racial deterioration of Moldavia's own boyar class during a century of Phanariote dominance. Using heraldic analogies, he noted that the Moldavian arms, which had once featured the "Valois lilies", could now display the "red pepper, of Phanariote-and-Bulgarian provenance". In this setting, Romania's Jews were even farther removed from the authentically Romanian peasantry, and therefore "could not merge with our people." Also from the period, La arme ("To Arms"), sometimes seen as a Doina variant, builds on this sentiment. Its third stanza includes a reference to Bukovina as falling into mâni murdare de jidan ("filthy kike hands"). Draft versions of Doina make explicit mention of "Stephen's Romanians" being "in kike hands", and record with alarm the spread of Yiddish in Bukovina. Another manuscript proclaims specific curses against the perceived enablers of Jews, Greeks, and Russians; for instance:

Cine ne-au adus Jidanii
N'ar vedea ziua cu anii
Ci să-i scoată ochii corbii
Să rămâe'n drum cu orbii

Translation:

Whoever brought us the kikes
May the crows tear out his eyes
His sight may he never find,
May he roam along the blind

The Bukovina themes had appeared in several Eminescu doine, notably including an 1877 stanza in which Eminescu, or his peasant inspiration, describes the region at "the mercy of the foreigner, which is like a thistle's shadow". The poetic image was apparently inspired to Eminescu by a Bukovina folk song, which has umbra spinului ("burr shadow") alongside references to the country being "riddled with foreigners"; this is fully quoted in his September 1877 article, Răpirea Bucovinei ("How They Abducted Bukovina"). The metaphor is also found in Doina, suggesting "the image of poverty sweeping over the country [...]. In times of drought, the thistle's shadow is more desolate than no shadow at all, a mock-offering to the heat-stricken people." A specific reference to the village of Boian, in Doina's ninth line, has contributed to that locality's notoriety in a Romanian cultural context.

Another discernible theme is Eminescu's anger over the plight of Romanians in Russia's Bessarabia Governorate, which included the Budjak. As Irimia notes, the Austrian and Russian occupations appear as a continuum in Eminescu's lyrical universe. Bessarabia in its entirety is introduced as a Romanian grievance in the opening line—according to scholar Aurel Vasiliu, the Dniester–Tisza metonymy was first used by the Bukovinian poet Vasile Bumbac (with whom, he notes, Eminescu had lukewarm relations), while Doina's views on the muscali more closely mirror Cezar Bolliac's satires. The Bessarabian topic is addressed in a parallel poem, referring to the Russians as "dog-headed" and "dog-hearted" Kalmyks, likely to "tear out the tongues" of Romanian-speakers. The early versions of Doina still made mentions of "Tatar and Kalmyk hordes". La arme similarly urges Romanians to answer the call of "gentle Bessarabia", "our younger sister", "awaiting to be murdered by dogs".

=== Eco-traditionalism and biblical echoes ===
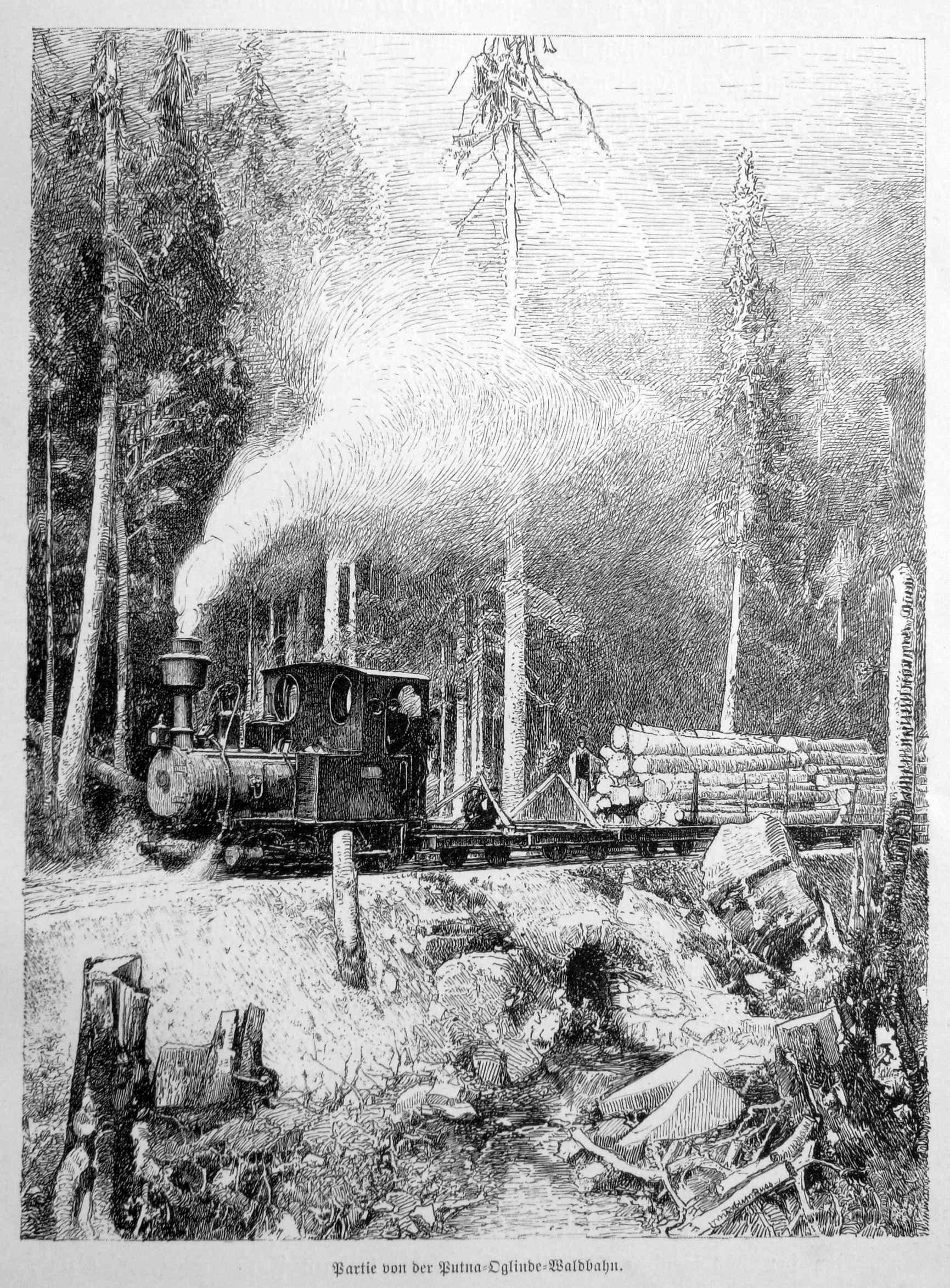
Forest railway in Putna, Bukovina. 1899 engraving by Hugo Charlemont

According to Steinhardt, the central message is not xenophobic, but "ecological", "anti-technicist", and "obviously Heideggerian", its violence being Eminescu's attempt to fend off an "ancient curse". This reading refers in particular to a line which mentions the "iron road" (the Austrian rail company) bringing in foreigners to "kill all the songs", as well as to the claim that the forest and the Romanian are like "brothers". The same lines are also highlighted by critic Barbu Cioculescu: "That Eminescu was our first environmentalist is an established fact, beyond all debate [...]. The construction of railways across the country's virgin plains, centenary forests, and murmuring waters drove him to despair". Ștefănescu rejects literal readings of the "iron road" verse, noting that Eminescu stood not for an aversion to progress, but rather against the "brutal destruction of a slowly emerging harmony", an "irreversible destruction of beautiful things." Trains have first appeared as instruments of corruption in Bogdan Petriceicu Hasdeu's "Iron Road" (1864), which exegetes such as Liviu Marian saw as "quasi-identical" with the passage in Doina, and which is primarily about the Strousberg scandal.

Folklorist Petru Gh. Savin observes that Doina's "iron road" as the killer of "all the songs" conveys Eminescu's "pain at seeing folk poetry vanish". The same reading is provided by historian Alexandru Zub, who notes Eminescu's descent into pessimism, "just a quarter of a century" after Alecu Russo had declared folklore to be an unalterable, "living book". Similarly, rural sociologist Henri H. Stahl describes the lyric as Eminescu's intuitive understanding that folklore could not be preserved into modernity. Stahl finds that Doina stood at the root of polemics about whether folklore, which is preconditioned by rural illiteracy, should be protected at all. Another scholar in the field, Traian Herseni, spoke of the lyric as evoking social distance, and more so cultural homogenization as enabled by efficient transportation. Archeologist Ioan Andrieșescu went further. He argued that Eminescu's lyrics had conveyed the irrelevancy of art in an era of mass production; he linked Doina to the philosophical essays of Henri Bergson (Creative Evolution) and Étienne Souriau.

Several commentators focus on the poem's prophetic outbursts and their literary sources. Some see Doina as primarily a curse, similar to Saint Basil's exorcism or to the Kosovo curse, in the Vuk Karadžić version. As noted by Ștefănescu, Eminescu changes the meaning of words, turning the mere fondness of strangers into a punishable crime: "[He] can make words into soft twigs, sketching on the surface of water, and also into daggers." Al. Andriescu, the Biblical scholar, argued that the central themes, of national perdition and redemption, are echoes of the Psalms, arriving at Eminescu through his readings from Dosoftei. Building on this verdict, Ukrainian researcher Volodymyr Antofiychuk proposes that Doina is a parallel to Taras Shevchenko's own psalmodic verse. Both authors, Antofiychuk notes, invoked the Bible specifically against Russian expansionism.

Although rejecting Eminescu's overall contribution, including most of Doina, Grama reserved praise for this final scene, calling it a "masterpiece", when viewed separately: "most Romanians cannot fail to be moved" by it. Comparatist Grete Tartler proposes that the "famous invocation" deepens folkloric accounts about Stephen as a sleeping hero, on par with Ogier the Dane and Frederick Barbarossa. Commenting on this portion of Doina, critic Cornelia Mănicuță notes that Eminescu was reusing a Stephen motif already found in Romantic literature. Overall, Camboulives explains Stephen's invocation as an homage to his resisting the much more powerful Ottoman Empire, and defending "the whole of Christendom." Similarly, Ștefănescu argues that Eminescu appealed primarily to the "Romanian mythology", of Stephen as an "unvanquished hero". Historian Ovidiu Pecican notes that the line about how "woods will come to your aid" could be a reference to peasant republics existing on the forested border areas of old Moldavia, providing a stable levy army. This interpretation is disputed by another scholar, Sorin Nemeti, who argues that "nobody could be convinced" of Doina's value as a historical record.

== Legacy ==
=== Becoming a symbol ===
Doina was included by Titu Maiorescu in his first-ever critical edition of Eminescu's poems, published at Editura Socec as the author had withdrawn from public life. The "classic" selection and arrangement, which place Doina right before "One Wish Alone Have I", were praised by Perpessicius as particularly tactful. Nevertheless, critics were flummoxed by Maiorescu's apparent carelessness, which, in poems such as Doina, proliferated known typos. The Socec collection is known for missing an entire line of the poem, alluding to the foreigners' reliance on the "iron road". The corrected version of Doina was published in February 1884 by Maiorescu's rivals at Contemporanul. Socec itself amended the text in its revised edition of 1895. La arme remained unpublished until 1902, but was widely known through its musical adaptation by Eduard Caudella, which is probably from 1883. Caudella himself believed that the work was a suitable anthem, "the Romanians' Marseillaise". Another version, circulated in the Banat by Liviu Tempea, was sung to the tune of Chant du départ.

The first use of Doina as an object of study in academia was I. Manliu's manual of poetics, published in 1890 and heavily indebted to Maiorescu's observations, closely followed in 1893 by Enea Hodoș's reader, aimed at Romanian schoolteachers in the Banat, and by Gheorghe Adamescu's chrestomathy. In the Kingdom of Romania, three literature textbooks for schoolchildren included Doina before 1900. The poem was also part of the theatrical repertoire, recited during intermissions by Aristizza Romanescu. In 1904, a Stephen obelisk was dedicated by the peasants of Bârsești. It included a stanza of Doina, carved into a slab of concrete.

Iorga's associate A. C. Cuza, who published in 1914 a "people's edition" of Eminescu's work, set apart a section for the doine. The cover had art by Ipolit Strâmbu, depicting the final scene of Doina, with Stephen sounding his horn. As noted at the time by Ibrăileanu, nationalism permeated the reading of Eminescu's work: while Doina and Scrisoarea III could still "serve nationalism", most of his poetry could not. Ibrăileanu argues that this realization prompted Ilarie Chendi and others to seek the publication of Eminescu's other, lesser and unfinished, prose works. The poem, and especially its reference to the "iron road", was also popular with the socialist Revista Socială, which saw the old gentry and the peasants as equally threatened by modernization.

By 1900, Eminescu's posthumous followers included Duiliu Zamfirescu, who wrote a Doina-like poem specifically about Bukovina, and the Bukovinian Radu Sbiera. According to Ibrăileanu, the latter, being an "untalented Eminescian", was inspired by Doina to the point of plagiarism. In 1902, Doina also inspired the critically acclaimed debut of Octavian Goga, a Transylvanian. The poem was already an established political symbol, circulated clandestinely in Bessarabia by Ion Pelivan. Pelivan was arrested by the Special Corps of Gendarmes in 1903. During the inquiry, Pelivan reports, the Gendarmes produced an incompetent translation of Doina into Russian, missing out on its more inflammatory rhetoric. Doina was subsequently used as a rallying call in 1912, during the centennial of Bessarabia's annexation by Russia. Its recitation headlined the "festival" organized in Bucharest by the Cultural League for the Unity of All Romanians. The respite of censorship following the Russian Revolution of 1905 ultimately produced a blossoming of the Romanian Bessarabian press, including Cuvânt Moldovenesc—which, in 1913, put out an Eminescu selection, featuring both Doina and Codrule, Măria ta. Meanwhile, Volovici notes, Eminescu's rhetoric partook in "exacerbat[ing] the negative image of the foreigner and stimulated xenophobia." As reported by writer Avram Axelard (A. A. Luca), Doina had also become an anthem for "Christian boys" in Bukovina, who used it as a justification to punch him and other Jews.

=== In Greater Romania ===
During the early stages of World War I, Romania maintained neutrality, while Transylvanian and Bukovinan Romanians were called upon to serve under arms in Austria-Hungary. At this stage, Doina could be recited in Transylvania. In June 1916, it was put to music for a theatrical performance by the Union of Romanian Women in Brașov. Two months after, the Romanian Kingdom entered World War I as an Entente country; the alliance favored the Russian Empire over Austria-Hungary, and the cause of Transylvania over that of Bessarabia. During the subsequent campaigns. La arme was a soldiers' anthem, used for instance during Nerva I. Paul's charge on German positions (October 1916), while Doina was sung by the Lăutar Cristache Ciolac as a "pitiful song of ancient woes". Driven into a war of attrition, Romania contemplated defeat in early 1918. Writing at the time in Chemarea, Benjamin Fondane reminded Iorga and other nationalists of the anti-Russian content of Doina, which, he argued, had been proven right.

The following months and years saw the creation and consolidation of Greater Romania, beginning with the union of Bessarabia with Romania. The culmination of the process was a "Great Union" (December 1, 1918), during which Romanians from Transylvania and satellite regions expressed their wish to join the country. Though invoked on the day, the slogan "From the Dniester to the Tisza" caused some controversy, as delegates from Northern Maramureș found that it excluded their homeland. The matter was addressed by a Transylvanian delegate, Ștefan Cicio Pop, who endorsed the new slogan: Trăiască România Mare de la Nistru și până dincolo de Tisa! ("Long live Greater Romania from the Dniester to the Tisza and beyond!"). The original slogan, meanwhile, was taken up by the Socialist Party of Romania, which established itself on December 11, 1918, as the "singular socialist party in all lands from the Dniester to the Tisza."

As noted in 1992 by journalist Ion D. Goia, the "natural frontiers" defined by Eminescu were not superimposed with those of the resulting Greater Romanian state, as this was no longer feasible: Regency Hungary "naturally" kept control of many territories on the left bank of the Tisza, since these were densely Hungarian; "one renounced the advantages of a natural frontier in favor of an ethnic one." Meanwhile, many Romanian-inhabited areas on the left bank of the Dniester, and immediately east of Bessarabia, were stranded in the Soviet Union. This zone later became known as "Transnistria", and is seen by Goia as "ancestral Romanian land". In interwar Bessarabia, Doina continued to have an especially strong presence as a political symbol and poetic model, while La arme was quoted as an opening text by the literary review Viața Basarabiei. Doina was also a major of influence on the anti-Russian poetry published at the time by Ion Buzdugan. In contrast, the left-wing Emilian Bucov parodied the poem, revising its central message:

De la Bugeac
până la Bărăgan
mi s-a plâns orice țăran sărman
că nu mai poate străbate
și nu de "străinătate"...
Căci chiar neaoșii stăpâni
fură-al nostru miez de pâini
și ne lasă pustiiți, nemâncați și jefuiți.

Translation:

From the Budjak
to the Bărăgan Plain
all laborers will complain
that they can never succeed,
blaming not the "foreign breed"...
It's our very own elite
stealing from the bread we eat,
leaving us with empty hand, famished, pillaged where we stand.

Social parodies of the poem also include one performed by Constantin Tănase in his 1929 vaudeville acts, and referencing the Great Depression:

De la Nistru pân'la Tisa
Tot românul plânsu-mi-s'a
Că sunt vremuri anormale
Nu's parale!
Dacă ai ajuns ministru
Ai scăpat de angarale
Sunt parale!

Translation:

From the Dniester to the Tisza,
All Romanians have complained to me,
Of this quite abnormal time:
Not a dime!
Yet if you're a minister
Life is off to better climes
With many dimes!

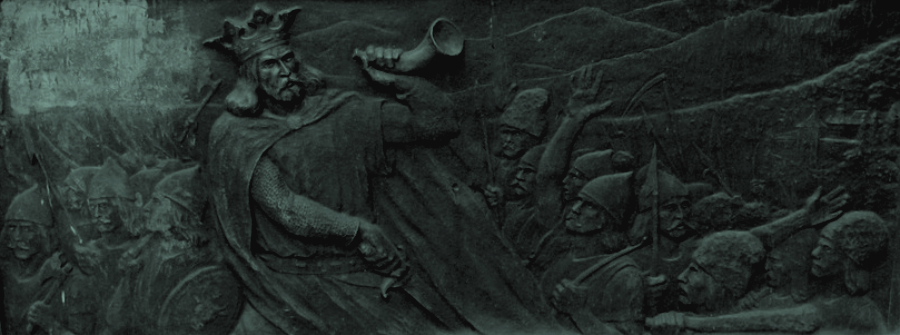
Stephen with his horn and the Moldavian military forces, Ion Schmidt-Faur's relief at the base of Eminescu's statue (1929). With empty discolored slot left by the removal of Doina quotation

Eminescu's poem had become universally present in literature textbooks, and was for the first time made accessible to the youngest cohorts by the reading aids of Gheorghe Bogdan-Duică. It also influenced sculptor Ion Schmidt-Faur, who in 1929 added a Doina-inspired relief, of Stephen and his horn, at the base of his Eminescu statue in Iași. Before and during and World War II, the work was several times transposed into foreign languages. In 1927, Ramiro Ortiz put out an Eminescu reader in Italian, which included Doina. A Hungarian-language Doina was completed by Sándor Kibédi in 1934. The Bukovinian Czech Božena Șesan published a translation into her native language in 1944.

The poem continued to be used as a political symbol, and its "dogs-eating-hearts" lines reportedly appeared in 1930 on a flag carried by the National Liberal Party's Olt section. From ca. 1927, Doina was especially popular with the Iron Guard, a fascist movement which similarly "express[ed] the ancestral, somehow atemporal, sense of Romanian purity and solidarity among Romanians" and gave Stephen an "exceptional position" in its propaganda works. The poem was also invoked by the National Christian Party, which shared the Guard's antisemitism and was sometimes allied with it. Its leader was the poet Goga, who used the lyrics to justify crimes committed by the Guard's Captain, Corneliu Zelea Codreanu, calling Doina a "gospel of Romanianism." The same appropriation happened with La arme. "Almost confiscated [...] by far-right groups", it reportedly inspired Codreanu to designate the basic Iron Guard cells as cuiburi ("nests"). By 1936, Stelian Popescu of the nationalist paper Universul was reusing the "dogs-eating-hearts" metaphor, printed in red, against his Jewish and left-wing rivals at Adevărul, accusing them of being a front for the Romanian Communist Party. As recalled by Cioculescu, during the National Legionary State the same slogan was "plastered all over the walls" of Romanian cities, "as if the Guard didn't have its own foreigners!"

=== Communist censorship ===
In late 1944, shortly after King Michael's Coup and the onset of Soviet occupation in Romania, La arme was banned. At the time, Iron Guard commandos, supported by Nazi Germany, used Doina as a password. Under the subsequent Romanian communist regime, Doina was also targeted by political censorship: already in 1946, the quotation from Doina was removed from Schmidt-Faur's relief. The poem could not be published in Bessarabia, which was included in the Soviet Union as the Moldavian SSR. The paradox was noted by Colonel Gheorghe Eminescu, who complained that Soviet authorities had reinvented his uncle into a "Moldovan" poet while making sure that no one could access either Doina or La arme. In both countries, Doina was "banned and recited only in private readings because it named Russia as one of the imperial powers that had oppressed the Romanian nation." Also uncomfortable were its "strident nationalism" and its mention of the Dniester, "at the time in the territory of the Soviet Union." Philologist Petru Creția also argued that Doina upset the communist rulers because they themselves were mostly "foreigners [...], extremely offended by the things one read in there".

In Western countries, the anti-communist Romanian diaspora still published and discussed the poem. Diaspora journalist Virgil Ierunca noted at the time that Eminescu was both praised and censored with the acquiescence of a compliant intelligentsia. He highlighted this against the oppression experienced by the other social groups, quoting Doina's "all Romanians have complained to me". The poem's nationalist prestige was preserved by the self-exiled Iron Guard poet, Aron Cotruș, who wrote many pieces which allude to Eminescu's, in both style and intertexual references, updated to refer to communism and the Soviets.

Dissidents and national-communists at home also maintained a private cult of the poem. As noted by Creția, Doina had a psychological appeal: "those who hid it under a bushel were mistaken, with this poem preserving a latent life in the national psyche; thus, the censors, instead of attenuating an obsession, have maintained it." Historian Zoe Petre recalls having been taught Doina as a youth, "in the summer of '44", which was already a gesture of defiance from her family. According to literary scholar Niculae Stoian, an "extremely courageous" study of Doina, authored by poet Mihu Dragomir, could still appear in print in 1949. Around the same time, however, actors Titus Lapteș and Ion Ulmeni were arrested by the Securitate for having kept private copies of the poem. One theory claims that a disillusioned communist poet, Nicolae Labiș, openly recited Doina at a Bucharest locale in autumn 1956, the sign of his conversion to nationalism—a departure for which he was allegedly assassinated. Reportedly, at around the same time the left-wing Victor Eftimiu expressed a wish to expunge Doina from collective memory, "for its xenophobia".

In July 1959, Romanian communist ideologue Leonte Răutu discussed the ban on literary manifestations of Hungarian nationalism with Gyula Kállai and other leaders of the Hungarian People's Republic. Răutu argued that Sándor Petőfi's "bourgeois" works, such as A székelyekhez, were selectively banned only because Eminescu's Doina was: "The Romanian population would feel [that publishing A székelyekhez] is an insult to their national dignity. The Romanian nationalist elements would immediately declare: then give us the same, because we too have such poems—De la Nistru pân' la Tisa, and even more relevant ones. [...] We believe that it is a good thing to mutilate the works of the classics". Writer Dumitru Irimia recalls that, in the early 1960s, Eminescu was la secret ("under lock and key"), primarily quoted with his "Emperor and Proletarian", but also that his high school teacher privately advised him to read Doina. Linguist Tatiana Slama-Cazacu also remembers that volumes containing Doina could not be checked out of public libraries. Pimen Zainea, at the time a monk and tour guide at Putna, recalls that he was never prevented from reciting the poem to local visitors; and that Virgil Radulian, the Minister of Education, specifically asked him to quote Doina for Hungarians and Russians attending the 4th World Festival of Youth and Students. He further reports that Miu Dobrescu, a communist potentate in Suceava County, would not commit to having Doina republished in textbooks, "as you know how things are between us and our great neighbor in the East", but that he openly encouraged recitations to continue.

=== Late-communist recovery ===
Actor Ludovic Antal was reportedly the first in his profession to test censorship by publicly reciting Doina, at some point before his death in 1970. According to his brother Iosif, this event took place at Putna in 1965. The Soviet invasion of Czechoslovakia in 1968 brought anti-Russian sentiment to the forefront, allowing Sabin Drăgoi to compose and circulate a third musical version of La arme. Essayist Nicolae Turtureanu recalls one such Doina performance by Antal at the October 1968 festival in Ipotești. The actor defied the Soviet regime, and frightened away tourists visiting from Soviet Bessarabia. At around the same time, Eftimiu revised his stance, reciting Doina to his fellow writers at a meeting in Bragadiru Hall, Bucharest. Censorship again intervened in 1969, when a treatise of Romanian history by Polish author Juliusz Demel had to be withdrawn from Romanian bookshops for featuring the first two lines of Doina as a motto. In the 1970s, following the deterioration of contacts between Romania and the Soviet Union, communist leader Nicolae Ceaușescu became more lenient toward Doina. At a Communist-Party plenary meeting early that decade, he reportedly cited the imprecation about dogs "eating the hearts" of xenophiles.

In January 1976, critic D. Micu noted in passing that Doina was one of the "patriotic and civic" works whereby Eminescu had established an entire line of succession in Romanian culture—leading down to Goga, Cotruș, and "all things viable in our current militant poetry." Also that year, Ceaușescu proposed to publish a collection of Eminescu's "national" poetry, headlined by Doina's apparent claim to Bessarabia. Discussing classical Romanian literature in April 1982, Mihai Ungheanu and Pompiliu Marcea noted as an "oddity" and "inequity" that Doina could not be fully republished, whereas Constantin Dobrogeanu Gherea's detailed critique of it had seen print in 1956. That same month, in an interview with Flacăra, historian Vasile Netea argued that Eminescu's Doina, alongside a similarly titled piece by Vasile Lucaciu, "should be learned by every Romanian, generation upon generation." On June 3, 1983, the literary gathering Numele Poetului celebrated the Doina centennial with another public reading, performed by poet Cezar Ivănescu. Also that month, writing for România Pitorească magazine, Mihai Ogrinji quoted the Stephen stanza in full, discussing the poem itself as having a "huge and all-encompassing popularity". References to Doina were still stripped from the 1977 Romanian edition of an Eminescu study, by the Frenchman Alain Guillermou. A French translation was done by Jean-Louis Courriol, but, as Courriol himself recalled, could still not be published in Romania in 1984. At around that time, Ivănescu wrote a pastiche of Doina with a covert critique of communism; this was detected, then eliminated, by the censors.

Also in the 1980s, Adrian Păunescu of Cenaclul Flacăra was staging public readings of Doina in Romania. Sometimes broadcast by radio, these were also followed by Romanian activists in the Moldavian SSR. There, the poem had remained banned in the Brezhnev Era, with Nicolae Lupan threatened and ultimately expelled from the country for having circulated it. Soviet censorship was challenged by Grigore Vieru, who alluded to Doina in subversive poems such as Ridică-te ("Arise") and Eminescu—the latter includes and explicit mention: Doina mi-o furară ("They stole my Doina"). With the onset of Perestroika reforms in the Soviet republic, the magazine Nistru published all versions of Doina in its first issue of 1988, an initiative credited to poet Dumitru Matcovschi. From her home in the Latvian SSR, Maria Macovei-Briedis published the Romanian magazine Glasul, which also took up Doina in 1988.

At the Eminescu centennial, some eleven months before the Romanian Revolution of 1989, Doina was publicly quoted in Ceaușescu's own address. As noted by Slama-Cazacu, this message was read out at the Romanian Athenaeum by Emil Bobu, who happened to be "one of [Ceaușescu's] least cultured ministers." At another such event in June 1989, Ceaușescu referred again to the "dogs-eating-hearts" portion, introduced by his take on its significance: "While treasuring all peoples and the values created by these, Eminescu hated those who broke away from the people and came to serve the foreigners." The issue of Doina came up during long debates over the publication of Eminescu's complete works. The project was endorsed by philosopher Constantin Noica, who proposed putting out facsimiles from Eminescu's manuscripts. He acknowledged in 1977 that some were problematic for the regime, "xenophobic, anti-Russian", and suggested to "leave Doina out of it [...], we'll do it like type-writer girls—this we erase, the rest can appear." In 1989, Ceaușescu ultimately allowed Creția to republish Doina in a lithographic edition which reproduced the Maiorescu original. According to Petre, this was originally planned as a regular-type edition, but Creția, who defended the inclusion of Doina, struggled with censorship for several years. During one episode of this exchange, he proposed changing "from the Dniester to the Tisza" to "from the Istros to the Tisza", which excluded reference to Bessarabia; "Dniester" would only be clarified in the erratum.

=== Post-1989 ===
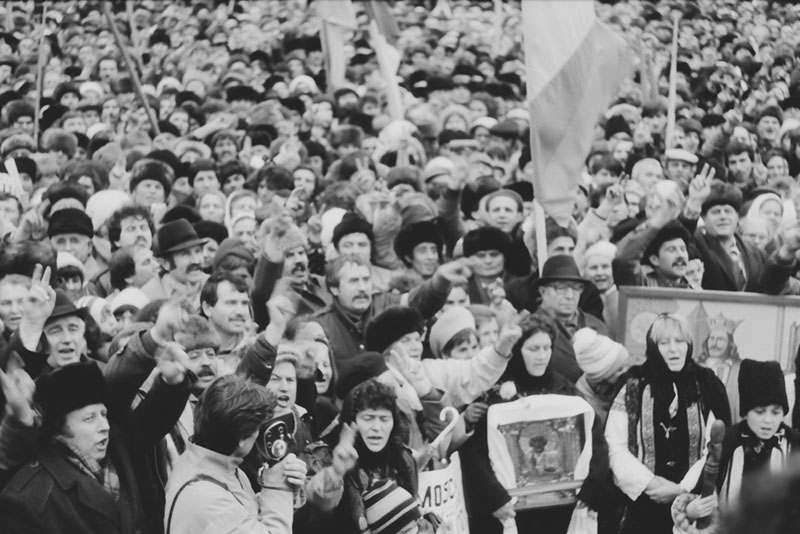
Anti-Soviet protest in Chișinău, Moldova, during 1991, with various icons and portrait of Stephen the Great

The poem was again fully accessible during the revolutionary events, its opening lines used by the National Salvation Front in its first appeals to the Iași populace. Also then, actor Victor Rebengiuc walked into the Romanian Television building and recited the poem in a live broadcast, changing stress from its condemnation of foreigners to read like an attack on people associated with the old regime. Writing on Eminescu's birthday in January 1991, critic Serafim Duicu introduced a print of Doina with the observation that: "from this day forth, Eminescu shall no longer be censored. Perhaps to the end of time." This comment referred not just to Doina being recovered, but also to other revived poems—including those which referred to Christian prayers or to the singing of colinde at Christmas.

According to Eminescu expert Cornelia Viziteu, there followed a period of "overtly nationalist" readings with "evidently superficial commentary", including popularization of Doina through other television broadcasts. Doina was again standard reading for seventh-grade students in 2011, a matter which, according to journalist Sorin Șerb, contributed to their cultural isolation: "The Romanian schoolchild doesn't live on Earth, in a universe filled with wonder, but within the borders of a 'national, sovereign, independent, unitary and indivisible state'". In the 1990s, Doina was featured on Romanian Orthodox icons, by a Comănești priest calling for Eminescu's canonization, and also reclaimed by Iron Guard revivalists; a magazine called De la Nistru pîn' la Tisa appeared in 1991. Doina was then controversially sourced by the Social Democratic politician, Nicolae Bacalbașa, during the presidential race of 2014, read as an attack on Klaus Iohannis (who is a Transylvanian Saxon).

Eminescu is also revered in the post-Soviet Republic of Moldova (former Moldavian SSR), where he has a status equivalent to that of "national poet", within the larger debate about Moldovan identity. This status is seen by scholar Wim van Meurs as "artificial" and "completely false", in particular because it has to override his Greater Romanian nationalism, "expressed in the first lines of his poem Doina". In early 1994, a group of pro-Romanian scholars, including Ion Negrei, Pavel Parasca, Ion Țurcanu, and Ion Varta, issued an open letter addressed to President Mircea Snegur, questioning Snegur's apparent embrace of "Moldovenism". In that context, they cited Doina and other works by Eminescu to highlight that the poet had explicitly endorsed the notion that Bessarabians were Romanians. On the "Moldovenist" side of the debate, the issue was brought up in the 1990s by author Ion Druță. Druță suggested that both Eminescu and Doina are not representative for the Moldovan ethos, which, he argues, relies on other elements.

In 1998, Ioana Both noted that Doina was instrumented as a slogan by the Moldova–Romania unionist movement. Writing in 2016, historian Robert D. Kaplan suggested that its first line continues to be quoted, "with its misty inoperable longing for a Greater Romania." La arme, in the Caudella version, was also recovered as an anthem by Moldovan unionists in the early 1990s. This issue was highlighted in November 1993, just before Romania's national holiday, when a Moldovan Supreme Soviet delegate recited Doina in Parliament. The ambassadors of Hungary and Ukraine left the hall in protest, sparking a debate that also involved intellectuals on either side. At the time, the Hungarian teacher Lajos Ötvös wrote a piece giving contextual justification for Doina's rhetoric. In parallel, Doina continues to be of interest to Eminescu translators in other neighboring countries, with a Ukrainian version completed by Ivan Kideshuk.
