= Sabin Bălașa =

Romanian painter (1932–2008)

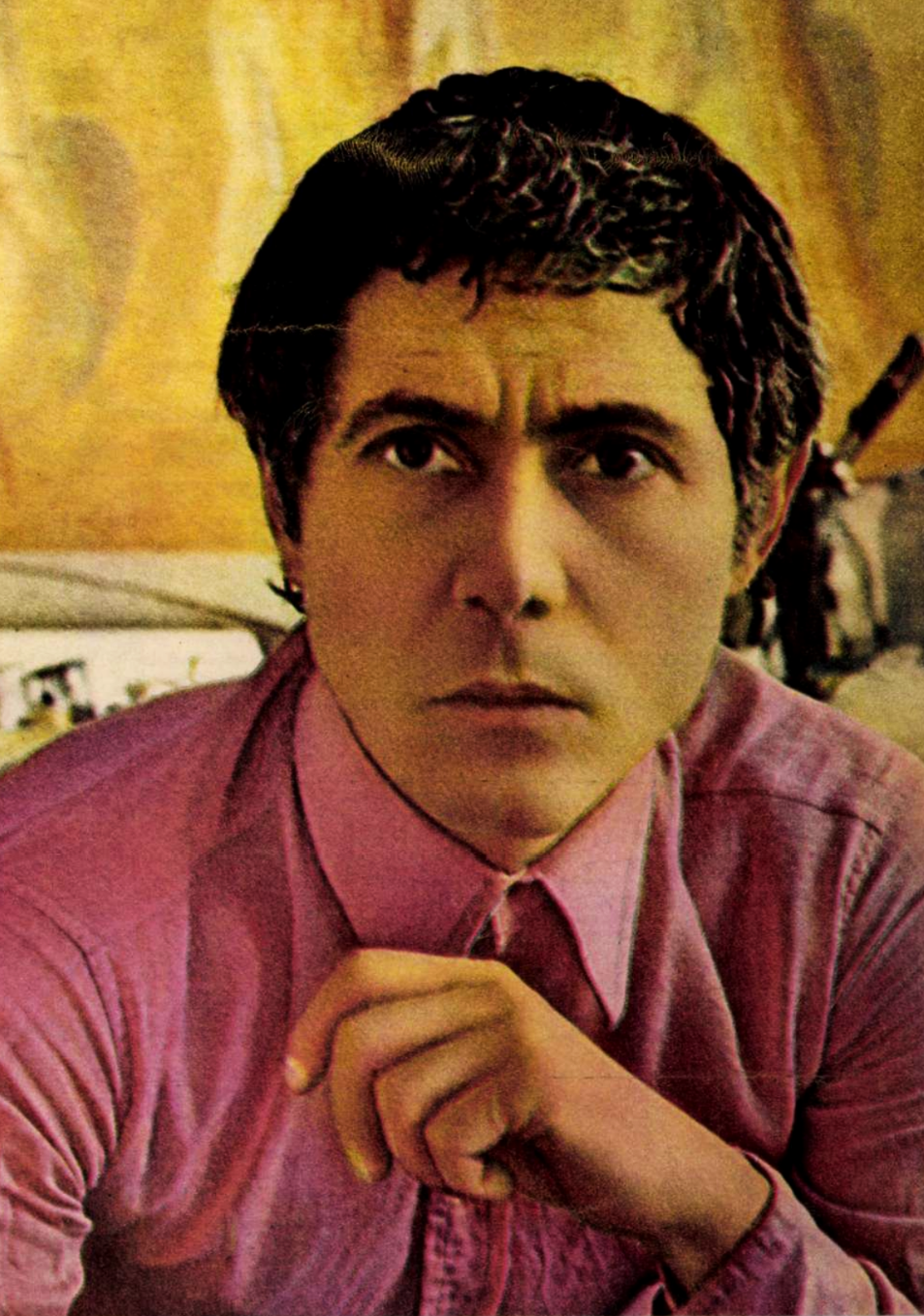
- Born: 17 June 1932; Dobriceni, Olt County, Kingdom of Romania
- Died: 1 April 2008 (aged 75); Bucharest, Romania
- Resting place: Eternitatea Cemetery, Iași
- Education: Frații Buzești High School
- Alma mater: Nicolae Grigorescu Fine Arts Institute
- Occupation: Painter
- Awards: National Order of Merit (Romania)
- Website: www.sabinbalasa.com

Sabin Bălașa (Romanian pronunciation: [saˈbin bəˈlaʃa]; 17 June 1932 – 1 April 2008) was a contemporary Romanian painter. His works were described by himself as belonging to cosmic Romanticism.

== Biography ==
Bălașa was born in Dobriceni, Olt County. After completing his secondary education at Frații Buzești High School in Craiova in 1950, he attended the Nicolae Grigorescu Fine Arts Institute in Bucharest, graduating in 1955. He continued his studies at Siena and Perugia, in Italy.

In 1973 and 1976 the Bucharest Mayor's office ordered and paid him to paint the portraits of Nicolae and Elena Ceaușescu. In the late 1980s, Bălașa was accused of promoting Ceaușescu's cult of personality.

In December 2000 he was awarded by President Emil Constantinescu the National Order of Merit, Commander rank.

In June 2005, Bălașa sued the French newspaper Le Monde for defamation after the paper reproduced a propaganda painting by another painter, claiming it was one of his. Le Monde subsequently acknowledged the error.

He died in 2008 from lung cancer at Sfânta Maria Hospital in Bucharest and was buried at Eternitatea Cemetery in Iași.

== Works ==
=== Murals ===
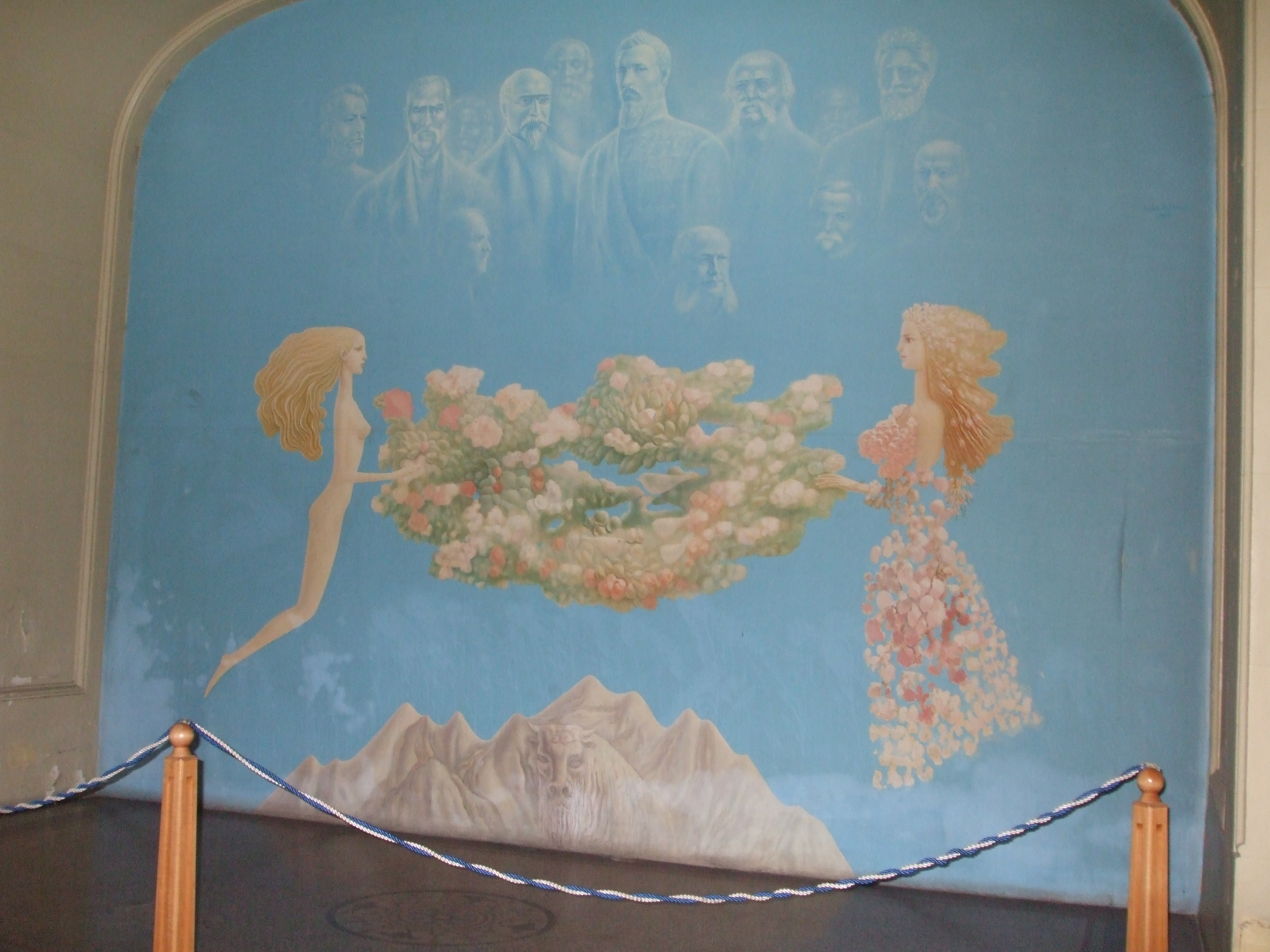
Mural by Bălașa at Alexandru Ioan Cuza University in Iași

Among Bălașa's most notable works are several large-scale fresco paintings. These include 19 murals, covering approximately 270 m^{2} (2,900 sq ft), which decorate the interior of the Alexandru Ioan Cuza University of Iași:

- Aspirație (Aspiration) – 380/546 cm
- Omagiu Întemeietorilor (Homage To The Founders) – 372/471 cm
- Amfiteatru (Amphitheatre) – 452/400 cm
- Generații (Generations) – 452/379 cm
- Triumful vieții (Triumph of Life) – 420/249 cm
- Dezastrul atomic (Atomic Disaster) – 420/249 cm
- Icar (Icarus) – 422/248 cm
- Prometeu (Prometheus) – 417/247 cm
- Exodul spre lumină (Exodus Towards the Light) – 416/247 cm
- Ștefan Cel Mare – 419/250 cm
- Moldova (Moldavia) – 430/265 cm
- Luceafărul – triptych 429/267 cm, 430/267 cm, 431/269 cm

Bălașa used the image of Mihai Eminescu depicted in the nearby statue to paint the fresco in the university lobby, identifying the poet with the hero of Luceafărul.

=== Animated painting movies ===
Bălașa was the author and director of nine animated painting movies:

- Picătura (The Drop) – 1966
- Orașul (The City) – 1967
- Valul (The Wave) – 1968
- Pasărea Phoenix (The Phoenix Bird) – 1968
- Fascinații (Fascinations) – 1969
- Întoarcere în viitor (Return to the Future) – 1971
- Galaxia (The Galaxy) – 1973
- Oda (The Ode) – 1975
- Exodul spre lumină (Exodus towards the Light) – 1979

=== Galleries in Romania and abroad ===
Rome 1978; Rome 1980; Stockholm 1982; National Museum of Art of Romania, Bucharest 1982; Kerkera Greece 1985; Moscow, Tbilisi and other capital cities of the ex-USSR 1988; Bucharest, 1992; Israel 1994; Bucharest World Trade Center 2000; Alexandru Ioan Cuza University, Iași 2002; Bucharest 2005.
