= Statue of Mihai Eminescu, Iași =

Statue of Mihai Eminescu
- Statuia lui Mihai Eminescu
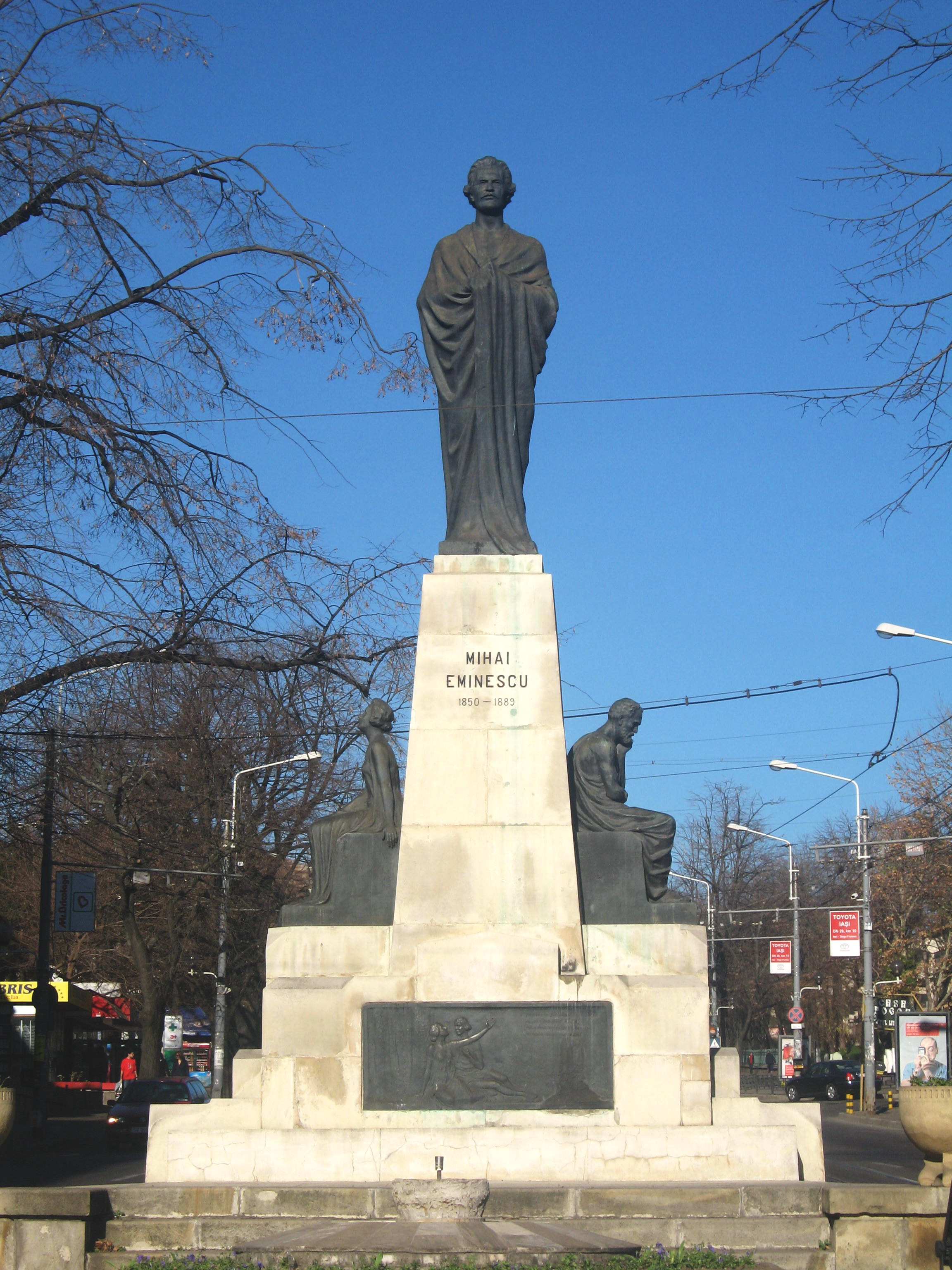
- Interactive map of Statue of Mihai Eminescu
- Location: 2 Carol I Boulevard, Iași
- Coordinates: 47°10′14″N 27°34′33″E
- Designer: Ion Schmidt Faur
- Type: Bronze sculpture
- Height: 3.35 m (11.0 ft)
- Completion date: 1928
- Opening date: 1929

A statue of Mihai Eminescu in Iași, Romania, is located at 2 Carol I Boulevard, in front of the Central University Library of Iași.

== Background ==
In 1924, the Popular Athenaeum of the Toma Cozma Church began raising funds for a statue of poet Mihai Eminescu. After collecting 1.5 million lei, a committee was formed to choose a design. Two competitions held in 1927 failed to produce a finalist, despite receiving entries from accomplished artists. A third attempt, held in 1928 under the leadership of Mihail Sadoveanu, resulted in the selection of Czech-Romanian sculptor Ion Schmidt-Faur‘s model. Completed in late 1928, the statue was unveiled in 1929, the 40th anniversary of Eminescu’s death.

The work was originally placed at the entrance to the University of Iași, where a statue of Alexandru Dimitrie Xenopol now stands. Artistically, the result is not considered out of the ordinary. It has been suggested that the poet’s overwhelming character inhibited sculptors’ inspiration, especially during that period. Other contemporary efforts faithfully reproduce his face, but are artificial and lack expression.

== Description ==
The backers stipulated that Eminescu had to be depicted at age 30. Thus, the sculptor drew from later portraits, neglecting the photograph of the youthful Eminescu that has since become classic. The poet is clad in the folds of a timeless toga. The bronze statue is 3.35 meters high. Later, Sabin Bălașa used the image on a fresco in the university lobby, identifying the poet with the hero of Luceafărul.

The pedestal measures 5.20 meters and is made from Vratsa stone. Each side features a human-sized bronze statue depicting Philosophy and Poetry in allegory. They sit on chairs, as suggested by committee member Orest Tafrali. Reportedly, the sculptor modeled the latter on his wife and not, as presumed, on Eminescu's lover Veronica Micle. The male figure has been said to depict Poor Dionis, but resembles the sculptor himself.

Two bas reliefs are set near the base of the pedestal, depicting scenes from Luceafărul and Doina. In 1946, soon after the Soviet occupation of Romania, the authorities chiseled out the nationalistic quotation from the latter poem. Two surrounding stone benches were added at the behest of Tafrali, inspired by the Paris statue of François Coppée. In 1957, the ensemble was moved to its current site at the foot of Copou Hill. Previously, the demolished Union Monument had stood there.

Since 2004, the statue has been listed as a historic monument by Romania's Ministry of Culture and Religious Affairs.
