= Petre Dumitrescu =

Romanian general (1882–1950)

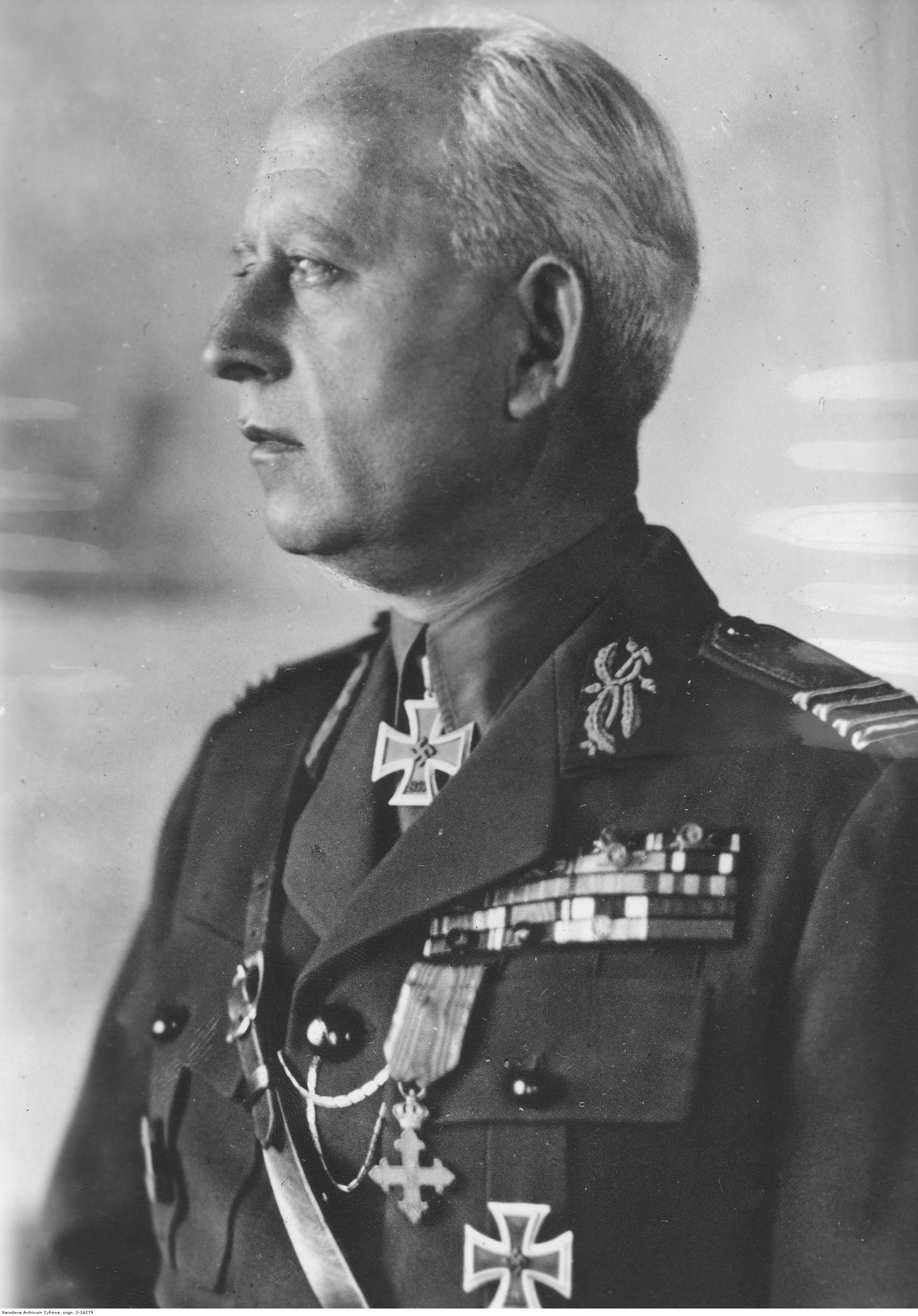
- Dumitrescu in 1944
- Born: 18 February 1882; Dobridor, Dolj County, Kingdom of Romania
- Died: 15 January 1950 (aged 67); Bucharest, Romanian People’s Republic
- Military career
- Allegiance: Kingdom of Romania
- Branch: Army
- Service years: 1903–1944
- Rank: General
- Commands: First Army; Third Army
- Conflicts: World War I; World War II; Eastern Front; Operation München; Crimean Campaign; Battle of the Kerch Peninsula; Battle of the Sea of Azov; Battle of Rostov; Battle of the Caucasus; Operation Edelweiss; Battle of Stalingrad; Operation Uranus; Dnieper–Carpathian Offensive; First Jassy–Kishinev Offensive; Second Jassy–Kishinev Offensive
- Awards: Order of Michael the Brave, 3rd Class; Order of Michael the Brave, 2nd Class; Order of the Star of Romania, 1st Class; Order of the Crown (Romania); Knight's Cross of the Iron Cross with Oak Leaves

Petre Dumitrescu (Romanian pronunciation: [ˈpetre dumiˈtresku]; 18 February 1882 – 15 January 1950) was a Romanian general during World War II who led the Romanian Third Army on its campaign against the Red Army in the Eastern Front.

== Early life and military career ==
Dumitrescu was born in Dobridor, Dolj County. He began his military training at the Artillery and Engineers Officers' School in 1901, graduating in 1903 with the rank of second lieutenant. He was promoted to lieutenant in 1906 and, five years later, to captain. That year, he was admitted into the Military Academy at Bucharest, graduating in 1913.

When World War I started, Dumitrescu was a major. Following the war, he climbed higher and higher in the military hierarchy, becoming a lieutenant colonel in 1920, a brigadier general in 1930, and a major general in 1937. Between 1937 and the beginning of World War II, Dumitrescu served as a military attaché in both Paris and Brussels. After returning to Romania from these postings, he was given command of the First Army.

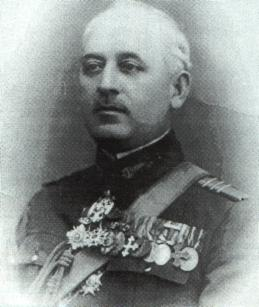
Dumitrescu in 1937

== Initial successes ==
On March 25, 1941, Dumitrescu was made commander of the Third Army, a post which he would hold for the duration of the war. On July 5, 1941, he attacked the Soviet forces in northern Bukovina and took Cernăuți (Chernivtsi), reclaiming territory occupied by Soviet troops since June 28, 1940. He then crossed the Prut to recover northern Bessarabia. The German Eleventh Army covered Dumitrescu's right flank while he advanced towards the Dniester. At that point his army and the German 11th army switched places, with Italians continuing advancement over the Dniester towards the Southern Bug river, and Dumitrescu remaining on recovered Romanian territory. In September of that year, Dumitrescu repulsed a Soviet attempt to cross the Dniester in the east, behind the Eleventh Army.

After Adolf Hitler convinced Ion Antonescu to continue the war beyond Romania's pre-1940 borders, Dumitrescu then led the Third Army to the Crimea, taking part in the Battle of the Sea of Azov. By October 10, the Third Army had marched 1,700 kilometres from Romania, fought four major battles and 42 minor engagements.

By this time, Dumitrescu's Third Army had inflicted casualties of over 20,000 killed and 40,000 wounded and also captured 15,565 prisoners of war, 149 tanks, 128 artillery pieces, and more than 700 machine guns, while suffering 10,541 casualties (2,555 dead, 6,201 wounded, and 1,785 missing in action).

For his effort in this campaign, Dumitrescu was awarded the Knight's Cross of the Iron Cross, the second Romanian to receive the award after Ion Antonescu. Later on he was even given the Oak Leaves. In October, he was awarded the Order of Michael the Brave, 3rd class.

On July 18, 1942 he was made a general, thus becoming Antonescu's second-in-command. Shortly after his promotion, Dumitrescu advanced towards the Taman Peninsula, between the Sea of Azov and the Black Sea, creating a vital bridge between Axis forces in Europe and those deeper inside the Soviet Union.

== Retreat ==
The German forces in Stalingrad were in dire need of assistance, and the German High Command transferred many of its troops to the besieged city, which meant the Third Army now had fewer troops to defend an increasingly large front. This was ameliorated, to a certain degree, by the High Command's decision to incorporate all Romanian forces in the southwest of the Soviet Union into the Third Army. The High Command, however, chose to ignore Dumitrescu's reports about a Soviet troop buildup in the southwest, as they did with his repeated suggestions to attack the Soviet bridgehead at Kletskaya.

In November 1942 the Red Army launched a devastating attack in the southwest, breaking through the Romanian line and forcing Dumitrescu into retreat. For a brief period, the Third Army dug in near the Chir River, but Soviet troops pushed them back. In December 1942, the decision was made to strategically retreat westwards.

Between 26 March and 24 August 1944, he commanded "Army Group Dumitrescu" which was composed of the German 6th Army, under command of Maximilian de Angelis and later Maximilian Fretter-Pico, and his own Romanian 3rd Army.

After the Second Jassy–Kishinev Offensive, Dumitrescu's plan was to reach Bucharest and avoid any engagements with the Red Army along the way. However, Red Army troops ambushed Dumitrescu. When what remained of the Third Army arrived in Bucharest, the Soviets had captured more than 130,000 Romanian soldiers.

By this time, however, as with the rest of Romania, Dumitrescu turned against Nazi Germany and captured more than 6,000 German prisoners of war. He retired in early September, 1944, as the Romanian Army and the Red Army retook Northern Transylvania and advanced into Hungary.

== After the war ==
In 1946, Dumitrescu was put under house arrest and put on trial for war crimes by the new communist government, but was eventually acquitted because of a lack of evidence. He died of natural causes at his Bucharest home in 1950.

== Promotions ==
- Sublocotenent (2nd Lieutenant) - 1903
- Locotenent (Lieutenant) - 1906
- Căpitan (Captain) - 1911
- Maior (Major) - 1916
- Locotenent-colonel (Lieutenant Colonel) - 1917
- Colonel (Colonel) - 1920
- General de brigadă (Brigadier General) - 1930
- General de divizie (Major General) - 1937
- General de corp de armată (Lieutenant General) - 1941
- General de armată (General) - 1942

== Awards and decorations ==
- Iron Cross 2nd Class (28 July 1941) & 1st Class (12 August 1941)
- Order of Michael the Brave 3rd Class (17 October 1941) & 2nd Class (19 February 1944)
- Knight's Cross of the Iron Cross (1 September 1942)
- Knight's Cross of the Iron Cross with Oak Leaves (4 April 1944)
