= Petru Maior University of Târgu Mureș =

University in Târgu Mureș, Romania

Coordinates: 46°32′48″N 24°34′6″E

- Type: Public
- Established: 1960
- Rector: Prof. univ. dr. Călin Enăchescu
- Students: 3,691 (2012)
- Location: Târgu Mureș, Romania
- Website: www.upm.ro

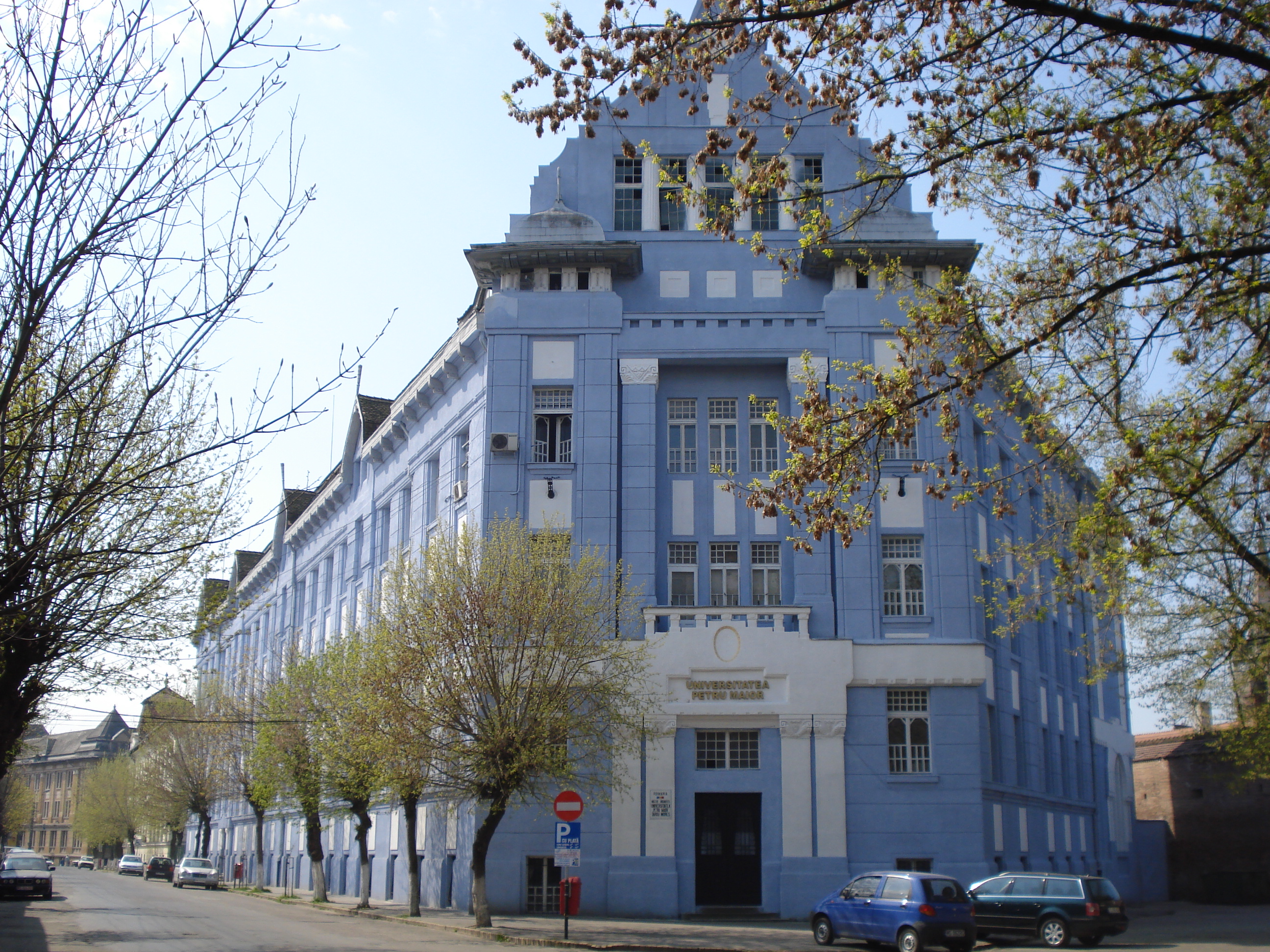

The Petru Maior University (Romanian: Universitatea Petru Maior) of Târgu Mureș, Romania, was a university founded in 1960. In September 2018, Petru Maior University was incorporated into the University of Medicine and Pharmacy of Târgu Mureș.

== History ==
Founded in 1960 as The Pedagogical Institute of Tîrgu Mureş, Petru Maior University became The Technical University of Tîrgu Mureş in 1991, The University of Tîrgu Mureş in 1995 and was renamed Petru Maior University in 1996 in the honour of the Romanian historian, philosopher, and linguist Petru Maior.

== Departments ==
The university had 3 faculties, all currently being integrated into the University of Medicine, Pharmacy, Science and Technology of Târgu Mureș:

- Faculty of Economics, Law and Administrative Studies
- Faculty of Sciences and Letters
- Faculty of Engineering
