= Moțăței =

- Commune
- Location in Romania
- Coordinates: 44°6′N 23°12′E
- Country: Romania
- County: Dolj

Government
  - Mayor (2020–2024): Florentin-Răzvan Mărgelu (PSD)
- Area: 129.09 km^{2} (49.84 sq mi)
- Elevation: 70 m (230 ft)
- Population (2021-12-01): 5,920
  - Density: 45.9/km^{2} (119/sq mi)
- Time zone: UTC+02:00 (EET)
  - Summer (DST): UTC+03:00 (EEST)
- Postal code: 207415
- Area code: +(40) 251
- Vehicle reg.: DJ
- Website: comunamotatei.ro

Moțăței is a commune in Dolj County, Oltenia, Romania, with a population of 5,920 people as of 2021. It consists of three villages: Dobridor, Moțăței, and Moțăței-Gară.

Historical population
Year	Pop.	±%
2002	8,243	—
2011	6,935	−15.9%
2021	5,920	−14.6%
Source: Census data

== Natives ==
- Ilariu Dobridor (1908–1968), writer and politician
- Petre Dumitrescu (1882–1950), army general
- Ștefan Iovan (b. 1960), football player
