= Iancu Jianu, Olt =

Iancu Jianu
- Commune
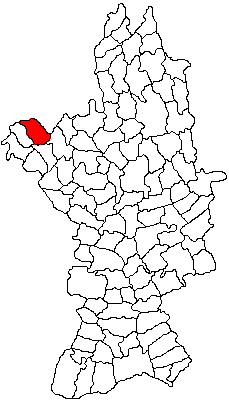
- Location in Olt County

- Location in Romania
- Coordinates: 44°30′N 24°2′E
- Country: Romania
- County: Olt

Government
  - Mayor (2020–2024): Paulică Munteanu (PNL)
- Elevation: 167 m (548 ft)
- Population (2021-12-01): 3,511
- Time zone: EET/EEST (UTC+2/+3)
- Postal code: 237220
- Area code: 0249
- Vehicle reg.: OT
- Website: www.primariaiancujianu.ro

Iancu Jianu is a commune in Olt County, Oltenia, Romania, named after the 19th century Wallachian hajduk Iancu Jianu. It is composed of three villages: Dobriceni, Iancu Jianu, and Preotești.

== Natives ==
- Sabin Bălașa (1932–2008), painter
- Florin Popescu (born 1974), sprint canoer
