= Ilariu Dobridor =

Romanian writer and politician (1908–1968)

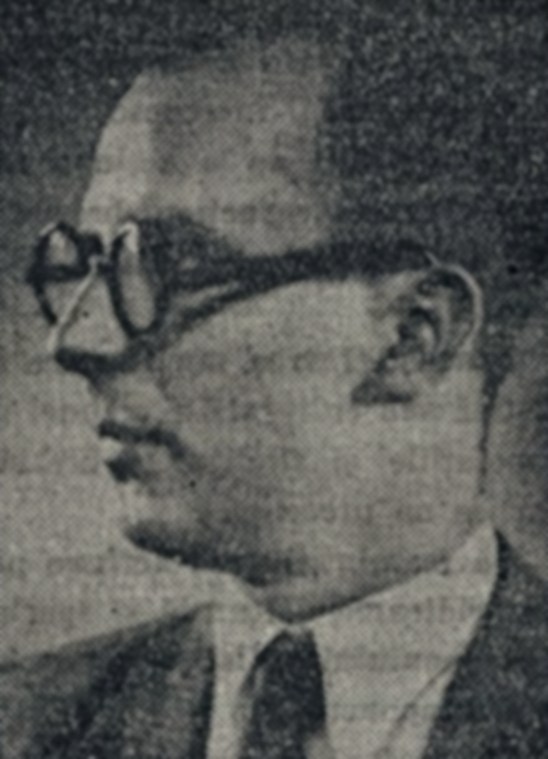
- Dobridor in 1935
- Born: Constantin Iliescu Cioroianu; 31 October 1908; Dobridor, Dolj County, Kingdom of Romania
- Died: January 1968 (aged 59); Bucharest, Socialist Republic of Romania
- Occupations: Journalist; politician; civil servant; farmer
- Writing career
- Period: c. 1928–1954
- Genres: Lyric poetry; philosophical poetry; essay; reportage; autobiography
- Literary movement: Modernism; Gândirea

Ilariu or Ilarie Dobridor, pen name of Constantin Iliescu Cioroianu; 31 October 1908 – January 1968), was a Romanian poet, essayist, and political figure. Born into the Romanian Kingdom's peasant class, he obtained academic recognition while studying philosophy at the University of Bucharest. He debuted as a poet, then turned to political journalism and literary criticism; integrated within the disputatious and economically disadvantaged intellectual youth of the 1930s, he took part in its large-scale debates. At that early stage, Dobridor was inspired stylistically and politically by Tudor Arghezi, whom his own poetry closely echoed. Committed to a passionate version of Romanian nationalism, he had clashes with the country's left-wingers, but also with those conservatives whom he viewed as impostors. By 1934, he was affiliated with the National Peasants' Party, serving briefly as editor of Dreptatea and leader of the Bucharest youth section. He became opposed to the group's leftist factions, on which subject he quarrelled with the national chairman, Ion Mihalache; expelled in April 1937, he and his disciples joined the far-right National Christian Party in February 1938. He was by then also affiliated with Nichifor Crainic's Gândirea, and contributing to newspapers put out by the Iron Guard.

All parties were suspended days after his National Christian recruitment, and King Carol II introduced his authoritarian constitution. Dobridor folded back on cultural journalism, founding the weekly Presa, but also joined Carol's sole legal party, the National Renaissance Front. As Romania entered World War II as part of the Axis powers, he became a regular soldier and press correspondent on the Eastern Front, sending back reports of atrocities committed by the Soviet Union, as well as glimpses of retaliatory murders by anti-communists. He also published a racially antisemitic tract, discussing Jewishness as a trait related to moral and cultural decadence. Returning to Bucharest in late 1941, he was employed by Ion Antonescu's dictatorial regime as a functionary of the Romanianization office, tasked with purging Romanian Jews from public life. Dobridor also began publishing his own newspaper, Poporul, as well as biographical works detailing the lives of peasant intellectuals. A successful anti-fascist coup in 1944 resulted in his banishment from the press; in 1954, the communist regime had him imprisoned, and he was only freed ten years later. He remained brazen in his anti-communism down to his mysterious and violent death in January 1968.

== Early life and PNȚ recruitment ==
Constantin Iliescu Cioroianu took his pen name from the village of Dobridor, where he was born on 31 October 1908; his parents were farmers Florea and Maria Cioroianu. The couple also had a daughter, Maria Iliescu, who died in December 1936. Granted a scholarship, Constantin graduated from the local primary school, then attended Frații Buzești High School in Craiova, before being accepted by the University of Bucharest. He completed his education at the latter's faculty of letters and philosophy, earning praise from his teacher Nicolae Cartojan; he was however primarily influenced by Nae Ionescu. Dobridor's debut was as a poet, with samples picked up in 1928 by the regional magazine, Ramuri. His "autobiography in verse" was carried in 1929 by Eugen Jebeleanu's magazine, Pe Drumuri Noi. Philologist Stănuța Crețu notes that such pieces had the ambitions of being recognized as philosophical poetry, but were rather "naive and prosaic". She sees Dobridor as always inspired by the more senior Tudor Arghezi, to the point where he reused Arghezi's "images and meanings" in his own pieces.

During the interwar, Dobridor was a prolific journalist. By autumn 1929, he was affiliated with Gh. Șt. Cazacu's review, Orizonturi Noi. Together with colleagues such as Cazacu, George Murnu, Pan M. Vizirescu, and Radu Gyr, he paid a visit to their literary idol, George Bacovia, who received them at his home in Cotroceni. In January 1931, Dobridor had agreed to join literary critic Octav Șuluțiu in publishing a magazine whose writers were only to be identified by numbers (Dobridor was "Number 5"). The project fell apart when other colleagues, primarily including Constantin Noica ("Number 4"), issued objections to the format. Under his main adoptive name, but also as "Ilie Constantin" and "N. D. Tomcea", Cioroianu-Dobridor was regularly published by magazines such as Arghezi's own Bilete de Papagal, and also by Reporter, Excelsior, Herald, and Datina. He was co-opted as one of the core writers at Sandu Tudor's Floarea de Foc magazine (1932–1933), representing the group's right-wing (somewhat opposed to leftist colleagues such as Ghiță Ionescu, Alexandru Robot, and Alexandru Sahia). Occasional works saw print in Azi, Convorbiri Literare, Facla, Familia, Revista Fundațiilor Regale, Tribuna, Viața Romînească, Universul Literar, and Secolul.

In 1934, Dobridor was affiliated with the National Peasants' Party (PNȚ), editing its national daily, Dreptatea; during his first months there, he engaged in a publicized and violent polemic with various figures of the intellectual youh, targeting in particular Petru Comarnescu and Zaharia Stancu. His first volume, Versuri ("Verse"), appeared that same year in Craiova, within the Pământ și Suflet Oltenesc series (put out by Constantin S. Nicolăescu-Plopșor). Floarea de Foc's Robot gave him encouragement, describing him as an Arghezian poet (albeit one in a "traditional line"). Robot praised Dobridor's "clear, perfect poetry" of "interplanetary and cosmic inspiration", but suggested that he still needed to find his own voice. In early 1935, Gând Românesc paper hosted Dobridor's thoughts on "treason by the intellectuals". In this text, he identified the establishment intellectuals as heirs to the predatory boyardom, and castigated elites for their traditional xenophilia, noting that the common folk had always been subverted by its supposed caretakers.

== Generational polemicist ==
Dobridor remained involved in the ideological disputations that split his generation into small factions. Mircea Vulcănescu, who rallied with traditionalist conservatism and an Orthodox-centered identity, regarded him as his adversary to the center. This centrist group, also frequented by Emil Cioran, Mircea Eliade, Eugène Ionesco and Petru Manoliu (as they were in 1934), was equally critical of conservatism and Marxism; its exponents searched for a "revolutionary spirituality" that was also not entirely adverse to literary modernism. Dobridor made himself infamous as a polemicist: in March 1935, the Ilfov County tribunal sentenced him to a one-month term in prison, as well as ordering him to pay 50,000 lei in damages, for his libel against art critic Comarnescu. Another colleague, Petre Pandrea, drew him an unflattering portrait in his scattered memoirs: "[Dobridor is] freakishly small, envious, bitter, mean, a nuisance who knows how to spit better than any cat".

Dobridor's commitment to the Peasantist doctrine was exacerbated by his group's opposition to the governing National Liberal Party. Reportedly, in August 1935 he was pounced upon and beaten up by unknown assailants, rumored to have been undercover agents of the Romanian Police, while walking about Cișmigiu Gardens. In December 1935, he was general secretary of the PNȚ youth section in Bucharest. In this capacity, he censured "right-wing agitators" such as the Iron Guard, noting that his and his party's nationalism was agrarian-focused, subsumed to the peasantry, and as such more legitimate than fascism. He repeated the message at a March 1936 rally in Râmnicu Vâlcea, where, as Dreptatea reported, he dressed down "all those who propagate anarchy and hatred." During that interval, Dem I. Dobrescu, who had stood on the PNȚ's left, quit the party, claiming that its centrist leadership had asked for his speeches to be reviewed and censored by Dobridor. The issue created a stir in political circles, since Dobrescu was a senior politician and former Mayor of Bucharest, next to whom Dobridor appeared as an opportunist. Gossip credited to another PNȚ centrist, Mihail Ghelmegeanu, had it that Dobridor had once survived on subsidized dairy, provided to him and other struggling youths as part of Dobrescu's extensive welfare program.

Dobridor's tenure at Dreptatea ended in 1936, when he switched to a similar position at Flamura Verde, where he only served for a year. In December 1936, he represented the PNȚ's youth at a party rally on Calea Moșilor. Also then, the party press issued his ideological tract, Problema tineretului ("The Problem of Youth"), in which he outlined Peasantist promises regarding the new generations. He pledged the party to a "cultural offensive" which would have enlightened the peasantry, and provided it with opportunities for social uplift, as well as offering employment to graduates; Dobridor acknowledged that the same had been tried by the dominant National Liberals, but noted that they had given in to incompetence and sheer corruption. He also militated for "sound links" between the rural and the urban, aiming to curb the social marginalization of second-generation peasants.

Arghezi and his disciple shared a localist vision, as spiritually attached to the region of Oltenia. From March 1937, they were both members of the Union of Oltenian Writers (USO). Dobridor himself turned to literary and philosophical criticism in the 1937 work Organizarea minciunii ("Organizing the Lie"), published in tandem with his poems, Vocile singurătății ("Voices of Solitude"). Crețu recognizes his "vast readings in philosophy", but notes that his jibes were made with "obvious blindness": his targets included former friends Cioran, Eliade, Ionesco and Vulcănescu, all of whom he saw as alienated from the true Romanian psyche. He sent a copy of Organizarea minciunii to Arghezi, crediting him as his mentor when it came to "untangl[ing] organized lies". According to literary columnist Vladimir Streinu, Vocile singurătății was still indebted to Arghezi, but inferior to its model and lacking any "great uplift". Critic George Călinescu was more welcoming: though he believed that "Mr Dobridor is still too verbose", he appreciated his lexical experiments and "seraphic" imagery, proposing that these made Dobridor into a follower of Stéphane Mallarmé.

== Fascist drift ==
Also in March 1937, Dobridor and his followers came to oppose PNȚ leader Ion Mihalache over Mihalache's cultivation of known leftists, especially Nicolae L. Lupu. This young right of the PNȚ was troubled by Mihalache's overtures toward forming a "popular front" against the Iron Guard, planned as a working alliance ahead of the local-council elections. During a congress of the Peasantist youth, held on 29 March, Dobridor took the rostrum and censured Lupu "for compiling the electoral list, from which the youth's representatives were omitted"; he and his followers then moved to expel from the hall envoys of the Social Democratic Party, who had wanted to present their homages to Mihalache. This episode appeared to be part of a centrist consolidation, with several party chapters signaling to Mihalache that they did not accept Lupu. Dobridor, who formed disciplinary committees to censure those who moved too far to the left, explained that he had no personal animosity toward Lupu, but that he detested his circle of friends, as "men of dubious morality."

This looming schism was covered by the far-right National Christian Party (PNC) as a conflict between nationalism and "Jewish Bolshevism". However, the same observers noted that Dobridor did not want to leave the PNȚ, and contended that his nationalism was meant to cover his "political toadyism". Contrarily, the Iron Guard's Toma Vlădescu described him as "the youthful symbol of a clean Romania", whose adversaries included Lupu (labeled a "drunkard" by Vlădescu) and the "Semitic newspapers". Dobridor was eventually expelled from the PNȚ on 23 April 1937, with I. C. Petrescu taking over as head of the Bucharest youth organization. According to a detailed notice in Gazeta Basarabiei, he was thrown out of the party for his alleged "bad faith", but actually intended to resign. Constantin Argetoianu, of the Agrarian Union Party, commented on this incident in his diary on 12 May:

today's papers have printed a rigmarole under Mr Dobridor's signature as 'leader of the National Peasantist youth', wherein Dr Lupu is being slated, no punches pulled. [...] After the elections, that impulsive politician [Lupu], in his capacity as party leader for Bucharest, had all the leaders of the so-called youth thrown out of the party, one by one. The latter were not intimidated, and answered back. Yet another quarrel inside a party that's being blown apart by all manner of storms.

The poet was followed on his way out by the entire youth branch. In their statement to the press, its members noted that they did not intend to set up a new party, but rather that they would "fight so that the National Peasants' Party continue to uphold the national line." Soon after, Dobridor was rumored to be in pondering the creation of a "True Peasantist Party", by fusing his group into Nicolae Enache's Peasantist Party of Social Harmony (itself active in Olt County). D. I. Cucu, of the PNC paper Țara Noastră, covered the scandal in a June editorial:

[Dobridor and his followers] have dared to feel things in a Romanian way, to weigh in on things with their own Romanian minds, [and] have therefore ignited Mr N. Lupu's wrath. This salaried Jupiter could not tolerate their reminders to Mr I. Mihalache that Peasantism without antisemitism is an inane combination, that Peasantism under kike tutelage is infamy. And so he had them thrown out, precisely because Mr I. Mihalache's party must endure as a political instrument of the Jewish International, for its crushing of nationalism in Romania.

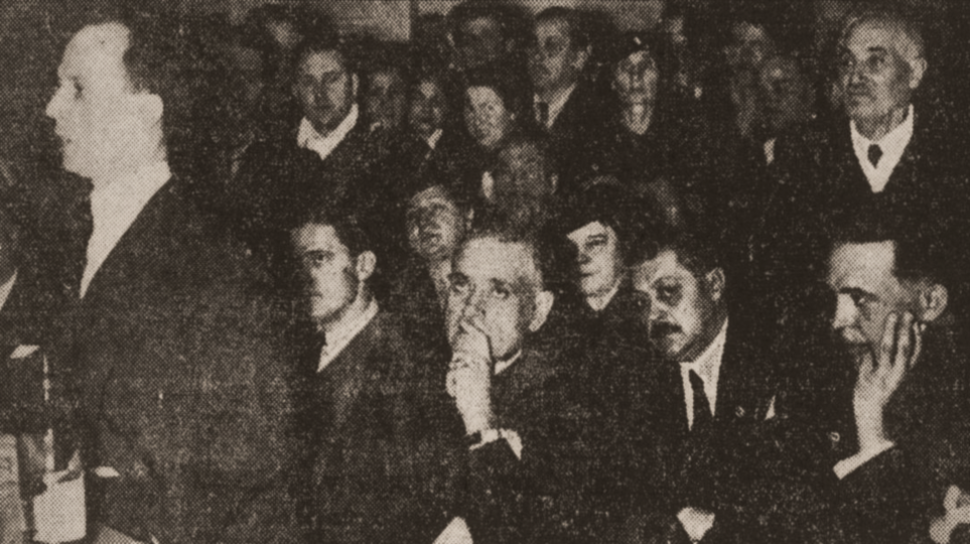
Dobridor speaking at a rally of the National Christian Party on 6 February 1938, the day he was officially inducted by that group

In September, Dobridor was a guest speaker at a rally held by another far-right group, the "Swastika of Fire". In time, he became a welcomed author at Iron Guardist publications such as Porunca Vremii and Sfarmă-Piatră. On 4 November 1937, Porunca Vremii argued that he had been subject to "ostracization" ever since Organizarea minciunii, because he had irritated colleagues who secretly understood that he was right. Nichifor Crainic inducted Dobridor at Gândirea magazine and its associated cultural movement. His first fragments on "the destructive tenets of philosophical Judaism" appeared in that month's issue. Together with Nicolae Crevedia, Crainic and Dobridor presented a Gândirea literary soiree in Craiova, on 22 November. Before the year's end, Dobridor was also being published by the Iron Guard's cultural journal, Decembrie—as noted by sympathetic reviewers at Viața Basarabiei, he and Neagu Rădulescu were not Guard affiliates, but counted as Decembrie's "rather frivolous" contributors. On 6 February 1938, Dobridor and his followers rallied with the then-governing PNC; he himself was promised an eligible position in Muscel County for the scheduled elections of 1938. Three days later, he presided over a political rally, announcing that Muscel was selected because he intended to defeat Mihalache in his own fief. He also chided his rival for his "love of money and of the Jews", noting that Mihalache had betrayed the "peasant program", which the PNC had since agreed to uphold.

== Wartime ==
The 1938 election never took place, since King Carol II staged a self-coup and suspended the political parties, introducing an authoritarian constitution. In January 1939, Dobridor was conferencing for the USO in Târgu Jiu, on "Oltenia's historical calling". He was by then directorial editor at his own weekly journal "of social and national culture", called Presa. His colleagues at Curentul advertised it as a "Western-style" paper with a young and idealistic editorial staff. The National Renaissance Front (FRN) was formed by Carol as a sole official party, and, under corporate statism, the Deputies' Chamber gave representation to the guilds. Dobridor was a candidate of the "intellectual occupations" in Ținutul Olt during the general election of June 1939 (fourth on a list that he shared with George Matei Cantacuzino and Nicolae C. Iovipale). He did not appear among the eight candidates that were eventually elected, but continued to back the FRN policies with Presa. In February 1940, he expressed support for the policy of Romanianization, which established racial quotas in the public administration and the private industry. One of his articles, also taken up in Neamul Românesc, chided Romanians for having wasted themselves on pursuing university diplomas while lucrative trades went to owners of foreign passports. His output of the time included praises to the nationalist ideologue and FRN eminence Nicolae Iorga, whom he described as "the utter incarnation of our national soul".

In September 1940, Carol's regime succumbed to a national crisis, after hostile neighbors, backed by Nazi Germany, had successfully managed to revise the borders: the Soviet Union took Bessarabia and northern Bukovina, while the Kingdom of Hungary took over in Northern Transylvania. The king abdicated and Ion Antonescu stepped in as Conducător, initially in partnership with the Iron Guard. In December 1940, Dobridor's thoughts on the situation were hosted in Curentul: here, he argued in favor of Romanian ethnic precedence to the lost provinces, suggesting that "German science" would eventually prove him right. He returned to Gândirea with an essay on "national mysticism", wherein he admitted that Crainic and the Iron Guard had been right to connect nationalism and Orthodoxy. This merger of identities, he now proposed, was the only correct way to discern the Romanians' "national destiny". In early 1941, Dobridor published the first and only volume of his core philosophical work, Decăderea dogmelor ("A Decay of Dogmas"), claiming to expose Jewish contributions in "dissolving European culture", which was immediately after translated into German. The author focused his virulent critique on Henri Bergson, Émile Durkheim, Albert Einstein, Sigmund Freud, Karl Marx, and Otto Weininger, describing each as embodying a particular assault on the tenets of Christianity and on the inheritance of the Greco-Roman world. The book stated his belief in the Jewish nature of Freemasonry, as well as his claim that Bergson's sister, Moina Mathers, was the secret founder of Theosophy. Jewish historian Hary Kuller identifies this volume as one of the "racist works [...] aiming to 'demonstrate' the Jew's congenital evilness", and rates Dobridor himself as a "scribe".

Antonescu's tactic, meanwhile, was to cement Romania's alliance with Germany and the Axis powers, manifested when, in June 1941, Romania took up arms against the Soviet Union, as part of Operation Barbarossa. Dobridor joined the war effort on the Eastern Front as both a soldier in the Romanian Land Forces and a war correspondent for the national press. He was present during the Romanian-and-German expedition into Bessarabia, and reported seeing atrocities committed by the retreating Red Army (such as a deserter having been crucified, his eyes gouged out). He then followed the troops as they advanced from Naslavcea into southern Ukraine. In a reportage for Realitatea Ilustrată, he discussed the locals' enthusiasm at greeting Romanian troops, and their turning on Soviet Jewish politruks. Dobridor boasted having seen one of these Jews, "sobbing with such fear of death that it made one sick", being "torn to pieces" by peasants. In August 1941, at Novoalexandrovka, Dobridor interviewed the historian and former politician Gheorghe I. Brătianu, who had volunteered for service. The interview, published in Curentul, evidenced Brătianu's joy at helping to defend Europe against the "Asiatic hordes", and his respect for Nazi leadership in the war.

By September, Dobridor had returned to Bucharest, where he was co-opted by Antonescu's own Romanianization office, as a "special inspector". He was assigned to the official leisure service, "Combat and Light", where he also had the title of councilor. In March 1942, he was in Craiova, lecturing there about "Romanian contributions to European nationalism". His Cântecul Bugului ("Song of the Bug") was recited by actor Nicolae Brancomir during a festival at the National Theater Bucharest held in June, to mark one year since the start of the war. In January 1943, he was assigned to a commission for assessing the status of Jews in Timiș-Torontal County, replacing I. V. Emilian. He had returned as a journalist, and later in 1943 was editing Poporul newspaper. In March of that year, he was voted into the Bucharest Union of Journalists, as a representative of the same publication. In early 1944, Dobridor published a volume of biographies, Oameni ridicați din țărănime ("Men Lifted Out of the Peasantry"), which gave the public a quick reference regarding the life and work of historical figures such as Tudor Vladimirescu, Mihai Eminescu, and Constantin Dobrescu-Argeș. With the USO having folded in December 1940, he had joined a newly-created general association of Oltenian writers, and was reading from his works at its literary sessions alongside Virgil Carianopol.

== Detainment and death ==
Dobridor was marginalized immediately after the anti-fascist coup of 23 August 1944: on 28 October, the Union of Professional Journalists included him on a list of authors who needed to be "purged" from the guild. In May 1945, the First Groza cabinet barred him from publishing his works as one of 43 men identified as having authored "fascist propaganda" (other figures punished in the same way included Crainic, Romulus Dianu, Constantin Virgil Gheorghiu, Stelian Popescu, and Pamfil Șeicaru). In 1946, his interview with Brătianu was cited as incriminating evidence against the latter by the Romanian Communist Party (PCR). That same year, poet Ștefan Baciu, who had been received into the dissident Social Democratic Party, tried to publish another volume of Dobridor's verse in his own "Yellow Collection", which he put out of Râmnicu Vâlcea; hindered by the looming PCR takeover, Baciu renounced this project and fled the country. Dobridor's poems were still sampled by Stelian Metzulescu in his anthology of Oltenian poetry, which received a mocking review in the communist paper România Liberă.

Formally barred from running or registering to vote in the general election of November 1946, Dobridor witnessed the establishment of a Romanian communist regime. In April 1948, the PCR's magazine, Contemporanul, noted that village libraries still hosted copies of Oameni ridicați din țărănime, despite the book containing "chauvinistic ideas". This journal also dismissed Dobridor as a "former scribe at each and every one of the hooligan papers." Around that time, novelist Cezar Petrescu was entertaining his friends with humorous anecdotes about interwar figures, and once mocked Dobridor, a "diminutive, faint, disgruntled journalist", for his plan to draw the much larger Virgil Potârcă into a fistfight. Dobridor was ultimately arrested in 1954, and spent the following decade as a political prisoner held in Craiova, Jilava, and finally Aiud.

Writer Ștefan Agopian recalls that, as a child in the early 1960s, he had a much older female acquaintance who sympathized with the Iron Guard. She introduced him to a secret stash of fascist books, including some by Dobridor. The former journalist was released in 1964 and allowed to work in menial employment, but continued to test the authorities by giving what Crețu labels as "firebrand anti-communist speeches" in various locales. He was found dead in January 1968 in his Bucharest garret, having been beaten up by unknown assailants; his door had been locked from the outside.

As assessed in the early 1990s by his former colleague Baciu, Dobridor remained entirely forgotten, though some of his texts were rediscovered after the Romanian Revolution of 1989. A Gândirea anthology, curated by Emil Pintea, appeared at Editura Dacia in 1992, but without including any of Dobridor's essays (seen by scholar Nae Antonescu as a defect of that book). The following year, as controversy was spreading regarding Mircea Eliade's time in the Iron Guard, literary historian Cornel Ungureanu brought up his lambasting by Dobridor. As part of this reassesement, he observed that Eliade was at all times more moderate than those who had criticized him from the far-right. In 1999, Răzvan Codrescu reissued Dobridor's 1941 volume, adding his own foreword. Dobridor's attacks on Eliade were republished in Mircea Handoca's 2000 anthology, "Dosarul" Eliade, inviting in discussions about his contribution as one of Eliade's first detractors.
