= List of universities in Romania =

There are a number of post-secondary educational institutions in Romania. Public universities, owned and operated by the state, emerged as such in the 1860s. Private universities, except for a handful of theological seminaries, were set up after the Romanian Revolution of 1989.

== Public institutions of higher education ==
Institution	Location	Est.
1 Decembrie 1918 University, Alba Iulia	Alba Iulia	1991
Aurel Vlaicu University of Arad	Arad	1990
Vasile Alecsandri University of Bacău	Bacău	1961/1990
Henri Coandă Air Force Academy	Brașov	1912/1995
Transylvania University of Brașov	Brașov	1948/1971
Polytechnic University of Bucharest	Bucharest	1818/1864
Technical University of Civil Engineering of Bucharest	Bucharest	1948
Ion Mincu University of Architecture and Urbanism	Bucharest	1897/1952
University of Agronomic Sciences and Veterinary Medicine of Bucharest	Bucharest	1852
University of Bucharest	Bucharest	1694/1864
Carol Davila University of Medicine and Pharmacy	Bucharest	1857
Bucharest Academy of Economic Studies	Bucharest	1913
National University of Music Bucharest	Bucharest	1864
Bucharest National University of Arts	Bucharest	1864
Caragiale National University of Theatre and Film	Bucharest	1954
National University of Physical Education and Sport	Bucharest	1922
National School of Administration and Political Science of Bucharest	Bucharest	1991
Technical Military Academy of Bucharest	Bucharest	1949
Carol I National Defence University	Bucharest	1889
National Academy of Intelligence	Bucharest	1992
Alexandru Ioan Cuza Police Academy	Bucharest	1949/1991
Technical University of Cluj-Napoca	Cluj-Napoca	1920/1948
University of Agricultural Sciences and Veterinary Medicine of Cluj-Napoca	Cluj-Napoca	1869
Babeș-Bolyai University	Cluj-Napoca	1581/1919; 1945/1959
Iuliu Haţieganu University of Medicine and Pharmacy	Cluj-Napoca	1919/1948
Gheorghe Dima National Music Academy	Cluj-Napoca	1919
Art and Design University of Cluj-Napoca	Cluj-Napoca	1925/1950
Ovidius University	Constanța	1961/1990
Maritime University of Constanța	Constanța	1990
Mircea cel Bătrân Naval Academy	Constanța	1872/1990
University of Craiova	Craiova	1947/1965
University of Medicine and Pharmacy of Craiova	Craiova	1970/1999
University of Galați	Galați	1948/1974
Gheorghe Asachi Technical University of Iași	Iași	1813/1937
Iași University of Life Sciences	Iași	1912/1948
Alexandru Ioan Cuza University	Iași	1640/1860
Grigore T. Popa University of Medicine and Pharmacy	Iași	1879/1948
George Enescu National University of Arts	Iași	1860/1948
University of Oradea	Oradea	1990
University of Petroșani	Petroșani	1948/1991
University of Pitești	Pitești	1974/1991
Petroleum-Gas University of Ploiești	Ploiești	1948
Lucian Blaga University of Sibiu	Sibiu	1990
Nicolae Bălcescu Land Forces Academy	Sibiu	1920
Ştefan cel Mare University of Suceava	Suceava	1963/1990
Valahia University of Târgoviște	Târgoviște	1992
Constantin Brâncuși University	Târgu Jiu	1992
George Emil Palade University of Medicine, Pharmacy, Science and Technology	Târgu Mureș	1945
University of Arts of Târgu Mureș	Târgu Mureș	1950
Politehnica University of Timișoara	Timișoara	1920
King Michael I University of Life Sciences	Timișoara	1945
West University of Timișoara	Timișoara	1962
Victor Babeș University of Medicine and Pharmacy, Timișoara	Timișoara	1945

== Private institutions of higher education ==
=== Accredited ===
Institution	Location	Est.
Vasile Goldiș Western University of Arad	Arad	1990
George Bacovia University of Bacău	Bacău	1992
George Barițiu University of Brașov	Brașov	1990
Dimitrie Cantemir Christian University	Bucharest	1990
Titu Maiorescu University	Bucharest	1990
Nicolae Titulescu University	Bucharest	1990
Romanian-American University	Bucharest	1991
Hyperion University	Bucharest	1990
Spiru Haret University	Bucharest	1991
Bioterra University	Bucharest	1990
Ecological University of Bucharest	Bucharest	1990
Gheorghe Cristea Romanian University of Arts and Sciences	Bucharest	1990
Athenaeum University	Bucharest	1990
Artifex University	Bucharest	1992
Roman Catholic Theological Institute of Bucharest	Bucharest	1991
Baptist Theological Institute of Bucharest	Bucharest	1921/1947
Pentecostal Theological Institute	Bucharest	2008
Adventus University of Cernica	Cernica	1924/1951
Bogdan Vodă University of Cluj-Napoca	Cluj-Napoca	1992
Sapientia University	Cluj-Napoca	2001
Andrei Șaguna University of Constanța	Constanța	1992
Danubius University	Galați	1992
Petre Andrei University of Iași	Iași	1990
Apollonia University	Iași	1991
Mihail Kogălniceanu University of Iași	Iași	1990
Drăgan European University of Lugoj	Lugoj	1992
Agora University	Oradea	2000
Emanuel University of Oradea	Oradea	1990
Partium Christian University	Oradea	1990
Constantin Brâncoveanu University	Pitești	1991
Commercial Academy of Satu Mare	Satu Mare	1997
Romanian-German University of Sibiu	Sibiu	1998
Dimitrie Cantemir University of Târgu Mureș	Târgu Mureș	1991
Tibiscus University of Timișoara	Timișoara	1991

=== Temporarily authorised to function ===
Institution	Location	Est.
Vatra Art University of Baia Mare	Baia Mare	
British Romanian University	Bucharest	2000
Pro-Universitate Media Foundation	Bucharest	
Bucharest University of Sciences, Arts and Trades	Bucharest	2001
Școala Normală Superioară București	Bucharest	2001
University of Wales, Romania	Bucharest	2001
Ioan I. Dalles Popular University	Bucharest	
Lumina – The University of South-East Europe	Bucharest	2010
Protestant Theological Institute of Cluj	Cluj-Napoca	1948
Tomis University	Constanța	
Mihai Viteazul University	Craiova	
Traian Ecological University of Deva	Deva	
Iași Institute of European Studies	Iași	1999
Roman Catholic Theological Institute of Iași	Iași	1886
Roman Catholic Franciscan Theological Institute of Roman	Roman	1990
Commercial Academy Foundation of Satu Mare	Satu Mare	
Alma Mater University of Sibiu	Sibiu	
Ioan Slavici University of Timișoara	Timișoara	
Millennium University Foundation of Timișoara	Timișoara	

=== Temporarily authorised to function and undergoing accreditation ===
Institution	Location	Est.
Romanian Banking Institute	Bucharest	
Institute of Business Administration in Bucharest	Bucharest	
Pentecostal Theological Institute of Bucharest	Bucharest	1976
Avram Iancu University	Cluj-Napoca	1992

== Former universities ==
Institution	Location	Type	Est.	Until	Notes
Roman Catholic Theological Institute of Alba Iulia	Alba Iulia	private	1945	2007	
Northern University	Baia Mare	public	1991	2012	Became North University Centre of the Technical University of Cluj-Napoca
Ștefan Gheorghiu Academy	Bucharest	public	1945	1989	
Gheorghe Zane University	Iași	private	1996	2013	Absorbed into the Petre Andrei University of Iași
Eftimie Murgu University of Reșița	Reșița	public	1992	2020	Became Reșița University Centre of the Babeș-Bolyai University of Cluj-Napoca
Mihai Eminescu University of Timișoara	Timișoara	private	1992	2014	

== See also ==
- Lists of universities and colleges by country
- Education in Romania
