= UMF =

UMF may stand for:

== Music ==
- Ultra Music Festival, an annual music festival that takes place in Miami
- "UMF", the eighth track on Duran Duran (1993 album)

== Organizations ==
- United Minorities Front, Assam, a political party in Assam
- University of Maine at Farmington
- University of Michigan–Flint
- The acronym of Universitatea de Medicină și Farmacie (University of Medicine and Pharmacy), the name of several universities in Romania:
  - University of Medicine and Pharmacy of Bucharest
  - University of Medicine and Pharmacy of Cluj-Napoca
  - University of Medicine and Pharmacy of Craiova
  - University of Medicine and Pharmacy of Iaşi
  - University of Medicine and Pharmacy of Târgu Mureş
  - University of Medicine and Pharmacy of Timişoara

== Other ==
- Underground mine fire
- Universal Message Format, an XML dialect for message passing
- Unique Manuka Factor, a grading system for Manuka honey
