= Universitatea Craiova =

Universitatea Craiova may refer to:

- University of Craiova, an educational institution in Craiova
- CS Universitatea Craiova, a first division football club from Craiova
- FC U Craiova 1948, a fourth division football club from Craiova
