= Mioara Mantale =

Romanian politician (born 1967)

- Born: October 3, 1967 (age 58); Iași, Socialist Republic of Romania
- Education: Petre Andrei University of Iași; Lucian Blaga University of Sibiu; National University of Political Studies and Public Administration
- Occupation: Politician

Mioara Mantale (born October 3, 1967) is a Romanian politician and the subprefect of Bucharest Municipality. A member of the Democratic Party (PD) and its successor the Democratic Liberal Party (PDL), she is the first-ever female prefect of Bucharest, a mandate she held between 2005 and 2007.

== Biography ==
Born in Iași, Mantale graduated in 1986 from the Mihail Kogălniceanu High School in Vaslui, and attended the Petre Andrei University's Faculty of Law before taking her graduation degree from Lucian Blaga University of Sibiu in 1996. In 1994, she specialized in Financial Advising, and, in 2003, she took a Business Language Certificate in English. She took additional Master's degrees in Romanian and International Law (from the Ecological University of Bucharest, 2005) and in Local Public Administration (from the SNSPA, 2006), as well as attending lectures at the Carol I National Defence University in 2006.

Between 1996 and 2005, Mioara Mantale worked as a Law Adviser for the International Bank of Religions branch in Iași, and later for the central offices of Bancorex, Allianz Romania, and a stock broker firm in Bucharest. In 2000, she was elected to the General Council of Bucharest, serving as member of its Judicial and Economic Committee until 2002.

In 2002–2004, she was a civil society representative on the Bucharest Territorial Authority for Public Order. Reelected to the General Council in 2004, Mantale was its president until 2005, while serving as President of the Territorial Authority, before being appointed Prefect.

In August 2007, she was dismissed from her office, being instead appointed Subprefect of Bucharest. She was dismissed from that office in July 2010, being named a government inspector.

On 24 August 2011 she was appointed consul at the Romanian Consulate General in Strasbourg by the then-Prime-Minister Emil Boc, a post she held until 4 April 2013.
