= List of botanical gardens in Romania =

Botanical gardens in Romania have collections consisting entirely of Romania native and endemic species; most have a collection that include plants from around the world. There are botanical gardens and arboreta in all states and territories of Romania, most are administered by local governments, some are privately owned.

- Arad Botanical Garden
- Arad Eutopia Gardens
- Bucharest Botanical Garden
- Cluj-Napoca Botanical Garden
- Craiova Botanical Garden
- Galați Botanical Garden
- Iași Botanical Garden
- Jibou Botanical Garden
- Târgu-Mureș Botanical Garden
- Therme București
- Timișoara Botanical Garden
- Tulcea Botanical Garden
