= UMK =

UMK may refer to:

== Universities ==
- Nicolaus Copernicus University in Toruń in Poland
- Universiti Malaysia Kelantan in Malaysia
- University of Mediterranean Karpasia in Cyprus
- Mihail Kogălniceanu University of Iași in Romania

== Other organisations ==
- TV Miyazaki, a television station in Miyazaki Prefecture, Japan

== Events ==
- Uuden Musiikin Kilpailu, a musical competition in Finland
