= Constantin Brâncuși University of Târgu Jiu =

Coordinates: 45.039707°N 23.271209°E

Constantin Brâncuşi University of Târgu Jiu
- Universitatea „Constantin Brâncuși” din Târgu Jiu
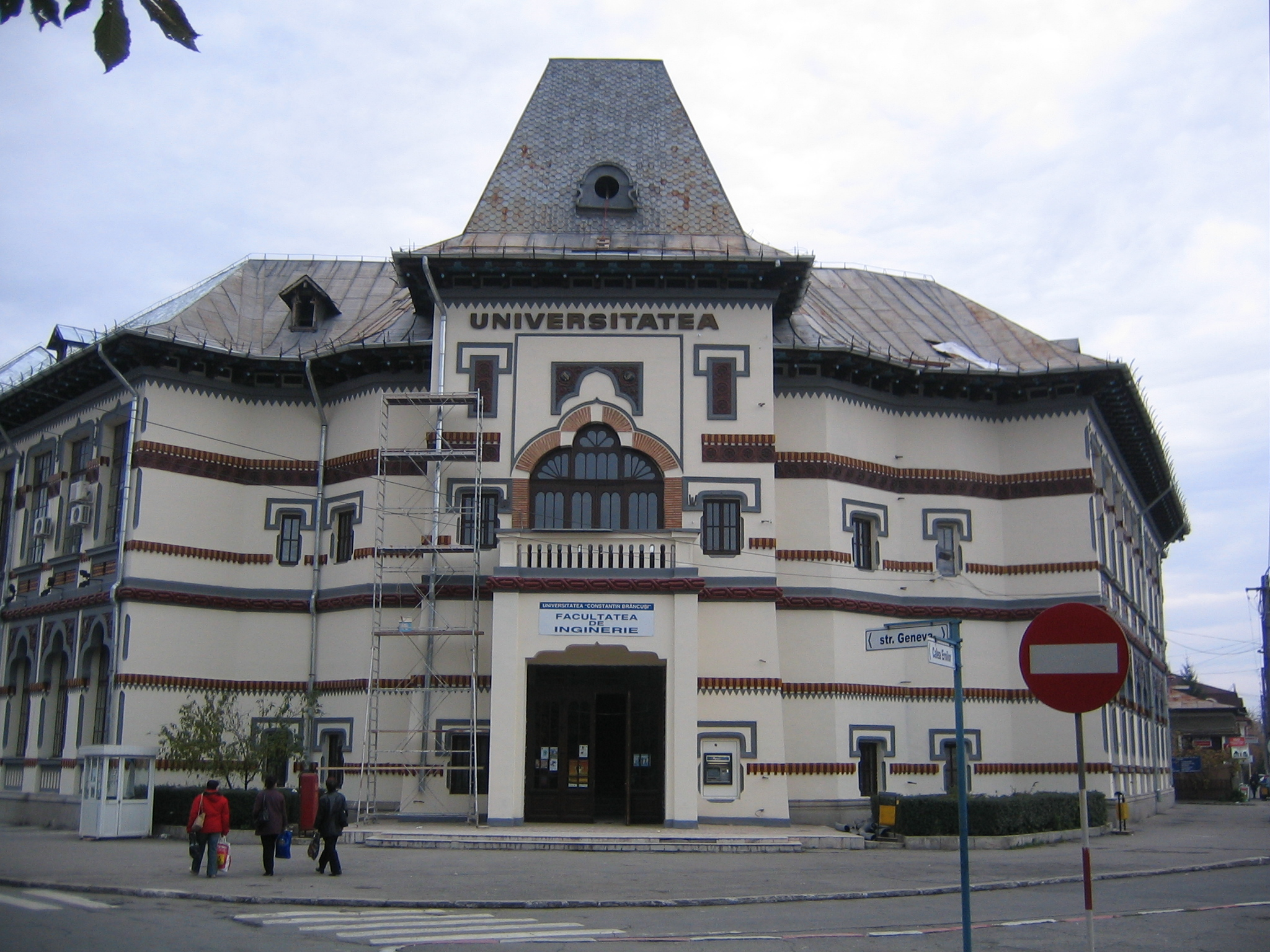
- Interactive map of Constantin Brâncuşi University of Târgu Jiu

General information
- Location: Târgu Jiu, Romania

Website
- www.utgjiu.ro

Constantin Brâncuși University of Târgu Jiu (Romanian: Universitatea „Constantin Brâncuși” din Târgu Jiu) is an accredited higher education institution of public interest, with legal personality and non-profit character, established in accordance with the legal provisions, according to the Romanian Government Decision no. 288 / 01.06.1992, and operates on the basis of the principles of university autonomy and academic freedom, under the coordination of the Ministry of National Education - central specialized authority. Constantin Brâncuși University of Târgu-Jiu is a university concerned, especially, in offering young people the chance to choose various study programs, in accordance with the requirements of the highly qualified labor market. Prior to 1992 it offered technology degrees as part of University of Craiova.

== Historic ==
Since the establishment of the university, the educational offer has experienced a marked diversification, in order to meet the training needs of young people, as well as the requirements identified for the professional insertion of graduates. Thus, Constantin Brâncuși University today has 23 study programs for the undergraduate and 21 master's degree programs. The significant efforts made to diversify the educational offer have been corroborated with those for the development of the material base, the institutional infrastructure and the human resource, in order to ensure competitive and qualitative conditions, related to the requirement of European standards.

== Faculties And Academic Departments ==
The university is organized in four faculties and two departments:

- Faculty of Engineering
- Faculty of Education, Law and Public Administration
- Faculty of Economics
- Faculty of Health and Behavioral Sciences
- Department of Teacher Training
- Research And Development Department

== International Academic Cooperation ==
Starting with 2008, the Constantin Brâncuși University of Târgu-Jiu was awarded the Erasmus University Charter. Therefore, through the Erasmus Mobility Program - under the Lifelong Learning Program (LLP), students or masters have been able to study at other European universities, under conditions of mutual recognition of competencies. From the academic year 2014-2015, Constantin Brâncuşi University organizes mobilities within the Erasmus + program. Constantin Brâncuși University has concluded bilateral Erasmus agreements with important universities in European countries such as: Germany, France, Portugal, Italy, Czech Republic, Poland, Greece, Slovenia, Spain, Turkey.
