= Mile Cărpenișan =

Romanian journalist (1975–2010)

Mile Cărpenișan (August 23, 1975 – March 22, 2010) was a war correspondent who covered the wars in Iraq, Kosovo and the effects of the 2004 tsunami in Asia. He died due to a septic shock at the age of 34.

== Biography ==
Cărpenișan was born in Timișoara into a family of Serbian origins. He studied at the city's Dositej Obradovici Serbian High School. Afterwards, he went to the University of Craiova, to the Faculty of Management. He also made an intensive 4-year specialization in audiovisual media in Lyon, France.

Cărpenișan debuted in newspapers and continued his career as a local correspondent for Antena 1. He worked for more than ten years as a reporter for Antena 1 and Antena 3, being one of the first Romanian international correspondents. He became well known for his numerous reports about the Iraq War, the Kosovo War, the revolution in Belgrade, the effects of the tsunami in Indonesia and floods in Banat and Moldova.

While in Iraq, Cărpenișan played a major role during the seizure of three Romanian correspondents in Baghdad: Marie Jeanne Ion, Sorin Miscoci and Eduard Ovidiu Ohanesian.

In 2009 he left Antena 1 and he became a freelancer. That year, he married a Romanian journalist called Ramona. They created a travel agency promoting Montenegro.

Mile Cărpenișan died the 22 March 2010, due to a boil after being in coma because of a septic shock. He died at the Timișoara County Hospital and was buried in his hometown.

=== Mile Cărpenișan's Challenge ===
Known as an altruist, Cărpenișan created "Mile Cărpenișan’s Challenge". This challenged people to do one good thing each day for a week.

Two weeks before his death, Cărpenișan was working to fundraise for a bone marrow transplant for Daniel Raduta, a young man who was dying of leukemia.

== Posthumous recognition ==
Romanian president Traian Băsescu posthumously awarded Cărpenișan the National Order ‘Faithful Service’ in Knight Degree. Additionally, the deputy mayor of Timișoara, Sorin Grindeanu, made him an honorary citizen of the city.

The Romanian Minister of Defence, Gabriel Oprea, said: "He was a man of high value, a strong and respected voice among the elite of Romanian war correspondents, a journalist that did his noble job with outstanding courage. Through repeated presence in conflict zones alongside Romanian soldiers, he became a veritable brother in arms, a rightful member of the Romanian Army’s great family".

== Professional experience ==
- 1993 – First place in the international literary contest "Mladi knizevnik-Donij Milanovac" with his "Life behind bars" – an essay inspired upon the life of his father, a former political prisoner. The work was published in Yugoslavia
- 1995 – Participated in the movie Timișoara without water, which was presented at the international documentary film festival FILMFEST Zlatibor. The film achieved fourth place of ninety-seven
- 1996 – Way of War – documentary of 20 episodes made after a shift in the conflict in Croatia and later Bosnia-Herzegovina
- 1997 – Traveler in Wonderland, a ten-episode documentary made in Africa
- 1997 – I met happy gypsies, a documentary which won the Soros Foundation award in a conference about intercultural and tolerance
- 1999 – Correspondence about miners, for Antena 1
- 1999 – Cărpenișan was the only Romanian reporter in the front of Kosovo from the first to the last day.
- 2000 – Correspondence from the scene about the war in Yugoslavia
- 2001 – Reports and correspondence from the scene about the arrest of Slobodan Milosevic
- 2003 – Reports and correspondence about the assassination of Serbian Prime Minister Zoran Dindic
- 2003 – Correspondence and reports from the front in Baghdad, where he went as an embedded journalist within the United States Army
- 2003 – Cărpenișan wrote a report in depth about the Romanian women kidnapped by traffickers of human beings with images and exclusive interviews.
- 2004 – He covered the conflicts in Belgrade and Kosovo, and broadcast live reports about fights between Albanians and Serbs in the territory.
- 2004 – Cărpenișan published a complete report about trafficking networks that operate in Bucharest-Timișoara-Belgrade-Italy.
- 2004 – Cărpenișan became the only journalist who had achieved an interview with Miron Cozma
- 2005 – He became the first Romanian journalist at the tsunami in Sri Lanka, Thailand and Indonesia
- 2005 – Cărpenișan was the only Romanian TV reporter in Baghdad at the time of the journalists’ kidnapping
- 2005 – He covered floods in Banat and in Moldova
- 2006 – Cărpenișan covered the Kosovo riots
- 2006 – Cărpenișan provided an exclusive insight about Budapest's street fights
- 2007 – Cărpenișan He covered new conflicts in Budapest
- 2007 – Cărpenișan filmed from the front of the war in Kosovo

Between 1998 and 2007, Cărpenișan produced about 60,000 news and reports.
