= Gheorghe Zane =

Romanian economist and historian (1897–1978)

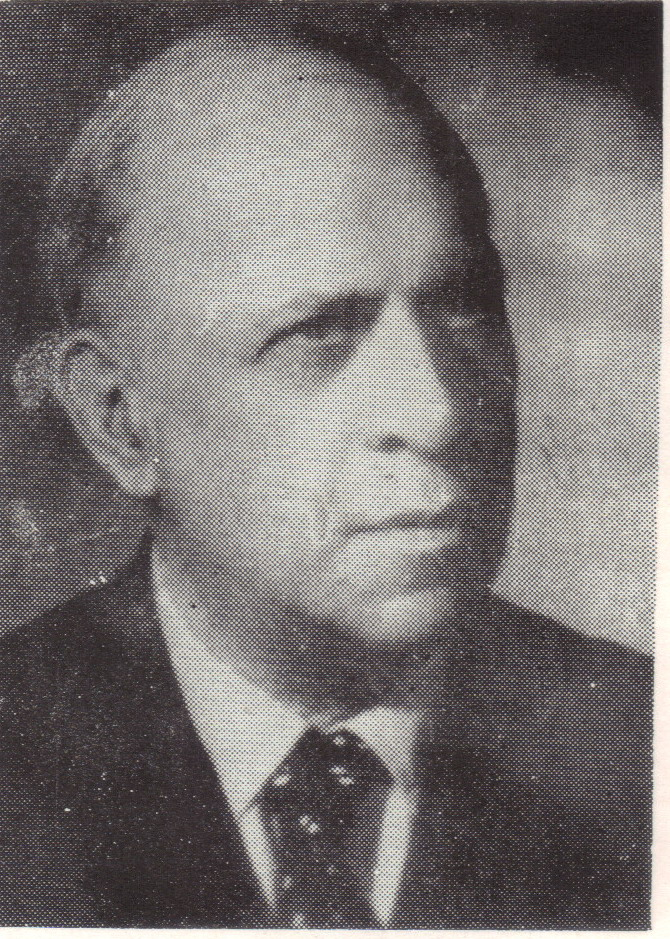
Romanian economist Gheorghe Zane

Gheorghe Zane (April 11, 1897 – May 22, 1978) was a Romanian economist and historian.

Born in Galați, he attended Vasile Alecsandri National College before enrolling in the law faculty of the University of Iași. He graduated from that institution in 1920, earning a doctorate from the University of Bucharest in 1923. His first teaching job, from 1921 to 1924, was at the agriculture faculty in Iași, where his courses dealt with political economy. Securing a post as associate professor in the same subject at the Iași law faculty in 1924, he advanced to full professor in 1929, teaching the history of economic doctrines. The following year, he switched to teaching political economy and finance, continuing to do so until 1945. From 1945 to 1948, he taught political economy and rationalization at the Bucharest Polytechnic Institute. Subsequently, after the onset of the Communist regime, he worked at Bucharest's Economic Research Institute. He became a corresponding member of the Romanian Academy in 1965 and was promoted to titular member in 1974. He died in Bucharest.

The author of a copious body of work, he is considered to have introduced to Romania the systematic study of the history of economic concepts. In addition, he researched political economy, economic history and public finance, and edited the complete works of Nicolae Bălcescu. An institute of the Romanian Academy dedicated to economic and social science research, located in Iași, is named after Zane. Gheorghe Zane University, a private institution, functioned in the same city between 1996 and 2013.
