= Iași Institute of European Studies =

Ștefan Lupașcu Institute of European Studies
- Type: Private
- Established: 1999
- Location: Iaşi, Romania
- Website: http://www.univ-st-lupascu.ro/

The Ștefan Lupașcu Institute of European Studies is a private university in Iaşi, Romania. Founded in 1999, it was named in honor of the Romanian philosopher Stéphane Lupasco.

== Structure ==
- Public Administration
- Management
- Accounting and Information Systems
