= Commercial Academy of Satu Mare =

- Academia Comercială
- Seal of the Commercial Academy of Satu Mare
- Type: Private
- Established: 1997
- Endowment: $2,500,000
- Rector: Conf. univ. dr. Andreica Romulus
- Administrative staff: 40
- Students: 1,000
- Location: Satu Mare, Romania
- Website: www.academiacomerciala.ro

Commercial Academy of Satu Mare is a university founded in 1997 in Satu Mare, Romania, with branches in several other counties. The university is currently constructing a new campus on a 8,500 m^{2} (91,000 sq ft) plot located in the largest park in Satu Mare, the Garden of Rome that was completed in 2010.

== Academic specialization ==
- Finance and banking
- Management
- Accountancy and Informatics
- Economy of Commerce, Tourism and Services
- International Economic Relations
