= University of Wales, Romania =

The Foundation for the Promotion of European Education F.I.N.E. – University of Wales, Romania (Romanian: Fundația Pentru Promovarea Învățământalui European F.I.N.E – Universitatea Wales România), a university located in Bucharest, Romania, was established in 2001 and received authorisation to function from the Romanian Ministry of Education, Research and Youth in 2003. It is part of the University of Wales. Classes are taught during the day and 3-year degrees in Management and Marketing are awarded.
