= Gheorghe Zane University =

- Type: Private
- Active: 1996–2013 (absorbed into Petre Andrei University)
- Location: Iaşi, Romania
- Website: http://www.universitateazane.ro/

The Gheorghe Zane University was a private university in Iaşi, Romania. Founded in 1996, it was named in honor of the Romanian economist Gheorghe Zane.

In September 2013, Gheorghe Zane University was absorbed into Petre Andrei University of Iași.

== Structure ==
Faculties

- Faculty of Marketing
- Faculty of Management
- Faculty of Public Administration
