= Craiova Botanical Garden =

Coordinates: 44.3243259°N 23.7866594°E

The Craiova Botanical Garden Alexandru Buia (Romanian: Grădina Botanică din Craiova) is a scientific organization where plant specimens are collected from different regions of the country and preserved as reference material, but also as study material for the students of University of Craiova. The garden occupies a large area in the center of the Craiova city, Romania, covering an area delimited by the streets Constantin Lecca (Comuna din Paris) - Obedeanu – Poporului – Renaşterii – Calea Severinului (N. Titulescu) – Iancu Jianu, at an altitude of about 99 m and it is located at latitude 44019’24.3”N and longitude 23047’17.9”E. It is also referred as a local park for the citizens of Craiova and a tourist destination in town.

== History ==
The Botanical Garden of Craiova was founded in 1952 at the initiative and under the guidance of prof. Alexandru Buia (1911–1964). All started when on August 29, 1952, the park "November 7 - Fountain Jianu" (the ground) was assigned to the Agronomic Institute of Craiova (today part of the University of Craiova) in order to start the creation of the future Botanical Garden.

The initial goal was to provide the students of the Faculty of profile (agronomy and horticulture) with training material as needed, especially for the newly created Agronomic Institute of Craiova (1948). Beside the broadening of the scientific base for the researchers and teachers, it also aimed to allow visitors to get in contact with the high variability of the plant world.

On March 13, 2002, the College Senate of University of Craiova endorsed the decision to name the Botanical Garden "Alexandru Buia" as token of appreciation to prof. Buia, all this during the celebration of 50 years of its foundation.

== Gallery ==
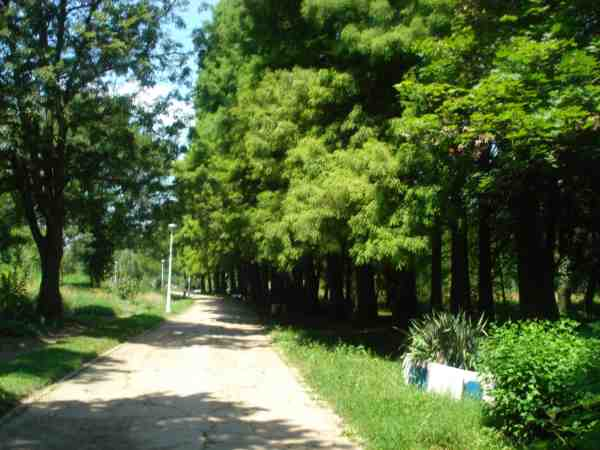
Taxodium distichum (L.) L.C.M. Rich tree, path in Botanical Garden of Craiova

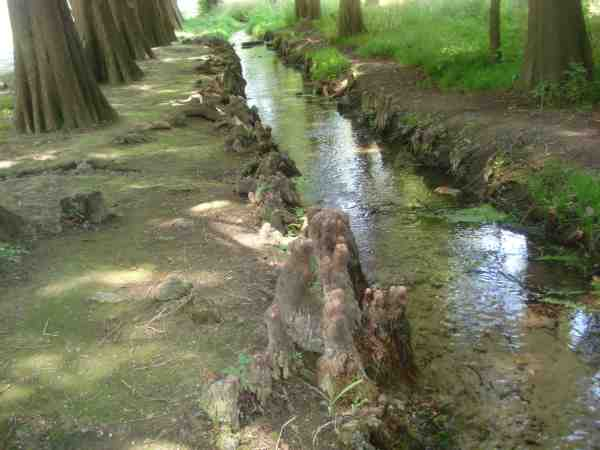
Taxodium distichum (L.) L.C.M. Rich. along the river

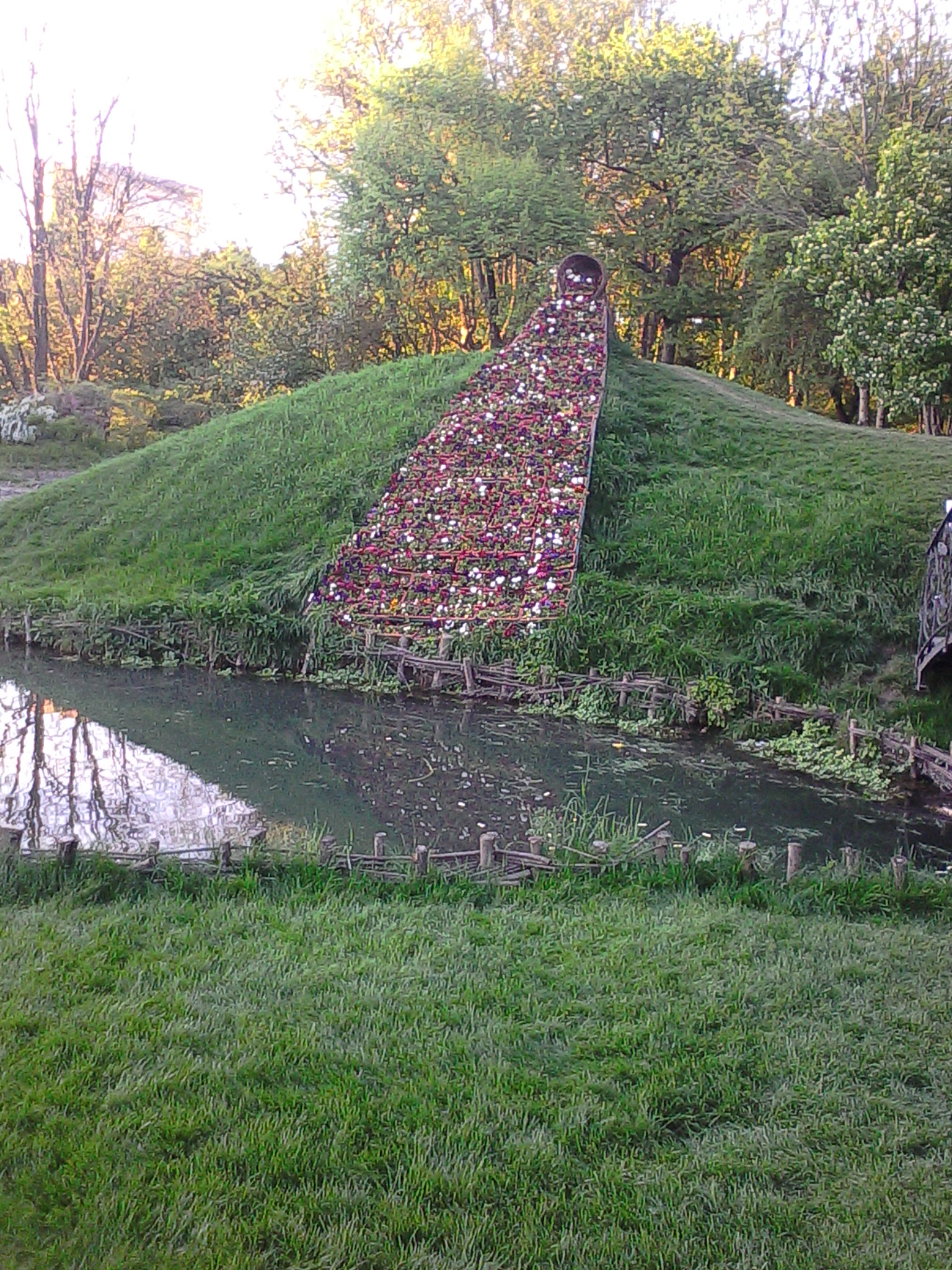

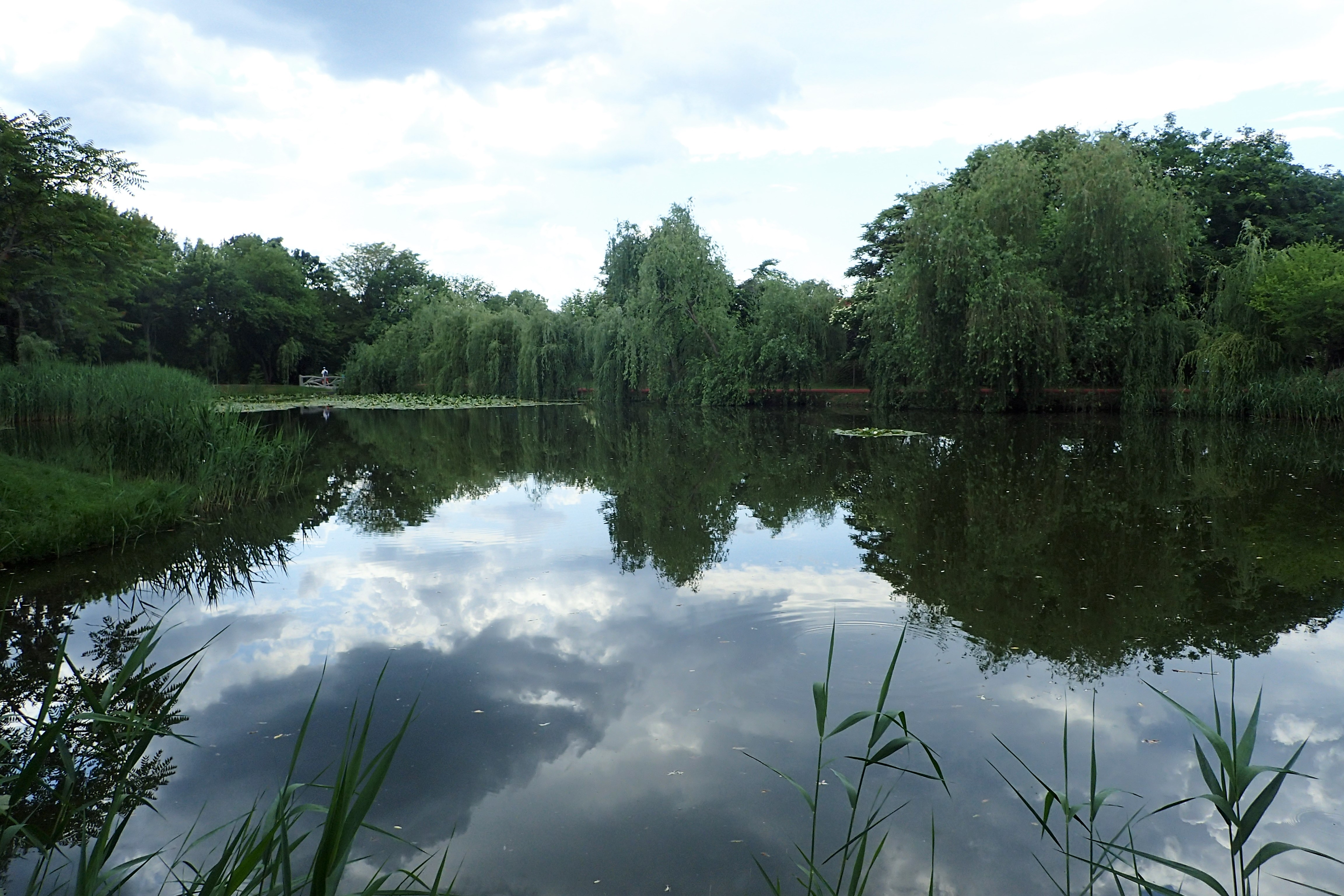

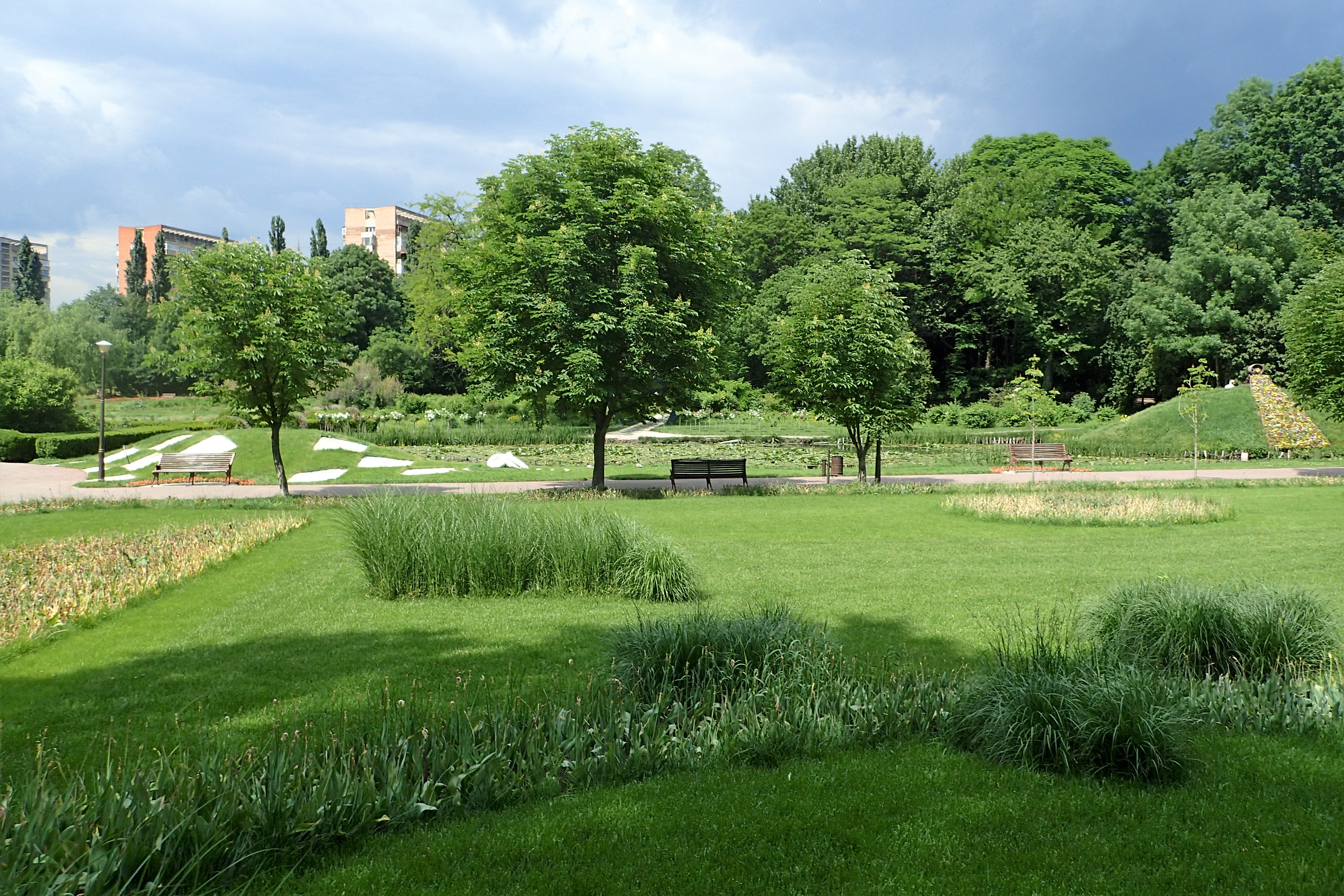

== See also ==
- List of botanical gardens
- University of Craiova
