= École supérieure d'ingénieurs en informatique et génie des télécommunications =

School in Villejuif, France

Coordinates: 48°25′34″N 2°44′38″E

ESIGETEL (École supérieure d'ingénieurs en informatique et génie des télécommunications) was founded in 1986 by the Melun Chamber of Commerce. Most students joining ESIGETEL follow the traditional path to the Grandes écoles and come from preparatory classes (two years) and graduate in three years.

ESIGETEL is in the vicinity of Villejuif, France and is a member of the Polytechnicum of Marne la Vallée.

== Curriculum ==
ESIGETEL has been focused on teaching new technologies in the fields of telecommunications, networking, information systems, and computer science since its inception. The three-year curriculum covers six primary domains in the first and second years:

- Computer science
- Networks
- Mathematics and signal processing
- Electronics
- Economy
- Languages

and four options in the third year:

- Embedded system
- Software systems and networks
- Mobile & Radio Communications
- System & Network Administration & Architecture

== External links (French) ==
=== Official school sites ===
- Official school website
- Site du gala
- The School's IRC server, member of the GeekNode network

=== School student sites ===
- le BDE: bureau des élèves
- la SCER (la Junior-Entreprise)
- L'association sportive de Lafeymas (bureau des sports)
- Association 4L Clan qui participe au 4L Trophy
- Association voile Sillage
- Club BD/manga
- AAEE (Association des Anciens Elèves de l'ESIGETEL)
- Club Robotique de l'ESIGETEL
