= Artifex University =

University in Bucharest, Romania

Artifex University of Bucharest is a private higher education institution. It was established in 1992 and accredited in 2005. The university traces its history to an institution founded in 1919.

It is governed by a Senate and has two faculties, the Faculty of Finance and Accounting and the Faculty of Management and Marketing. The language of instruction is Romanian. The institution provides both bachelor's and master's degrees. In 2021, the university awarded 377 bachelor's degrees, roughly half of the graduates continued their education in a master's program.
