= University of Medicine and Pharmacy of Craiova =

Coordinates: 44.305455°N 23.794175°E

- Universitatea de Medicină și Farmacie Craiova
- Type: public
- Established: 1970/1998
- Rector: Dan- Ionut Gheonea
- Academic staff: 431
- Students: 3,404 (2011-2012)
- Undergraduates: 2,988
- Postgraduates: 416
- Location: Craiova, Romania
- Campus: Urban
- Website: www.umfcv.ro

The University of Medicine and Pharmacy of Craiova (Romanian: Universitatea de Medicină şi Farmacie din Craiova, or UMF Craiova) is a tertiary educational institution in the city of Craiova, in south-western Romania.

== History ==
On 10 February 1970, the Craiova Faculty of Medicine was founded as part of the University of Craiova. In 1990, the Dentistry specialization was founded, followed by Pharmacy, in 1996.

In 1998 the University of Medicine and Pharmacy of Craiova was founded, by detachment from the University of Craiova.

== Faculties ==
- Faculty of Medicine
- Faculty of Pharmacy
- Faculty of Dentistry
- Faculty of Nursing

=== Faculty of Medicine ===
The Faculty of Medicine of the University of Craiova is an institution with a well-defined position in the Romanian medical education and an active presence on an international level. It is known as a non-politically involved institution, which is operating on the basis of separation of academic and administrative functions, although the relations between them are well defined. The Faculty of Medicine, is organized into 15 departments which are offering altogether over 77 courses.

The annual number of students exceeds the 1.500, while the teaching personnel, includes over 300 teachers.

The academic year is divided into two semesters with 15 weeks in each of them, with an average of 30 hours per week. Each semester contains one of 30 transferable credits, as it has been defined by the E.C.T.S. . The students are assessed through written and oral exams, which are taking place during sessions contained in the structured curriculum. The optional subjects are completed with a verification test and the credits of these subjects are added to the 30 obligatory credits of each semester.

The studies for the students of the Faculty of Medicine, are completed through the degree examination, which is accredited in all E.U. member countries.

Additionally, graduate students have the option to continue with their residency, masters and doctorate or postgraduate education if they wish to.

The modern academic framework that the Faculty of Medicine is based on, is following the consistently demanding, mission-based medical training as well as the support for a scientific research.

=== Faculty of Pharmacy ===
The specialization of Pharmacy, was founded in 1996 as a part of the Faculty of Medicine of the University of Craiova, and it only became a separate entity in 1998.

The objective of the Faculty of Pharmacy can be summarized as :

- University training of pharmaceutical sciences in accordance with the current level of knowledge
- Ensurance of a continuous postgraduate training of specialists in pharmacy
- Promotion of a pharmaceutical higher education in an international level
- Promotion of a scientific research as the core activity of the teachers through national and international collaborations.

The students graduating from the Faculty of Pharmacy, have multiple possibilities, such as being the pharmacists in hospital pharmacies, public pharmacies, pharmaceutical warehouses, medical representatives, as well as researchers in pharmaceutical institutions. Faculty of Pharmacy offers the possibility to prepare for the following forms of study:

The duration of the course is five years and the curriculum is divided by years, where each year is obtaining 60 credits of the E.C.T.S. . The graduates have the right to practise pharmacy, directly after graduation.

The Faculty of Pharmacy is additionally offering a residency which includes a theoretical and practical training in Clinical and Laboratory Pharmacy, that lasts three years, a master's degree in "Pharmacology and Toxicology", that lasts for one year, as well as PhD studies.

== Research ==
The research center of the university which cost over 17 million euros, is one of the most modern in the country as it was created in 2008. Among the other high technology equipment, the research center has a P.E.T - C.T., a cyclotron facility, a confocal laser endomicroscope, an optical coherence tomograph, as well as a real time P.C.R. device. The publications of the research center only in the last 5 years, are over 100.

== International Collaborations ==
The Faculty of Medicine of the University of Craiova, is collaborating with educational and research institutions from Germany, Italy, Denmark, Moldavia, France, Portugal, Turkey and Greece.

Additionally, it is a member of A.U.F. (Agence universitaire de la Francophonie), A.M.E.E. (Association for Medical Education in Europe), C.I.D.M.E.F. (Conférence Internationale des Doyens et des Facultés de Médecine d'Expression Française), A.M.S.E. (Association of Medical Schools in Europe) and S.I.D.A.-NET (Réseau d'information francophone sur le Sida).

== See also ==
- Craiova
- George Emil Palade
- Nicolae Paulescu
- List of Nobel Laureates in Physiology or Medicine
- Nobel Prize Controversies
