= Mihail Kogălniceanu University of Iași =

Romanian private university founded in 1990

Mihail Kogălniceanu University
- Type: Private
- Established: 1990
- Academic staff: 50
- Students: 800
- Location: Iaşi, Romania
- Website: http://www.umk.ro/

The Mihail Kogălniceanu University is a private university in Iaşi, Romania. Founded in 1990, it was named in honor of the Romanian historian and statesman Mihail Kogălniceanu.

== Structure ==
Faculties

- Faculty of Law
- Faculty of Communication and Public Relations
