= Petre Andrei University of Iași =

- Type: Private
- Established: 1990
- Students: 5000-6000 (2024-2025)
- Location: Iași, Romania
- Website: www.upa.ro

The Petre Andrei University of Iași is a private university in Iași, Romania, founded in 1990. It was named in honor of the Romanian philosopher, and previous Minister of Education, Petre Andrei.

== History ==
In 1990, to commemorate 50 years since Andrei's death, a group of teachers including Andrei's son established the FAPA (Petre Andrei Academic Foundation), an apolitical NGO within which the university was established. The university is a member of EURASHE. It is one of the largest universities in the country, and is the largest university in the region of Moldavia. The university was accredited in 2002 according to the Bologna Process. It is the only fully accredited private university in the country.

In September 2013, Petre Andrei University absorbed Gheorghe Zane University.

Their academic year is split into two semesters, running October to February, and February to June. The university is split into five faculties.

When the university was founded, initially, it was founded with three faculties: Law, Economics and Psychology. The faculty of Political Sciences was added in 1998, and the Faculty of Social Work was founded later. The current rector of the university is Teodora Prelipcan. The vice-rector is Soran Bocanchu.

== Statistics ==
The university is currently ranked 6th in the country. They have an acceptance rate of between 80 and 89%, which is considered high. There are between 5000-6000 students, making this a small-sized university.

The university currently takes part in the Erasmus Programme.

== Structure ==
Faculties

- Faculty of Law
- Faculty of Economics
- Faculty of Psychology and Educational Sciences
- Faculty of Social Work and Sociology
- Faculty of Political and Administrative Sciences

The former building of the university
