= University of Craiova =

Public university located in Craiova, Romania

- Universitatea din Craiova
- Seal of the University of Craiova
- Other name: UCV
- Motto: Vita sine litteris mors est
- Motto in English: Life without literature is death
- Type: Public
- Established: 1947 – establishment 1965 – university status
- Academic affiliations: EUA
- Budget: € 15.98 million (2013)
- Rector: Cezar Ionuț Spînu
- Academic staff: 2,000
- Students: 20,088 (2014)
- Location: 13 Al. I. Cuza Str., 200585 Craiova, Craiova, Romania; 44°19′09″N 23°48′03″E
- Campus: Urban
- Colours: Yellow and white
- Website: www.ucv.ro

University rankings

Regional – Overall
- QS Emerging Europe and Central Asia: 211-220 (2022)

The University of Craiova (Romanian: Universitatea din Craiova) is a public university located in Craiova, Romania. It was founded in 1947, initially with four institutes, in the Palace of Justice of Craiova. It is the largest university in the historical Oltenia province of Romania. It was the last university established in the Kingdom of Romania. It was the fifth university in Romania officially approved by the Ministerial Council of the Socialist Republic of Romania in 1965, with seven faculties: Mathematics, Philology, Electrotechnics, Agriculture, Horticulture, Chemistry and Economics. The university is a member of the European University Association. It currently includes a total of 16 faculties and two colleges for undergraduate and postgraduate programmes.

Professor Cezar Ionuț Spînu has been the university's 13th Rector since 2016. The university is governed by a seven-member Vice-Rector Board.

The university is internationally known for its football club CS Universitatea Craiova.

== History ==
=== Establishment ===
The idea of founding a higher school in Craiova was proposed in the 18th century by Nicolae Bălcescu, the leader of the Wallachian Revolution of 1848. The establishment of the University of Craiova put in a proposal by Ion Heliade Rădulescu in 1848. However, the failure of the Wallachian Revolution of 1848 did not allow an immediate implementation of this plan. Almost a century later, its establishment was approved based on Act 138/25 April 1947 in the Official Bulletin of the Kingdom of Romania.

The Faculty of Agriculture and the Agricultural Institute were established in 1947 and 1948, respectively. The Technical Institute and the Pedagogical Institute were also established in 1951 and 1959, respectively. The Pedagogical Institute of Craiova included four teaching faculties: Philosophy, Mathematics, Physics & Chemistry, and Natural Sciences.

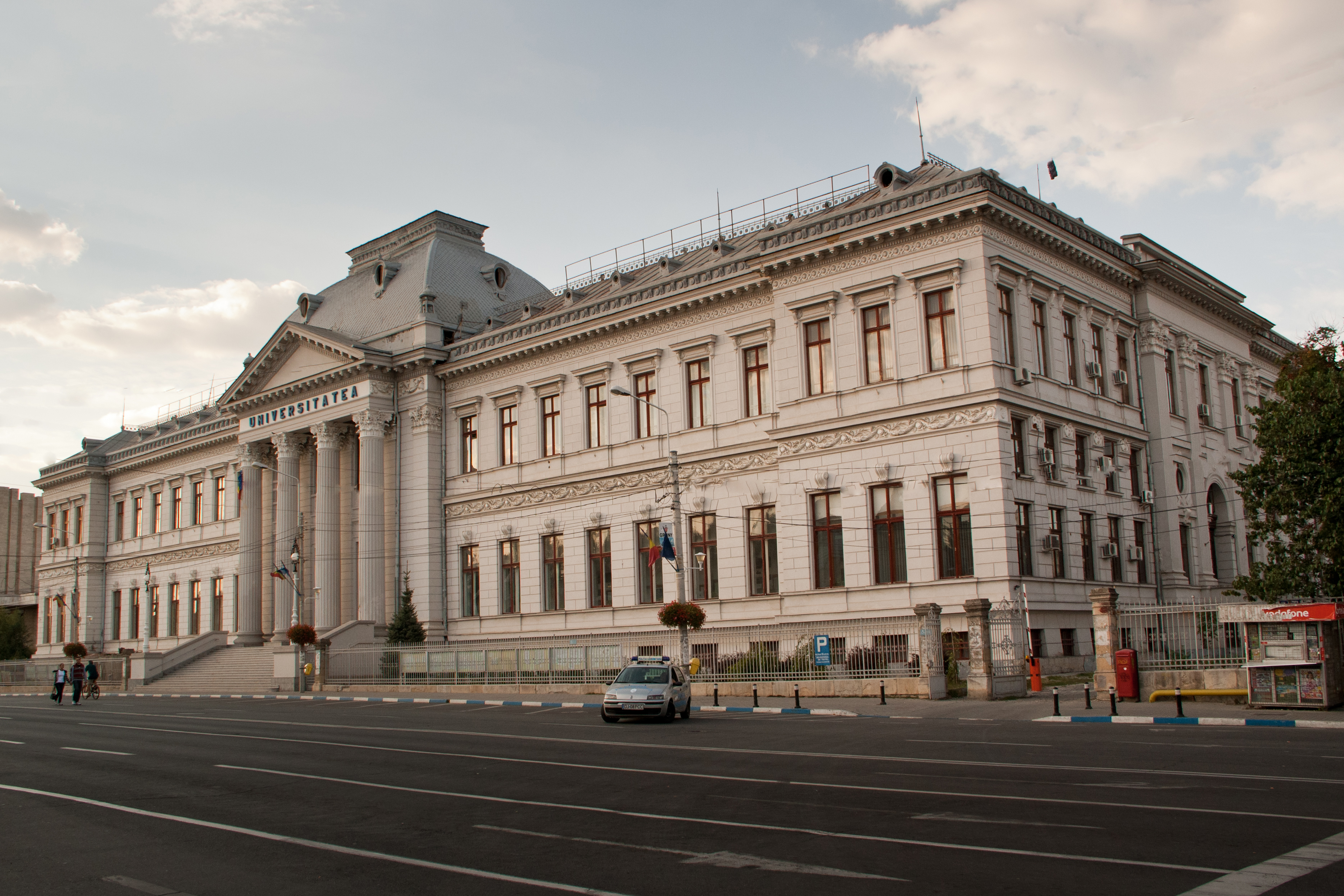
University of Craiova's main building, 2010

=== Status as a university ===
According to the Act No.894/27 August 1965 approved by the Ministerial Council of the Socialist Republic of Romania, the University of Craiova was officially established with seven faculties: Mathematics, Philology, Electrotechnics, Agriculture, Horticulture, Chemistry and Economics. The agreement dissolved the Agricultural Institute, and its facilities were transferred to the Faculty of Agriculture and the Faculty of Horticulture. The Pedagogical Institute of Craiova was divided into the Faculty of Letters, the Faculty of Theology, the Faculty of Social Sciences, and the Faculty of Natural Sciences.

In 1970, the Faculty of Medicine was established. In 1998, it seceded to become the University of Medicine and Pharmacy of Craiova. This has been ranked as one of the best universities for medicine in Romania, and has gained in popularity among students due to its six-year program and no entrance exam.

In 1974, the Faculty of Natural Sciences was divided into the Faculty of Mathematics, the Faculty of Chemistry and the Faculty of Physics. The Faculty of Mathematics later became the Faculty of Mathematics and Natural Sciences in 1991.

By 1989 it consisted of the following faculties:

- Faculty of Science: programs in Mathematics, Informatics and Physics
- Faculty of Letters: programs in Literature and Foreign Languages (Romanian, English, French, Russian)
- Faculty of Economy and Business Administration: programs in Economy, Finance, Accounting, and Agricultural Economy
- Faculty of Medicine: programs in General Medicine
- Faculty of Electrical Engineering: programs in Electrical Engineering, Automation Technology, Computer Science, and Electromechanics
- Faculty of Mechanical Engineering: programs in Mechanical Engineering, Industrial Engineering, and Agricultural Engineering

In 1990, its development was characterized by restructuring administrative offices, introducing new faculties, computerizing administrative process and improving faculties, in order to become a member of the European University Association.

Since 1991, the University of Craiova has had two campuses: Craiova and Drobeta-Turnu Severin. The Craiova campus includes technology, economics, informatics and secretarial work, while the Drobeta-Turnu Severin campus has administration and informatics.

=== Timeline ===
Year	Establishment
1947	Act 138/25 April 1947 in the Official Bulletin of the Kingdom of Romania
1948	Faculty of Agriculture and Agricultural Institute
1951	Technical Institute
1953	Agricultural Institute Botanical Garden
1959	Pedagogical institute
1961	Faculty of Social Sciences
1965	Act No.894/27 August 1965 by the Ministerial Council of the Socialist Republic of Romania
1966	University Library and Student Accommodation
1970	Faculty of Medicine
1972	Museum of the History of Medicine
1977	Faculty of Mechanical Engineering
1979	Alpine Botanical Garden in Parâng Mountains
1981	University IT Centre
1991	Faculty of Law and Administrative Sciences
1992	Faculty of Theology
1994	University Printing House
1995	Faculty of Physical Education and Sports
1996	University TV station
1998	University of Medicine and Pharmacy of Craiova

=== Main building ===
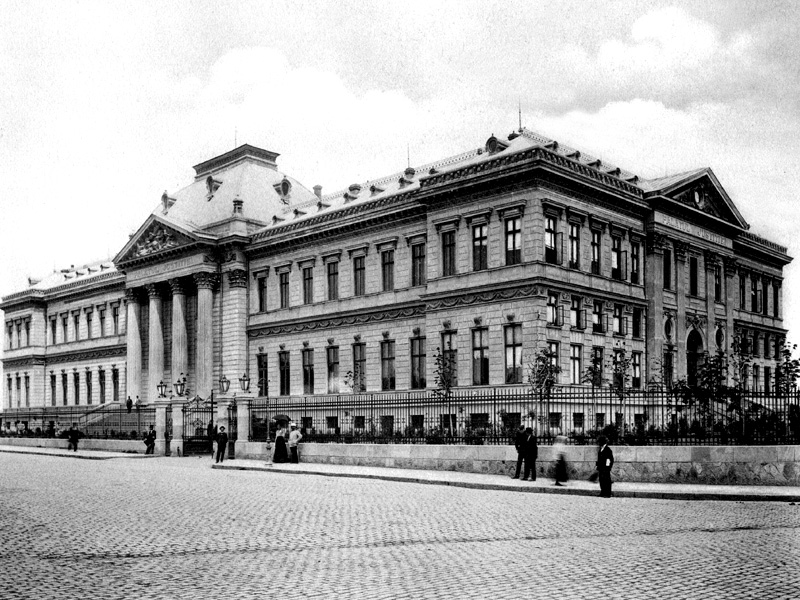
The Palace of Justice of Craiova in 1900, later the main building of the University of Craiova

The main building of the University of Craiova, called wing A, is located in the central region of Craiova. Its construction was finished in 1896, and it was designed as Neoclassical architecture by architect Ion N. Socolescu. It was used for the Palace of Justice of Craiova. After its transference to the university, it had several internal modifications.

The main building is made up of two different U-shaped wings united by a central wing, delimitating the two interior courtyards. The main entrance, the entire exterior, and the interior architecture were designed as classical architecture. In 1972, a new wing was added to the main building, which became the university library. Over the time, the entrances has been relocated, to make easy access to faculties and rooms. Some supplementary spaces have been created through the construction of separating walls.

In 1977, when the main building was reconstructed, some faculties (Agriculture, Mechanical Engineering, and Medicine) were relocated to different buildings.

Since 1998, the classrooms, laboratories, offices have been decorated and modernized. The consolidation of the eastern wing of the main building started in 1996 and was finished in 2002. A cafeteria was built in the basement of the building. In 2002, the Blue Hall and the Central Hall were renovated and modernized.

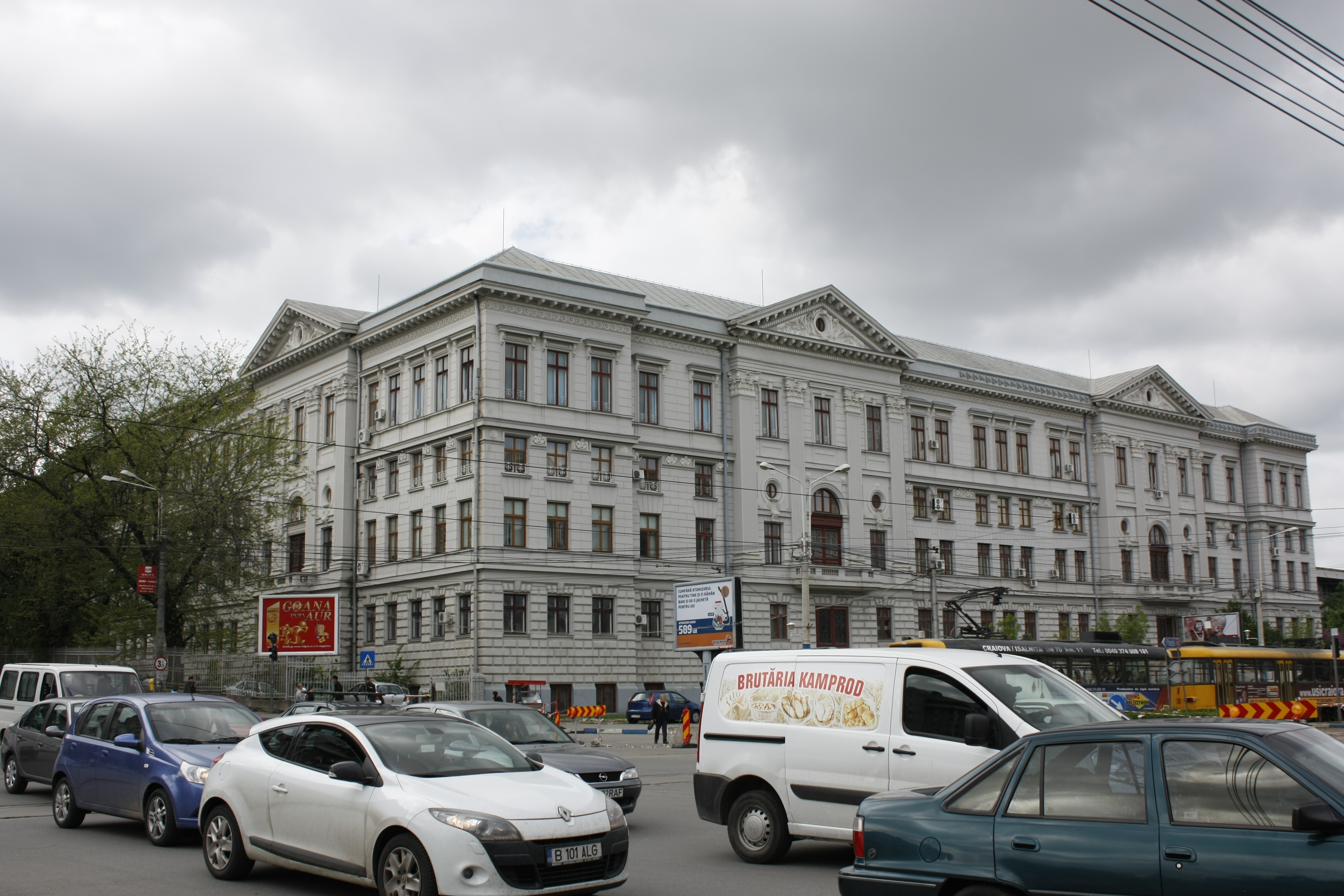
University of Craiova, main building

Currently, 8 of 17 faculties are still located at the main building:

- Faculty of Law and Administrative Sciences
- Faculty of Letters
- Faculty of Science
- Faculty of Horticulture
- Faculty of Social Sciences
- Faculty of Theology
- Faculty of Economy and Business Administration

The main building now includes 35 classrooms, 16 seminar halls, 21 laboratories, and a workshop room.

== Academic profile ==
=== School statistics ===
The number of the students enrolled at the University of Craiova rose dramatically since 1947. It accounted for 4.6% of the total number of Romanian students in 2000. It is 336 students per 10,000 inhabitants, which is larger than the average number of 238 students per 10,000 inhabitants in the country.

The University of Craiova started its PhD programs in 1966. Currently, its PhD programs are supervised by 63 professors. The university has awarded honorary doctorates to more than 60 persons from different countries for their contributions to science and education.

=== Rankings ===
University rankings

Global – Overall
- QS World: 1401+ (2024)
- THE World: 1501+ (2024)

According to the University Ranking by Academic Performance (URAP), the University of Craiova was ranked as 14th in Romania and 1777th in the world in 2014. The SCImago Institutions Rankings (SIR) ranked the University of Craiova as the 11th best research university among Romanian universities and 1661st worldwide in 2014. According to the SCImago Institutions Rankings (SIR), based on data collected between 2007 and 2011, the University of Craiova ranked 1645 in the world, 103 regionally and number 10 in the country by number of publications. Webometrics ranked the University of Craiova as the ninth university in Romania and 1787th in the world in 2014. It was ranked as the 12th university in Romania by the uniRank.org.

== Organisation and structure ==
=== Faculties ===
The University of Craiova comprises fourteen faculties:

- Faculty of Letters
- Faculty of Science
- Faculty of Social Sciences
- Faculty of Theology
- Faculty of Physical Education and Sports
- Faculty of Agriculture
- Faculty of Horticulture
- Faculty of Law and Administrative Sciences
- Faculty of Economy and Business Administration
- Faculty of Electrical Engineering
- Faculty of Mechanical Engineering
- Faculty of Electromechanics Engineering
- Faculty of Automation, Computers and Electronics
- Faculty of Engineering and Management of Technological Systems

=== Colleges ===
- University College of Craiova
- University College of Drobeta Turnu-Severin

=== Affiliated research centers ===
- Research Centre for Artificial Intelligence
- Institution of Electrical and Electronics Technician Engineers (IEETE) Research Centre
- Multimedia Research/Development Centre
- Centre for Innovation and Technology Transfer
- Centre for Dialogue between Sciences and Theology
- Regional Centre for Lifelong Training in Energy
- Department of Technology and Innovation in Advanced ReseArch of Composites (TIARA-C)
- Department of Scientific Research and Programs Management
- Department of Socio-Economic and Cultural Relations

== Facilities ==
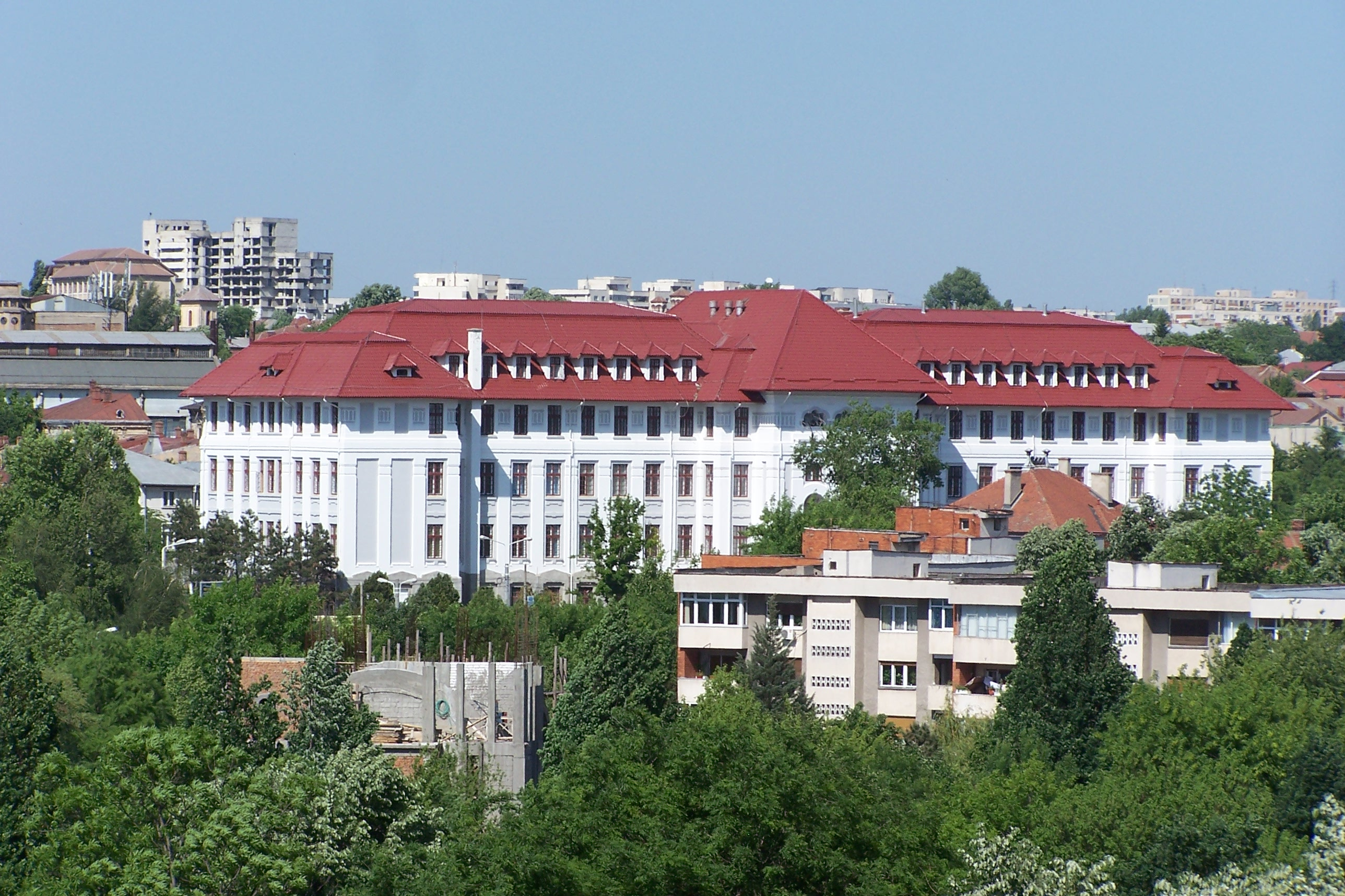
University of Medicine and Pharmacy of Craiova

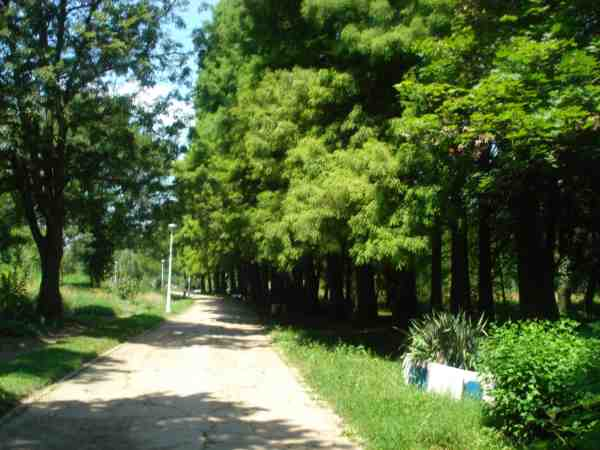
Craiova Botanical Garden

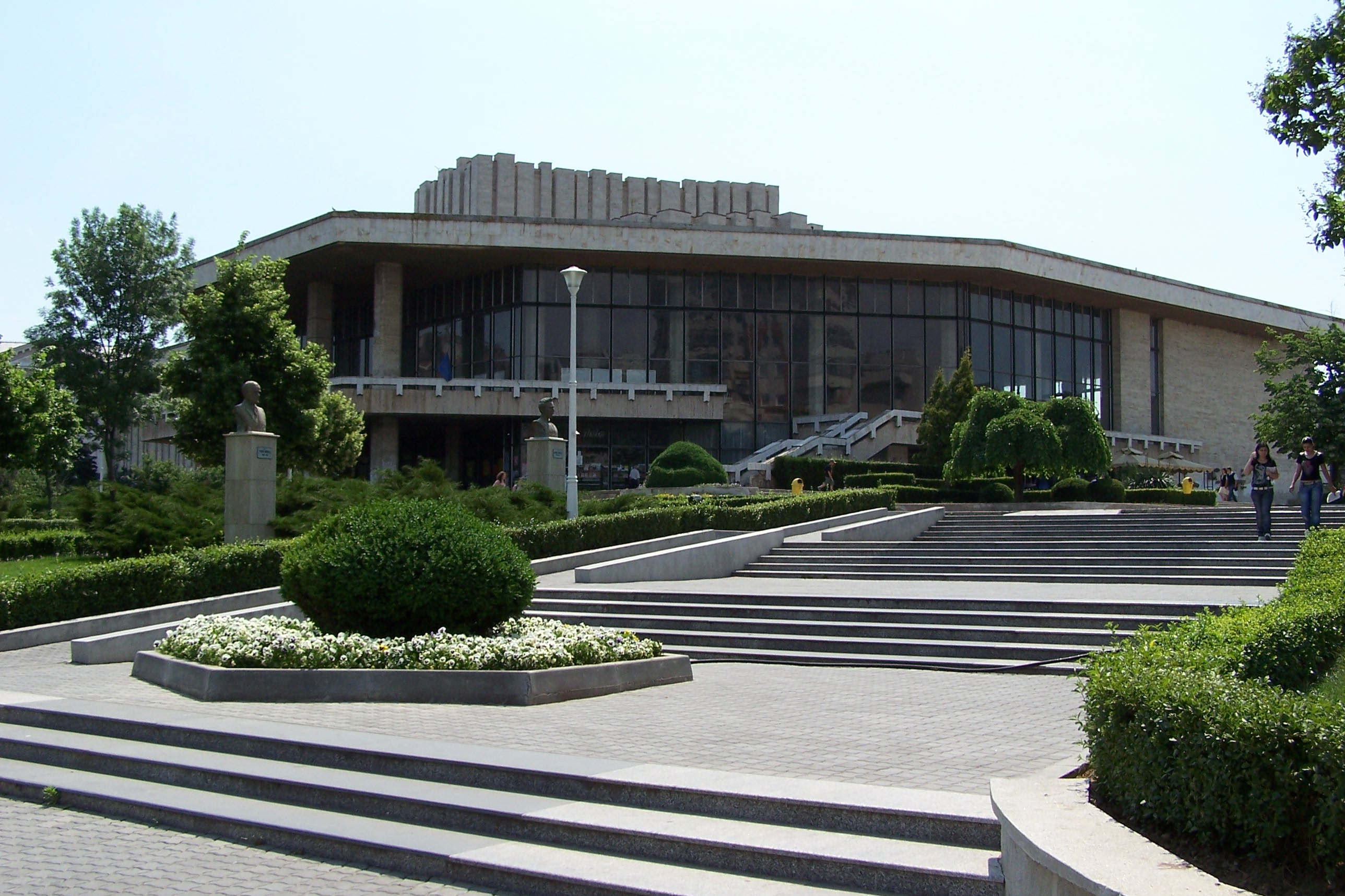
National Theater of Craiova

- Agricultural Complex. The building of the Faculty of Agriculture was built in 1930. It has 7 classrooms, 36 laboratories, 2 workshops (canteen and maintenance), and students hostels (1-5).
- Mechanics Complex. This building includes two faculties, Mechanical Engineering and Chemistry. It has one carpentry workshop, experimental greenhouses, students hostels (6-9), one canteen (no. 2) and one hall (no. 2).
- Electrotechnics Complex. This building includes the Faculty of Electrical Engineering and the Faculty of Automation, Computers and Electronics. The new buildings are the technical and material infrastructures belonging to this complex.
- University Halls and Club. It was the Romanescu House built in the nineteenth century, which was transformed into the University Halls. It has been through reconstruction, decoration and restoration. It is the most representative building in Craiova from the nineteenth century. It was reconstructed and decorated in 1903.
- Central Library. The University Library has over 1 million physical volumes.
- University TV Station. It was founded in 1995 and its TV programs started in January 1996. Its programs is broadcast accord Craiova under the acronym TELE U. It has 15 hours of programs and 9 hours of videotext (university-related information). Its aim is to promote the university activities and faculties. Its news covers the most important events taking place in Oltenia.
- Students House. It was built in 1966. Its initial intention was to house cultural and educative activities, and entertainment performances.
- Alpine Botanical Garden "Marin Paun". The Botanical Garden Rânca is located in Parâng Mountains, at a height of 1550 meters, being the only botanical garden at this height. It has a wide range of European species for the practical research activities of Agriculture students and faculties.
- Craiova Botanical Garden. The Agricultural Institute Botanical Garden was opened in 1952, in order to facilitate the research activities conducted by academic staff of the faculties of agriculture and horticulture. It is also a place of entertainment. The garden is divided into six areas: Plant Systematics, Floral Provinces of the Globe, Cultivated Plants, Seed Beds, Phytogeography of the region of Oltenia, and greenhouses.
- Vila Mircea. This is located in Banu Mărăcine, a suburb of Craiova. It has facilities to accommodate visiting scholars and academic staff.

=== Publications ===
Annals of the University of Craiova:

- Mathematics, Physics and Chemistry Series
- Mathematics and Computer Science Series
- Physics AUC
- Economic Sciences Series
- Electrical Engineering Series
- Automation, Computers, Electronics and Mechatronics Series
- Theology Series
- Medical Sciences Series
- Philology, English Series
- Geographies Series
- ELSE Software
- The Young Economists Journal

=== Sport ===
Universitatea Craiova (University of Craiova Football Club)) was created in 1948. The team name was subsequently changed to CSU Craiova (1950), Stiinta Craiova (1950) and finally Universitatea Craiova in 1966.

== Picture gallery ==
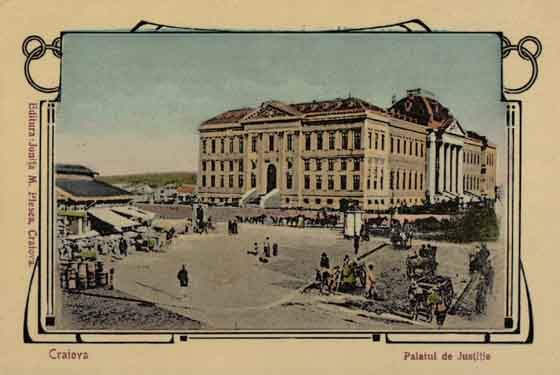
Palace of Justice, 1906

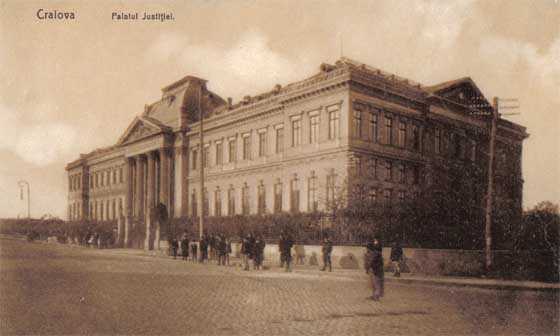
Palace of Justice, 1910

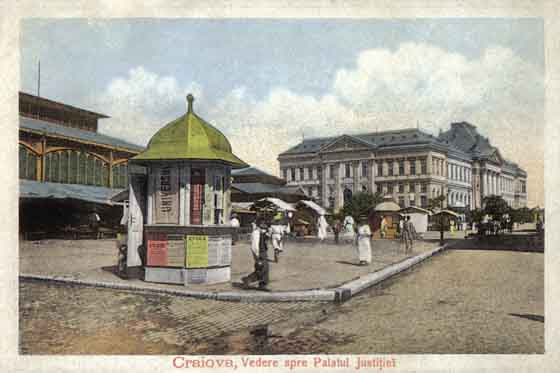
Palace of Justice, 1912

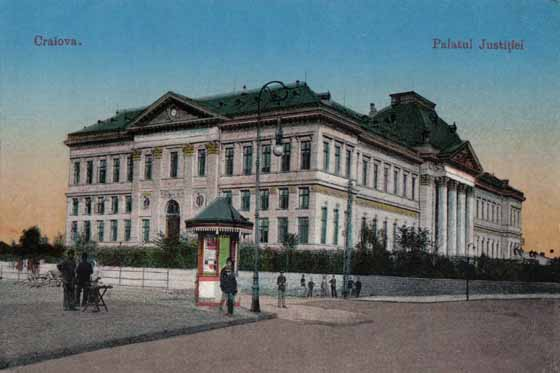
Palace of Justice, 1915

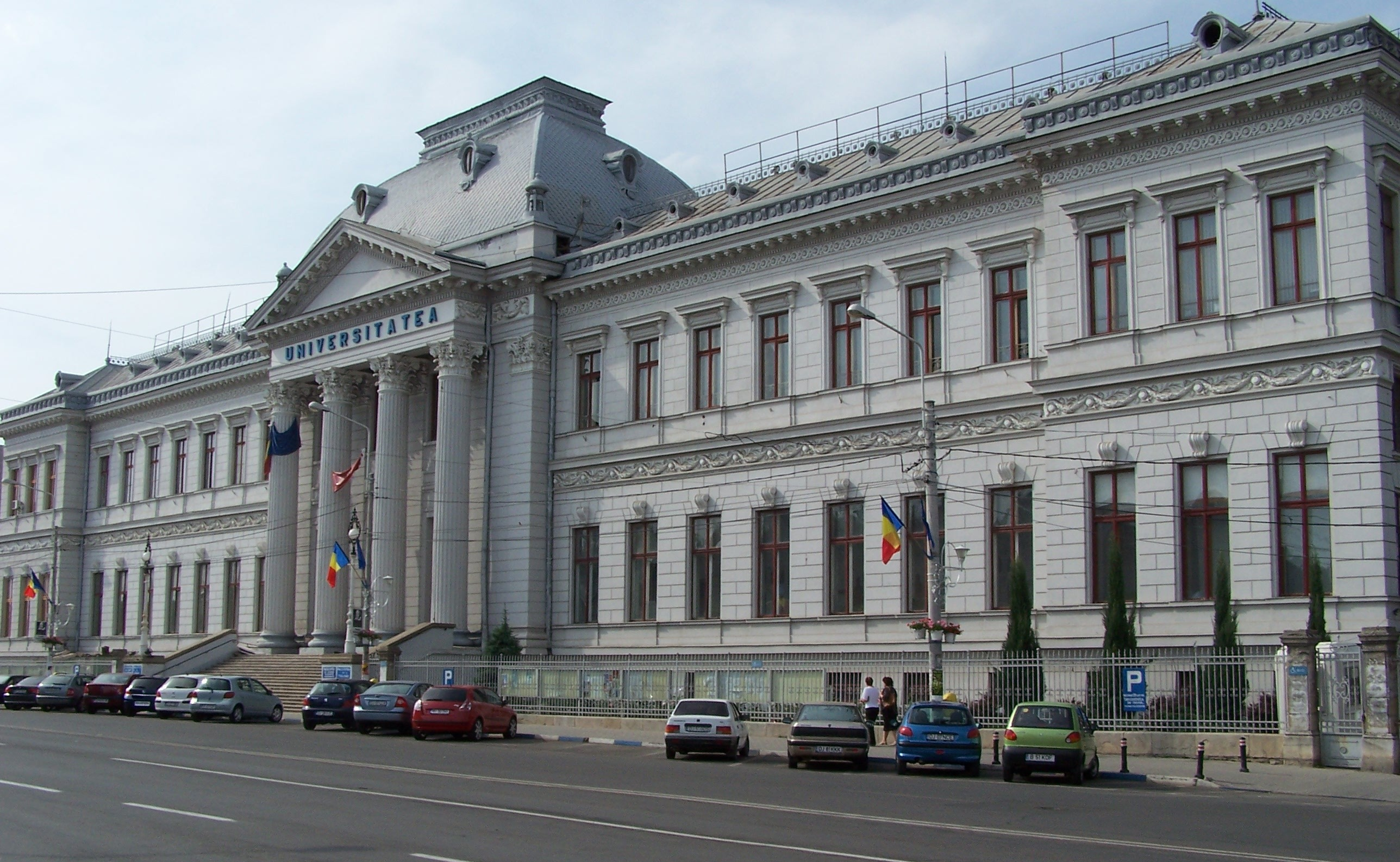
University main building, 2008

== Partner universities ==
The University of Craiova participates in the European educational programs and performs cooperation and student exchanges with other institutions abroad. The university works towards extending collaborations and improving the pedagogical experience of both professors and students. It has signed cooperation agreements with the following international universities:

- Universite Libre de Bruxelles, Belgium
- Katholieke Universiteit Leuven, Belgium
- Pädagogisches Institut des Bundes, Austria
- Bielefeld University, Germany
- Fachhochschule Bochum, Germany
- Hamburger Universität für Wirtschaft und Politik, Germany
- Universidad Autonoma de Madrid, Spain
- Universidad de Sevilla, Spain
- ESIGETEL, France
- Joseph Fourier University (Grenoble I), France
- Paul Valéry University, Montpellier III, France
- Pierre and Marie Curie University (Paris VI), France
- École Supérieure d'Ingénieurs en Électronique et Électrotechnique, France
- Institut National Polytechnique de Grenoble, France
- Paul Sabatier University (Toulouse III), France
- National Polytechnic Institute of Toulouse, France
- University of Burgundy, France
- Aristotle University of Thessaloniki, Greece
- University of L'Aquila, Italy
- University of Perugia, Italy
- Universita degli Studi di Torino, Italy
- University of Groningen, Netherlands
- Universidade Catolica Portuguesa, Portugal
- University of Helsinki, Finland
- Lappeenranta University of Technology, Finland,
- (United Kingdom) University of Luton, UK

== Faculty, alumni and rectors ==
Faculty and alumni of the university include:

- Ana Maria Brânză, a Romanian épée fencer; received a MSc from the University of Craiova in 2007
- Mile Cărpenișan, journalist, war correspondent; studied at the Faculty of Management at the University of Craiova
- Mihai Pătrașcu studied Computer Engineering between 2001–2002 before moving to MIT.
- Ilie Sârbu, Romanian theologian, economist and politician; received a degree in management from the Faculty of Economics at the University of Craiova in 1998
- Nicolae Ungureanu, retired Romanian football defender
- Lia Olguța Vasilescu, Romanian politician; member of the Social Democratic Party (PSD) and mayor of Craiova since June 2012; graduated from the Faculty of Social Sciences at the University of Craiova
- Ayman Odeh, Palestinian-Israeli politician; leader of the Hadash Party

Rectors:

1. Andrei Moraru (1948–1952)
2. Ion Lungu (1952–1955)
3. Alexandru Buia (1955–1964)
4. Marius Preda (1966–1968)
5. Mircea Oprean (1968–1971)
6. Titus Georgescu (1971–1974)
7. Tiberiu Nicola (1974–1981)
8. Silviu Pușcașu (1981–1984)
9. Tiberiu Nicola (1984–1989)
10. Mircea Ivănescu (1990–2004)
11. Ion Vladimirescu (2004–2012)
12. Dan Claudiu Dănișor (2012–2016)
13. Cezar Ionuț Spînu (2016- )
